= Whitaker =

- Pronunciation: English: /ˈwɪtəkə/
- Language: English

Origin
- Language: English
- Origin: Anglo-Saxon
- Derivation: "whit" (white) and "aecer" (cultivated soil)
- Meaning: White cultivated soil
- Region of origin: England

Other names
- Variant forms: Whittaker, Whitacre, Quitacre

Whitaker (also Whittaker) is a surname of English and Scottish origin, meaning the white acre, also spelled "Whittaker" and "Whitacre." Notable people with the surname include:

== People with the name ==
- The Whitaker iron family - a family important in the iron and steel industry in 19th and 20th century America
- A. J. Whitaker (Ayana Jean Whitaker; born 1992), American volleyball player
- Alexander Whitaker (1585–1616), American religious leader
- Amoret Whitaker, forensic entomologist
- Ann Whitaker, American physicist
- Anthony Whitaker (1944–2014), New Zealand herpetologist
- Ayton Whitaker (1916–1999), British producer and director of radio, film and television
- Arthur Luther Whitaker (1921–2007), American minister, professor, psychologist, and sociologist
- Benjamin Whitaker (disambiguation)
- Berry Whitaker (1890–1984), American football college coach
- Bill Whitaker (journalist) (born 1951), American television journalist
- Billy Whitaker (1923–1995), English football defender
- Brandon Whitaker (born 1985), Canadian football running back
- Brian Whitaker, British journalist
- Candi Whitaker (born 1980), American college basketball coach
- Carl Whitaker (1912–1985), American therapist
- Carol Whitaker (born 1982), Canadian curler
- Charles Whitaker (c. 1642 – 1715), English politician
- Chico Whitaker (born 1931), Brazilian social-justice advocate
- Chris Whitaker (born 1974), Australian rugby union player
- Colin Whitaker (1932–2015), English football left winger
- Corinne Whitaker (born 1934), American digital artist
- Cuthbert Whitaker (1873–1950), editor of Whitaker's Almanack
- Danny Whitaker (born 1980), English footballer
- Danta Whitaker (born 1964), American football tight end
- David Whitaker (disambiguation), several people
- Denis Whitaker (1915–2001), Canadian general
- Denzel Whitaker (born 1990), American actor
- Deonce Whitaker (born 1978), Canadian football running back
- Duane Whitaker (born 1959), American actor
- Ed Whitaker (1938–2014), American stock car team owner
- Edward Whitaker (1660–1735), Royal Navy officer
- Edward W. Whitaker (1841–1922), Union Army officer during the American Civil War, Medal of Honor recipient
- Ellen Whitaker (born 1986), English show jumping rider
- Elizabeth Raffald (née Whitaker; 1733–1781), English businesswoman, author of The Experienced English Housekeeper cookery book
- Elsie Whitaker Martinez (1890–1984), daughter of Herman Whitaker
- Eric Whitaker (disambiguation)
- Evelyn Whitaker (1844–1929), children's writer
- Ewen Whitaker (1922–2016), British-American astronomer
- Forest Whitaker (born 1961), American actor
- Francis Whitaker (1906–1999), American blacksmith
- Franklin Whitaker (died 1891), American politician
- Frederic Whitaker (1891–1980), American watercolorist
- Frederick Whitaker (disambiguation)
- George Whitaker (disambiguation), several people
- Harold Whitaker (1920–2013), British animator
- Henry Whitaker (c. 1549 – 1589), English politician, Member of Parliament for Westbury (1586–1588)
- Henry Whitaker (c. 1622 – 1695), English lawyer and politician, Member of Parliament for Shaftesbury (1659, 1661–1679)
- Henry C. Whitaker (born 1978), Florida Solicitor General
- Herman Whitaker (1867–1919), American writer
- Hugh Whitaker (born 1961), British rock drummer
- Jack Whitaker (1924–2019), American sportscaster
- James Whitaker (disambiguation)
- Janet Whitaker, Baroness Whitaker (born 1936), British Labour politician
- Jared Whitaker (1818–1884), mayor of Atlanta, Georgia
- Jason Whitaker (born 1977), American football player
- Jeremiah Whitaker (1599–1654), English Puritan clergyman, member of the Westminster Assembly
- Jim Whitaker (Norris J. Whitaker; born 1950), American politician, Mayor of Fairbanks North Star Borough, Alaska (2003–2009)
- Joel Whitaker (1877–1947), physician and college football player and coach
- John Whitaker (disambiguation), several people
- Joseph Whitaker (disambiguation), several people
- Kati Whitaker, British radio and TV journalist
- Kevin Whitaker (born 1957), American diplomat
- Lance Whitaker (born 1971), heavyweight boxer
- Laurence Whitaker (c. 1578 – 1654), English politician
- Lawrence Whitaker (game designer), American role-playing game designer
- Lang Whitaker, American sportswriter
- Lily C. Whitaker (1850–1932), American educator, writer; daughter of Mary Scrimzeour Whitaker
- Lou Whitaker (born 1957), American baseball player
- Lucian "Skippy" Whitaker (1930–1990), American basketball player
- Lyman Whitaker, American sculptor
- Mabel Whitaker (1884–1976), New Zealand teacher and local historian
- Maria do Céu Whitaker Poças, Céu, Brazilian singer
- Marjorie Whitaker (better known as Malachi Whitaker; 1895–1976)
- Mark Whitaker (disambiguation), several people
- Martin Whitaker, British businessman
- Martin D. Whitaker (1902–1960), American physicist
- Matthew Whitaker (disambiguation)
  - Matthew Whitaker, acting U.S. Attorney General (born 1969)
  - Matthew Whitaker (pianist) (born 2001), American jazz pianist
  - Matthew C. Whitaker, American historian
- Mary Scrimzeour Whitaker (1820–1906), American author; mother of Lily C. Whitaker
- Meade Whitaker (1919–2005), United States Tax Court judge
- Michael Whitaker (born 1960), British equestrian rider,
- Mike Whitaker (swimmer) (born 1951), Canadian Olympic swimmer
- Milton C. Whitaker (1870–1963), American chemist
- Neil Whitaker (1931–2008), Australian rules footballer
- Nelson E. Whitaker (1839–1909), President of the West Virginia Senate 1897–1899
- Nick Whitaker (born 1988), American actor
- Norman T. Whitaker (1890–1975), International Master of chess
- O'Kelley Whitaker (1926–2015), bishop of the Episcopal Diocese of Central New York (1983–1992)
- Ozi William Whitaker (1830–1911), bishop of the Episcopal Church
- Pat Whitaker (1865–1902), Major League Baseball pitcher
- Paul Whitaker (born 1973), English and New Zealand cricketer
- Pernell Whitaker (1964–2019), American boxer
- Peter Whitaker, English actor
- Phil Whitaker (born 1966), British novelist and physician
- Ray Whitaker, Australian rules footballer
- Richard Whitaker (born 1947), Australian meteorologist
- Richard Whitaker (architect), American Third Bay Tradition architect
- Robert Whitaker (disambiguation), several people
- Rod Whitaker (disambiguation)
- Rogers E. M. Whitaker (1900–1981), editor of The New Yorker magazine
- Romulus Whitaker (born 1943), herpetologist
- Ronyell Whitaker (1979–2026), American professional football player
- Rosa Whitaker, American entrepreneur
- Ross T. Whitaker, American engineer
- Ruth Whitaker (1936–2014), American politician
- Samuel Estill Whitaker (1886–1967), Tennessee attorney, mayor of Riverview, Tennessee, and judge of the United States Court of Claims
- Sheila Whitaker (1936–2013), English film programmer and writer
- Slim Whitaker (Charles Orbie Whitaker; 1893–1960), American film actor
- Steve Whitaker (baseball) (born 1943), American baseball player
- Steve Whitaker (1955–2008), British artist
- T. K. Whitaker (1916–2017), Irish economist
- Thomas Bartlett Whitaker (born 1979), American convicted criminal
- Thomas Dunham Whitaker (1759–1821), English clergyman and topographer
- Thomas W. Whitaker (1904–1993), American botanist and horticulturist
- Timothy W. Whitaker (born 1948), Bishop of the United Methodist Church
- Todd Whitaker, American educator, writer, and motivational speaker
- Uncas A. Whitaker (1900–1975), prominent mechanical engineer, electrical engineer, lawyer, entrepreneur, and philanthropist
- Walter C. Whitaker (1823–1887), Union general during the American Civil War
- Wetzel Whitaker (also known as Judge Whitaker; 1908–1985), American Mormon filmmaker
- William Whitaker (disambiguation) (several people)

== Fictional characters ==
- Brad Whitaker, fictional character from the James Bond film The Living Daylights
- Faye Whitaker, fictional character from the webcomic Questionable Content
- John Avery Whitaker, character from the Adventures in Odyssey radio drama
- Dennis Whitaker, fictional character from the American Television show The Pitt
