= Whittaker =

- Pronunciation: English: /ˈwɪtəkə/
- Language: English

Origin
- Language: English
- Origin: Anglo-Saxon
- Derivation: "whit" (white) and "aecer" (cultivated soil)
- Meaning: White cultivated soil
- Region of origin: England

Other names
- Variant forms: Whitaker, Whitacre, Quitacre

Whittaker is a surname of English origin, meaning 'white acre', and a given name. Variants include Whitaker and Whitacre. People with the name include:

== Surname ==
=== A ===
- Aaron Whittaker (born 1968), New Zealand rugby player
- Al Whittaker (1918–2006), American business organizer
- Alison Whittaker, Australian poet
- Allien Whittaker (born 1983), Jamaican footballer
- Andrew Whittaker (engineer) (born 1956), American engineer
- Andy Whittaker, British film distributor
- Anthony Whittaker (born 1968), American composer
- Arnie Whittaker (1879–1955), English footballer

=== B ===
- Ben Whittaker (born 1989), Australian rugby union footballer
- Benjamin Whittaker (born 1997), English boxer
- Bernard Whittaker (1865–??), English footballer
- Bill Whittaker (disambiguation), multiple people
- Bob Whittaker (born 1939), American politician
- Brian Whittaker (disambiguation), multiple people

=== C ===
- Charles Whittaker (disambiguation), multiple people
- Craig Whittaker (born 1962), British politician
- Cynthia Whittaker (1942–2023), American academic

=== D ===
- Dale Whittaker (born 1961), American academic administrator
- David Whittaker (disambiguation), multiple people
- Desmond Whittaker (1925–1966), Indian cricketer
- Dick Whittaker (1934–1998), Irish footballer

=== E ===
- Edgar Whittaker, English footballer
- Edwin Whittaker (1834–1880), English cricketer
- Enos Whittaker (1888–1959), English footballer
- Esmé Whittaker, British art historian
- E. T. Whittaker (1873–1956), English mathematician and historian of science

=== F ===
- Fozzy Whittaker (born 1989), American football player
- Frank Whittaker (1894–1961), Indian bishop
- Fred Whittaker (disambiguation), multiple people

=== G ===
- Gavin Whittaker (1970–2017), Australian rugby league footballer
- Geoff Whittaker (1916–1997), English cricketer
- Geoffrey Owen Whittaker (1932–2015), British civil servant
- George Whittaker (disambiguation), multiple people

=== H ===
- Harvey Whittaker (1875–1937), English footballer
- Huey Whittaker (born 1981), American football player

=== I ===
- Ian Whittaker (1928–2022), British set designer
- Ike Whittaker (born 1935), Australian footballer

=== J ===
- Jace Whittaker (born 1995), American football player
- Jack Whittaker (disambiguation), multiple people
- James Whittaker (disambiguation), multiple people
- Jason Whittaker (disambiguation), multiple people
- Jeff Whittaker (born 1940), New Zealand politician
- Jim Whittaker (1929–2026), American climber and mountain guide
- Jodie Whittaker (born 1982), English actress
- John Macnaghten Whittaker (1905-1984), British mathematician, son of Edmund Taylor Whittaker
- John Whittaker (disambiguation), multiple people
- Johnson Chesnut Whittaker (1858–1931), American military student
- Joseph Whittaker (1813–1894), English botanist

=== K ===
- Kai Whittaker (born 1985), German politician

=== L ===
- Leon Whittaker (born 1985), Caymanian footballer
- Lou Whittaker (1929–2024), American mountaineer

=== M ===
- Maria Whittaker (born 1968), English glamour model
- Mark Whittaker (born 1965), Australian journalist
- Meredith Whittaker, American researcher
- Michael Whittaker (disambiguation), multiple people
- Morgan Whittaker (born 2001), English footballer

=== N ===
- Neil Whittaker (born 1956), Australian rugby union footballer
- Nicholas Whittaker (born 1953), British writer
- Noel Whittaker (born 1940), Australian columnist

=== P ===
- Paul Whittaker (born 1957), Australian cricketer
- Paul Whittaker (newspaper editor), Australian newspaper editor
- Patricia Whittaker, West Indian cricketer

=== R ===
- Ray Whittaker (born 1945), English footballer
- Rebecca Whittaker, Canadian politician
- Red Whittaker (born 1948), American robot scientist
- Robert Whittaker (disambiguation), multiple people
- Roger Whittaker (1936–2023), Kenyan-British singer-songwriter
- Ron Whittaker (born 1971), American golfer

=== S ===
- Sally Whittaker (born 1963), British soap opera actress
- Sammy Whittaker (1888–1952), English footballer
- Sandra Whittaker (born 1963), British sprinter
- Sheelagh Whittaker (born 1947), Canadian business executive
- Spen Whittaker (1871–1910), English football manager
- Stanley Whittaker (born 1994), American basketball player
- Stephen Whittaker (1947–2003), British actor and director
- Steve Whittaker, American professor
- Steven Whittaker (born 1984), Scottish footballer
- Stuart Whittaker (born 1975) English football player

=== T ===
- Thomas Whittaker (disambiguation), multiple people
- Tony Whittaker (1932–2016), British politician
- Trevor Whittaker (born 1942), English professor

=== V ===
- Victor P. Whittaker (1919–2016), British biochemist

=== W ===
- Walt Whittaker (1894–1965), American baseball player
- Walter Whittaker (1878–1917), English footballer
- William Whittaker (disambiguation), multiple people

== Given name ==
- Whittaker Chambers (1901–1961), American writer, witness in Alger Hiss espionage case
