= Mutiny =

Disobeying of superiors

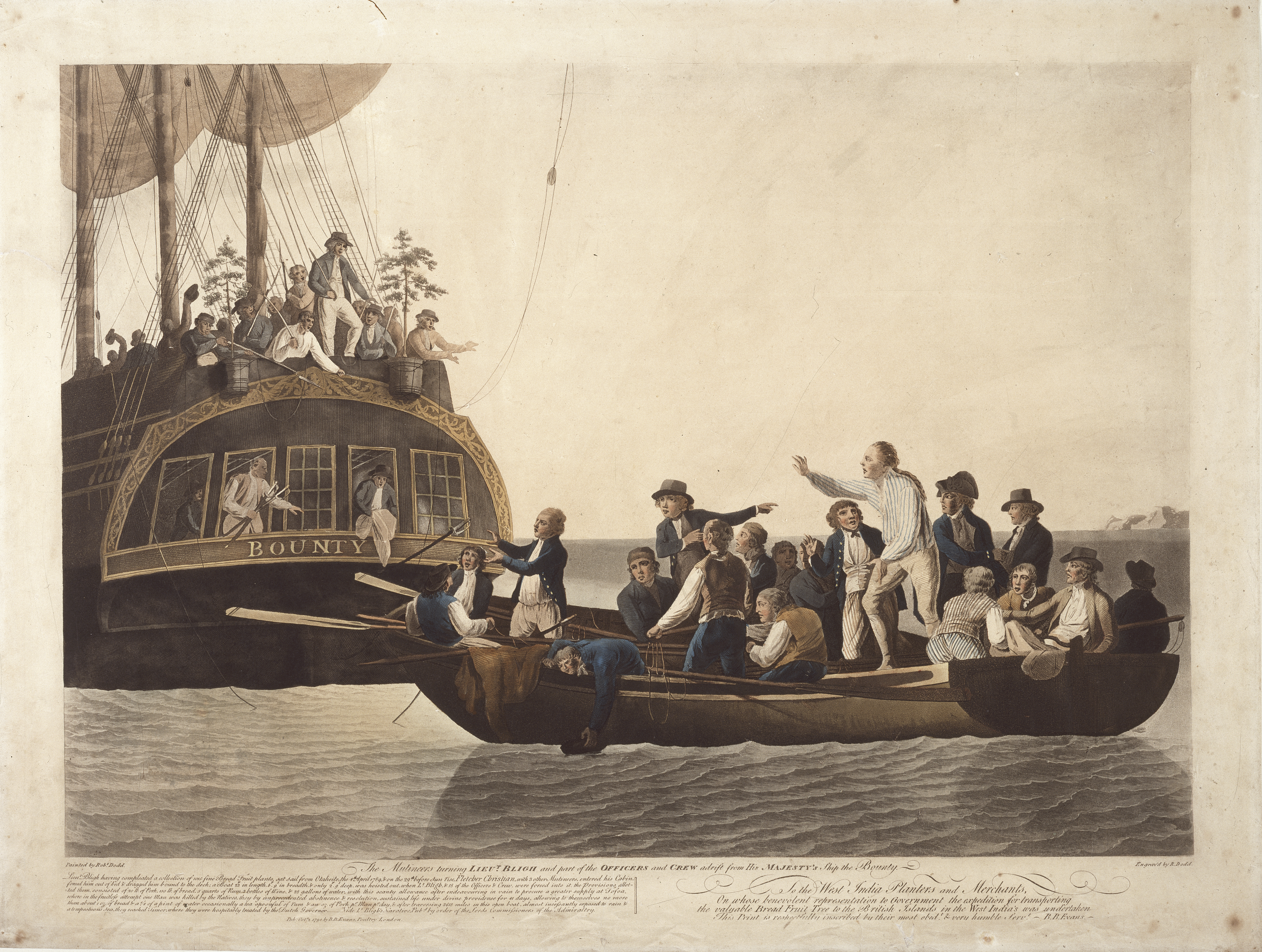
An illustration of the mutiny on the Bounty

Mutiny is a revolt among a group of people (typically of a military or a crew) to oppose, change, or remove their superiors or orders. The term is commonly used for insubordination by members of the military against an officer or superior, but it can also sometimes mean any type of rebellion against any force. Mutiny does not necessarily need to refer to a military force and can describe a political, economic, or power structure in which subordinates defy superiors.

During the Age of Discovery, mutiny particularly meant open rebellion against a ship's captain. This occurred, for example, during Ferdinand Magellan's journeys around the world, resulting in the killing of one mutineer, the execution of another, and the marooning of others; on Henry Hudson's Discovery, resulting in Hudson and others being set adrift in a boat; and the famous mutiny on the Bounty.

Mutiny is widely considered a serious crime, punishable by imprisonment, penal labour or death. Failure to prevent or suppress a mutiny may also be punishable depending on the circumstances; negligent failure may result in dishonourable discharge while wilful failure may bring any punishment including death. The United Kingdom has passed various Mutiny Acts to establish procedure and punishment, the latest of which is the Armed Forces Act 2006. Military mutineers are usually tried at court martial, represented by counsel. Pirate captains have been known to mete out punishment ad hoc without due process.

== Penalty ==
Those convicted of mutiny have often faced capital punishment.

=== United Kingdom ===
Until 1689, mutiny was regulated in England by Articles of War instituted by the monarch and effective only in a period of war. In 1689, the first Mutiny Act was approved, which passed the responsibility to enforce discipline within the military to Parliament. The Mutiny Act, altered in 1803, and the Articles of War defined the nature and punishment of mutiny until the latter were replaced by the Army Discipline and Regulation Act in 1879. This, in turn, was replaced by the Army Act in 1881.

Today the Armed Forces Act 2006 defines mutiny as follows:

(2) For the purposes of this section a person subject to service law takes part in a mutiny if—

(a) in concert with at least one other person subject to service law, he—

(i) acts with the intention of overthrowing or resisting authority; or

(ii) disobeys authority in such circumstances as to subvert discipline;

(b) he agrees with at least one other person subject to service law to overthrow or resist authority; or

(c) he agrees with at least one other person subject to service law to disobey authority, and the agreed disobedience would be such as to subvert discipline.

The same definition applies in the Royal Navy and Royal Air Force.

The military law of England in early times existed, like the forces to which it applied, in a period of war only. Troops were raised for a particular service and were disbanded upon the cessation of hostilities. The crown, by prerogative, made laws known as Articles of War for the government and discipline of the troops while thus embodied and serving. Except for the punishment of desertion, which was made a felony by statute in the reign of Henry VI, these ordinances or Articles of War remained almost the sole authority for enforcing discipline until 1689. That year, the first Mutiny Act was passed and the military forces of the crown were brought under the direct control of Parliament. Even the Parliamentary forces in the time of Charles I and Oliver Cromwell were governed not by an act of the legislature, but by articles of war similar to those issued by the king and authorized by an ordinance of the Lords and Commons exercising in that respect the sovereign prerogative. This power of law-making by prerogative was however held to be applicable during a state of actual war only, and attempts to exercise it in times of peace were ineffectual. Subject to this limitation, it existed for considerably more than a century after the passing of the first Mutiny Act.

From 1689 to 1803, the Mutiny Act occasionally expired during times of peace. Yet statutory power was given to the crown to make Articles of War that operated in the colonies and elsewhere beyond the seas in the same manner as those made by prerogative in times of war.

In 1715, in consequence of the rebellion, this power was created in respect of the forces in the kingdom, but apart from and in no respect affected the principle acknowledged all this time that the crown of its mere prerogative could make laws for the government of the army in foreign countries in time of war.

The Mutiny Act 1803 effected a great constitutional change in this respect: the power of the Crown to make any Articles of War became altogether statutory, and the prerogative merged in the act of Parliament. The Mutiny Act 1873 was passed in this manner.

Such matters remained until 1879 when the last Mutiny Act was passed and the last Articles of War were promulgated. The Mutiny Act legislated for offences in respect of which death or penal servitude could be awarded. Meanwhile, the Articles of War, while repeating those provisions of the act, constituted the direct authority for dealing with offences for which imprisonment was the maximum punishment, as well as with many matters relating to trial and procedure.

The act and the articles were found not to harmonize in all respects. Their general arrangement was faulty, and their language sometimes obscure. In 1869, a royal commission recommended that both should be recast in a simple and intelligible shape. In 1878, a committee of the House of Commons endorsed this view and made recommendations for performing the task. In 1879, a measure was passed into law consolidating in one act both the Mutiny Act and the Articles of War, and amending their provisions in certain important respects. This measure was called the Army Discipline and Regulation Act 1879.

After one or two years of experience highlighted the need for improvement, it was superseded by the Army Act 1881, which formed the foundation and main portion of the military law of England. The act contained a proviso saving the right of the crown to make Articles of War, but in such a manner as to render the power in effect a nullity by enacting that no crime made punishable by the act shall be otherwise punishable by such articles. As the punishment of every conceivable offence was provided, any articles made under the act could be no more than an empty formality having no practical effect.

Thus the history of English military law up to 1879 may be divided into three periods, each having a distinct constitutional aspect: (I) prior to 1689, the army, being regarded as so many personal retainers of the sovereign rather than servants of the state, was mainly governed by the will of the sovereign; (2) between 1689 and 1803, the army, being recognised as a permanent force, was governed within the realm by statute and without it by the prerogative of the crown; and (3) from 1803 to 1879, it was governed either directly by statute or by the sovereign under an authority derived from and defined and limited by statute. Although in 1879 the power of making Articles of War became in effect inoperative, the sovereign was empowered to make rules of procedure, having the force of law, to regulate the administration of the act in many matters formerly dealt with by the Articles of War. These rules, however, must not be inconsistent with the provisions of the Army Act itself, and must be laid before parliament immediately after they are made. Thus in 1879, the government and discipline of the army became for the first time completely subject either to the direct action or the close supervision of Parliament.

A further notable change took place at the same time. The Mutiny Act had been brought into force on each occasion for one year only, in compliance with the constitutional theory:

that the maintenance of a standing army in time of peace, unless with the consent of parliament, is against law. Each session therefore the text of the act had to be passed through both Houses clause by clause and line by line. The Army Act, on the other hand, is a fixed permanent code. But constitutional traditions are fully respected by the insertion in it of a section providing that it shall come into force only by virtue of an annual act of parliament. This annual act recites the illegality of a standing army in time of peace unless with the consent of parliament, and the necessity nevertheless of maintaining a certain number of land forces (exclusive of those serving in India) and a body of royal marine forces on shore, and of keeping them in exact discipline, and it brings into force the Army Act for one year.

==== Sentence ====
Until 1998, mutiny and another offence of failing to suppress or report a mutiny were each punishable with death. Section 21(5) of the Human Rights Act 1998 completely abolished the death penalty in the United Kingdom. (Prior to this, the death penalty had already been abolished for murder, but it had remained in force for certain military offences and treason, although no executions had been carried out for several decades.) This provision was not required by the European Convention on Human Rights, since Protocol 6 of the Convention permitted the death penalty in time of war, and Protocol 13, which prohibits the death penalty for all circumstances, did not then exist. The government introduced section 21(5) as a late amendment in response to parliamentary pressure.

=== United States ===
The United States' Uniform Code of Military Justice defines mutiny in section 894 of title 10 (Article 94 of the Uniform Code of Military Justice) as follows:

§894. Art. 94. Mutiny or sedition

(a) Any person subject to this chapter who-

(1) with intent to usurp or override lawful military authority, refuses, in concert with any other person, to obey orders or otherwise do his duty or creates any violence or disturbance is guilty of mutiny;
(2) with intent to cause the overthrow or destruction of lawful civil authority, creates, in concert with any other person, revolt, violence, or other disturbance against that authority is guilty of sedition;
(3) fails to do his utmost to prevent and suppress a mutiny or sedition being committed in his presence, or fails to take all reasonable means to inform his superior commissioned officer or commanding officer of a mutiny or sedition which he knows or has reason to believe is taking place, is guilty of a failure to suppress or report a mutiny or sedition.

(b) A person who is found guilty of attempted mutiny, mutiny, sedition, or failure to suppress or report a mutiny or sedition shall be punished by death or such other punishment as a court-martial may direct.

U.S. military law requires obedience only to lawful orders. Disobedience to unlawful orders (see superior orders) is the obligation of every member of the U.S. military, a principle established by the Nuremberg and Tokyo Trials following World War II and reaffirmed in the aftermath of the My Lai Massacre during the Vietnam War. However, a U.S. soldier who disobeys an order after deeming it unlawful will almost certainly be court-martialed to determine whether the disobedience was proper. In addition, simple refusal to obey is not mutiny, which requires collaboration or conspiracy to disobedience.

== Famous mutinies in history ==
=== 16th century ===
- Sack of Antwerp, one of the many mutinies in the Spanish Army of Flanders during the Eighty Years' War; this mutiny caused the provinces of the Habsburg Netherlands to temporarily unite in rebellion against Philip II of Spain and sign the Pacification of Ghent.
- Sack of Rome (1527), military event carried out by the mutinous troops of Charles V, Holy Roman Emperor.

=== 17th century ===
- Discovery mutiny in 1611 during the 4th voyage of Henry Hudson, after having been trapped in pack ice over the winter, his desire to continue incited the crew to casting him and 8 others adrift.
- Batavia was a ship of the Dutch East India Company (VOC), built in 1628 in Amsterdam, which suffered both mutiny and shipwreck during her maiden voyage.
- Second English Civil War
  - Corkbush Field mutiny (1647)
  - Banbury mutiny (1649)
  - Bishopsgate mutiny (1649)

=== 18th century ===
- The Wager Mutiny – the main body of the crew of the British war ship HMS Wager mutinied against their Captain after she was wrecked on a desolate island off the south coast of Chile in 1741. The ship was part of a squadron bound to attack Spanish interests in the Pacific.
- A failed 1787 mutiny aboard Middlesex occurred two weeks before HMS Bounty's final departure from England, which included the lead mutineer of HMS Bounty Fletcher Christian's older brother Charles.
- Mutiny aboard HMS Bounty, a mutiny aboard a British Royal Navy ship in 1789 that has been made famous by several books and films.
- Quibéron mutinies were major mutinies in the French fleet in 1793.
- HMS Hermione was a 32-gun fifth-rate frigate of the British Royal Navy. While operating in the Caribbean in 1797 a portion of the crew mutinied, killing the captain, eight other officers, two midshipmen and a clerk before surrendering the ship to the Spanish authorities. The mutiny was the bloodiest recorded in the history of the Royal Navy.
- Spithead and Nore mutinies were two major mutinies by sailors of the British Royal Navy in 1797.
- Schemes for mutiny onboard nine British warships between June and mid-August 1798, resulting in courts-martial for crew from HMS Adamant, HMS Atlas, HMS Caesar, HMS Defiance, HMS Glory, HMS Haughty, HMS Neptune, HMS Queen Charlotte and HMS St George
- The Vlieter Incident was a mutiny of a squadron of the fleet of the Batavian Republic which caused it to be surrendered to the British without a fight in 1799 at the start of the Anglo-Russian invasion of Holland.

=== 19th century ===
- HMS Dominica – in May 1806, crew members mutinied, took over the ship and turned her over to the French. She was later recaptured by the British and the mutiny's ringleader hanged.
- Vellore Mutiny, outbreak against the British East India Company on 10 July 1806, by sepoys forming part of the garrison of a fortress and palace complex at Vellore (now in Tamil Nadu state, southern India).
- The Froberg mutiny by the Froberg Regiment in Fort Ricasoli, Malta in 1807. The mutiny was suppressed and 30 men were executed.
- The US whaler Globe mutiny of 1824. Captain and several crewmen were brutally murdered by whaler Samuel Comstock of Nantucket. Comstock was then murdered on Mili, a remote but inhabited Pacific island that he intended to take over and make his own, by the ship's remaining survivors.
- Barrackpore Mutiny, (2 November 1824), incident during the First Anglo-Burmese War (1824–26), generally regarded as a dress rehearsal for the Indian Mutiny of 1857 because of its similar combination of Indian grievances against the British.
- St. Joseph Mutiny (1837): rebellion, led by Daaga, of forcibly conscripted African soldiers in the 1st West India Regiment in British Trinidad.
- La Amistad, in 1839. A group of captured African slaves being transported in Cuba mutinied against the crew, killing the captain.
- The brig USS Somers had a mutiny plotted onboard on her first voyage in 1842. Three men were accused of conspiring to commit mutiny, and were hanged.
- Lady Franklin (1854) seized by convicts
- The Indian rebellion of 1857 was a period of armed uprising in India against British colonial power, and was popularly remembered in Britain as the Indian Mutiny or Sepoy Mutiny. It is remembered in India as the First War of Independence.
- Sharon, a Fairhaven whaleship, was subject to multiple mass desertions, mutinies and the murder and dismemberment of a cruel (and from the record, sociopathic) captain by four Polynesians who had been pressed into service on Sharon.
- In 1857 on the whaleship Junior, Cyrus Plummer and several accomplices engineered a mutiny that resulted in the murder of Captain Archibald Mellen and Third Mate John Smith. The mutineers were captured and found guilty in the fall of 1858. Plummer was sentenced to be hanged and his accomplices received life sentences. The story made national and international news and Plummer was able to garner a stay of execution from President James Buchanan and was ultimately pardoned by Ulysses S. Grant.
- The Cavite Mutiny of 1872 in the Philippines.
- The Brazilian Naval Revolt was the occasion of two mutinies in 1893 and 1894.

=== 20th century ===
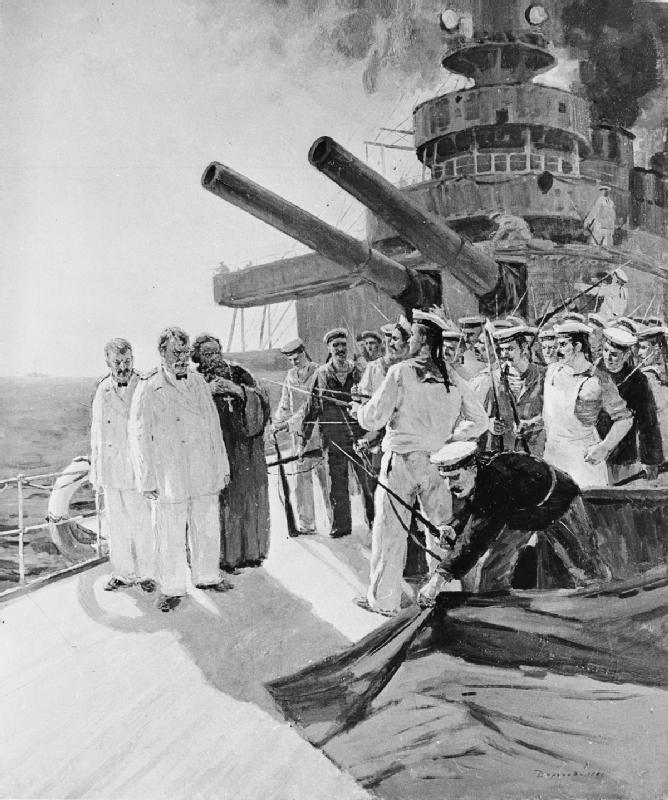
Artistic impression of the mutiny by the crew of the battleship Potemkin against the ship's officers on 14 June 1905.

- Mutiny aboard the Russian battleship Potemkin, a rebellion of the crew against their officers in June 1905 during the Russian Revolution of 1905. It was made famous by the film Battleship Potemkin.
- The Revolta da Chibata ("Revolt of the Lash") was a Brazilian naval mutiny of 1910, where Afro-Brazilian crewmen rose up against oppressive white officers who frequently beat them. Their goal was to have their living conditions improved and the chibata (whips or lashes) banned from the navy.
- Guaymas Mutiny On 22 February 1914, Mexican Navy sailors under Lieutenant Hilario Rodríguez Malpica seized control of gunboat Tampico off Guaymas, Mexico. This event led to a naval campaign off Topolobampo during the Mexican Revolution.
- Curragh Incident, also known as the Curragh Mutiny of 20 July 1914 occurred in the Curragh, Ireland, where British officers threatened to resign rather than enforce the Home Rule Act 1914.
- Etaples Mutiny by British troops, 1917
- French Army mutinies in 1917. The failure of the Nivelle Offensive in April and May 1917 resulted in widespread mutiny in many units of the French Army.
- Wilhelmshaven mutiny broke out in the German High Seas Fleet on 29 October 1918. The mutiny led directly to the Kiel mutiny a few days later.
- Kiel mutiny: Major revolt by sailors on 3 November 1918 in response to arrests of suspected Wilhelmshaven ringleaders. It sparked the German Revolution of 1918-1919, which led to the collapse of the monarchy and the establishment of the Weimar Republic.
- Luxembourg Rebellions: After two failed communist revolutions in November and after a minor mutiny in December, the Luxembourg Army took over the Chamber of Deputies, and proclaimed a republic.
- Black Sea mutiny by crews aboard the French dreadnoughts Jean Bart and France, sent to assist the White Russians in the Russian Civil War. The ringleaders (including André Marty and Charles Tillon) received long prison sentences.
- The 1920 mutiny of the mainly Irish unit of Connaught Rangers in the British Army against martial law being imposed and brutally enforced by the Black and Tans in Ireland during the Irish War of Independence. The leader, Private James Daly, became the last member of the British Armed Forces to be executed for mutiny when he was shot by firing squad on 2 November 1920.
- Kronstadt rebellion, an unsuccessful uprising of Russian sailors, led by Stepan Petrichenko, against the government of the early Russian SFSR in the first weeks of March in 1921. It proved to be the last large rebellion against Bolshevik rule.
- Irish Army Mutiny, a crisis in March 1924 provoked by a proposed reduction in army numbers in the immediate post-Civil War period.
- Invergordon Mutiny, an industrial action by around a thousand sailors in the British Atlantic Fleet, that took place on 15–16 September 1931. For two days, ships of the Royal Navy at Invergordon were in open mutiny, in one of the few military strikes in British history.
- Mutiny aboard the Dutch warship the De Zeven Provinciën as a result of salary cuts in early February 1933.
- 1936 Naval Revolt in Portugal, also known as the Mutiny on the Tagus ships. Sailors aboard two Portuguese ships imprisoned their officers and attempted to sail out into the open sea. Coastal artillery disabled both ships and the Estado Novo shortly thereafter founded the Legião Portuguesa.
- Cocos Islands Mutiny, a failed mutiny by Sri Lankan servicemen on the then-British Cocos (Keeling) Islands during the Second World War.
- Battle of Bamber Bridge on 24–25 June 1943, a racially motivated mutiny by African American soldiers in a segregated U.S. Army truck unit stationed in Bamber Bridge, Lancashire, United Kingdom.
- Townsville mutiny on 22 May 1942, a mutiny by about 600 African American servicemen of the 96th Engineer Battalion of the United States Army while serving in Townsville, Australia, during World War II. See also African-American mutinies in the United States armed forces.
- Port Chicago mutiny on August 9, 1944, three weeks after the Port Chicago disaster. 258 out of the 320 African-American sailors in the ordnance battalion refused to load any ammunition.
- Terrace mutiny, a mutiny by French-Canadian soldiers in Terrace, British Columbia, in November 1944.

==== After World War II ====
- Post–World War II demobilization strikes occurred within Allied military forces stationed across the Middle East, India and Southeast Asia in the months and years following the Second World War.
- The Royal Indian Navy Mutiny encompasses a total strike and subsequent mutiny by the Indian sailors of the Royal Indian Navy on board ship and shore establishments at Bombay Harbour on 18 February 1946.
- SS Columbia Eagle incident occurred on 14 March 1970 during the Vietnam War when sailors aboard the American merchant ship Columbia Eagle mutinied and hijacked the ship to Cambodia.
- The East Bengal Regiment switched sides from the Pakistan Army to the Bangladesh Forces during the Bangladesh Liberation War.
- The Unit 684 mutiny occurred in 23 August 1971 when members of Republic of Korea Air Force black ops Unit 684 mutinied for unclear reasons.
- The Storozhevoy mutiny occurred on 9 November 1975 in Riga, Latvian SSR, Soviet Union. The political officer locked up the Soviet Navy captain and sailed the ship toward Leningrad.
- The Velos mutiny: On 23 May 1973, the captain of Velos destroyer refused to return to Greece after a NATO exercise to protest against the dictatorship in Greece.
- 1977 Bangladesh Air Force Mutiny, during which 11 officers of the Bangladesh Air Force were killed by mutineers.
- The Coup d'état of December Twelfth in 1979, where a secret society of military officers in South Korea led by Major General Chun Doo-hwan mutinied against the Chief of Staff of the Republic of Korea Army General Jeong Seung-hwa.
- Following Operation Blue Star against Sikh militants holed in the Golden Temple in the Sikh holy city of Amritsar, many soldiers and officers of Indian Army's Sikh Regiment mutinied or resigned.

=== 21st century ===
- 2003 Oakwood mutiny – A group of 321 officers and personnel of the Philippines Armed Forces took over the Oakwood Premier Ayala Center serviced apartment tower in Makati to show the Filipino people the alleged corruption of President Gloria Macapagal Arroyo.
- 2003 Fort Bonifacio Crisis – Members of the Philippine Marines staged a protest over the removal of their Commandant Maj. Gen. Renato Miranda.
- 2009 Bangladesh Rifles revolt – A group of Bangladesh border guards revolted, demanding equal rights to the regular army and killed several of their officers.
- 2011 Mutiny on Lurongyu 2682, a Chinese fishing trawler in the South Pacific. After a month of killings, 11 of the 33 crew returned to China.
- 2013 Eritrean Army mutiny on 21 January 2013, when around 100 to 200 soldiers of the Eritrean Army seized the headquarters of the state broadcaster, EriTV, to resist the rule of President Isaias Afwerki.
- 2013 1st Battalion Yorkshire Regiment, British Army – Sixteen soldiers were jailed after a court martial for staging a 'sit-in' protest against their Captain and Colour Sergeant
- 2014 Nigerian Army: A total of 54 soldiers were sentenced to death by firing squad by a court martial in two separate trials, after they had refused to fight to recapture a town that had been captured by Boko Haram insurgents. The sentences are subject to the approval of senior officers.
- 2020 Malian mutiny, where elements of the Malian Armed Forces mutinied before developing into a coup which overthrew the civilian government of President Ibrahim Keïta.
- 2022 Russian Ground Forces: Obozrevatel reported that around 5,000 contract soldiers in the city of Belgorod rioted after being told that they would be sent to fight in Ukraine. Russian soldiers had also been surrendering en masse, and many had reportedly sabotaged their own vehicles, with prime examples being instances of gas tank sabotage among soldiers in the Russian Kyiv convoy.
- 2022 Russian Naval Infantry: Russian conscripts rioted aboard Russian naval ships which were going to land in Odessa as part of the Russian invasion of Ukraine. As a result of the riot, the landing was called off.
- 2022 Russian Ground Forces: Russian soldiers of the 37th Motor Rifle Brigade purposefully ran over their commanding officer, Colonel Yuri Medvedev, killing or severely injuring him. This was reportedly because the 37th Brigade had lost close to half of their men during the Battle of Makariv under the leadership of Medvedev.
- 2023 Wagner Group mutiny, where the Russian private military company Wagner Group mutinied against the Russian Ministry of Defense for intentionally concealing the true number of soldiers killed in the war in Ukraine and allegedly attempting to deceive the public and President Vladimir Putin by portraying Ukraine as an aggressive and hostile adversary which, in collaboration with NATO, was plotting an attack on Russian interests.
- 2024 Voznesensk mutiny: On 4 October 2024, Ukrainian soldiers of the 187th Battalion of the 123rd Territorial Defense Brigade refused orders to perform a combat mission and went AWOL. The soldiers then held a rally in Voznesensk where they attempted to draw attention to the lack of training and weapons to participate in combat operations in the Donetsk sector.

== See also ==
- Coup d'état
- Fragging
- Insubordination
- List of revolutions and rebellions
