= 1942 Phoenix Thanksgiving Day riot =

1942 riot in Phoenix, United States

- Date: November 26, 1942; 11 p.m.
- Location: Phoenix, Arizona, United States; 33°26′50″N 112°2′52″W
- Caused by: Conflict between infantrymen and military police officers

Parties
364th Infantry Regiment	733rd Military Battalion; Phoenix Police Department

Casualties
- Deaths: 3
- Injuries: 12
- Arrested: At least 150
- Charged: 15

On November 26, 1942, a riot occurred in Phoenix, Arizona, United States, involving United States Army infantrymen, military police, and members of the Phoenix Police Department. The incident left three people dead and approximately a dozen injured.

At the time, Phoenix was experiencing an influx of soldiers as a result of World War II. One unit, the 364th Infantry Regiment, was stationed in the city in June 1942. This unit was composed entirely of African Americans, with the infantrymen experiencing racial discrimination. Such racial segregation was commonplace in Phoenix at the time.

On November 26, in celebration of Thanksgiving, infantrymen were allowed to leave their military base. At about 11 p.m. that night, military police (MP) attempted to arrest an infantryman who had become involved in a physical altercation with a woman at a venue in Downtown Phoenix. During the course of the arrest, MPs fired multiple shots, injuring at least one bystander. In the aftermath, some infantrymen returned to their base, told an exaggerated account of the event, and returned with weapons, prompting a firefight between MPs, infantrymen, and, later, local law enforcement officials. Police cordoned off 28 blocks in Phoenix's African-American neighborhood and went door to door looking for men who had been involved in the firefight, shooting into houses where they believed they were hiding. The riot had largely died down by the next morning, leaving three dead and multiple wounded.

In the aftermath, over 100 members of the regiment were arrested, with 15 receiving courts-martial. One was given a death sentence, though this was later commuted. Several days after the riot, and possibly due in part to the riot, the military declared Phoenix off-limits for military personnel, prompting a reform movement from local business leaders. The 364th was later relocated from Phoenix to Mississippi and, later, Alaska. Concerning historians' views on the riot, Ray Stern of the Phoenix New Times stated in 2020 that, while it differs in some respects from the "race riot[s]" that occurred during the same time period, racial tensions nonetheless were "at the root of the problem".

== Background ==
=== Phoenix during World War II ===
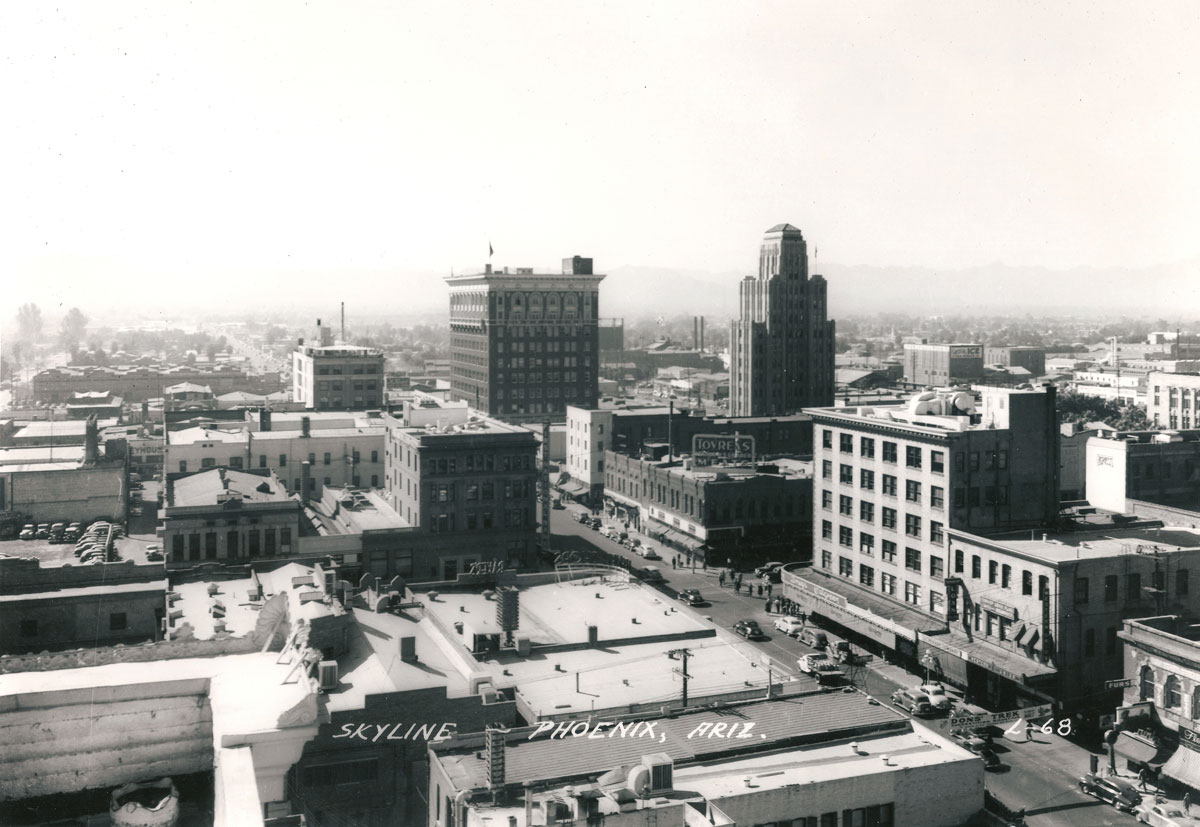
Downtown Phoenix, c. 1940

In 1942, the African American population of Phoenix, Arizona, was roughly 4,200, constituting about 5 percent of the city's total population. Due to the city's enforcement of a strict system of racial segregation, members of this community were largely unable to participate in many aspects of society. Residential segregation meant that much of the community lived in an area east of Downtown Phoenix around Eastlake Park. Many experienced poor living conditions and faced an openly hostile political and social scene, as evidenced by the fact that several of the city's leaders, including at least one mayor, had been members of the Ku Klux Klan in the 1920s.

During World War II, Phoenix became a hub of military activity, with many soldiers stationed in the area. The presence of these military members led to an economic boom for the city, and the economic demands of the war led to a greater intermingling of people from different ethnic and racial backgrounds. Concerning the changes occurring in Phoenix at the time, Paul Hietter, a history professor at Mesa Community College, said in 2020, "For the first time, you've got a huge intermingling of races you didn't have before."

=== The 364th Infantry Regiment ===
In June 1942, the 364th Infantry Regiment, (Note: Multiple sources refer to the unit during its time in Phoenix as the 364th Infantry Regiment, with a 2020 article for the Phoenix New Times by reporter Ray Stern stating that the regiment had been created prior to their assignment in Phoenix and could trace its history to the 367th Infantry Regiment, which had been formed in 1941. In a 2001 article for In These Times, journalist Geoffrey F. X. O'Connell gives a more detailed history of these two units, saying that the 367th was chartered in March 1941, dissolved in March 1942, and was partially reconstituted as the 364th prior to their stationing in Arizona.) an all-African American regiment of the United States Army, was stationed at Camp Papago Park in Phoenix. The regiment consisted primarily of inexperienced soldiers from Louisiana who were assigned to guard the prisoner-of-war camp located in Papago Park. At the camp, the infantrymen experienced poor living conditions. Truman Gibson reported that the regiment was housed in "tar-paper shacks" that turned into "sweltering furnaces" in the summer, while an investigation by the Army found that the clothing and footwear held by the regiment was inadequate. Additionally, per Arizona historian Jim Turner, the infantrymen of the 364th received worse treatment from superiors than servicemembers who were white Americans. Turner states that, for instance, a military chaplain complained of racist and violent behavior from two white commanding officers.

While in Phoenix, the Army issued a new policy that replaced the military police (MP) of the 364th with MPs who were not a part of that regiment. According to a 2020 article in the Phoenix New Times, the Army suspected that MPs who were members of the 364th were engaging in illegal activities. As a result, the 364th MPs returned to regular duties. The 733rd Military Battalion, which was stationed at the Arizona State Fairgrounds, served as MPs for the area. This unit counted African Americans among its members. (Note: In a 2015 article in The Arizona Republic, journalist Clay Thompson described the 733rd as "a mixed-race unit".)

== Course of the riot ==
On November 26, the members of the 364th celebrated Thanksgiving. That day, the commanding officer for the 364th provided a large amount of beer for the soldiers. (Note: Concerning the quantity of beer made available to the infantrymen, multiple sources state that the men were given "all the beer they could drink".) Additionally, he also approved passes for members to leave the camp, with several choosing to go into the city center. This was the first time that they had been approved for leave in over a month.

At about 11 p.m. that night, an infantryman became engaged in an argument with a black woman and attacked her with a bottle, hitting her on her head. This occurred at a venue to the east of downtown Phoenix. (Note: Sources vary on the exact location that this event took place at. A 1942 article in Time, a 1989 book by historian Bradford Luckingham, and a 2015 article by journalist Clay Thompson of The Arizona Republic state that the venue was a cafe, with the latter two sources further specifying that it was located at the intersection of 13th Street and Washington Street. However, in a 2020 article in the Phoenix New Times, journalist Ray Stern said that the venue was a bar located near the intersection of 13th Street and Jefferson Street. Yet another source describes the venue at the source of the riot as a "brothel".) MPs from the 733rd attempted to arrest the infantryman, but he fought back against the officers and brandished a knife. During this, a crowd began to form around the building. Eventually, the MPs fired multiple gunshots. One MP shot the knife-wielding infantryman, wounding him, while another shot was fired into the air in an attempt to disperse the growing crowd. One shot was fired into the ground, but ricocheted and struck another soldier from the 364th. Following this, a fray broke out between the crowd and the MPs that lasted about 15 minutes, while another altercation between an infantryman and MPs occurred around the same time several blocks away.

Following this initial skirmish, Army officials ordered members of the 364th to return to their base, prompting about 150 servicemembers to congregate near the intersection of Washington Street and 17th Street while they waited for a bus to take them back. While waiting, a group of MPs arrived, leading to some consternation amongst the infantrymen. According to a 2020 article in the Phoenix New Times about the event, a rumor began to spread that members of the 364th were being "gunned down" by the MPs. During this, several infantrymen traveled back to Papago via car and told an exaggerated account of the situation to other servicemembers there. The infantrymen grabbed weapons from the armory, including handguns, rifles, and automatic firearms, and returned to the intersection of Washington Street and 17th Street. Once there, a shootout commenced between the MPs and members of the 364th.

Upon the initial gunfire, the large group of servicemembers quickly scattered as a riot broke out. All available local law enforcement officials were called to assist the MPs. 28 blocks in Phoenix's African-American neighborhood, centered at the intersection of Jefferson Street and 16th Street, were cordoned by the law enforcement officers, who set up a machine gun at the intersection. Armed with automatic firearms and armored cars, they proceeded to go door to door to houses in the area, as some infantrymen hid in the houses of friends in the area. According to multiple sources, police opened fire into houses where soldiers were suspected of hiding if they refused to leave the building. Contemporary coverage from The Arizona Republic described the area as resembling a "minor battlefield". In total, the firefight between the infantrymen and police lasted about three hours. By the early morning of the next day, MPs were reinforced by soldiers in armored scout cars.

== Aftermath ==
The event became commonly known as the "Thanksgiving Night Riot", the "Thanksgiving Day Riot", or the "Phoenix Massacre". It received national news coverage, being reported on by Time and The New York Times. Additionally, The Arizona Republic gave the event headline coverage in their November 27 issue. In total, roughly 100 MPs were involved in the riot. Sources vary on the number of infantrymen, with claims of 100 and 300.

=== Casualties ===
Reports vary on the exact number of people killed and injured in the riot. On November 27, both The Arizona Republic and the Associated Press reported that the riot had resulted in the death of two men and injuries to twelve others. Later coverage of the event has given a count of three deaths as a direct result of the riot. However, sources vary regarding the identity of these three individuals. Multiple sources state that all three of the fatalities were black soldiers, while journalist Clay Thompson of The Arizona Republic stated in a 2020 article that the dead included two black soldiers and one civilian. A 2020 article in the Phoenix New Times gives the identity of those killed as Robert Riley (a black civilian who lived in Phoenix), George Hunter (a U.S. Army private from New York City), and an unnamed white lieutenant. This breakdown of one officer, one civilian, and one enlisted man is also given in a 2003 book by historian Stanley Sandler. However, in a 1987 article of The Arizona Republic, journalist James Cook says that rumors place the total number of people killed as high as 19, citing an unnamed source. In addition to those killed, about a dozen individuals were wounded. This included a 17-year-old civilian—the youngest victim of the riot—and a member of the Phoenix Police Department whose toe was shot off.

=== Later history of the 364th ===
Shortly after the event, at least 150 members of the 364th were arrested, (Note: Sources vary on the exact number of people arrested. Numbers include 150, 180, and 200.) though most were released after a short time. Fifteen men received a court-martial, with fourteen receiving prison sentences and one, Joseph Sipp, receiving a death sentence. However, this death sentence was later commuted by President Franklin D. Roosevelt, who also commuted all of the other sentences. The 364th was later transferred to Mississippi, where they allegedly became involved in the Camp Van Dorn Slaughter. This later event has been denied by the U.S. Army and no definitive proof of the incident has been found, with Ray Stern of the Phoenix New Times labeling it a "conspiracy theory". The unit was later transferred to the Aleutian Islands.

=== Later history of Phoenix ===
On November 30, Colonel Ross G. Hoyt, the commanding officer of nearby Luke Field, declared the city of Phoenix off limits for soldiers stationed in the area, though he specified that the order had nothing to do with the riot and was due instead to the rising number of sexually transmitted infection cases amongst the soldiers. However, according to historian Elizabeth Tandy Shermer, this rationale may have been given as a way "to calm racial tensions". In either case, the impact of the ban was felt by retailers and business leaders in Phoenix who had benefitted from the influx of soldiers in the city and prompted a reform movement to oust the city's political leaders. Business leaders pushed for Mayor Newell Stewart to dismiss several political officials, including the chief of police, city manager, city magistrate, and city clerk. One businessman, Frank Snell, described it as resembling a "coup" or a "putsch".

=== Historical analysis of the riot ===
The riot was one of a number of high-profile incidents of civil unrest that involved African American service members during World War II, as the following year there would be multiple riots on American military bases, including Camp Shenango in Pennsylvania and Camp Stewart in Georgia. However, concerning the difference between this riot and others, Stern said in 2020, "Contemporary and modern historians are reluctant to label the bloody incident as a race riot because it differed from the more direct style of interracial violence seen the following year in Detroit and Mobile, Alabama, which involved racist attacks on Black people in addition to rioting." In contemporary coverage of the event, the Associated Press stated that the riot was primarily caused by animosity between the soldiers of the 364th and the MPs, while Time's coverage highlighted the fact that the MP who was involved in the initial arrest was a black man. However, Stern does note that racial tensions in Phoenix played a major role in the severity of the riot, saying that " interracial tension was at the root of the problem".

In 2020, historian Matthew C. Whitaker, who had been described by Stern as "one of the few scholars in Arizona who has studied the riot", said concerning the impact of the event,

There was no justice for the victims, the community was traumatized, and the lasting effects include fear and deep distrust of law enforcement (who joined in the 'riot') and the criminal justice system.

According to historian Milton A. Cohen, the event may have served as inspiration for a riot featured in John Oliver Killens's novel And Then We Heard the Thunder.

== See also ==
- Battle of Bamber Bridge
- Battle of Brisbane
- Battle of Manners Street
- Freeman Field mutiny
- Townsville mutiny
- Zoot Suit Riots

== Sources ==
- Aquallo, Alan Lechusza (2019). "Arizona". In Reid-Merritt, Patricia (ed.). A State-by-State History of Race and Racism in the United States. Vol. I. Santa Barbara, California: Greenwood Publishing Group. pp. 37–56. ISBN 978-1-4408-5601-3.
- "Two Die in Riot of Negro Soldiers". The New York Times. Associated Press. November 28, 1942. p. 28. ISSN 0362-4331. OCLC 1645522. Archived from the original on June 16, 2025.
- Burke, Flannery (2017). A Land Apart: The Southwest and the Nation in the Twentieth Century. Tucson, Arizona: University of Arizona Press. ISBN 978-0-8165-3618-4. OCLC 974565018.
- Campbell, Tracy (2020). The Year of Peril: America in 1942. New Haven, Connecticut: Yale University Press. ISBN 978-0-300-25283-5. OCLC 1153810446.
- Cohen, Milton A. (2021). Axis/Axes to Grind: Political Slants in American World War II Novels, 1945–1975. In association with Liverpool University Press. Clemson, South Carolina: Clemson University Press. doi:10.2307/j.ctv1r1nqwf. ISBN 978-1-949979-75-6. OCLC 1245960934.
- Dixon, Euell A. (January 22, 2007). "The Phoenix Thanksgiving Day Riot (1942)". BlackPast.org. Archived from the original on March 18, 2025.
- Dixon, Euell A. (June 29, 2020). "The Mystery of the 364th Infantry Regiment (1943-1945)". BlackPast.org. Archived from the original on March 27, 2025.
- Kryder, Daniel (2001) [2000]. Divided Arsenal: Race and the American State During World War II (First paperback ed.). Cambridge: Cambridge University Press. ISBN 978-0-521-00458-9. OCLC 45350931.
- Luckingham, Bradford (1989). Phoenix: The History of a Southwestern Metropolis. Tucson, Arizona: University of Arizona Press. ISBN 978-0-8165-3467-8. OCLC 18412257.
- Needham, Andrew (2014). Power Lines: Phoenix and the Making of the Modern Southwest. Princeton, New Jersey: Princeton University Press. ISBN 978-0-691-17354-2. OCLC 893784033.
- O'Connell, Geoffrey F. X. (June 11, 2001). "Missing in Action". In These Times. ISSN 0160-5992. OCLC 60620754. Archived from the original on October 4, 2024.
- Sandler, Stanley (2003). "Homefront Battlefront: Military Racial Disturbances in the Zone of the Interior, 1941–1945". In Hixson, Walter L. (ed.). The American Experience in World War II. Vol. 10: The American People at War: Minorities and Women in the Second World War. Introduction by Walter L. Hixson. New York City: Routledge. pp. 131–145. ISBN 978-0-415-94028-3. OCLC 1110391499.
- Sheridan, Thomas E. (2012). Arizona: A History (Revised ed.). Tucson, Arizona: University of Arizona Press. ISBN 978-0-8165-0693-4. OCLC 828490605.
- Shermer, Elizabeth Tandy (2013). Sunbelt Capitalism: Phoenix and the Transformation of American Politics. Philadelphia: University of Pennsylvania Press. doi:10.9783/9780812207606. ISBN 978-0-8122-4470-0. OCLC 859160752.
- Stern, Ray (November 25, 2020). "Racial Tension Stoked the Deadly 1942 Phoenix Thanksgiving Day Riot". Phoenix New Times. Voice Media Group. ISSN 0279-3962. OCLC 50264098. Archived from the original on June 16, 2025.
- Thompson, Clay (November 30, 2015) [August 24, 2015]. "Arizona 101: Bar fight in '42 became a riot". The Arizona Republic. Gannett. ISSN 2766-452X. OCLC 61312426. Archived from the original on October 1, 2022.
- "Army & Navy — The Battle of Phoenix". Time. December 7, 1942.
- Turner, Jim (2011). Arizona: A Celebration of the Grand Canyon State. Layton, Utah: Gibbs Smith. ISBN 978-1-4236-0742-7. OCLC 707231546.
- Yeager, Jamane (2011). "Arizona". In Hornsby, Alton Jr. (ed.). Black America: A State-by-State Historical Encyclopedia. Vol. I. Santa Barbara, California: Greenwood Publishing Group. pp. 35–56. ISBN 978-1-57356-976-7. OCLC 606787576.
