= Whittaker (disambiguation) =

Whittaker is a name.

Whittaker may also refer to:

- Whittaker's, J.H. Whittaker & Sons, Ltd., a New Zealand confectionery manufacturer
- Whittaker, Michigan, U.S.
- Whittaker, West Virginia, U.S.
- Whittaker, Western Australia, a locality in Western Australia

== See also ==
- Whitaker (disambiguation)
- Whitacre (disambiguation)
- Whittaker's sundew, Drosera whittakeri, a carnivorous plant
- Whittaker and Watson, colloquial name for mathematics textbook A Course of Modern Analysis
- Whittaker model and Whittaker function, mathematical spatial principles
