= African-American mutinies in the United States Armed Forces =

There have been several mutinies by African-Americans in the United States Armed Forces, often owing to racism against African Americans in the U.S. military.

== Houston Riot ==
The Houston Riot occurred in 1917 when a group of 156 African-American soldiers disobeyed orders from their superiors, seized weapons and attempted to march on the City of Houston. By the end of the riot 17 people were dead, including four police officers, nine civilians, and two soldiers. At courts-martial, nineteen soldiers were executed, and forty-one were given life sentences. The riot created a deep concern for black leaders who were not sure whether it was appropriate to praise an act of mutiny.

== World War II ==
An Australian historian claims to have uncovered information that in 1942, the 96th Engineer Battalion, an African-American battalion stationed in Townsville, Australia, mutinied in response to racial discrimination, firing 700 machine-gun rounds into occupied tents of white officers.

In 1944, a large number of African-American sailors refused to load munitions after hundreds of their fellow African-American sailors were killed in the Port Chicago disaster. The sailors were charged with mutiny and given jail sentences that were later reduced.

In 1945, the Freeman Field Mutiny, was a series of incidents at Freeman Army Airfield, a United States Army Air Forces base near Seymour, Indiana, in 1945 in which African American members of the 477th Bombardment Group attempted to integrate an all-white officers' club. The mutiny resulted in 162 separate arrests of black officers, some of them twice.

Other notable African-American mutinies of World War II include those at Dale Mabry Field, Fort Bragg, Camp Robinson, Camp Davis, Camp Lee, and Fort Dix, among others. Black soldiers fired on white soldiers in mutinies at Camp Claiborne and Brookley Air Force Base.

== USS Kitty Hawk riot ==
The 1972 USS Kitty Hawk riot has also been described as a mutiny.

== See also ==
- Battle of Bamber Bridge
- Camp Lejeune Incident
- Racism against African Americans in the U.S. military
- Military history of African Americans
