= Whiteaker =

Whiteaker may refer to:

== People ==
- Ellie Whiteaker, Australian politician
- Jaccob "yay" Whiteaker (born 1998), American esports player
- James Whiteaker (born 1998), English javelin thrower
- John Whiteaker (1820–1902), American politician who served as Governor of Oregon

== Places ==
- Whiteaker, Eugene, Oregon

== Other ==
- SS John Whiteaker, liberty ship

== See also ==
- Whitaker (disambiguation)
