= Camp Van Dorn Slaughter =

Fictional racially-motivated massacre

The Camp Van Dorn Slaughter was a racial hoax popularized in the self-published book The Slaughter: An American Atrocity by Carroll Case in 1998.

Case alleged that some 1,200 African-American soldiers of the United States Army's 364th Infantry Regiment were killed by White American soldiers at Camp Van Dorn in June 1943. Case's book, more than two-thirds acknowledged fiction, consists of two sections: Part One has 54 pages of purported history, and Part Two has 200+ pages, described by Case as a fictionalized account of the alleged events. No hard evidence has been found to support Case's allegations, despite a more than year-long investigation by the Department of Defense, and most observers have dismissed this claim of a massacre.

== Background ==
=== History of the 364th ===
The United States Army's 364th Infantry Regiment was one of numerous all-African-American regiments in the then-segregated army. The unit was originally constituted in the Regular Army as the 367th Infantry Regiment and activated on 25 March 1941 at Camp Claiborne, Louisiana. It conducted training at Camp Claiborne and also at Fort Jackson, South Carolina. The regiment included many black soldiers from the Northern states, who bristled at the Jim Crow laws and segregation in the South.

In April 1942, the regiment was selected to furnish personnel to the 24th Infantry Regiment when the latter unit became the first African American infantry unit to move overseas. In March, the 1st Battalion, 367th Infantry, was alerted for overseas service in Liberia. However, the battalion, did not leave the United States until January 1943.

In the meantime, 367th Infantry Regiment staff were unaware of the battalion's whereabouts because of its top secret mission, and thus could not requisition personnel to form a new battalion as there was no provision for a regiment with four battalions. On 9 June 1942, the 1st Battalion was officially relieved from the regiment and redesignated the 367th Infantry Battalion (Separate), while the 367th Infantry Regiment was redesignated the 364th Infantry Regiment on 10 June to avoid confusion with the 367th Infantry Battalion.

On 19 June, the 364th Infantry was assigned to Camp Florence near Phoenix, Arizona to serve as guards for the German prisoners of war held there. Phoenix was a highly segregated city, and blacks made up about 7% of the population. They and other minorities, such s Hispanics, Native Americans, and Asians, were restricted in their daily lives and rights.

=== Previous incidents ===
In November 1942, an estimated 100 soldiers of the 364th were involved in a racial incident in Phoenix known as the Phoenix Thanksgiving Day riot. In a melee that erupted in the black neighborhood of the city, where many of the 364th soldiers had gone to the bars, an expanding group reacted to a shooting and detention of some members by black military policemen from Camp Florence, and came back to the area armed. As the confrontation spread, other soldiers were assigned to the areas, and local civilian law enforcement entered the battle.

Civilians came under attack after the MPs together with other law enforcement blockaded a 28-block square area to capture soldiers who had fled into the civilian areas. In total, three people were documented as killed: an officer, an enlisted man, and a civilian, and twelve enlisted men were injured. There have been persistent claims that more civilians were killed in events that included attacks on the black neighborhood in south Phoenix in an effort to round up the soldiers. While in Phoenix, members of the 364th were also involved in other disruptive events.

== Camp Van Dorn ==
The commander of the Western Defense Command requested that the regiment be placed on some other duty or, preferably, sent overseas, as "its long retention at this station is likely to produce a deterioration in its present efficiency." The regimental commander and executive officer were replaced, and about fifty men, who "might be a source of future difficulties," were transferred from the 364th.

In May 1943, the 364th was reassigned to the Army Ground Forces for training and transferred to Camp Van Dorn, near Centerville, Mississippi, located in Wilkinson and Amite counties in the southwest of the state near the Louisiana border. This rural area along the Mississippi River was still largely devoted to cotton plantations, with the black majority of civilians dominated by whites. Centerville had only 1,200 residents, while the total population of Camp Van Dorn totaled nearly 30,000 men, with a majority being white, particularly members of the 99th Infantry Division. There were about 3,000 African American troops in the 364th Infantry, and another 3,653 African American troops assigned to other duties at the camp.

On 30 May 1943, one soldier, Private William Walker, was fatally shot by a local sheriff assisting military police at the front gate of the camp while returning to base from rest and recuperation. The commander of Army Ground Forces, Lieutenant General Lesley J. McNair, declined to acquiesce to the 364th's implied demands to be transferred to another base, and tensions remained. With the impending departure of the white troops of 99th Infantry Division, the presence of a large number of black troops at Camp Van Dorn aroused the worry of Army officials over potential future violence, and it was recommended in September 1943 that the 364th be sent overseas.

In the meantime, about 300 members of the regiment had been reassigned to other units in the US.

=== Service in Alaska ===
The Third Army, which controlled the 364th, stated that it would not be ready for overseas shipment until March 1944. In addition, none of the overseas theaters had a requirement for a separate infantry regiment. The War Department was unwilling to defer shipment of the regiment much past March, arranged for it to replace the 138th Infantry Regiment in Alaska. The 364th staged at Fort Lawton, Washington, on 31 December 1943 and sailed from Seattle on 15 January 1944, arriving in Alaska on 24 January. It was inactivated in Alaska on 15 May 1946.

== Self-published book alleging massacre of black soldiers ==
Carroll Case, a loan officer, writer and artist in McComb, Mississippi, conducted an investigation and self-published a book in 1998 alleging that some 1200 members of the all-black 364th Regiment were killed by whites in a riot at Camp Van Dorn on an unspecified date in 1943. His book, The Slaughter: An American Atrocity, published in August 1998, initially attracted little notice.

Part one is short and presents some limited historical documentation. Most of the book consists of Part Two, Case's admittedly fictional account, entitled "The Evangeline File", based on his allegations about Camp Van Dorn.

The Washington Post noted that, in his book "Case has no clear explanation of why the shootings took place, no firm date for the event nor the names of any of the other participants or victims. Although Case presents accounts from at least two other local residents who claim to have witnessed the killings, in 15 years he has never encountered a member of the 364th or any of the other 30,000 soldiers at the camp at the time who remember the alleged atrocity." Case relied on a dramatic account of a white man about the alleged massacre; his Army service record showed that he was not stationed at the camp at the time and had died by the time the book was published.

When publicity broke about the book after Case appeared on a BET show discussing it, the National Minority Military Museum Foundation, based in Oakland, California, conducted an investigation into the allegations. The organization has supported research and publicity about black military history since 1978. Spokesman Charles Blatcher said the foundation concluded that Case's claim is “not sufficiently supported by historical documentation.”

== Investigations ==
At the request of Representative Bennie Thompson (a Democrat from Mississippi) and the NAACP, the Department of Defense conducted a more than year-long investigation of the 364th Regiment and the alleged events. They concluded Case's allegations were without merit, and said in December 1999 that no hard evidence of the alleged massacre had been found. William E. Leftwich III, deputy assistant secretary of defense for equal opportunity, said the book was a "work of fiction and a marketing grab." The Army report, entitled A Historical Analysis of the 364th Infantry in World War II, was released December 23, 1999. It noted that "All of the nearly 4,000 men who were assigned to the 364th in 1943 have been traced to their separation from military service."

Kwesi Mfume, president of the NAACP, asked for another federal investigation, to be conducted by Attorney General Janet Reno and the Justice Department.

The Washington Post published an extensive account of the failures of Case to support his allegations. It reviewed the research and tracking of personnel of the unit by the Department of Defense.

== In popular culture ==
The History Channel broadcast a documentary entitled Mystery of the 364th (May 20, 2001), produced by Greg DeHart. Ray Stern of the Phoenix New Times wrote in 2020 that this documentary was "still enjoyed by conspiracy theorists".
