= John Whittaker =

John Whittaker may refer to:

- John Whittaker (UKIP politician) (born 1945), British MEP
- John Edmondson Whittaker (1897–1945), British Member of Parliament
- John Macnaghten Whittaker (1905–1984), British mathematician and university administrator
- John Whittaker (businessman) (born 1942), British billionaire
- John Whittaker (rugby league) (1950–2020), New Zealand rugby league player
- John S. Whitaker (1817–1895), Justice of the Louisiana Supreme Court
- John C. Whittaker (born 1953), American archaeologist
- John William Whittaker (c. 1790–1854), Anglican clergyman

== See also ==
- John Whitaker (disambiguation)
- Jack Whittaker (disambiguation)
