= Battle of Brisbane =

1942 riot in Australia during World War II

- Part of Anti-American sentiment during the Second World War
- Date: 26–27 November 1942
- Location: Brisbane, Australia
- Methods: Rioting, protests, looting, attacks

Parties
United States Army	Australian Army; (Australia) Civilians

Casualties and losses
None killed	1 killed (Gunner Edward S. Webster)
- Hundreds wounded on both sides

The Battle of Brisbane was a riot with United States military personnel on one side and Australian servicemen and civilians on the other, in Brisbane, Queensland's capital city, on 26 and 27 November 1942, during which time the two nations were allies. By the time the violence had been quelled, one Australian soldier was dead and hundreds of Australians and U.S. servicemen were injured. News reports of the incident were suppressed in the United States and subject to wartime censorship in Australia, with local and interstate newspapers prohibited from mentioning the reasons behind the riot in their reports of the event.

== Background ==
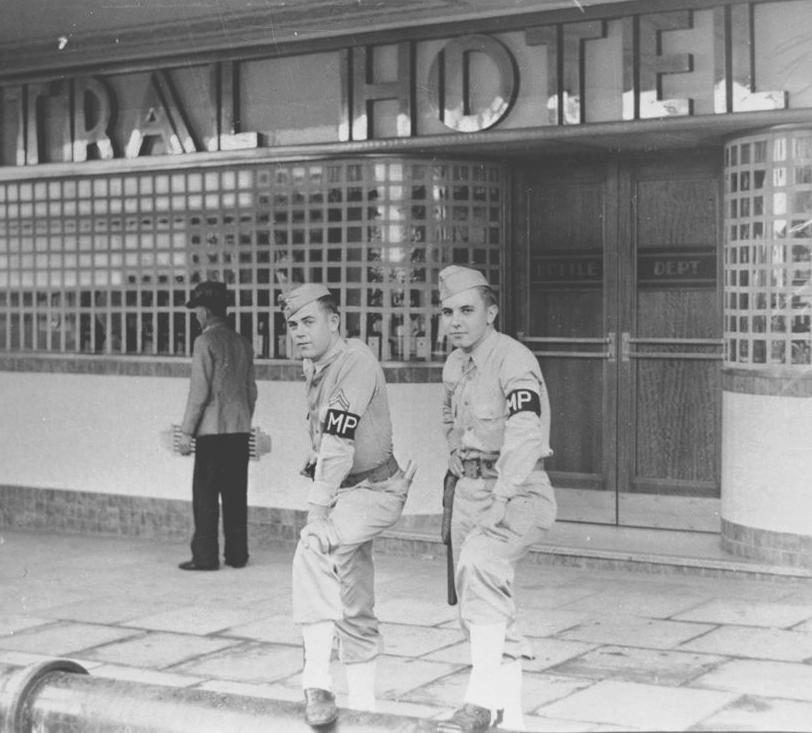
Early 1942; U.S. military police outside the Central Hotel, Brisbane. (Source: Sunday Truth, Brisbane/State Library of Queensland.)

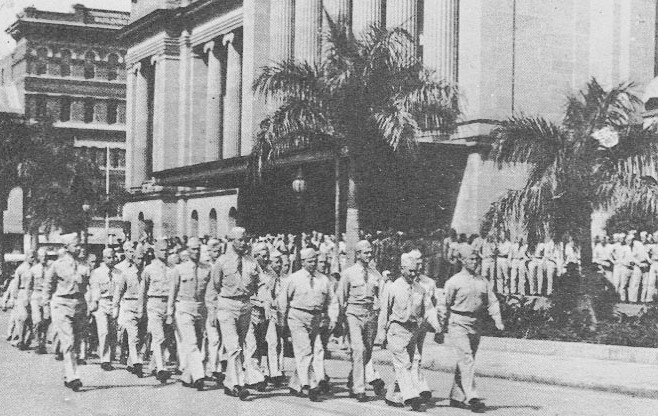
U.S. servicemen march through King George Square, Brisbane, circa 1943.

From 1942 until 1945 during the Pacific War, up to one million U.S. military personnel, which included around 100,000 African-Americans, were stationed at various locations throughout eastern Australia. These forces included personnel awaiting deployment to combat operations elsewhere in the Pacific, troops resting, convalescing, and/or refitting from previous combat operations, or military personnel manning Allied military bases and installations in Australia. Many U.S. personnel were stationed in and around Brisbane, which was the headquarters for General Douglas MacArthur, Supreme Allied Commander, South West Pacific Area. Many buildings and facilities around Brisbane were given over to the U.S. military's use. Brisbane found it difficult to cope, starting in December 1941, as their population of roughly 330,000 increased by 80,000 during the peak period. The city was fortified, schools were closed, brownouts enforced, crime increased, and many families sold up and moved inland.

At the height of the Pacific war, Australian Prime Minister John Curtin exploited American journalists to engender U.S. enthusiasm for his country's defence. This showed a new way for leaders of allied nations to utilise American press interaction to influence the White House during the war. "As a former journalist, Curtin extended his candid press talks and the fledgling Australian radio and newsreel media to involve U.S. reporters in his campaign for an escalated offensive from America’s Southwest Pacific headquarters in Brisbane, Australia," says Coatney, who wrote about the subject in his journal. Curtin still lost American press support he needed in order to prevent some of Australia's troops from fighting in the Battle of Burma.

=== Access to goods and services ===
Although the military personnel from Australia and the United States usually enjoyed a cooperative and convivial relationship, there were tensions between the two forces that sometimes resulted in violence. Many factors reportedly contributed to these tensions, including the fact that U.S. forces received better rations than Australian soldiers, shops and hotels regularly gave preferential treatment to Americans, and the American custom of "caressing girls in public" was seen as offensive to the Australian morals of the day. Lack of amenities for the Australians in the city also played a part. The Americans had PXs offering merchandise, food, alcohol, cigarettes, hams, turkeys, ice cream, chocolates, and nylon stockings at low prices, all items that were either forbidden, heavily rationed, or highly priced to Australians. Australian servicemen were not allowed into these establishments, while Australian canteens on the other hand provided meals, soft drinks, tea, and sandwiches but not alcohol, cigarettes, and other luxuries. Hotels were only allowed to serve alcohol twice a day for one hour at a time of their choosing, leading to large numbers of Australian servicemen on the streets rushing from one hotel to the next and then drinking as quickly as possible before it closed.

=== Differences in pay ===
U.S. military pay was considerably higher than that of the Australian military, (Note: The U.S. pay rate was $11.40/week (including allowances, cost of living and lower taxes, this was the equivalent to a civilian income of $69.23/week) for an unmarried American private compared to $3.50/week for an unmarried Australian private, which was equivalent to a civilian income of $18.70/week. Source: Barron's National Business and Financial Weekly, 24 April 1944 and Government of Australia legislation "Pay rates for the 2nd AIF 1939–1945") and U.S. dress uniforms were seen as more attractive than those of the Australians. The U.S. Army provided silk stockings and candy to American troops which they handed out to Australian women, as well as U.S. Army rations, in a time when Australians were on a poor diet due to rationing of food to civilians. This resulted in U.S. servicemen not only enjoying success in their pursuit of the few available women but also led to many Americans marrying Australian women, facts greatly resented by the Australians. In mid-1942, a reporter walking along Queen Street counted 152 local women in company with 112 uniformed Americans, while only 31 women accompanied 60 Australian soldiers. That it was thought necessary for the media to report this situation indicates the effect of the American presence. About 12,000 Australian women married American soldiers by the end of the war. "They're overpaid, oversexed, and over here" was a common phrase used by Australians around this time and is still recognised by some in the 21st century.

The Americans had the chocolates, the ice-cream, the silk stockings and the dollars. They were able to show the girls a good time, and the Australians became very resentful about the fact that they'd lost control of their own city.

— Sergeant Bill Bentson, U.S. Army

=== Opinions of each other's soldiers ===
Another factor in the 'battle' was the difference between the troops and the provost corps or military police. Australian military police were usually forced into a role no one else wanted and were seen as misfits. This caused the Aussie Digger to have little to no respect for them. A rule stated that the military police had to be unarmed. In Brisbane, by contrast, the military police were Americans, and had the right to be armed, and were seen as arrogant.

=== Events immediately prior ===
According to authorities, up to 20 brawls a night were occurring between Australian and American servicemen. In the weeks leading up to the Battle of Brisbane there were several major incidents. These included a gun battle between an American soldier and Australian troops near Inkerman which killed one Australian and the American; an Australian soldier was shot by an American MP in Townsville; an American serviceman and three Australian soldiers in Brisbane's Centenary Place were involved in a confrontation which killed one Australian; an American soldier was arrested for stabbing three servicemen and a Brisbane woman near the Central railway station; twenty Australians fought American submariners and members of the U.S. Navy Shore Patrol, mauling them badly. On the morning of the battle, an American MP batoned an Australian soldier in Albert Street.

== Battle ==
=== First night: 26 November 1942 ===
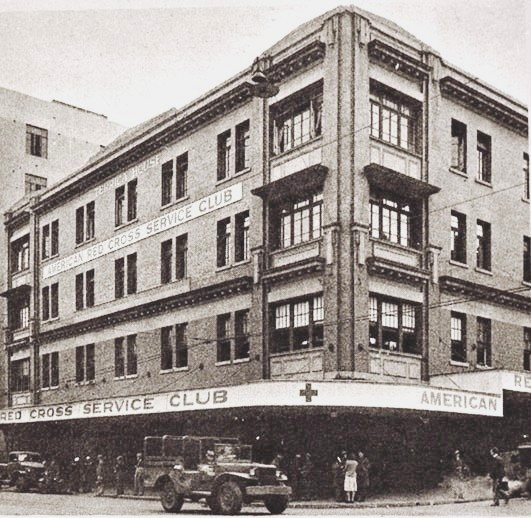
The American Red Cross Services Club, at the corner of Adelaide Street and Creek Street, along with the nearby U.S. military Post Exchange (PX), was attacked by Australian servicemen and civilians, on 26–27 November 1942.

According to Australian historian Barry Ralph, on 26 November an intoxicated Private James R. Stein of the U.S. 404th Signal Company left the hotel where he had been drinking when it closed at 6:50 p.m. and began walking to the Post Exchange (PX) on the corner of Creek and Adelaide Street some 50 metres (55 yards) further down the road. He had stopped to talk with three Australians when Private Anthony E. O'Sullivan of the U.S. 814th Military Police Company (MP) approached and asked Stein for his leave pass. While Stein was looking for it, the MP became impatient and asked him to hurry up before grabbing his pass and arresting him. At this the Australians began swearing at the MP and telling him to leave Stein alone. American MPs were not well regarded by Australians because the Australians thought they were arrogant and used batons at the least provocation. When O'Sullivan raised his baton as if to strike one of the Australians, they attacked him. More MPs arrived, blowing whistles, while nearby Australian servicemen and several civilians rushed to help their countrymen. Outnumbered, the MPs retreated to the PX, carrying the injured O'Sullivan. Stein went with them.

In the meantime, a crowd of up to 100 Australian servicemen and civilians had gathered and began to besiege the PX, throwing bottles and rocks and breaking windows. Police Inspector Charles Price arrived but could do nothing as the crowd continued to grow, with the American Red Cross Club diagonally opposite the PX also coming under siege.

"The most furious battle I ever saw during the war was that night in Brisbane. It was like a civil war."

— John Hinde (War Correspondent)

Sporadic fights broke out throughout the city. The Tivoli Theatre was closed, with servicemen ordered back to their barracks and ships, while soldiers with fixed bayonets escorted women in the city from the area. By 8 p.m. up to 5,000 people were involved in the disturbance. Several Australian MPs removed their armbands and joined in. Corporal Duncan Caporn commandeered a small truck driven by an Australian officer and three soldiers. The truck contained four Owen sub-machine guns, several boxes of ammunition and some hand grenades. The local Brisbane Fire Brigade arrived but simply looked on and did not use their hoses. The American authorities later criticised them for not doing so.

==== Death of Gunner Webster ====
The 738th MP Battalion in the PX started to arm the MPs with shotguns to protect the building and they moved to the front. People in the crowd took umbrage at this demonstration of force and attempted to relieve Private Norbert Grant of C Company of his weapon. He jabbed one Australian with his gun before Gunner Edward S. Webster, a driver with the 2/2nd Australian Anti-Tank Regiment grabbed the barrel, while another soldier grabbed him around the neck. During the scuffle, the gun was discharged three times. The first shot hit Webster in the chest, killing him instantly. The following two shots hit Private Kenneth Henkel in the cheek and forearm, Private Ian Tieman in the chest, Private Frank Corrie in the thigh, Sapper De Vosso in the thigh and Lance Corporal Richard Ledson was wounded in the left thigh and left hand and also received a compound fracture of the left ankle. Ledson was later discharged due to his injuries. Two civilians were also hit, Joseph Hanlon was wounded in the leg and 18-year-old Walter Maidment was also wounded.

In the confusion, Grant managed to run back towards the PX, hitting an Australian over the head with his shotgun, breaking the butt of his weapon while doing so. An American soldier, Private Joseph Hoffman, received a fractured skull in the scuffle.

By 10 p.m. the crowd had dispersed, leaving the ground floor of the American PX destroyed.

=== Second night: 27 November 1942 ===
On the following night, a crowd of 500 to 600 Australian servicemen gathered outside the Red Cross building. The PX building was under heavy security and heavily armed American MPs were located on the first floor of the Red Cross. NCOs went through the crowd and confiscated several hand grenades. In Queen Street, a group of soldiers armed with MP batons ran into 20 U.S. MPs who formed a line and drew their handguns. An Australian officer intervened and persuaded the American commander to take his men away from the area. The crowd then moved to the corner of Queen and Edward Streets outside MacArthur's headquarters in the AMP Building and began shouting abuse towards the building. The intersection was filled with rings of Australians beating up GIs and more than 20 were injured.

U.S. Army Sergeant Bill Bentson, who was present on both nights, recalled how he was amazed to see "Americans flying up in the air."

But after that, it sort of settled down and you go into a pub and an Aussie would come and up and slap me on the back. "Oh, wasn't that a good ruckus we had the other night? And have a beer on me."

An Australian woman Margaret Scott, from Sydney, was assaulted during the riot along with her American husband, in Edward Street. She wrote afterwards that several U.S. servicemen were beaten to death and one shot in the fighting. No official records supporting this claim are known to exist.

== Aftermath ==
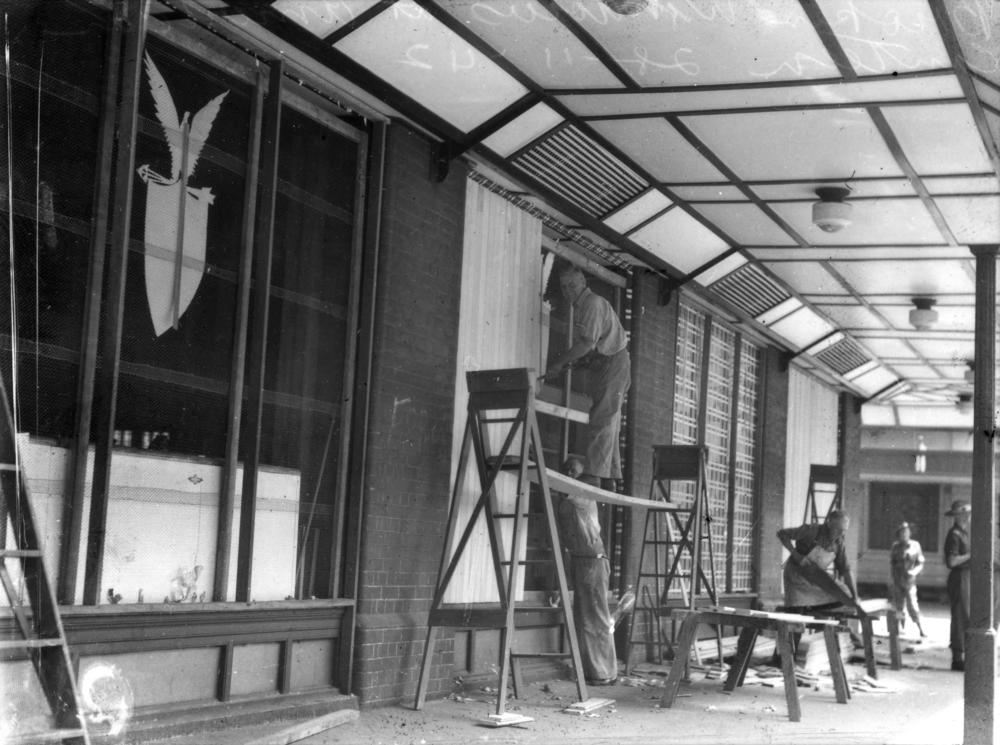
Workers repairing broken windows at the American canteen in Brisbane on 28 November 1942

On the first night one Australian serviceman was killed, eight people suffered gunshot wounds and several hundred people were injured. The second night, eight U.S. MPs, one serviceman and four American officers were hospitalised with countless others injured.

The units involved in the riots were relocated out of Brisbane, the MPs' strength was increased, the Australian canteen was closed and the American PX was relocated.

=== Courts-martial ===
Pvt. Grant was later court-martialled by the U.S. military authorities for manslaughter in relation to the death of Webster, but was acquitted on the grounds of self-defence.

Five Australians were convicted of assault as a result of the events described above, and one was jailed for six months.

The Chief Censor's Office in Brisbane ordered that "No cabling or broadcasting of details of tonight's Brisbane servicemen's riot. Background for censors only: one Australian killed, six wounded." The Brisbane Courier-Mail did publish a heavily censored article the next day about the incident. Although the article mentioned the death and injuries it did not give any idea of nationalities involved or any specific details. It is believed that the incident was never reported by U.S. media and American servicemen in Brisbane had their mail censored to remove any mention. As a result of the secrecy many rumours and exaggerated stories circulated in Brisbane over the following weeks including one saying that 15 Australian servicemen had been shot by Americans with machine guns with the bodies being piled on the Post Office steps.

Following the Battle of Brisbane, resentment towards American troops led to several smaller riots in Townsville, Rockhampton and Mount Isa. Similar riots in other states also followed: Melbourne on 1 December 1942, Bondi on 6 February 1943, Perth in January 1944 and Fremantle in April 1944.

== See also ==
- Battle of Manners Street, a similar riot in New Zealand
- Townsville Mutiny
- Zoot Suit Riots
- Battle of Bamber Bridge
- 1942 Phoenix Thanksgiving Day riot
- Freeman Field mutiny
