= Battle of Manners Street =

1943 riot in Wellington, New Zealand

- Date: 3 April 1943
- Location: Manners Street, Wellington, New Zealand; 41.2904°S 174.7757°E
- Caused by: Cultural differences between US servicemen and New Zealanders
- Methods: Rioting, protests, attacks

Parties
United States Army soldiers	New Zealand Army soldiers

Number
~500	~500

Casualties
- Deaths: 0 confirmed, 2 possible Americans
- Injuries: Dozens on both sides
- Arrested: 1 New Zealand serviceman

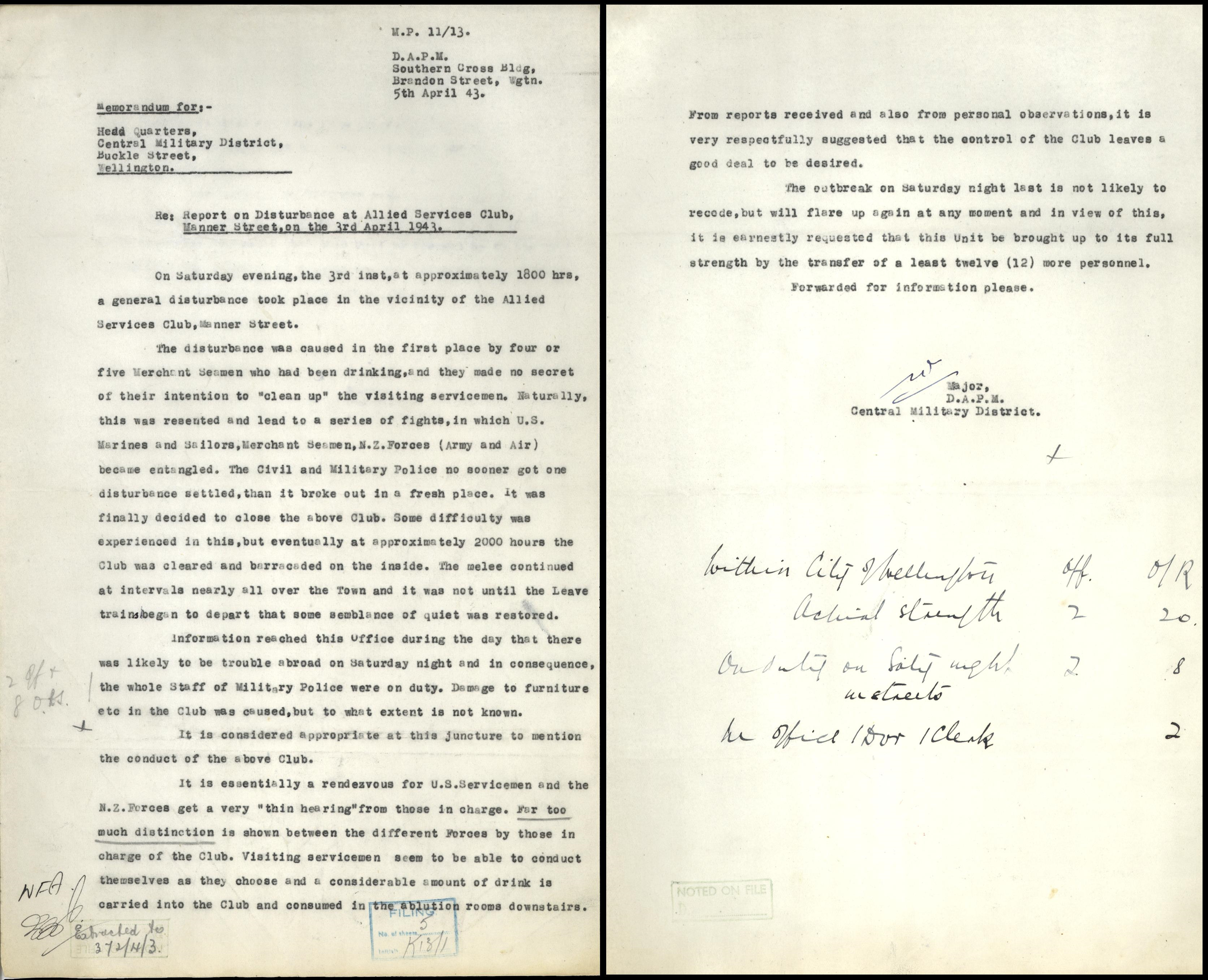
NZ Army minute describing the incident as a simple brawl between merchant seamen and servicemen

The Battle of Manners Street refers to a riot between American servicemen on one side, and New Zealand servicemen and civilians on the other which occurred outside the Allied Services Club in Manners Street, Te Aro, Wellington, in 1943. The club was a social centre, open to all military personnel.

== Background ==
During 1942–1944, between 15,000 and 45,000 American servicemen were stationed in New Zealand, mostly in camps in or near Auckland and Wellington. There were cultural differences between Americans and New Zealanders. New Zealand women found the US servicemen to be polite, and they had more money than New Zealand soldiers. This led to romantic liaisons between American troops and New Zealand women, sparking calls of an "American invasion". Many New Zealand soldiers resented the idea of relationships between New Zealanders and American soldiers, leading to tense relations between the two parties.

Another source of tension was US servicemen's attitudes towards Māori. White soldiers from the American south were not comfortable socialising with Māori soldiers. In 1942, the New Zealand government published a guide book for US servicemen, titled Meet New Zealand Guide, which reminded the Americans that "the Maori today occupy a position in society socially and politically equal to that of any pakeha or white New Zealander". A memo sent to the Prime Minister's office said that New Zealanders should "be friendly and sympathetic towards the coloured American troops—but remember that they are not accustomed in their own country to close and intimate relationships with white people". Anyone finding themselves in the company of both white and black American troops was advised to "avoid unpleasantness".

The Allied Services Club was set up in the former Waldorf Restaurant in Manners Street in July 1942, as a place where soldiers could socialise and get a meal. The club was staffed by volunteers and featured a buffet counter, a dance floor, a lounge, and an inquiries office. The club was intended primarily for soldiers from overseas, but was open to anyone serving in the war.

== Riot ==
During this time period, hotel bars closed at 6pm and masses of inebriated patrons were subsequently ejected into the streets. This was known colloquially as the 'six o'clock swill'. Around 6pm on 3 April 1943, fighting broke out between US servicemen and New Zealand soldiers and civilians outside the Allied Services Club. The brawl spread to the ANA (Army, Navy, and Air Force) Club in Willis Street and to Cuba Street, continuing for hours. Civilian and military police attempted to break up the fights, but they only subsided once the US soldiers left town on trains back to their camps.

Reports of the riot vary. One version states that some American servicemen in the Allied Services Club objected to Māori soldiers also using the club, and began to stop Māori soldiers from entering. Many New Zealand soldiers in the area, both white and Māori, combined in opposition. The stand-off escalated when Americans took off their belts to attack those who wanted to let Māori back in. Supposedly, over a thousand servicemen and hundreds of civilians were involved, and it was rumoured that two Americans were killed during the riot.

An eyewitness recalled that there was a huge crowd gathered around Manners Street. Several men would be fighting, surrounded by hundreds of people cheering. American shore patrol police with batons knocked out the troublemakers, loaded them on to flat-deck trucks, and took them away.

The Commissioner of Police downplayed the riots at the time, telling the Evening Post that although "there was certainly a bit of a skirmish" by a "small crowd", nobody had been injured, hospitalised, or killed. He said that one [drunken] civilian had been arrested and faced court proceedings, one New Zealand serviceman had been dealt with by military authorities, and no US servicemen had been arrested or charged.

An army major wrote in an internal memo just after the event that the army had prior intelligence that trouble might occur, and had all its military police on duty that night. He said that the disturbance was caused by a few merchant seamen who had been drinking and decided to "clean up" the Americans, which led to fighting. The major said that furniture at the club was damaged before the club was closed and barricaded at around 8pm. The Army's press release "for information, if any queries raised" stated that a British sailor and a Marine started fighting and were encouraged by "loutish" civilians before Marines and drunken New Zealand soldiers joined in. This report states that four civilians were arrested.

News of the riot was censored at the time, leading to a mythos around the event. Recent research has not shown any evidence that over a thousand people were involved or that the brawl was racially motivated, and it is possible that this incident was conflated with other similar disturbances. For example, on 27 April 1943 two men were arrested after a large and "nasty" fight erupted at the Basin Reserve between New Zealand and US troops, and in October 1943 a group of American servicemen and Māori civilians came to blows at Ōtaki over vandalism and insults to a Māori woman. A fight on 12 May 1945 in Cuba Street involved over 150 Māori and US servicemen. This fight was racially motivated: Māori troops were angry at their treatment by the Americans, who tended to treat them the way they treated African-Americans. Military reports stated that, "Maori from whom statements were taken allege they have been insulted by the Americans and have been told by Americans not to ride in the same tramcars and that they should walk via back streets etc., that the Americans call them black curs etc. and have generally insulted the Maori race". This event did not attain the notoriety of the 'Battle of Manners Street'.

== See also ==
- Battle of Brisbane, a similar riot in Australia, 1942
- Townsville mutiny
- Zoot Suit Riots in 1943 in Los Angeles
- Battle of Bamber Bridge, a similar riot in England, June 1943
- 1942 Phoenix Thanksgiving Day riot
- Freeman Field mutiny
