= Jack Whittaker =

Jack Whittaker may refer to:

- Jack Whittaker (lottery winner) (1947–2020), American businessman
- Jack Whittaker (politician), Canadian member of parliament

== See also ==
- Jack Whitaker (1924-2019), American sportscaster
- Jack Whitaker (equestrian) (born 2001), British show jumper
- John Whittaker (disambiguation)
- John Whitaker (disambiguation)
