= William Whittaker =

William Whittaker may refer to:

- Red Whittaker (William L. Whittaker), roboticist and research professor of robotics at Carnegie Mellon University
- Bill Whittaker (bowls), former lawn bowls competitor for New Zealand
- Bill Whittaker (footballer) (1922–1977), footballer for Charlton Athletic, Huddersfield Town, Crystal Palace and Cambridge United
- Bill Whittaker (journalist) (1930–2009), Australian horse racing journalist
- William G. Whittaker (1876–1944), English composer

== See also ==
- William Whitaker (disambiguation)
