= Whitaker (disambiguation) =

Whitaker is a surname.

Whitaker may also refer to:

== Places ==
- Whitaker, Indiana, U.S.
- Whitaker, Kentucky, U.S.
- Whitaker, Pennsylvania, U.S.

=== Facilities and structures ===
- The Whitaker, Rawtenstall, Rossendale, Lancashire, England, UK; a museum
- Whitaker Airport, an airport near Oakland, Oregon, U.S.
- Whitaker's Field, a property near Ojai, California, U.S
- Whitaker Center for Science and the Arts, in Harrisburg, Pennsylvania, U.S.

== Groups, organizations ==
- Whitaker Foundation, an organization that supports biomedical engineering research and education
- Whitaker and Baxter, an American political consulting firm

== Other uses ==
- Whitaker's Almanack, a British reference book
- Whitaker baronets, a title in the Baronetage of the United Kingdom
- HMS Whitaker, more than one ship of the Royal Navy

== See also ==
- Whitaker House (disambiguation)
- Whittaker (disambiguation)
- Whiteaker (disambiguation)
- Whitacre (disambiguation)
- Whitaker Bank Ballpark, is a stadium in Lexington, Kentucky
- William Whitaker's Words, a computer program that parses the inflection or conjugation of a Latin word
