= Matthew Whitaker (disambiguation) =

Matthew Whitaker (born 1969) is an American lawyer and politician who served as the Acting US Attorney General from November 2018 to February 2019.

Matthew Whitaker may also refer to:

- Matthew Whitaker (pianist) (born 2001), American jazz pianist
- Matthew C. Whitaker, American historian
- Matthew Whittaker, Irish Gaelic footballer
