= Townsville mutiny =

1942 US Army mutiny in Australia during WWII

- Part of World War II
Date	22–23 May 1942
Location	Townsville, Queensland, Australia
Result	Mutiny suppressed

Belligerents
United States: United States Army (African American soldiers)	United States: United States Army (White soldiers); Australia: Australian Army

Casualties and losses
At least 1 killed	

The Townsville mutiny was a mutiny by African American servicemen of the United States Army while serving in Townsville, Australia, during World War II.

About 600 African American troops from the 96th Battalion, US Army Corps of Engineers, were stationed at a base outside of Townsville called Kelso Field. They were a labor battalion and their main job was to build bridges and barracks. On 22 May 1942, aiming to kill their commander, Captain Francis Williams of Columbus, Georgia, the black troopers began firing machine guns at the tents of white officers, resulting in an eight-hour siege. At least one person was killed and dozens severely injured, and Australian Army soldiers were called in to roadblock the rioters.

== Background ==
In August 1942, amidst the backdrop of World War II, approximately 7,258 African American servicemen were stationed in Australia. Among them was the 96th Engineers General Services Regiment airfield construction Battalion, tasked with constructing the Upper Ross airfield near Townsville. However, tensions erupted on April 15, 1942, when around 100 men from the 96th Battalion were involved in a confrontation in Townsville. By May 22, 1942, tensions reached a boiling point. In response to racial taunts and abuse from white officers, African American troops led by "A" and "C" Companies, launched a riot at their camp.

== Mutiny ==
African American soldiers fired machine guns and anti-aircraft weapons into the tents where their white counterparts were gathered. More than 700 rounds were fired during the confrontation, resulting in fatalities and severe injuries among both the African American and white troops. The chaos reverberated through the night, with locals initially mistaking the gunfire for military exercises. Australian Army units intervened by setting up roadblocks to contain the rioting troops.

== Aftermath ==
Arthur Kelso, a local resident, recalled hearing the gunfire from his property and witnessing the aftermath. Reports circulated of coffins being ordered to bury those killed in the riot, although this remains unconfirmed. Meanwhile, Dick Kelso, Arthur's brother and a member of the 11th Brigade, participated in efforts to quell the unrest, manning a roadblock armed with live ammunition and Bren Guns.

American journalist Robert Sherrod wrote a report on the mutiny but it was suppressed, as future US president Lyndon B. Johnson, then a young congressman, was visiting Townsville at the time. The mutiny was revealed by a historian in 2012.

== See also ==
- Battle of Brisbane
- Battle of Manners Street
- Battle of Bamber Bridge
- Zoot Suit Riots
- Freeman Field mutiny
- 1942 Phoenix Thanksgiving Day riot
- Camp Logan Mutiny, a mutiny by 156 soldiers from the all-black 24th Infantry Regiment of the United States Army.
- List of conflicts in Australia
- 1942 in Australia
