= Mark Whittaker =

Australian writer

- Born: Mark Cornelius Whittaker; 29 July 1965 (age 61); Sydney, New South Wales, Australia
- Education: Newington College
- Occupations: Journalist, non-fiction writer, writing coach
- Spouse: Amy Willesee
- Children: 4
- Parent: Bill Whittaker (father)
- Website: www.markwhittakerwritingcoach.com

Mark Cornelius Whittaker (born 29 July 1965) is an Australian journalist, non-fiction writer and writing coach. He lives in Berry, New South Wales.

== Early life ==
Whittaker was born in Sydney, New South Wales, the son of horse racing journalist Bill Whittaker, and attended Newington College (1978–1983).

== Career ==
In 1985 Whittaker commenced as a copy boy with News Limited and became a staff writer on The Weekend Australian Magazine in 1993. Seven years later he left the Magazine to travel around Australia and write. In 2005, his book Sins of the Brother was made into a television mini-series, Catching Milat.

He regularly writes for the Good Weekend magazine and The Australian newspaper.

In 2016, SBS Australia ran a 5-part podcast series called Out of Sight: The Untold Story of Adelaide’s Gay Hate Murders which was written and narrated by Whittaker. The series highlighted gay-hate crimes, including the murder of George Duncan, The Family Murders, and the deaths of David "John" Saint (d. April 1991), Robert Woodland (d. 2004), and Andrew Negre (d. April 2011). The series also connected to SBS's Deep Water (TV series) and its related documentary about other unsolved gay hate crimes in Sydney. In 2019, he investigated the death of Jimmy O'Connell to write and narrate a podcast about the murder, Blood Territory, for Audible.

== Awards ==
- 2002 – With wife and co-author, Amy Willesee, won the Asia-Pacific Travel Writing Award for their book on the Kathmandu royals murders
- 2005 – Walkley Award for Magazine Feature Writing for The Weekend Australian article "Ordinary Heroes" about the people who attempted to rescue Sophie Delezio and Molly Wood from a burning childcare centre
- 2006 – News Ltd's News Award for Features Journalist of the Year
- 2012 – Kennedy Award for Newspaper Feature Writing for a story about false allegations of sexual assault made against rugby league player Brett Stewart

== Books ==
- Granny Killer: The story of John Glover, Mark Whittaker and Les Kennedy (Sydney, Collins/Angus & Robertson 1992) ISBN 0-207-17766-X
- Sins of the Brother: The definitive story of Ivan Milat and the Backpacker Murders, Mark Whittaker and Les Kennedy (Sydney, Macmillan 1998) ISBN 0-7329-0968-6
- The Road to Mount Buggery: A journey through the curiously named places of Australia, Mark Whittaker and Amy Willesee (Sydney, Pan Macmillan 2001) ISBN 0-7329-1111-7
- Walking to Victory, Adam Gilchrist with Mark Whittaker (Sydney, Macmillan 2003 ISBN 0-7329-1138-9
- Love & Death in Kathmandu: A strange tale of royal murder, Mark Whittaker and Amy Willesee (Sydney, Macmillan 2003) ISBN 0-7329-1177-X
- Ten Years, Roseanne Catt with Mark Whittaker and Amy Willesee (Sydney, Pan Macmillan Australia 2005) ISBN 0-7329-1190-7
- Bomber: From Vietnam to hell and back, Mark Whittaker and Tony Bower-Miles (Sydney, Pan Macmillan Australia 2009) ISBN 978-1-4050-3935-2
- Brave: Ordinary Australians and their extraordinary acts of courage, Mark Whittaker (Sydney, Pan Macmillan Australia 2011) ISBN 978-1-4050-3987-1
- Village Vets, Anthony Bennett & James Carroll with Mark Whittaker (Sydney, ABC Books 2015) ISBN 9780733335839
