= William Whitaker =

William Whitaker may refer to:

- William Whitaker (theologian) (1548–1595), English theologian
- William Whitaker (Puritan ejected minister) (1629–1672), English ejected minister
- William Whitaker (geologist) (1836–1925), British geologist
- William Whitaker (pioneer) (1821–1888), American pioneer
- William Whitaker (MP) (1580–1646), English lawyer and politician who sat in the House of Commons from 1640 to 1646
- William Whitaker (equestrian) (born 1989), English show jumper
- Bill Whitaker (journalist) (born 1951), American journalist
- Bill Whitaker (American football) (born 1959), American football defensive back

== See also ==
- William Whittaker (disambiguation)
- Whitaker (disambiguation)
- William Whitaker's Words, a computer program for Latin morphology
