= George Whitaker =

George Whitaker may refer to:

- George Whitaker (Canadian educator) (1811–1882), Canadian clergyman and educator
- George Whitaker (sport shooter) (1864–1937), British sport shooter
- George Whitaker (Oregon educator) (1836–1917), American clergyman and university president
- George P. Whitaker (1803–1890), American politician and industrialist from Maryland
- George William Whitaker (1840–1916), painter from Providence, Rhode Island

== See also ==
- George Whittaker (disambiguation)
- Whitaker (surname)
