= Charles Whittaker =

Charles Whittaker may refer to:

- Charles Evans Whittaker (1901–1973), associate justice of the United States Supreme Court
- Charles Whittaker (cricketer) (1819–1886), English cricketer
- Charles Richard Whittaker (1879–1967), British anatomist

== See also ==
- Charles Whitaker (c. 1642–1715), English politician
- Slim Whitaker (Charles Orbie Whitaker, 1893–1960), American film actor
