= John S. Whitaker =

American judge (1817–1895)

John Smith Whitaker (also spelled John S. Whittaker; March 8, 1817 – March 11, 1895), was an American lawyer and judge who served as a district court judge in New Orleans during the American Civil War. He was commissioned as an associate justice of the Louisiana Supreme Court in 1863, but declined the appointment. He also served as corporation attorney for New Orleans and was the author of Sketches of Life and Character in Louisiana (1847).

== Early life, education, and career ==
Born in New Bedford, Massachusetts, to Rev. Jonathan Whitaker and Mary Kimball, his father was a Unitarian minister and a graduate of Harvard University. In his infancy, Whitaker's family moved to Charleston, South Carolina, where he was raised and educated. At 18 he began teaching in New York and South Carolina. At about 19 he became principal of Monroe Academy in New York, and he later served as first assistant at Charleston High School.

While teaching, Whitaker read law under prominent Charleston attorney James L. Petigru, and gained admission to the bar in South Carolina bar in 1838, subject to reaching the age of 21. Around 1840, Whitaker moved to New Orleans, where he taught while continuing to study civil law. In 1845 he became professor of English at Mandeville College in St. Tammany Parish, Louisiana, and later its president. On the advice of Eighth District Judge Martin G. Penn, Whitaker returned to law and was admitted to the Louisiana bar on May 22, 1845. He was corporation attorney for New Orleans in 1846 and 1847, then entered private practice, first with John C. Larue and, after Larue's death, with J. Q. A. Fellows, a former student. In 1847 Whitaker published a book, Sketches of Life and Character in Louisiana: The Portraits Selected Principally from the Bench and Bar, , containing biographies of Louisiana figures, primarily from the legal profession.

== Judicial service and later life ==
Whitaker "was an outspoken Union man" during the Civil War, and joined the Republican Party after the election of Abraham Lincoln. Following the Capture of New Orleans by Union forces in 1862, military governor George Foster Shepley appointed Whitaker judge of the Second District Court of Orleans Parish. A contemporary biography says he was the first judge Shepley appointed after the occupation. While on the district court, Whitaker was commissioned by Shepley as associate justice of the Louisiana Supreme Court under the Union-controlled state government. However, the court never convened, and Whitaker returned the commission, declining to serve under Charles A. Peabody, who was also judge of the United States Provisional Court and had been commissioned chief justice. Whitaker resigned his district judgeship in 1864. Governor Michael Hahn nominated him as chief justice of the Louisiana Supreme Court, but was not confirmed by the state Senate.

After leaving the bench, Whitaker returned to private practice in New Orleans. In 1864, he declined entreaties to run for governor of Louisiana. From April to July of that year, he wrote leading editorials for the New Orleans Times during the state constitutional convention. He spent about a year in Missouri and for several years worked as an assistant attorney for the United States government in the Alabama Claims. In 1869, Dartmouth College awarded him an honorary Master of Arts, and though he never attended college himself, contemporaries described him as a scholar of classical literature. He also served several years as a director of the New Orleans public schools. Whitaker practiced law into his early seventies. In Kingsbury v. Whitaker (1880), a Louisiana Supreme Court case over the validity of a will, he was named executor of the estate, and appeared as counsel for the defendants and appellants.

== Personal life and death ==
In 1847 Whitaker married Mary Millard, daughter of Alfred Millard, with whom he had one son and one daughter. Their son, John T. Whitaker, graduated from the University of Louisiana and joined his father's practice.

Whitaker died in New Orleans, three days after his 78th birthday, and was buried in Lafayette Cemetery No. 1.
