= Jason Whittaker =

Jason Whittaker may refer to:

- Jason Whittaker (cricketer) (born 1971), English cricketer
- Jason Whittaker (Adventures in Odyssey)
- Jason Whitaker
