= Thomas Sheridan (anthropologist) =

Thomas E. Sheridan (born 5 September 1951) is an anthropologist of Sonora, Mexico and the history and culture of Arizona and the Southwest. He was selected a Distinguished Outreach Professor at the University of Arizona, and has been affiliated with the Department of Anthropology and the Southwest Center since 2003.

== Background ==
Sheridan's family moved to Phoenix, Arizona at the age of 3. He left the South West after high school, attended Reed College (briefly) before returning and graduated from the first incarnation of Prescott College in Arizona in the 1970s. He became interested in Northern Mexico and travelled there frequently for study, spending months in Bahía Kino in 1971. He completed a PhD on the Yaqui in 1983. He directed the Mexican Heritage Project at the Arizona Historical Society from 1982 to 1984, and was Curator of Ethnohistory and then Director of the Office of Ethnohistorical Research at the Arizona State Museum in Tucson from 1984 to 2003.

He lives on a ranch in the Alta Valley, west of Tucson, AZ.

== Scholarship ==
Sheridan's initial scholarship was on the history and culture of the Yaqui in Sonora, north west Mexico, and native ranchers around the municipio of Cucurpe in Sonora. He combined studies of livelihoods, with the historical unfolding of Native and colonial interactions over the centuries. In the 1990s he wrote a widely read account of the history of Arizona, Arizona: a history, revised in 2012.

In 2015 he published Moquis and Kastiilam with a number of Hopi and other scholars, telling the story of the encounters in northern Arizona between the Hopis and Spaniards from 1540 until the Pueblo Revolt of 1680. For the first time, Spanish archival material is supplemented with oral traditions recounted by Hopi elders. The book details Spanish abuses during efforts to missionize the Hopi, who thereafter were able to resist colonization.

Since the late 1990s Sheridan has also been involved in numerous coalitions and working groups to preserve the desert of southern Arizona, and promoting working ranches as a conservation mechanism, particularly to control urban sprawl. He describes this as merging the interests of scientists, environmentalists and land users, and as an effort to avoid "chewing up the West" through fragmentation and real estate development. The approach is detailed in Charnley et.al., 2014. He is an advocate of "working landscapes" and served on the committee that developed the Sonoran Desert Conservation Plan.

== Publications ==
- Sheridan, T.E., S. Koyiyumptewa, A. Daughters, D. Brenneman, TJ Ferguson, L. Kuwanwisiwma, and L. Lomayestewa. 2015. Moquis and Kastiilam: Hopis, Spaniards and the Trauma of History, Vol. I. Tucson: University of Arizona Press.
- Charnley S., T.E.Sheridan and Gary P. Nabhan (eds.). 2014. Stitching the West Back Together: conservation of working landscapes. University of Chicago Press.
- Sheridan, T.E. 2012. Arizona: A History. Revised Edition, 1st ed. 1995. Tucson: University of Arizona Press.
- Sheridan, T.E., W. Broyles, G. Nabhan, G. Hartmann and M. Thurtle. 2011. Last Water on the Devil’s Highway: A Cultural and Natural History of Tinajas Altas. Tucson: University of Arizona Press.
- Sheridan, T.E. 2006. Landscapes of Fraud: Mission Tumacácori, the Baca Float, and the Betrayal of the O’odham. Tucson: University of Arizona Press.
- Sheridan, T.E. 1999. Empire of Sand: The Seri Indians and the Struggle for Spanish Sonora, 1645-1803. Tucson: University of Arizona Press.
- Sheridan, T.E. and D. Guy. 1998. Contested Ground: Comparative Frontiers on the Northern and Southern Edges of the Spanish Empire. Tucson: University of Arizona Press.
- Sheridan, T.E. 1998. A History of the Southwest: The Land and Its People. Southwest Parks and Monument Association.
- Sheridan, T.E. and C.Polzer (eds.). 1997. The Presidio and Militia on the Northern Frontier of New Spain, 1700‑1760, Vol. II, Part A: Baja California and Sinaloa‑Sonora. Tucson: University of Arizona Press.
- Sheridan, T.E. and N. Parezo. 1996. Paths of Life: American Indians of the Southwest and Northern Mexico. Tucson: University of Arizona Press.
- Sheridan, T.E. 1988. Where the Dove Calls: The Political Ecology of a Peasant Corporate Community in Northwestern Mexico. Tucson: University of Arizona Press.
- Sheridan, T.E. 1986. Los Tucsonenses: The Mexican Community in Tucson, 1854‑1941. Tucson: University of Arizona Press.
- Sheridan, T.E. and T. Naylor (eds.). 1979. Rarámuri: A Tarahumara Colonial Chronicle, 1607‑1791. Flagstaff: Northland Press.

== Awards ==
- Sonoran Institute Faces of Conservation: Sustainable Communities Award (2007)
- Alene Dunlap Smith and Paul Smith Award for Lifetime Achievement, Tucson Pima County Historical Commission (2016)
- Byron Cummings Award from the Arizona Archaeological and Historical Society (2016).
