= George Whittaker =

George Whittaker may refer to:

- George Whittaker (Papua New Guinean politician) (1904–1964), member of the Legislative Council of Papua and New Guinea
- George Whittaker (Canadian politician) (1919–2013), member of the House of Commons of Canada
- George Byrom Whittaker (1793–1847), English bookseller and publisher

== See also ==
- George Whitaker (disambiguation)
