= Kati Whitaker =

British radio and television journalist

Kati Whitaker is a British BBC and independent radio and television journalist. She has taken on the various roles of producer, reporter and presenter working in the field of current affairs and documentary.

== Radio career ==
Whitaker studied Philosophy, Politics and Economics (PPE) at Somerville College, Oxford. She was awarded a master's degree in 1977. She then trained in law.

Whitaker began her career working as a current affairs producer at BBC World Service before rapidly moving on to be the weekly presenter of the live Radio 4 disabilities programme Does He take Sugar for nearly ten years; one of the regular presenters of the Sunday programme (religious news and current affairs) on Radio 4; reporter for BBC Breakfast; an attachment as bi-media health correspondent to BBC South; and news reporter and presenter for digital TV company The Medical Channel for whom she also took entire responsibility for their documentary output. Whitaker has also made over a hundred radio documentaries including Crossing Continents, File on 4 and The World Tonight.

She now has a production company which makes documentaries for BBC Radio. She also makes videos and works as a media trainer and presentational coach.

== Recent work ==
- Executive producer/producer: Cuban Voices for BBC World Service (2019)
- Producer/presenter: The pity of War for BBC World Service
- Executive producer/producer: Friends and foes, a landmark ten-part series on the history of diplomacy for BBC Radio 4
- Producer: Destroyer of worlds Radio 4 archive about the British contribution to the atom bomb
- Producer: Special Relationship: Uncovered about the Anglo American political relationship
- Producer: Churchill's record box
- Presenter: This train rides again about the March on Washington
- Presenter: Night of the Long Knives, a Radio 4 archive hour about Harold Macmillan
- Presenter/producer: No country for old women about Ghana witchcamps for BBC World Service

== Awards ==
- c. 1990 Medical Journalists' Association Silver Award for Does He Take Sugar
- 2002 One World Award for radio documentary
- 2002 Sony Awards (shortlisted)
- 2006 Education Journalist of the Year Award for Outstanding Education Reporting
- 2017 Best Current Affairs Documentary/Feature Maker (nominated)
