= Brian Whittaker =

Brian Whittaker may refer to:

- Brian Whittaker (footballer) (1956–1997), Scottish footballer
- Brian Whittaker (music producer) (fl. 2000s–2020s), American record producer, songwriter and recording artist
- Brian Whitaker (born 1947), or Whittaker, British journalist and writer
