= Rod Whitaker =

Rod Whitaker may refer to:

- Trevanian (Rodney William Whitaker, 1931–2005), American film scholar and writer
- Rod Whitaker (rugby league) (born 1963), rugby league footballer
- Rodney Whitaker (born 1968), American jazz double bass player and educator
