= Joseph Whitaker =

Joseph Whitaker may refer to:

- Joseph Whitaker (industrialist) (1789–1870), American iron master and landowner
- Joseph Whitaker (naturalist) (1850–1932), English naturalist
- Joseph Whitaker (ornithologist) (1850–1936), Sicilian-English ornithologist, archaeologist and sportsman
- Joseph Whitaker (publisher) (1820–1895), English publisher who founded Whitaker's Almanack

== See also ==
- Joseph Whitaker School, Nottinghamshire, United Kingdom, named after Joseph Whitaker (naturalist)
- Joseph Whittaker (1813–1894), British botanist
