= Neil Whitaker =

Australian rules footballer

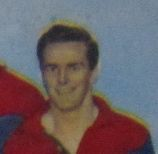

Personal information
- Full name: Neil Whitaker
- Born: 9 April 1931
- Died: 4 October 2008 (aged 77)
- Original team: Ivanhoe Amateurs
- Height: 180 cm (5 ft 11 in)
- Weight: 77.5 kg (171 lb)

Playing career^{1}
Years	Club	Games (Goals)
1952–53	Melbourne	10 (1)
- ^{1} Playing statistics correct to the end of 1953.

Neil Whitaker (9 April 1931 – 4 October 2008) was an Australian rules footballer who played with Melbourne in the Victorian Football League (VFL).
