= Thomas Whittaker =

Thomas or Tom Whittaker may refer to:

- Thomas Bartlett Whitaker (born 1979), American criminal, former Texas Death Row inmate
- Thomas Whittaker (martyr) (1614–1646), English Roman Catholic priest
- Thomas Whittaker (metaphysician) (1856–1935), English metaphysician and critic
- Thomas Sherren Whittaker (1868–1914), British Isles rugby union footballer
- Thomas Whittaker (politician) (1850–1919), British politician
- Tom Whittaker (footballer) (1898–1956), football player and manager of Arsenal F.C.
- Tom Whittaker (mountaineer) (born 1948), disabled mountaineer, the first disabled person to climb Mount Everest
- Tom Whittaker (rugby union) (born 1986), English rugby union footballer
- Tom Whittaker (trade unionist) (died 1995), English trade union leader
- Thomas W. Whitaker (1904–1993), American botanist and horticulturist
- T. K. Whitaker (1916–2017), Irish economist and public servant
- Thomas Dunham Whitaker (1759–1821), English clergyman and topographer
- Thomas Whittaker (rugby league), rugby league footballer who played in the 1900s and 1910s
