= Frederick Whitaker (disambiguation) =

Frederick Whitaker (1812–1891) was the 5th Premier of New Zealand. The name may also refer to:

- Frederick Alexander Whitaker (1847–1887), member of the New Zealand House of Representatives and son of the Premier
- Frederick Arthur Whitaker (1893–1968), British civil engineer
