= Anthony Whittaker =

English composer

Anthony John Whittaker-Mahoney (born 1968) is an English composer. His first musical experiences were in the local church choir age 7 and as a tenor recorder player; he did not begin formal study of the piano until 1982 with Peter Wild. Lessons with Ann Bond on the organ followed in 1986. After acquiring the LRAM diploma in 1989, ARCO and LTCL in 1991, he graduated from the University of London in 1994 BMus (hons).

Composition became increasingly important for Whittaker during the 1990s where he composed for staff and students at the Performing Arts department of Liverpool Community College. His MMus and PhD degrees are from the University of Liverpool where he studied with James Wishart (1957–2018) and the American composer, Ben Hackbarth.

Notoriety came in 2000 with the SPNM performance of Drift for six pianos which was performed alongside Steve Reich's music for 6 pianos; the principal pianist was Joanna MacGregor.

Choral music became important after this time;Agnus Dei (TTBB) received performances in Berlin and Montreal. A Litany also for TTBB was performed at the International Eisteddfod and broadcast on S4C television in 2002. Larger commissions followed. For example, The Prodigal Son for choir 2 pianos and percussion 2005.

Chamber music has also played an important part in the composer's output. A string Quartet was written in 2005; Indiscretions with Sarabande was written for the Baroque ensemble L'indiscret in 2007. A second string quartet and the Clarinet Quintet were completed in 2009 during a long period in the Far East, Singapore and Taiwan; Another Place for chamber orchestra was finished in 2014. Whittaker's largest project to date is a choral suite with Genghis Khan as the protagonist. The piano piece Micro-Sonatina forms part of the Beethoven 250 project created by the German pianist Susanne Kessel and was premiered in 2018 in Bonn, Germnany. It is published in Volume 6 of the project by Editions Musica Ferrum.

Some of the early choral pieces are published by the Welsh firm Curiad;recent projects have included educational music initially concentrating on early to intermediate levels and more advanced solo works for the violinist Steven Wilkie and oboist, Manon Lewis. Scree for oboe and piano is published by Forton Music. Whittaker's setting of Psalm 150 was premiered in Nairobi Cathedral in July 2017.

== List of major works ==
- Therapy Suite 2023 (Chamber Orchestra)
- Equals 2021 (Brass Quintet)
- Fifteen Impressions for Piano 2021(Piano)
- Ten New Adventures for Violin and Piano 2021 (Violin and Piano)
- Hit it! 2021 (Tenor Saxophone)
- Distance 2020 (Piano Trio) - Festival Osmose 2020, Belgium
- Cambiando Argomento 2020 (String Orchestra)
- Summon a River 2019 (SATB)
- Micro-Sonatina 2018 (Piano) - 250 pieces for Beethoven, Bonn
- Air from Air 2017 (Horn) - 15 minutes of Fame performance - For Sam Bessen
- Dialogando 2017 (Flute and Alto Flute) - Recorded by Iwona Glinka on Two Minutes album
- Psalm 150 2017 (SATB and Organ) Nairobi Cathedral
- Fête de chambard 2016 (Organ) Recorded by Kevin Bowyer on Organ Party Volume 4
- Preludium Jubilate 2016 (Organ)
- In Fruitful Order, Move! 2016 (SATB and Organ)
- Cantilena 2016 (Horn and Piano)
- Scree 2015 (Oboe and Piano)
- Serenata 2015 (Violin and Piano)
- They Started Dancing 2015 (Flute Ensemble)
- A La Mode - 12 pieces for solo piano 2015 (Piano)
- Bassoon Sonata 2015 (Bassoon and Piano)
- Night Piece 2014 (Piano)
- Another Place 2014 (Chamber Orchestra)
- Preludium Improvisations 2013 (Piano)
- Music for Genghis: Conflicts and Ease 2013 (Suite: Soprano, Alto, Baritone Solo, SATB and Ensemble)
- Altered Arabesque 2012 (Saxophone & Piano)
- Intermèdes 2011 (Chamber Orchestra)
- Fractal Nocturne 2011 (Harpsichord)
- Clarinet Quintet 2009,
- String Quartet No 2 2009,
- Resquiat in Pace 2 2008 (SSA),
- Resquiat in Pace 1 2008 (SATB),
- Indiscretions with Sarabande 2007 (L'indiscret),
- Esquisse 2006 (Flute, Harp, Viola),
- The Prodigal Son 2005 (TTBB 2 Pianos & Perc.),
- String Quartet 2005,
- Es war ein alter König 2004 (SSAA),
- Contour Cantor 2004 (Piano solo),
- Lullaby-Fall-Repose 2003 (Viola & Marimba),
- Coelos Acendit 2003 (SA div. & Piano),
- Sinfonietta - Hearing Voices 2002,
- Tensio 2002 (Clarinet and Piano),
- Concertino for Piano and Guitar 2002,
- A Litany 2002 (TTBB),
- Jailbreak 2001 (Large ensemble),
- Agnus Dei 2001 (TTBB),
- Impact 2000 (Ensemble),
- Drift 2000 (Six pianos).
