= Benjamin Whitaker =

Benjamin Whitaker may refer to:

- Benjamin Whitaker (surveyor general), American politician
- Ben Whitaker (politician) (1934–2014), British Labour Party politician
- Benjamin J. Whitaker (1956-2022), professor of chemical physics
- Ben F. Whitaker (died 1954), American businessman, racehorse owner
- Ben Whittaker, Australian rugby player
- Benjamin Whittaker, British boxer
