= Battle of Bamber Bridge =

1943 mutiny of American servicemen

- Part of the Western Front of World War II
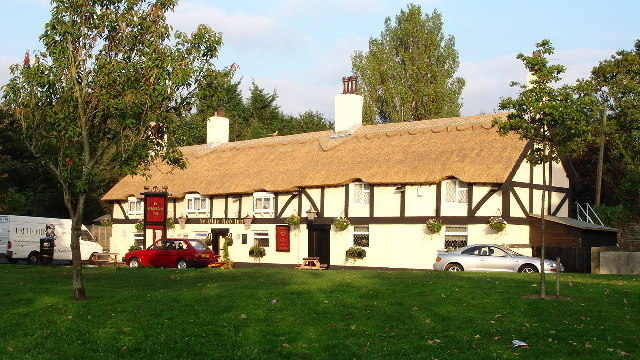
- Ye Olde Hob Inn, where the violence started
- Date: 24–25 June 1943
- Location: Bamber Bridge, Lancashire, England, United Kingdom; 53.7217°N 2.6621°W
- Caused by: Racial tensions between soldiers after the Detroit Race Riot
- Result: 234th US Military Police Company Victory: Mutiny put down; 32 arrested and tried for mutiny

Parties
234th US Military Police Company	1511th Quartermaster Truck Regiment (United Kingdom) Local residents

Casualties
- Deaths: 1
- Injuries: 7
- Charged: 32, charged with mutiny
- Location of Bamber Bridge Battle of Bamber Bridge (the United Kingdom)

The Battle of Bamber Bridge is the name given to an outbreak of racial violence involving American soldiers stationed in the village of Bamber Bridge, Lancashire, in northern England in 1943, during the Second World War.

Tensions had been high following a failed attempt by U.S. commanders to racially segregate pubs in the village, and worsened after the 1943 Detroit race riot. The battle started when white American military police (MPs) attempted to arrest several Black soldiers from the racially segregated 1511th Quartermaster Truck Regiment for being out of uniform, a violation of the US Army Code of Conduct, in the Ye Olde Hob Inn public house in Bamber Bridge.

Amid a confrontation on the street afterwards that turned violent, a white MP shot and killed Private William Crossland. More military police then arrived armed with machine guns and grenades, and black soldiers armed themselves with rifles from their base armoury. Both sides exchanged fire through the night. In the end, a court martial convicted 32 African American soldiers of mutiny and related crimes, and they received sentences ranging from three months to 15 years. However, following a review of the case, one man was released and the sentences for the rest were reduced. The last soldier convicted in the case was released after serving 13 months.

== Background ==
During the Second World War, Bamber Bridge hosted American servicemen from the 1511th Quartermaster Truck Regiment, part of the Eighth Air Force. Their base, Air Force Station 569 (nicknamed "Adam Hall"), was on Mounsey Road, part of which still exists now as home to 2376 (Bamber Bridge) Squadron of the Royal Air Force Air Cadets. The 1511th Quartermaster Truck was a logistics unit, and its duty was to deliver materiel to other Eighth Air Force bases in Lancashire. The 234th US Military Police Company was also in the village, on its north side.

Racial segregation in the United States Armed Forces was strictly enforced and the 1511th Quartermaster Truck Regiment was composed almost entirely of black enlisted men. All but one of the unit's officers and all the MPs were white. Military commanders tended to treat Army service units as "dumping grounds" for less competent officers and the leadership in the unit was poor.

Racial tensions were exacerbated by the Detroit race riot of 1943 earlier that week, which had led to 34 deaths, of which 25 were black.

According to Anthony Burgess, the people of Bamber Bridge supported the black troops and when US commanders demanded a colour bar in the village, all three pubs reportedly posted "Black Troops Only" signs, although Harold Pollins found no information of this and deemed Burgess' story of the troops arming themselves with machine guns incorrect.

== Outbreak of violence ==
On the evening of 24 June 1943, soldiers of the 1511th Quartermaster Truck Regiment were drinking with English villagers in Ye Olde Hob Inn. Details of how the incident developed differ between sources. Two MPs, Corporal Roy A. Windsor and Private First Class Ralph F. Ridgeway, responded to a report of trouble at a pub. It was closing time, and the barmaid had refused a drink to the soldiers. The MPs had standing orders to arrest soldiers who were out of camp without a pass, disorderly, or not in proper uniform. On entering the pub, they encountered one soldier, Private Eugene Nunn who was dressed in a field jacket rather than the required class A uniform, and asked him to step outside. An argument ensued, with local people and British soldiers gathering. One British soldier challenged the MPs, asking "Why do you want to arrest them? They're not doing anything or bothering anybody."

Staff Sergeant William Byrd, who was black, defused the situation but, as the MPs left, a beer was thrown at their jeep. After the MPs picked up two reinforcements, they spoke to Captain Julius F. Hirst and Lieutenant Gerald C. Windsor, who told the MPs to do their duty and to arrest the black soldiers. MPs intercepted the soldiers on Station Road as they returned to their base at Mounsey Road. As a fight broke out, the MPs opened fire, and one bullet struck Private William Crossland of the 1511th in the back and killed him.

Some of the injured black soldiers returned to their base, but the killing caused panic as rumours began to spread that the MPs were out to shoot black soldiers. Although the colonel was absent, acting CO Major George C. Heris attempted to calm the situation. Lieutenant Edwin D. Jones, the unit's only black officer, managed to persuade the soldiers that Heris would be able to round up the MPs and see that justice was done.

At midnight, several jeeps full of MPs arrived at the camp, including one improvised armoured car armed with a large machine gun. That prompted the concerned black soldiers to arm themselves. Around two thirds of the rifles were taken, and a large group left the base in pursuit of the MPs. British police officers reported that the MPs set up a roadblock and ambushed the soldiers.

The black soldiers warned the locals to stay inside when a firefight broke out between them and the MPs, which resulted in seven wounded. The fighting stopped around 04:00 the next morning with an officer, three black soldiers, and one MP having been shot and two other MPs beaten. Eventually, the soldiers returned to the base, and by afternoon all but four rifles had been recovered.

== Arrests and courts martial ==
By one later account, the violence left one man dead and seven people (five soldiers and two MPs) injured. Although a court martial convicted 32 black soldiers of mutiny and related crimes, poor leadership and racist attitudes among the MPs were blamed as the cause. None of the white MPs were charged, including the one who killed Crossland by shooting him in the back.

Two trials were conducted. In August, four of the black soldiers involved in the initial brawl were sentenced to hard labour, one to two and a half years and the others to three, and all to dishonourable discharges, with one of those convictions being overturned on review. The second trial involved 35 defendants. It concluded on 18 September with seven acquittals and 28 convictions. Sentences for those convicted ranged from three months to 15 years, with seven sentences of 12 years or more. Reviews resulted in the release of one man and reductions of all other sentences. Fifteen of the men returned to duty in June 1944 and six other sentences were further reduced. The defendant with the longest sentence returned to duty after serving 13 months.

General Ira C. Eaker, commander of the Eighth Air Force, placed most of the blame for the violence on the white officers and MPs, citing their poor leadership and use of racial slurs. To prevent similar incidents, he combined the trucking units into a single special command. The ranks of that command were purged of inexperienced or racist officers, and the MP patrols were racially integrated. Morale among black troops stationed in England improved, and the rates of courts-martial fell. Although there were several more racial incidents between black and white American troops in Britain during the war, none were on the same scale as Bamber Bridge.

In 1945 Nevil Shute used the incident as material for his fictional account of wartime racism The Chequer Board published in 1947. Author Anthony Burgess, who lived in the Bamber Bridge area after the war, wrote about the event briefly in The New York Times in 1973 and in his autobiography, Little Wilson and Big God. Jacob Cloete's 2017 novel Return to Oundle Street has the Battle of Bamber Bridge as part of the background.

Popular interest in the event increased in the late 1980s after a maintenance worker discovered bullet holes from the battle in the walls of a Bamber Bridge bank.

== Aftermath ==
The Battle of Bamber Bridge was one of the several instances during World War II where racial tensions and clashes erupted between American soldiers on foreign soil. Clashes between American soldiers and local forces took place in Australia at the "Battle of Brisbane", and in New Zealand at the "Battle of Manners Street".

The event has been described as a "precursor to battles that would unfold on American streets for decades to come, during the Civil Rights era".

== Commemoration ==
In June 2013, to commemorate the 70th anniversary of the incident, the University of Central Lancashire held a symposium. It included a screening of the 2009 documentary Choc'late Soldiers from the USA (Note: "A landmark documentary explores how African American soldiers and British civilians formed an unexpected bond during World War II", which had its world premiere at the Smithsonian Institution's National Museum of African American History and Culture on 10 November 2009.) which was produced by Gregory Cooke, and a performance of Lie Back and Think of America, a play written by Natalie Penn of Front Room, which had played at the Edinburgh Fringe Festival.

In June 2022, a memorial garden commemorating the battle was created opposite the pub where the Battle of Bamber Bridge started. The incident inspired the plot of the film The Railway Children Return.

== See also ==
- Battle of Brisbane
- Battle of Manners Street
- Townsville mutiny
- 1942 Phoenix Thanksgiving Day riot
- Zoot Suit Riots
- Freeman Field mutiny
- African-American mutinies in the United States Armed Forces
