= Fred Whittaker =

Fred Whittaker may refer to:

- Fred Whittaker (footballer), English professional footballer
- Fred Whittaker (soccer) (born 1923), Canadian professional soccer player
