= Eric Whitaker =

Eric Whitaker may refer to:

- Eric E. Whitaker (born 1964/1965), American physician
- Eric P. Whitaker (born 1957), American diplomat
- Eric Whitaker (born 1966), member of the United States 1991 Rugby World Cup squad

== See also ==
- Eric Whitacre (born 1970), American composer
