= 96th Engineer Battalion =

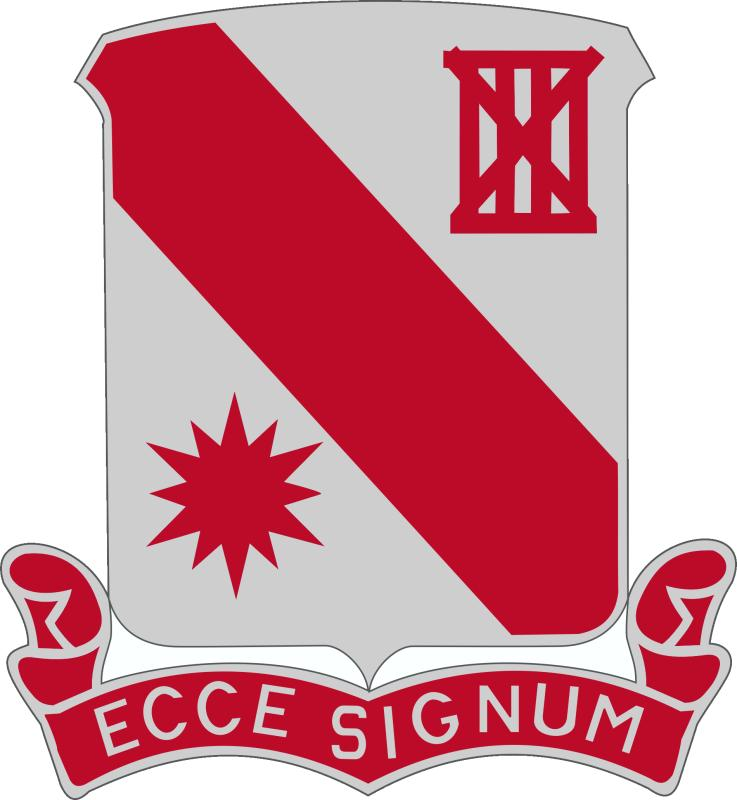
- 96th Engineer Battalion distinctive unit insignia
- Active: 1 June 1941–15 February 1946
- Country: United States
- Branch: United States Army Corps of Engineers
- Type: Engineer battalion
- Motto: "Ecce Signum" (Latin: Behold the Sign)
- Engagements: World War II; Pacific War; Dutch East Indies campaign; Kokoda Track campaign; New Guinea campaign; Philippines campaign; Townsville mutiny

The 96th Engineer Battalion was a military engineer unit in the United States Army. The battalion, which was composed mainly of African-American troops, served during World War II and was also known as the 96th Engineer General Service Regiment.

== History ==
The 96th Engineer Battalion was activated as the 9th Engineer Battalion (Separate) at Fort Bragg on 1 June 1941. It embarked at New York on 4 March 1942 and arrived in Australia on the north-eastern coast of Queensland, on 9 April 1942.

Troops from US 96th Engineers were stationed at a base on Townsville's western outskirts known as Kelso. This was the site for a large-scale siege lasting eight hours known as the Townsville mutiny, which was sparked by racial taunts and violence. The soldiers took to the machine guns and anti-aircraft weapons and fired into tents where their white American counterparts were drinking, killing one, severely injuring dozens and expending 700 rounds.

After this they were stationed at Port Moresby on 28 April. On 29 July 1942 it was redesignated the 96th Engineer General Service Regiment, and moved to the Philippines on 22 April 1945, where it was inactivated on 15 February 1946.

== See also ==
- Townsville mutiny
