= Whitacre =

Whitacre may refer to:

== Places ==
- Nether Whitacre, England
- Over Whitacre, England
- Whitacre, Virginia, US
- Whitacre Heath, England

== Family name ==
Whitacre is an English and Scottish toponymic surname, meaning the white acre

- Edward Whitacre Jr. (born 1941), American business executive
- Eric Whitacre (born 1970), American composer
- John J. Whitacre (1860–1938), American businessman and politician
- Mark Whitacre (born 1957), American business executive
- Nimrod Whitacre (1822–1892), American politician from Virginia

== Other uses ==
- Whitacre College of Engineering, Texas Tech University in Lubbock, Texas
- Whitacre Junction railway station, England
- Whitacre Tower, Dallas
- Pumping Station, Whitacre Waterworks, Warwickshire

== See also ==
- Whitaker (disambiguation)
- Whittaker
