= Bill Whittaker (journalist) =

Australian horse racing journalist

Bill Whittaker (1930 in Queensland – 2009 in Sydney) was in the horse racing hall of fame in Melbourne for being a horse racing journalist.
