= John Whitaker =

John Whitaker may refer to:

- John Whitaker (equestrian) (born 1955), English showjumper
- John Whitaker (gymnast) (1886–1977), English gymnast
- John Whitaker (historian) (1735–1808), English historian and Anglican clergyman
- John Whitaker (Iowa politician) (born 1956), American politician from Iowa
- John A. Whitaker (1901–1951), American politician from Kentucky
- John N. Whitaker (1940–2001), American neurologist and immunologist
- John Thompson Whitaker (1906–1946), American writer and journalist
- Johnny Whitaker (born 1959), American actor
- Jack Whitaker (1924–2019), American sportscaster

== See also ==
- John Whittaker (disambiguation)
