= Matthew C. Whitaker =

American historian

- Born: Phoenix, Arizona, U.S.
- Occupation: Historian

Academic background
- Education: Arizona State University (BA, MA); Michigan State University (PhD)

Matthew C. Whitaker is an American historian. He was an associate professor of history and the founding director of the Center for the Study of Race and Democracy at Arizona State University (ASU); in January 2016 ASU announced that he had resigned these positions.

Whitaker became the subject of public controversy in Arizona when he was demoted, but temporarily retained on the faculty of Arizona State University despite being found to have committed "significant" plagiarism. He was placed on administrative leave on September 17, 2015, while the university investigated allegations that "his behavior has fallen short of expectations as a faculty member and a scholar." On January 15, 2016, ASU released a statement that Whitaker would immediately step down from his center co-directorship and would resign his faculty position effective May 2017.

== Career ==
Whitaker was born and raised in Phoenix.

Whitaker earned a Bachelor of Arts (BA) in history, a Master of Arts (MA) in history, and a BA in sociology from Arizona State University, and a PhD in history from Michigan State University. Whitaker founded the university's Center for the Study of Race and Democracy and served as its first director. He was formerly Foundation Professor of History and Director of the Center he founded, but he was removed from the positions on June 26, 2015, as disciplinary measures due to plagiarism.

His work has focused on racial equality, civil rights, and African-American history. Whitaker's 2005 book, Race Work: The Rise of Civil Rights in the Urban West, deals with the history of the civil rights movement in Phoenix, with a focus on the lives of Lincoln and Eleanor Ragsdale.

In 2014, Whitaker was cited in several publications in the wake of the Ferguson shooting speaking about the effect of social media on movements. The Washington Post quoted him in the context of actualization, and Nonprofit Quarterly used the same quote in a roundup article on the biggest nonprofit stories in relation to technology and millennials.

He was also an opponent of Arizona's religious freedom bill, having written an op-ed column for CNN in the wake of it having been passed by the Arizona legislature, where he called it a "right to discriminate" bill: "Under the guise of religious freedom, however, the bill would enable businesses potentially to discriminate against virtually anyone". The quote was then cited by a poll article on Cleveland.com showcasing both sides of the debate. The bill was later vetoed by Arizona governor Jan Brewer.

Whitaker is also owner of The Whitaker Group, a consulting firm that has provided cultural training to the Phoenix Police Department. In 2015, following a series of controversies over police treatment of black citizens both in Phoenix and nationally, the Phoenix police contracted with the Whitaker Group for "cultural consciousness" training.

== Controversy ==
=== 2011 investigation ===
In 2011, it was alleged that Whitaker had plagiarized several entries in a reference work he edited, African American Icons of Sport: Triumph, Courage, and Excellence. Specifically, he was accused of lifting ideas and text from Wikipedia, books, and a newspaper article without citation. An ASU investigation, led by historian Jane Maienschein, into Whitaker's works found "occasional carelessness" but no "substantial or systematic plagiarism."

The committee stated that in the case of Race Works: The Rise of Civil Rights in the Urban West, there were two passages that "seemed to follow (though not exactly copy)" passages from Bradford Luckingham's Minorities in Phoenix. The committee concluded that Whitaker credited the author of the book in his footnotes, acknowledged his "intellectual debt" to the author in his introduction to the book, and made it clear that he was "drawing from (and citing) Luckingham's work" and therefore, "a review of Race Works in its totality reveals that [Whitaker] did acknowledge his sources".

In African American Icons of Sport, the committee found that the sourcing in several of Whitaker's essays was "problematic", and that there was "clear taking of the words of others." However, because the introduction states that the book is "derivative", and since it was written for youthful readers, and since juvenile non-fiction often does not "include references or notes", the committee decided that the problems fell short of plagiarism. The committee concluded that "these instances were not significant nor that they constituted a preponderance of evidence of a systematic intent to deceive."

==== Subsequent events ====
Historian Monica Green resigned from her position as chair of ASU's Department of History's Promotion and Tenure Committee, asserting that the investigation was "manipulated by the administration in a way I felt was guaranteed to produce the result." According to the Arizona Republic, Whitaker wrote a letter to ASU, in which he questioned whether it was the political or racial aspect of the speech that provoked his critics at the university, rather than the alleged plagiarism. He wrote that his accusers were "out to get me" and that "the question of the motive of my accusers cannot be ignored, including racial bias, resentment and harassment against a black professor promoted to full professor over their objections." Green, who is also black, denied that racism was involved, saying "The issue is professional competence and professional ethics, and that's all it is."

The Arizona Republic asked Jonathan Bailey, a former journalist and consultant on copyright and plagiarism, to evaluate a major public speech given by Whitaker at a political rally in October 2010, called to protest Arizona SB 1070, a controversial Arizona immigration law. Bailey found that 30% of the speech was taken from published sources, including a 2006 Washington Post article, "U.S. Immigration Debate is a Road Well Traveled."

=== 2015 investigation ===
Questions of plagiarism were raised again in 2014, this time with regard to a new book, Peace Be Still: Modern Black America from World War II to Barack Obama. Inside Higher Ed published examples of alleged plagiarism found by other historians. A blog called "Cabinet of Plagiarism" also published examples of Whitaker's apparent plagiarism.

Late in 2014, ASU asked professors Karin Ellison of ASU and Keith Wailoo of Princeton University to closely examine Whitaker's book. Ellison reported that not only did they find multiple "identical phrases" in Whitaker's book and his often unattributed source material, they found that some of the "main elements" covered in his book were "parallel" to those found in other sources. She suggested that the university could launch a formal investigation. Professor Wailoo, writing to an ASU official on January 9, 2015, stated that in Peace Be Still Whitaker had "failed in numerous instances to follow the standard rules of attribution, even for a history textbook," and that his method, sometimes called rogeting, "appears to be one of copying several sentences from another source, modifying those sentences slightly, avoiding quotations, retaining the overall structure and argument of the original source, and either neglecting or avoiding citation. The pattern of this practice is sporadic but repeated; it shows a recurring disregard for crediting the original author of the idea."

On July 1, 2015, Whitaker wrote a letter of apology to the ASU faculty. He indicated that he had informed the ASU administration of the situation, was working or correcting the errors, and apologized for any embarrassment he may have caused.

However, Professor Wailoo noted in one example that the revisions failed to remedy Whitaker's breaches of the standards of scholarly citation: although Whitaker had placed quotation marks around some material in his section on Freedom Riders, he failed to "acknowledge that the entire section" appears to have been lifted from the website BlackPast.org. According to Wailoo, Whitaker's proposed revisions "do not sufficiently or effectively address the core issue of the book's indebtedness to other sources."

The formal ASU investigation found "significant issues." Digital Journal credited the Whitaker case with bringing renewed attention to the issue of technology-enabled plagiarism.

==== Subsequent events ====
Doug MacEachern wrote an op-ed in Arizona Central criticizing those who he felt enabled Whitaker, particularly the Phoenix police department.

In an editorial published at the beginning of the fall semester, 2015, the ASU student newspaper, The State Press, published an editorial asserting that if Whitaker was a student, he would be expelled, and demanding that Whitaker be subject to the same standards that students are held to.

The investigation ultimately led to his being placed on administrative leave as of September 17, 2015. On January 15, 2016, ASU released to the media a statement that Whitaker had resigned from the ASU faculty effective May 2017, and was no longer co-director of the Center for the Study of Race and Democracy.

=== 2015 Whitaker Group controversy ===
Phoenix Councilman Sal DiCiccio called for the cancellation of a one-year contract under which Whitaker was to be paid $268,800 to provide "cultural consciousness" training for the Phoenix Police Department. The contract had been granted by a 4–0 vote of the Phoenix City Council two weeks after Whitaker had been informed that he was to be disciplined by ASU: Assistant Chief Mike Kurtenbach said that Whitaker needed to be hired quickly and that the department had reviewed his qualifications. DiCiccio said, in a statement released to the media, "Phoenix police insisted that this contract was thoroughly vetted, which now turns out to be false," that "the Council and the public were duped into believing this was a non-issue," and that "those who pushed for this contract should be fully held accountable." The contract was approved in May, after Whitaker had already begun the training sessions (in April).

On July 14, 2015, Whitaker terminated his contract with the City of Phoenix.

In August 2015, DiCiccio requested that The Whitaker Group, a consulting company founded and owned by Whitaker to refund $21,800 paid to Whitaker for the creation of a slide set the Group created to train Phoenix police officers. DiCiccio stated in a report that through his own investigation, 52 of the 84 slides in the set the Whitaker Group claimed to have created for the Phoenix Police Dept. were "exact copies or slides with just minor changes," from Chicago police cultural training material, and that The Whitaker Group had marked the copied Chicago slides with a copyright symbol indicating that the Group had copyrighted the Chicago material. The Chicago Police Department stated that the training slides were not meant to be shared with a for-profit corporation, and that they were provided to ASU Police Chief Michael Thompson "by request" and for "internal use" only.

Whitaker Group denied the accusations, saying: "The Whitaker Group, L.L.C. expressly notified the Phoenix Police Department that 83 percent of the material content it intended to utilize in training derived from the Chicago Police Department," adding that the Chicago police were "fully aware that [the company] was providing training to the Phoenix Police Department."

In a letter sent to Whitaker on August 24, 2015, the City of Phoenix stated that the Whitaker Group had "breached the contracts by supplying the city with written materials created by others," and demanded that he refund the money paid him by the city for training materials. On October 14, 2015, the City of Phoenix brought suit against The Whitaker Group, LLC, Whitaker, and his wife for $21,900. In April 2017, an arbitrator ruled in favor of Whitaker.

== Diamond Strategies, LLC ==
Whitaker founded a new consulting firm, Diamond Strategies, LLC, described as "diversity, equity, and inclusion consultants," in 2016.

== Bibliography ==
As author

- Race Work: The Rise of Civil Rights in the Urban West, University of Nebraska Press, 2005.
- Peace Be Still: Modern Black America from World War II to Barack Obama, University of Nebraska Press, 2013.

As editor

- African American Icons of Sport: Triumph, Courage, and Excellence, Greenwood, 2008.
- Hurricane Katrina: America's Unnatural Disaster, University of Nebraska Press, 2009.
- Icons of Black America: Breaking Barriers and Crossing Boundaries (3 vol.), Greenwood, 2011.
