= Black dandyism =

Black cultural movement and fashion style

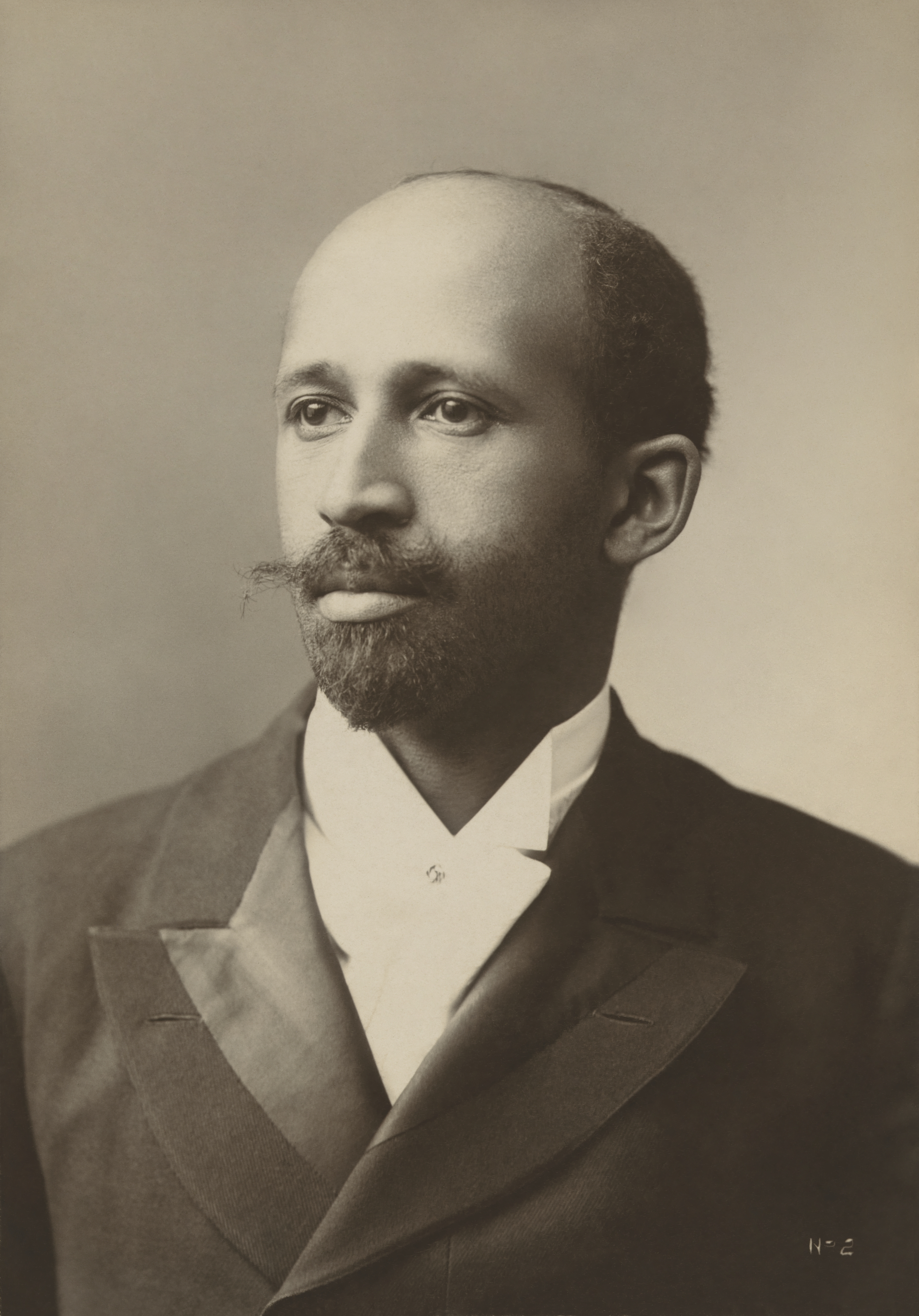
W.E.B. Du Bois in 1907

Black dandyism is a cultural movement and fashion style in which Black people use clothing and personal style, specifically the historically European sensibility of the dandy, as a form of self-expression and a way to address societal limitations. Beginning in the late-nineteenth century and early-twentieth century after Emancipation, with much traction especially gained during the Harlem Renaissance, it was chosen as the Met Gala's theme for 2025.

== History ==
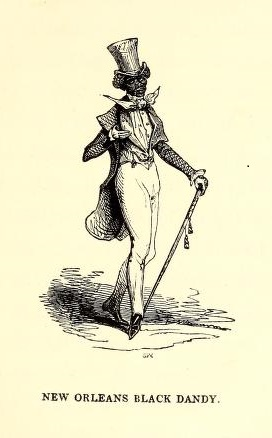
A New Orleans 'black dandy' character from "Mrs. Houstouns Yachting" (New World, 1844)

While Black dandyism existed in the 19th-century, Black dandyism as a cultural movement began in the early 20th century and was inspired by dandy, an aesthetic of finding individuality "by being impeccably groomed and dressed," from the 18th century. Specifically, it came about after the time of Emancipation and during the Harlem Renaissance when Black individuals took on "European-style" fashion, like the zoot suits worn in dance halls, in order to show autonomy in the face of racial discrimination and societal restriction. In addition to the Harlem Ranaissance's flourishing of music, literature, and the arts writ large, Black individuals were compelled to also champion and experiment with a new sense of "visual identity" through clothing.

One mass gathering of the Black dandyist aesthetic was the Silent Protest Parade, in 1917, during which over ten thousand Black individuals in formal wear marched down Fifth Avenue, in New York City's Manhattan, to protest Jim Crow-era discrimination. Decades later, in 1943, countless Black, Latino, and Asian men, all dressed up in zoot suits, were assaulted by police officers and servicemen amid the Zoot Suit Riots as backlash against the style's adoption by minority communities.

Henceforth, Black dandyism found resonance in the subsequent Black power movement, with practitioners such as Dizzy Gillespie, Langston Hughes, James Baldwin, Sammy Davis Jr., Malcolm X, and Kid Creole. More recently, Black dandyism has been exhibited and reimagined in fashion shows by designers like Dior, Balmain, Martine Rose, and Thom Browne, and looks shown by Michael Jackson, Chadwick Boseman and Kai-Isaiah Jamal, as well as by women like Janelle Monáe and Doechii, have been identified as more recent representations of the style.

== Aesthetics ==
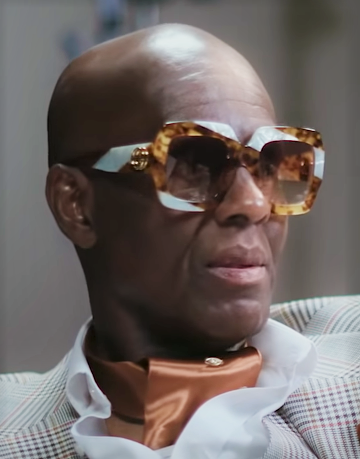
Dapper Dan in 2019

As an aesthetic of combined cultures, Black dandyism is generally characterized by its dynamic blend of classical styles with modern sensibilities. Monica L. Miller, a professor of African studies at Barnard College, wrote that Black dandyism was a response to the history of slavery in the United States wherein Africans "arrived in America physically and metaphorically naked, a seeming tabula rasa on which European and new American fashions might be imposed." Black dandyism was thus a means to reclaim the Black body, through the act of clothing, and find self-affirming articulations of Blackness against existing impositions.

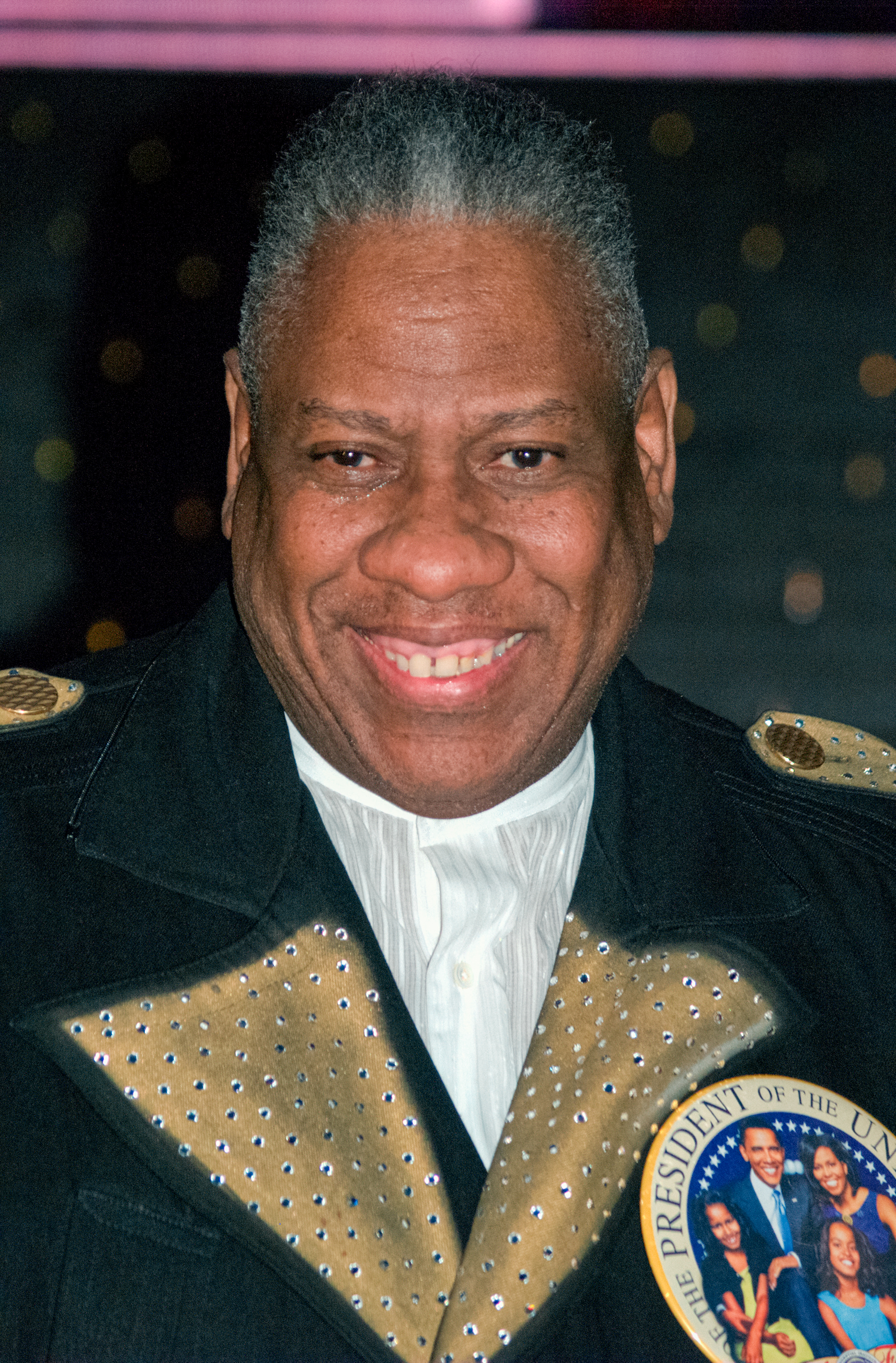
André Leon Talley in 2009

Ruth E. Carter, the first Black woman to win the Academy Award for Best Costume Design, stated that "Black Dandyism is a form of performance, identity, and individuality" which exists without a sense of gender. She also associated "dressing fine" with an act of rebellion and provocation. Playwright and actor Jeremy O. Harris called the Black dandy "the type of man who flaunts his elevated wares much to the awe and fright of many around him... a rewriter of narratives—the narratives carved into a society’s understanding about the communities from which the dandy has emerged."

Artsy named artists like Barkley L. Hendricks, Tyler Mitchell, Nick Cave, Cornelius Annor, Derek Fordjour, Bisa Butler, and Audrey Lyall as evocative of modern Black dandyism.

== Met Gala ==
The theme for the 2025 Met Gala was "Superfine: Tailoring Black Style", based around Black dandyism, and marks the first-ever Met Gala theme dedicated to Black designers. This theme is inspired by a spring 2025 exhibition of the same name, "Superfine: Tailoring Black Style", at the Costume Institute, which explores the history and influence of Black dandyism in the Western world. Precious Moloi-Motsepe had partnered with the Met Gala, collaborating with Vogue and the Anna Wintour Costume Center, on the exhibition.

The exhibition, curated by Monica L. Miller and Andrew Bolton, examined how clothing and style have shaped Black identities and the role of the Black dandy. Its 12 exhibition sections are "Ownership, Presence, Distinction, Disguise, Freedom, Champion, Respectability, Jook, Heritage, Beauty, Cool and Cosmopolitanism." Chairs and hosts of the event include Monáe, Colman Domingo, ASAP Rocky, LeBron James, Pharrell Williams, and Lewis Hamilton, among others. It also features curation from Miller, whose 2009 book, Slaves to Fashion: Black Dandyism and the Styling of Black Diasporic Identity, inspired the gala theme. The event raised $31 million, a record high in the gala's history.

The Met Gala's dress code was "Tailored for You", inviting attendees to interpret the theme and its focus on menswear.

== See also ==
- Pachuco – another example of how fashion can be a form of resistance, self-expression, and cultural pride for marginalized communities
