= Mexican-American women's fashion =

Mexican American women's fashion has greatly evolved across the decades as a form of cultural expression shaped by social, political, and historical conditions. These styles celebrate beauty and fashion, while also functioning as a form of resistance and self-expression. However, this evolution was not always well received by society; it was often seen as non-normative or un-American due to its provocation of gender roles, race, and national identity. This evolution began in the 1920s with the emergence of the Pelonas, followed by Pachucas in the 1940s, Chicanas in the 1970s, and Cholas in the 1990s each reflecting social and cultural situations of the time. These styles ultimately functioned as forms of political and cultural expression that challenged dominant ideas around race, gender, class, and respectability.

== Pelonas – 1920s ==
Las Pelonas, meaning "the short-haired/bald girls," is a style that emerged in the U.S-Mexico borderlands during the early 20th century and served as a form of rebellion against traditional gender roles and societal expectations. The name refers to the bobbed haircuts that these women had. This style, characterized by short haircuts, masculine clothing, and bold accessories, challenged the media's perception of femininity and empowered women to express themselves. By rejecting restrictive dress codes, Las Pelonas created a new standard for female fashion that celebrated individuality and self-expression. The media would often use the recognizability of the pelona image to perpetuate negative stereotypes. This led to violence in the streets directed towards las pelonas for their choice of fashion.

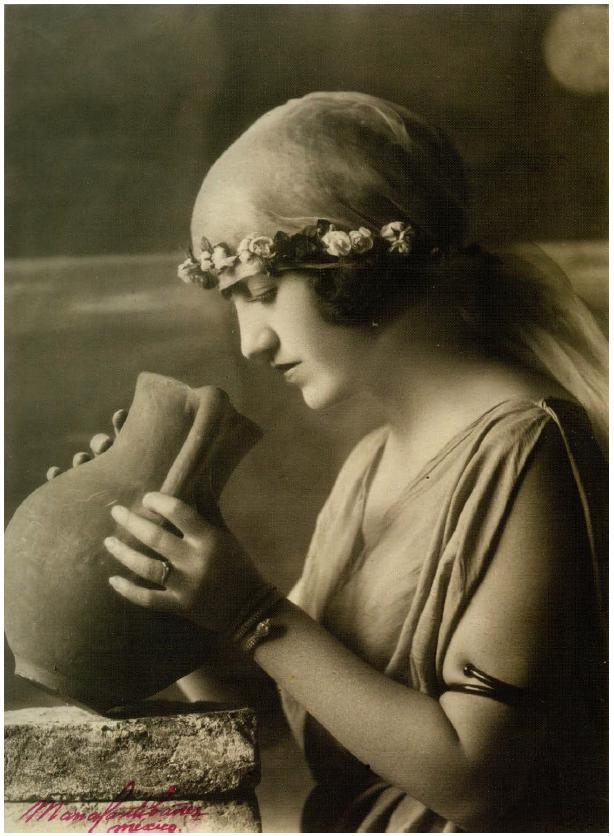
María Santibáñez, “sin título”

=== Etymology ===
In the 1920s, pelonas were 15-25-year-old women who were known for their adaptation of the American flapper. Popular American actresses appearing in Spanish-language media and American consumerism began to influence young Chicanas into a new Americanized style. This style is defined by short bobbed hair, scarlet lips, and short dresses, which conflicted with traditional expectations of Chicana women. Pelonas preferred an elegant masculine look suitable for sports, driving, and shopping. It allowed them to move more freely and comfortably than the restrictive corsets and long skirts of previous eras. This era also saw the widespread purchasing of manufactured products, which let women save time on sewing clothes for their family, and this created more time for leisure activities. This embracement of consumerism is a marker of the pelona identity, which upset conservatives who favored traditional ways of living. The bobbed haircut was heavily criticized, because it was seen as a threat to endangered indigenous culture and the femininity of Chicana women. The bold use of cosmetics were previously only commonly used by sex workers, which led to critics comparing their application to a painted pinata; however, makeup products were used in barrio beauty pageants where young women were supported by local organizations, like churches, labor unions, and newspapers, for emphasizing their physical appearance. Pelonas’ preferences for makeup, attire, and disposition were also criticized and seen as a rejection of obligatory feminine purity. The U.S–Mexico borderlands create unique cultural and social dynamics for Chicana women. Chicano social scientists have characterized this role as “the glue that keeps the Chicano family together” and “the guardians of traditional culture.”

=== Media depictions ===
Media depictions of pelonas’ style influenced how society viewed them. Newspapers would often mock pelonas in comic strips that depicted them as morally bankrupt, greedy, or dirty through the power of their image. Jose Posada created “Catrina Calaveras” in 1912 as a political satire image of wealthy Mexican elite. After his death, the metal print press for his work was recycled to create “El Pantheon de Las Pelonas” in 1924, which inspired Diego Rivera to start incorporating calaveras in his work; thus, using the pelona style to create the iconic images for Día de Los Muertos. The playful humor when depicting pelonas became bitter contempt. The media used to mock pelonas resulted in dehumanizing them into a few sexual signifiers. This dehumanization resulted in the 1924 summer incident in Mexico City where a group of male students attacked pelonas by throwing water on them and shaving their heads. This attack was done to express their distaste for the style and to chastise pelonas for their intrusion into public male-dominated spaces. Pelonas carved out a unique space for themselves that did not fit into any existing figures of femininity. The image was powerful enough to cross borders and, most influentially, it was available for those who are nonliterate. The style lost popularity in the 1930s depression and some people celebrated the ‘death’ of las pelonas as a sign of a return to tradition; however, thirty years later Pachucas would continue to challenge gender norms.

== Pachucas – 1940s ==
Pachucas were second generation Mexican Americans, characterized by their zoot suits and use of fashion to express their sexuality, individuality, class and race. Their efforts to claim public space through fashion was often met with criticism, especially during World War II when nationalism was high. Mexican American women were often excluded from categories such as "American," "lady," and "patriot," and Pachuca style represented another attempt to establish belonging in society while also staying true to their cultural identity. Their style included zoot suits made of oversized coats with padded shoulder, wide-legged trousers or fitted skirts, along with heavy makeup such as dark lipstick and bold eye makeup. Hairstyles often included high pompadours or bouffants, sometimes decorated with flowers or accessories. During this time, national unity was highly emphasized, unconventional styles more controversial. Their fashion highlighted visibility and individuality, often signaling status through their expensive pieces while simultaneously challenging standards of modesty and conformity. Zoot suit were often seen as non-normative and associated with masculine clothing, thus challenging dominant gender expectations. Because of this Pachucas we're commonly labeled as inappropriate and even queer, showing social discomfort towards women who do not conform to traditional femininity. Likewise, scholars state that Pachucas disrupted gender norms by combining exaggerated forms of femininity with pieces that would be considered masculine, creating a style that didn't fit into either category. Scholars also argue that Pachuca fashion became associated with criminality in the media, following the Zoot Suit Riots and the Sleepy Lagoon case, where Pachucas were often portrayed as rebellious and unpatriotic.

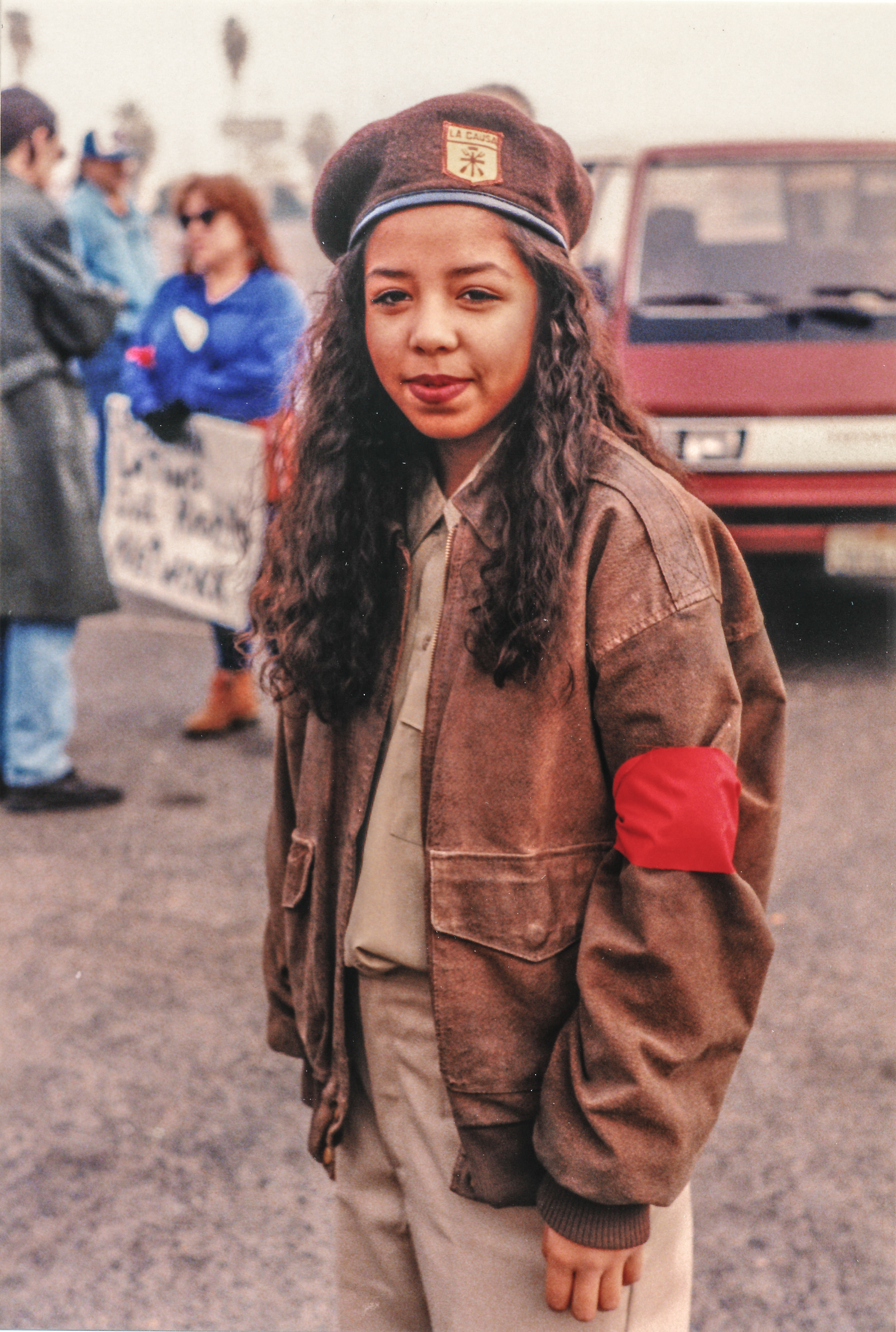
Brown Beret at a protest

== Chicanas – 1970s ==
Chicanas arose around the time of the Civil Rights Movement and the Women's Rights Movement. Their style reflected both mainstream influences and cultural identity, utilizing items like denim, fitted clothing, and modern fashion trends while also moving away from conservatism norms. This was significant period of time as Mexican American women increasingly used fashion as way to express identity, assert their presence, use their voice, and challenge social expectations. Chicanas were actively involved in political movements such as the Chicano Movement, Chicana feminism, and organizations like the Brown Berets, where fashion was combined with activism. Scholars have argued that Chicana fashion functioned as a form of political expression allowing them to challenge existing ideas of race, gender, and class. Many Chicanas also drew inspiration from earlier Pachuca styles, continuing the process of using self-expression and resistance through fashion. Similar to the Pachucas, these styles were seen as unconventional and deviant showing the same pattern of self-expression in Mexican American women being viewed negatively by the mainstream media.

== Cholas – 1990s ==
Chola style emerged as a combination of influences, including hip hop culture, gang culture, earlier Pachuca style, and broader social conditions. This style is characterized by oversized clothing such as flannel shirts, loose-fitting pants, dark lip liner, winged eyeliner, thin eyebrows, and styled hair. Additional aspects of the style included hoop earrings, acrylic nails, tattoos, and gold nameplate ot religious necklaces. Chola fashion represents a recognizable aesthetic that symbolized identity, community belonging, and shared cultural experiences. The style was often associated with negative stereotypes, though scholars argue the Chola style should be seen as a form of self-expression shaped by race, class, and gender instead of as an indicator of violence. These styles often prompt assumptions about involvement in criminal activity or hypersexuality, reflecting broader societal patterns where the aesthetics of working-class women of color is stigmatized. However, research shows that these perceptions are socially constructed through media representation and institutional bias. Despite these interpretations, Chola fashion continues to influence modern aesthetic and remains an important form of cultural expression. Scholars have also connected the stigmatization of Chola fashion to broader fears surrounding race, class, sexuality, and the "urban underclass", which is when aesthetics associated with working-class women of color is interpreted as signs of deviance or aggression.
