= Pachucas =

Female Mexican–American subculture

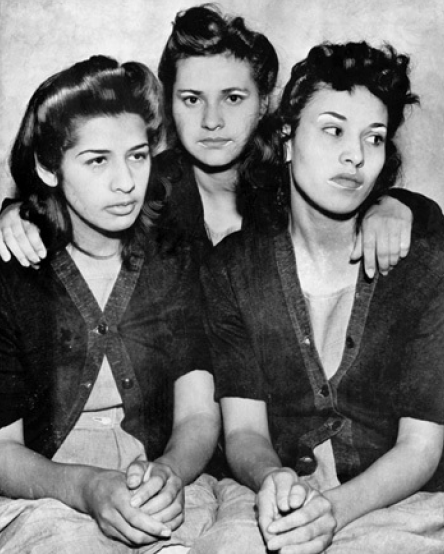
Dora Barrios, Frances Silva, and Lorena Encinas held in the Los Angeles County Jail during the 1943 Sleepy Lagoon trial

Pachucas (from 'pachuca', the female counterpart to the 'pachuco') were Mexican-American women who rebelled during World War II, also known as "cholitas", "slick chicks", and "lady zoot suiters". The zoot suits they wore were a symbol of rebellion due to the rationing of cloth for the war effort, and to some, wearing the longer and loose-fitting jackets and pants was seen as being unpatriotic.

The zoot suit was the most salient identifying feature of "pachuquismo", a Mexican-American youth subculture. This subculture emerged during a time of increased racism and the fight for Mexican-American rights and equality within American society. Both men and women wore the fingertip coats, but for women it became more than just a style. Pachuca gangs, like the Black Widows and Slick Chicks, with their black drape jackets, tight skirts, fishnet stockings and heavily emphasized make-up, were ridiculed in the press.

Participation in the movement was a way to openly challenge conventional notions of feminine beauty and sexuality, especially in Mexican culture.

== Zoot Suit Riots ==
Las Pachucas or 'cholitas' were the female counterpart to the male zoot suiter, or pachuco. Las Pachucas were involved in much of the violence surrounding the Zoot Suit Riots, often in documentation being seen throwing things and yelling at law enforcement. Las Pachucas were unique in relation to their pachuco counterpart because of their newfound sexual and cultural identity, within both their own Mexican-American communities and American society. Las Pachucas feminized the masculine style of dress by wearing, in addition to the coats, sheer blouses, shorter, pleated skirts, fishnet stockings or bobby socks, and platform heels or sandals. Their use of make-up and beauty products was another identifying feature, as they wore dark lipstick and used foam inserts called rats to lift their hair up into a high bouffant/up do. Most often sported plucked and thin eye brows. Las Pachucas became a figure for Mexican-American femininity and sexuality during the time of WWII and the zoot suit riots, due to their change in dress and use of make up that stood in stark contrast to previous conventional ideals within Mexican culture.

=== Background ===
For some, during the time of WWII the wearing of the 'pachuca' style was a statement to the communities of their identity; for others, it was a symbol of rebellion. The emergence of the coverage and documentation of Las Pachucas, as well as "the appearance of female pachucos coincided with a dramatic rise in the delinquency rates amongst girls aged between 12 and 20 years old" after the Sleepy Lagoon Case. During the case, Pachuca women were involved and like their pachuco counterparts were not given due process. During the time of increased discrimination against Mexican Americans and Mexican culture, this inclusion of Pachuca women complicates their potential status as "patriotic Americans". Pachuca women face both backlash from their own communities for their newly sexualized styles and contributions to the riots, but also the Anglo communities and they felt that pachuca women were "unfeminine," and could never conform to or exude Anglo standards of feminine beauty due to their involvement in the movement.

== Reactions ==
=== In the media ===
In the Los Angeles newspapers, las Pachucas were vilified as "incorrigible delinquents." Similarly, "La Opinion referred to them as "las malinches"– "traitors" to established Mexican codes of chaperoned feminine conduct." In general, the Pachucos were praised in their community for taking a stand against the Anglos, but the Pachucas were frequently criticized in media and in their community for being so open about their sexuality.

Amelia Venegas, a Mexican-American woman later considered a 'cholita', was arrested for disturbing the peace and carrying a concealed weapon after cursing at police officials. According to the press, "twenty-two-year-old, mother of a toddler and wife of a sailor, had incited violence by urging a gang of pachucos to attack sheriff's deputies in her East Los Angeles neighborhood." Additionally, newspapers reported that she "attempted to smuggle a pair of brass knuckles to "zoot suit hoodlums" to assist them in their street brawls with sailors." The Los Angeles Times featured a photograph of her baring teeth and shaking a threatening fist at the camera. The press deemed Venegas a "pachuco" girl, a label that then suggested gang affiliation.

=== In the community ===
Las Pachucas faced backlash from their own Mexican-American community. While some women admired and wore the style, creating their own identities within the American culture and feminist movements, others, like Patricia Adler, an Anglo female historian, saw them as dangerous and disruptive to the ideal Mexican-American womanhood, developing in comparison to Anglo feminism ideals. Adler commented that Pachucas "scandalized the adults of the Anglo and Mexican communities alike with their short, tight skirts, sheer blouses, and built-up hairdos", associating their attire with delinquency that rebelled against proper feminine behavior and definitions of Mexican femininity.

== History ==
Pachucas are a branch of Chicana History itself, with only the "boom" of Chicano/a studies being prevalent in the late 1960s and early 1970s. In the 1980s, according to Cordelia Candelaria, this history was not yet a "systemic, coherent field of inquiry and analysis." Further studies made by some of these Latina college graduates brings the role of Chicana women into more light as pivotal roles in Chicano/a History. Chicano/a professionals in the late 20th century began looking towards different forms and subcultures of Chicano/a studies, whether it was gender, labor, culture, or sexuality.

Many Chicano/a studies Scholars widely consider the Zoot Suit Riots of World War II as a significant starting point for Chicano/a history, as this was one of the first events that mainly contained Chicano people, on a national scale. Scholar Catherine Ramirez, author of many Chicano/a papers, emphasizes the importance of the World War II treatment and discrimination, particularly in the inner city, as the four major Los Angeles newspapers dubbed young Mexican-Americans, "unpatriotic."

During 1942, many Pachucas were considered some of the first female "delinquents" in the greater Los Angeles area. Pachucas wore the same zoot-suits that most Mexican-American men would wear; because of this, the women were considered by the Los Angeles population, an "integral part of element of gang menace allegedly plaguing city streets."

Regardless of the negative stigma, their influence can be felt even decades later, mainly in pop culture and communities that are still surviving. The culture of Pachucas/os was used as inspiration for many of the surviving cultures of today, which are now known as "cholos/as", with Margarita Cota-Cardenas even stating that "The pachucos can in some way be considered role models for today's exponents of la causa." In media and society, Pachucas are not seen as much as Pachucos, but in 2002 song titled, "El Bracero y La Pachuca", composed by Dueto Taxo and Mariachi Los Caporales del Norte, shed some light onto Pachucas in Chicano culture. This song, a mix of "proper" Spanish and Pachuca slang show a uncanny union between cultures, "educated" and "street educated." Catherine Ramirez delves further into this song by mentioning the swapping of gender stereotypes, particularly in Latino households.

== In art ==
Carmen Lomas Garza's Pachuca With a Razor Blade is a "portrait of teenagers getting dressed for a dance with one young woman concealing a razor blade in a barrette, no doubt to be hip and protected".

== In the Southwest ==
Early Pachucas/os were not recognized for their actions or their looks but rather their language. Their use of caló was the main signifier for them, as Cumming states that "early Pachuco identity was manifested in linguistic practice." Pachucas dressed the same as their peers, the main signifiers being tall hairstyles such as the "pompadour" or high rolls in which, much like the Pachucas of Los Angeles, they often hid knives. Unlike their later Los Angeles counterparts, Tucson Pachucas did not take to gang life other than simply being aggressive - as shown from their motto, 'no dejarse', which "describes a strategy of not allowing oneself to be treated unfairly or badly"- and hanging out in groups with their friends.
