= Zoot Suit Riots =

1943 anti-Latino race riot by US servicemen in Los Angeles

- Part of civil unrest during World War II
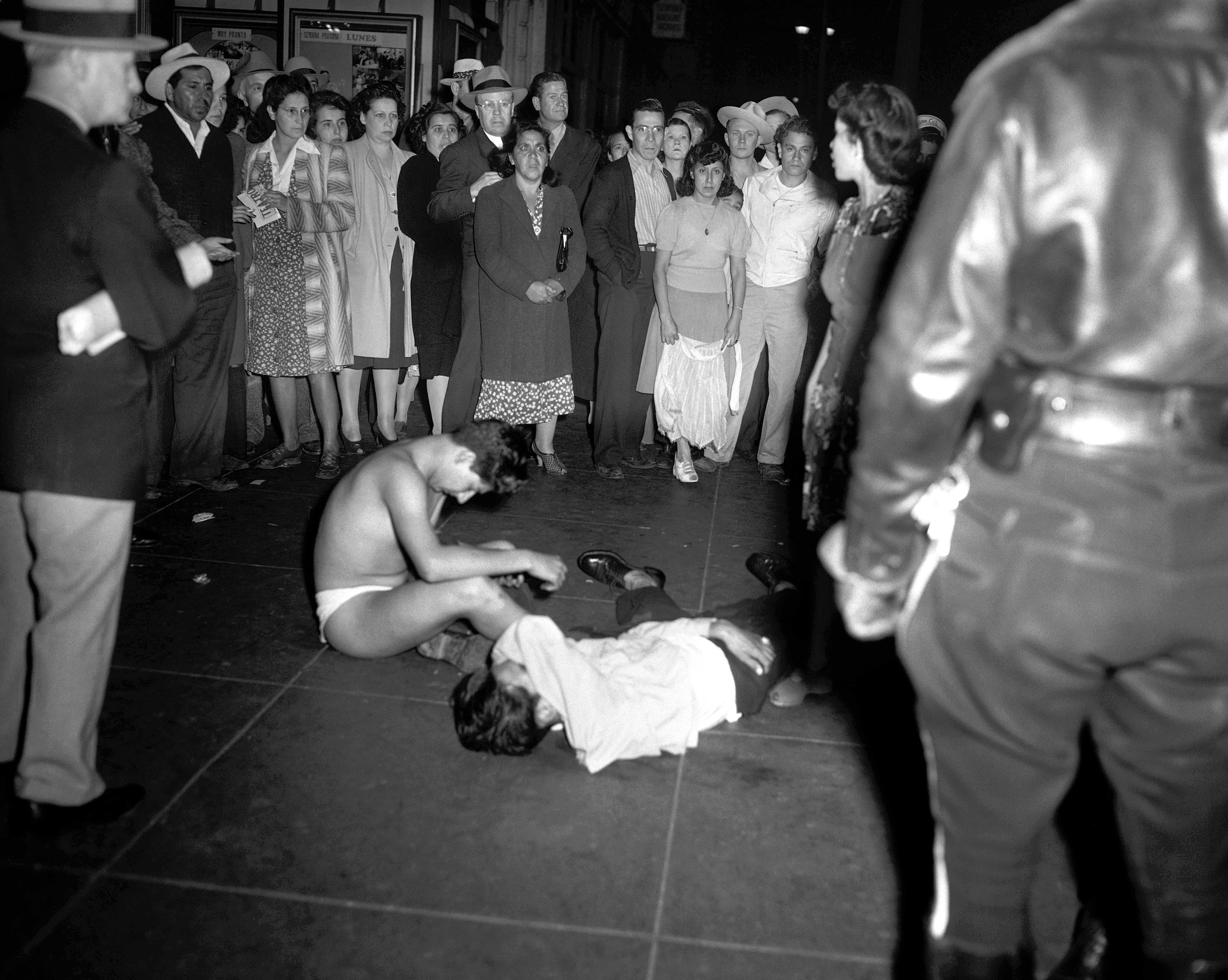
- Youths stripped and beaten by U.S. Navy sailors
- Location: Los Angeles, California, United States
- Date: June 3–8, 1943
- Target: Mexican American youths and other zoot suit wearers (mostly Filipino, black and other ethnic minorities)
- Injuries: 150+
- Victims: 500+ arrested
- Perpetrators: American servicemen, police officers and white civilians
- Motive: Racism, removal of zoot suits and "hoodlums"

The Zoot Suit Riots were disturbances that took place June 3–8, 1943, in Los Angeles, California, United States, involving American servicemen stationed in Southern California and young Latino and Mexican American city residents. Los Angeles was one of the dozen wartime industrial cities where race-related riots occurred during the summer of 1943, along with Mobile, Alabama; Beaumont, Texas; Detroit, Michigan; and New York City.

American servicemen and White Angelenos attacked and stripped youths who wore zoot suits, ostensibly because they considered the outfits, which were made from large amounts of fabric, to be unpatriotic during World War II. Rationing of fabrics and certain foods was required at the time for the war effort. While most of the white mobs targeted Mexican American youth, they also attacked African American and Filipino American young adults and children.

The Zoot Suit Riots followed the Sleepy Lagoon murder trial, where members of a Mexican American gang were convicted of murdering a civilian man, José Díaz, in a commercial area near Los Angeles (though the convictions were ultimately overturned).

Similar violence against Latinos happened in Chicago, San Diego, Oakland, Evansville, Philadelphia, and New York City as well. The defiance of zoot suiters became inspirational for Chicanos during the Chicano Movement.

== Background ==
=== Mexicans in Los Angeles ===
California was a part of Mexico for 27 years, and part of the Viceroyalty of New Spain for centuries, before becoming part of the United States following the Mexican–American War. Because of this history, there was a large Latino population in California long before its establishment as a US state. During the early 20th century, many Mexicans immigrated for work to US border states that needed workers, such as Texas, Arizona, and California. They were recruited by farmers for work on the large farms and also worked in those states in non-agricultural jobs.

During the Great Depression, in the early 1930s, the United States deported between 500,000 and 2 million people of Mexican descent (including the expulsion of up to 1.2 million children who were U.S. citizens but accompanied their parents back to Mexico) to Mexico (see Mexican Repatriation). By the late 1930s, about three million Mexican Americans resided in the United States. Los Angeles had the highest concentration of ethnic Mexicans outside Mexico.

Job discrimination in Los Angeles forced minorities to work for below poverty level wages. The Los Angeles newspapers described Mexicans with racially inflammatory propaganda, suggesting a problem with juvenile delinquency. These factors caused much racial tension between Mexican immigrants, those of Mexican descent, and European Americans.

During this time, Los Angeles was undergoing an expansion, which caused disruptions in communal sites, family sites, and family patterns of social interactions due to poor city planning. One major decision was to put a million-dollar Naval training school for the Naval Reserve Armory in the Chavez Ravine, a primarily working-class and immigrant area for Mexican-Americans. As young Mexican-American men from the neighborhood grew agitated and began a campaign of harassment, intimidation, and resistance a year prior to the riots, the Chavez Ravine area would later be a hot spot for encounters between the zoot suiters and sailors.

Lalo Guerrero became known as the father of Chicano music, as young people adopted music, language, and dress of their own. Young men wore zoot suits—a flamboyant long jacket with baggy pegged pants, sometimes accessorized with a pork pie hat, a long watch chain, and thick-soled shoes. They called themselves pachucos. In the early 1940s, arrests of Mexican-American youths and negative stories in the Los Angeles Times fueled a perception that these pachuco gangs were delinquents who were a threat to the broader community.

In the summer of 1942, the Sleepy Lagoon murder case made national news. Nine teenage members of the 38th Street Gang were accused of murdering a civilian man named José Díaz in an abandoned quarry pit. The nine defendants were convicted at trial and sentenced to long prison terms. Eduardo Obregón Pagán wrote:

Many Angelenos saw the death of José Díaz as a tragedy that resulted from a larger pattern of lawlessness and rebellion among Mexican American youths, discerned through their self-conscious fashioning of difference, and increasingly called for stronger measures to crack down on juvenile delinquency.

The convictions of the nine young men were ultimately overturned, but the case generated much animosity within the United States toward Mexican Americans. The police and press characterized all Mexican youths as "pachuco hoodlums and baby gangsters".

=== World War II ===
With the entry of the United States into World War II in December 1941 following the Japanese attack on Pearl Harbor, the nation had to deal with the restrictions of rationing and the prospects of conscription. In March 1942, the War Production Board (WPB) regulated the manufacture of men's suits and all clothing that contained wool. To achieve a 26% cut-back in the use of fabrics, the WPB issued regulations for the manufacture of what Esquire magazine called, "streamlined suits by Uncle Sam". The regulations effectively forbade the manufacture of the wide-cut zoot suits and full women's skirts or dresses. Most legitimate tailoring companies ceased to manufacture or advertise any suits that fell outside the War Production Board's guidelines. But the demand for zoot suits did not decline; a network of bootleg tailors based in Los Angeles and New York City continued to produce the garments. Youths also continued to wear clothes which they already owned.

Meanwhile, American soldiers, sailors, and Marines from across the country travelled to Los Angeles in large numbers as part of the war effort; they were given leave while awaiting to be shipped out to the Pacific theater. Servicemen and zoot suiters in Los Angeles were both immediately identifiable by their dress. Some servicemen and others in the community felt that the continued wearing of zoot suits represented the youths' public flouting of rationing regulations. Officials began to cast wearing of zoot suits in moral terms and associated it with the commission of petty crime, violence and the snubbing of national wartime rules. In 1943, many servicemen resented the sight of young Latinos wearing zoot suits after clothing restrictions had been published, especially as most came from areas of the country with little experience or knowledge of Mexican-American culture. Although Mexican-Americans were overrepresented in the armed forces, they were not common or respected enough to defuse these tensions.

One of the first conflicts between the sailors and the zoot suiters was in August 1942, near Chinatown. The sailors who trained in the Chavez Ravine went to Chinatown on leave. A sailor and his girlfriend were walking when four zoot suiters blocked the sidewalk in front of them. The zoot suiters refused to let them pass and pushed the sailor into the street. The young zoot-suiter and the sailor stood their ground in silence until finally, the sailor backed away.

=== Zoot suits ===
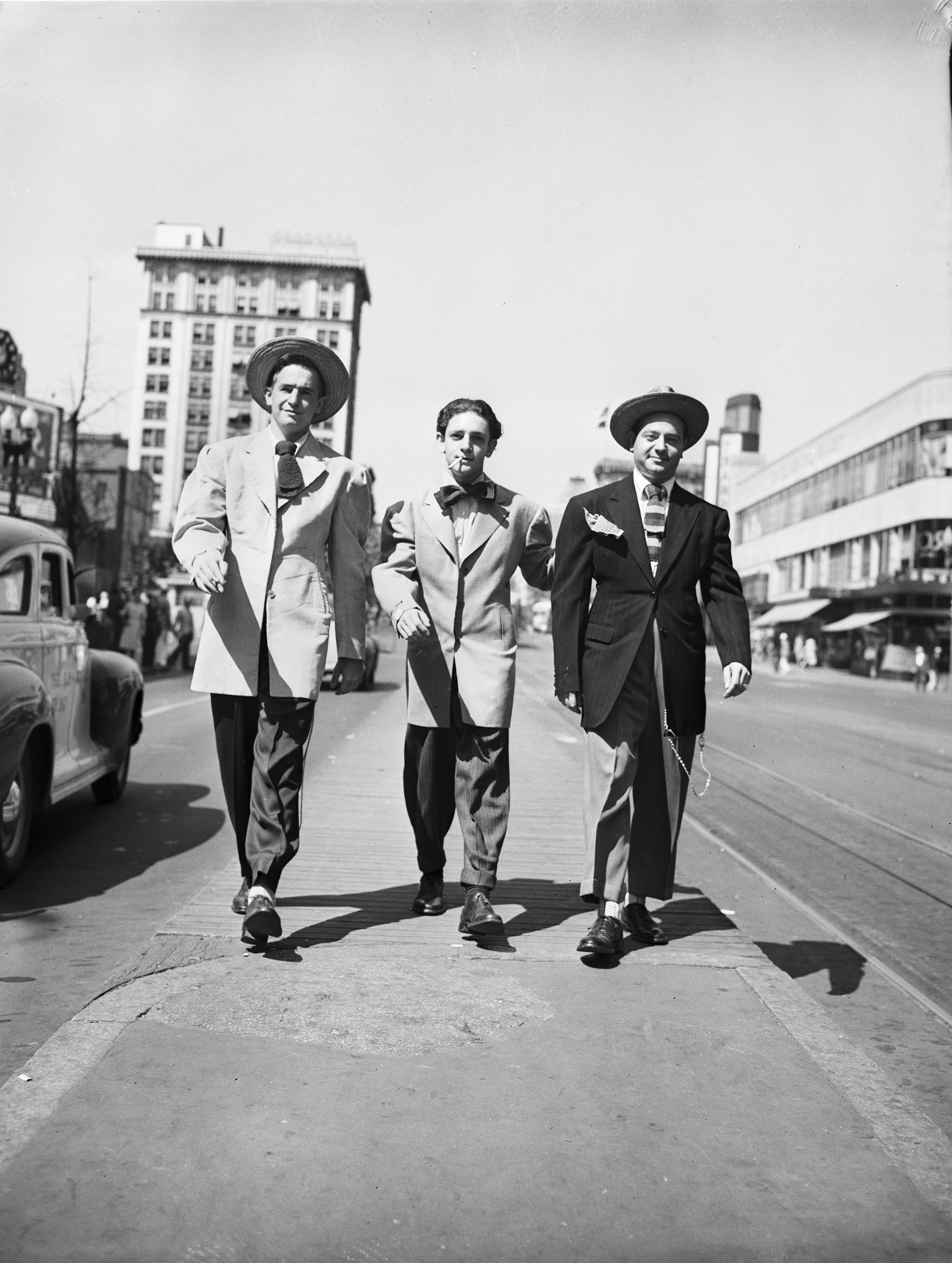
This photograph of three men sporting variations on the zoot suit was taken by Oliver F. Atkins.

Zoot suit fashion found its origins in the urban black scene during the 1940s. This style of clothing cultivated a sense of racial pride and significance; however, the fashion statement soon made its way into the wardrobes of young Southern Californian Mexican Americans, Italians and Filipinos, who became the quintessential wearers of the zoot suit. The transfer and sharing of the zoot suit fashion indicated a growing influence of African American popular culture on young Mexican American, Italian American and Filipino Americans. Additionally, "analysis of the Los Angeles zoot-suit riot and journalists' and politicians' in and the outfit's connections with race relations, slang, jazz music and dance permit an understanding of the politics and social significance of what is trivial in itself -- popular culture and its attendant styles".

The zoot suit was originally a statement about creating a new wave of music and dress, but it also held significant political meaning. The flamboyant and colorful material indicated a desire to express oneself against the boring and somber slum lifestyle. The zoot suit provided young African American and Mexican youth a sense of individualistic identity within their cultures and society as they discovered "highly charged emotional and symbolic meaning" through the movement, music, and dress.

The zoot suit typically included bright-colored fabric, long suit coats that often reached the knees, wide shoulders, and gathered or tapered pants. The arm and ankle areas were often much tighter than the rest of the fabric, giving the whole look a triangular shape.

Often the suit was paired with accessories such as chains and leather-soled shoes, which were typically worn to exaggerate and prove a point of rebellion standing against the wealth and status that many of these youth were unable to access due to their economic and racial identities.

=== Pachucas ===
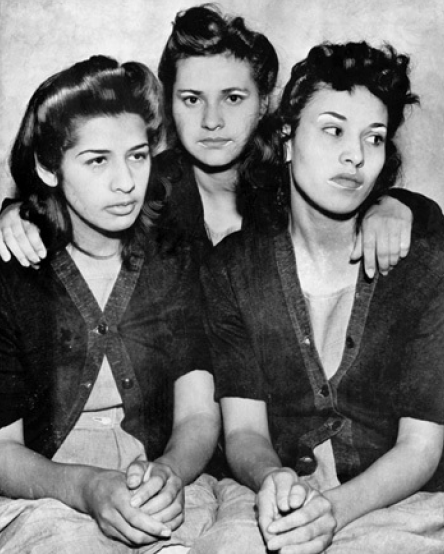
Three young Pachuca women held in the Los Angeles County Jail during the 1943 Sleepy Lagoon trial.

The urban, Mexican-American youth often called themselves "pachucos". The female parallels were called "pachucas" and wore tight sweaters and relatively full, flared skirts, often paired with high hair-dos, large earrings, and heavy makeup. Many young Mexican-American women who were not pachucas avoided these clothing styles and hairstyles in order to avoid being seen as troublemakers by white people. Some women even reported that they had heard of pachucas hiding knives in their hair.

Pachucas formed their own gangs, joined the male pachuco gangs, and carried weapons. This behavior was often said to have been a divergence from the expected feminine beauty and manners of the middle-class. Often, for parents of Mexican-American girls, the pachucas "embodied not only a dissident femininity but a threatening, distinctly American identity as well". For some young women, the characteristics of the style promoted a sense of social mobility and "cultural hybridity" that was expressed through "increased interracial/ethnic relations, bilingualism, and pachuco slang".

Pachucas were less referred to in the media, partly because they threatened the gender and sexuality norms that existed at the time. When acknowledged, they were regarded mainly as secondary members to the male gang members. Many scholars exclude the pachuca narrative in major events in the Chicano movement. Events like the Sleepy Lagoon incident of 1942 and Zoot Suit Riots of 1943 have been described as "a boyish fight over a pretty girl" and a brawl involving "homeboys". However, records show that many women also participated in these events and had important roles in shaping their outcomes. In the Sleepy Lagoon incident, both men and women were attacked by a group of youths that later court documents referred to as the "Downey Boys". The pachucos and pachucas left Sleepy Lagoon after the attack, heading to the 38th Street neighborhood to gather reinforcements. They returned to Sleepy Lagoon to find that the Downey Boys had departed, and then headed to a party at the Williams Ranch where a fight broke out upon their arrival. Claims have asserted that there were women screaming and yelling as the fighting ensued.

Continuing into the end of World War II, Mexican-American women were at the center of much conflict between Anglo-American servicemen and Mexican American youths. In the weeks before the riots, servicemen reported that pachucos had been harassing, molesting, raping, and insulting their wives, girlfriends, and relatives. One local Los Angeles newspaper included a story of two young women who had allegedly been abducted in downtown and raped in a "zoot suit orgy". Many of these reports began building up and was one of the major instigators of the coming riots, as servicemen had declared that they will take matters into their own hands since the Los Angeles Police Department (LAPD) had supposedly done nothing to stop the attacks from pachucos on their women. On the contrary, Horace R. Cayton, a writer for the Pittsburgh Courier, "attributed the riots to non-Mexican servicemen, who he claimed envied Mexican American male zooters and desired the 'pretty brown creatures' with whom they consorted". However, the press was dominated by the stories which often claimed that "loose ... girls of the Los Angeles Mexican quarter" were responsible for taking advantage of unaware sailors who had money.

== Riots ==
=== Attacks begin ===
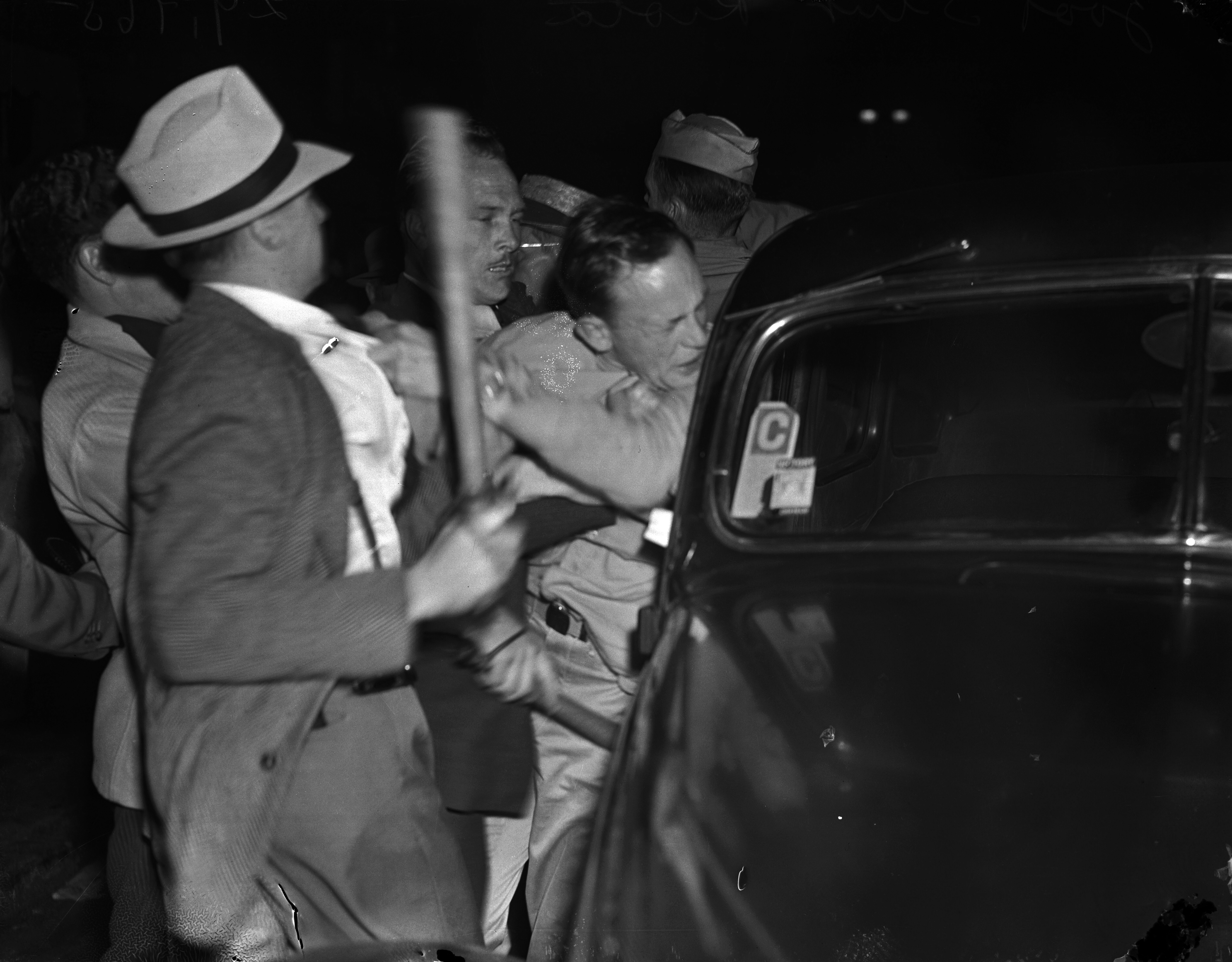
A man is attacked during the riots.

On the night of June 3, 1943, about eleven sailors got off a bus and started walking along Main Street in Downtown Los Angeles. Encountering a group of young Mexican Americans in zoot suits, they got into an argument which resulted in Seaman Second Class Joe Dacy Coleman being knocked unconscious with a broken jaw. The sailors later told the LAPD that they were jumped and beaten by this gang, while the zoot suiters claimed the altercation was started by the sailors. The LAPD responded to the incident, including many off-duty officers who identified as the Vengeance Squad. The officers went to the scene "seeking to clean up Main Street from what they viewed as the loathsome influence of pachuco gangs".

The next day, 200 sailors got a convoy of about 20 taxicabs and headed for East Los Angeles, the center of Mexican-American settlement. The sailors spotted a group of young zoot suiters and assaulted them with clubs. They stripped the boys of the zoot suits and burned the tattered clothes in a pile. They attacked and stripped everyone they came across who were wearing zoot suits. Media coverage of the incidents then started to spread, inducing more people to join in the mayhem.

=== Attacks spread ===
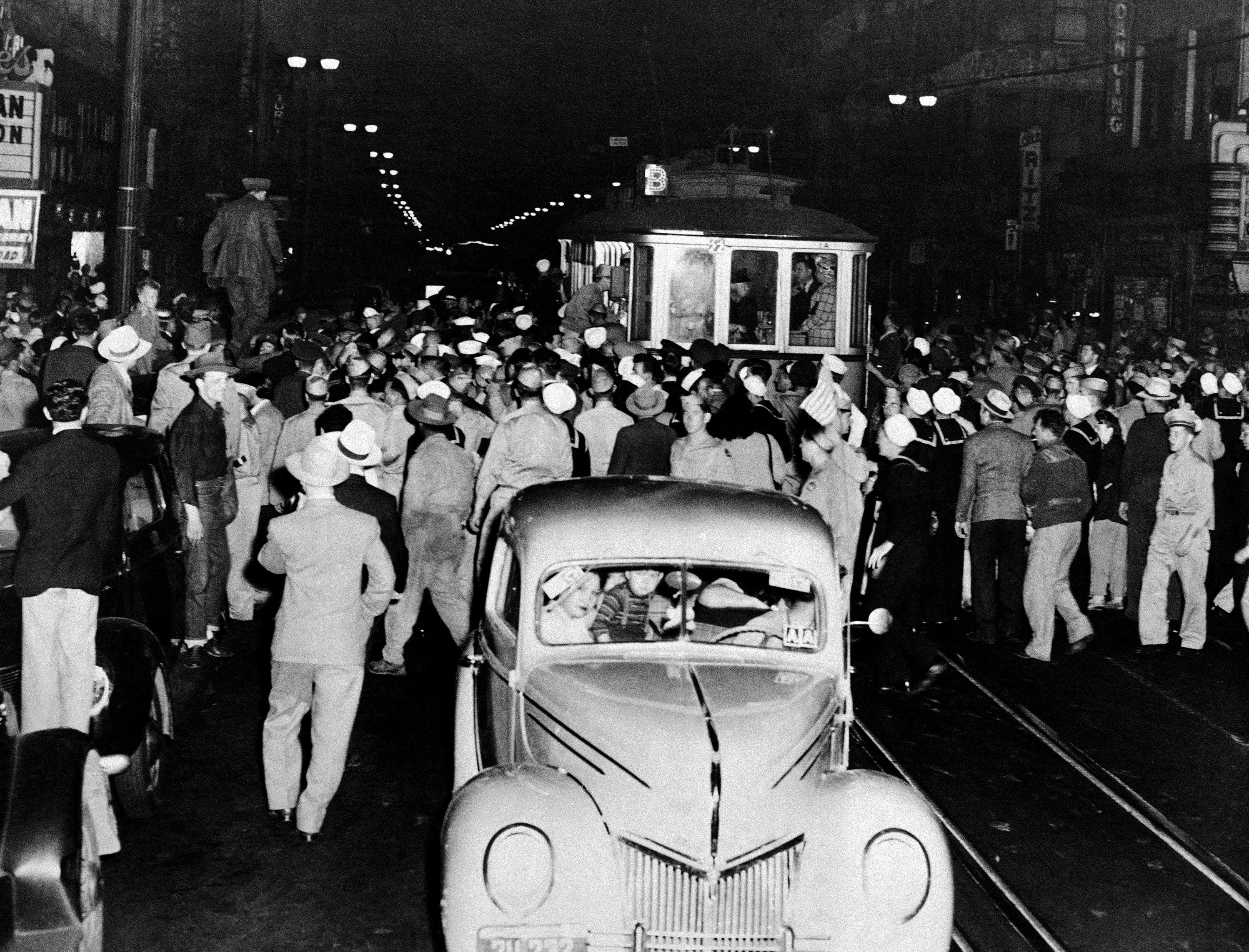
A photograph of the riot on June 7th

During the next few days, thousands of servicemen and residents joined the attacks, marching abreast down streets, entering bars and movie houses, and assaulting any young Mexican American males they encountered. In one incident, sailors dragged two zoot suiters on-stage as a film was being screened, stripped them in front of the audience, and then urinated on their suits. Although police accompanied the rioters, they had orders not to arrest any, and some of them joined in the rioting. After several days, more than 150 people had been injured, and the police had arrested more than 500 Mexican American civilians on charges ranging from "rioting" to "vagrancy".

A witness to the attacks, journalist Carey McWilliams wrote,

Marching through the streets of downtown Los Angeles, a mob of several thousand soldiers, sailors, and civilians, proceeded to beat up every zoot suiter they could find. Pushing its way into the important motion picture theaters, the mob ordered the management to turn on the house lights and then ran up and down the aisles dragging Mexicans out of their seats. Streetcars were halted while Mexicans, and some Filipinos and Negroes, were jerked from their seats, pushed into the streets and beaten with a sadistic frenzy.

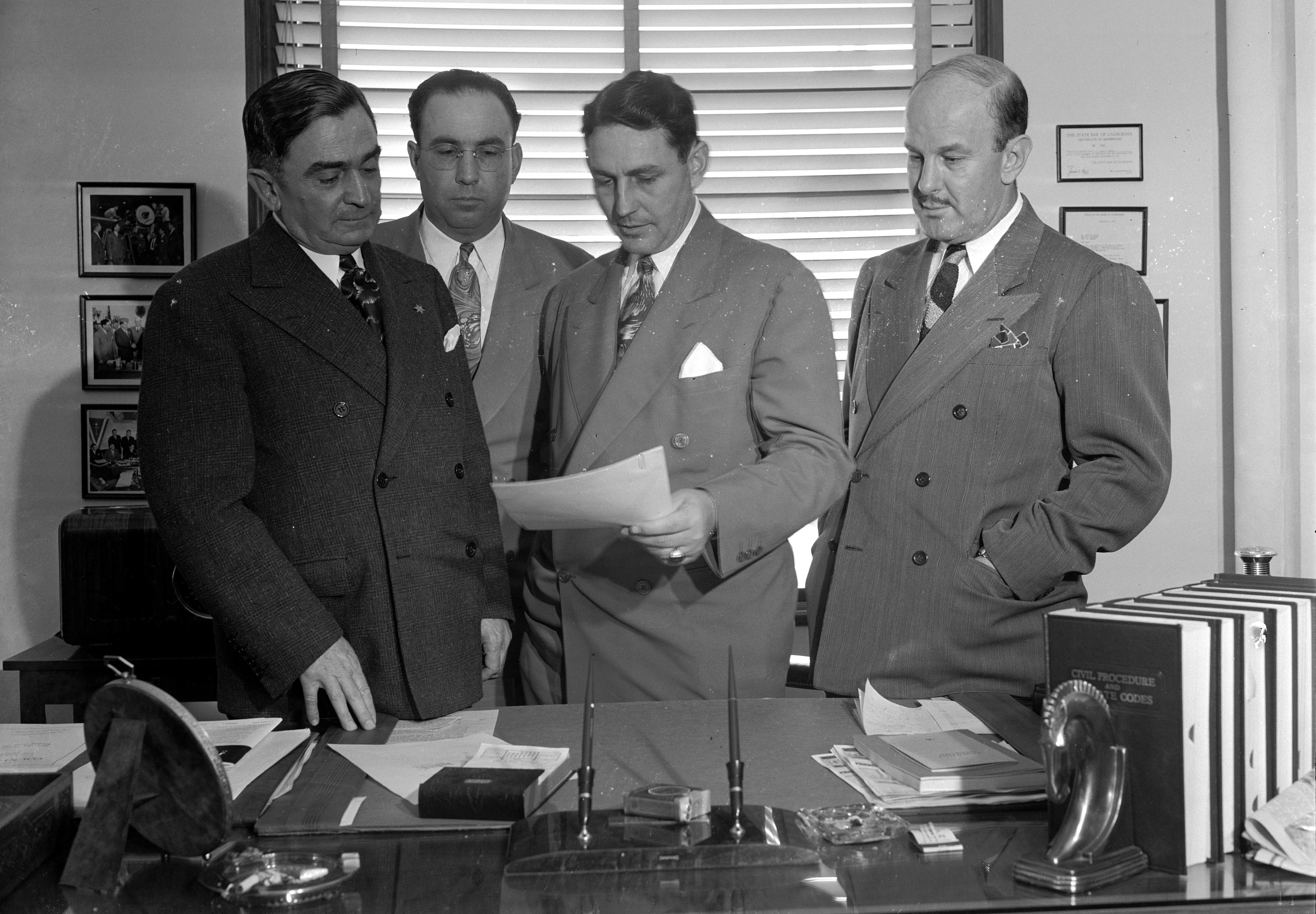
"Authorities meet to discuss the Zoot Suit Riots" (photo: Los Angeles Daily News)

The local press lauded the attacks, describing them as having a "cleansing effect" to rid Los Angeles of "miscreants" and "hoodlums". As the riots progressed, the media reported the arrest of Amelia Venegas, a female zoot suiter charged with carrying a brass knuckleduster. While the revelation of female pachucos' (pachucas) involvement in the riots led to frequent coverage of the activities of female pachuca gangs, the media suppressed any mention of the white mobs that were also involved.

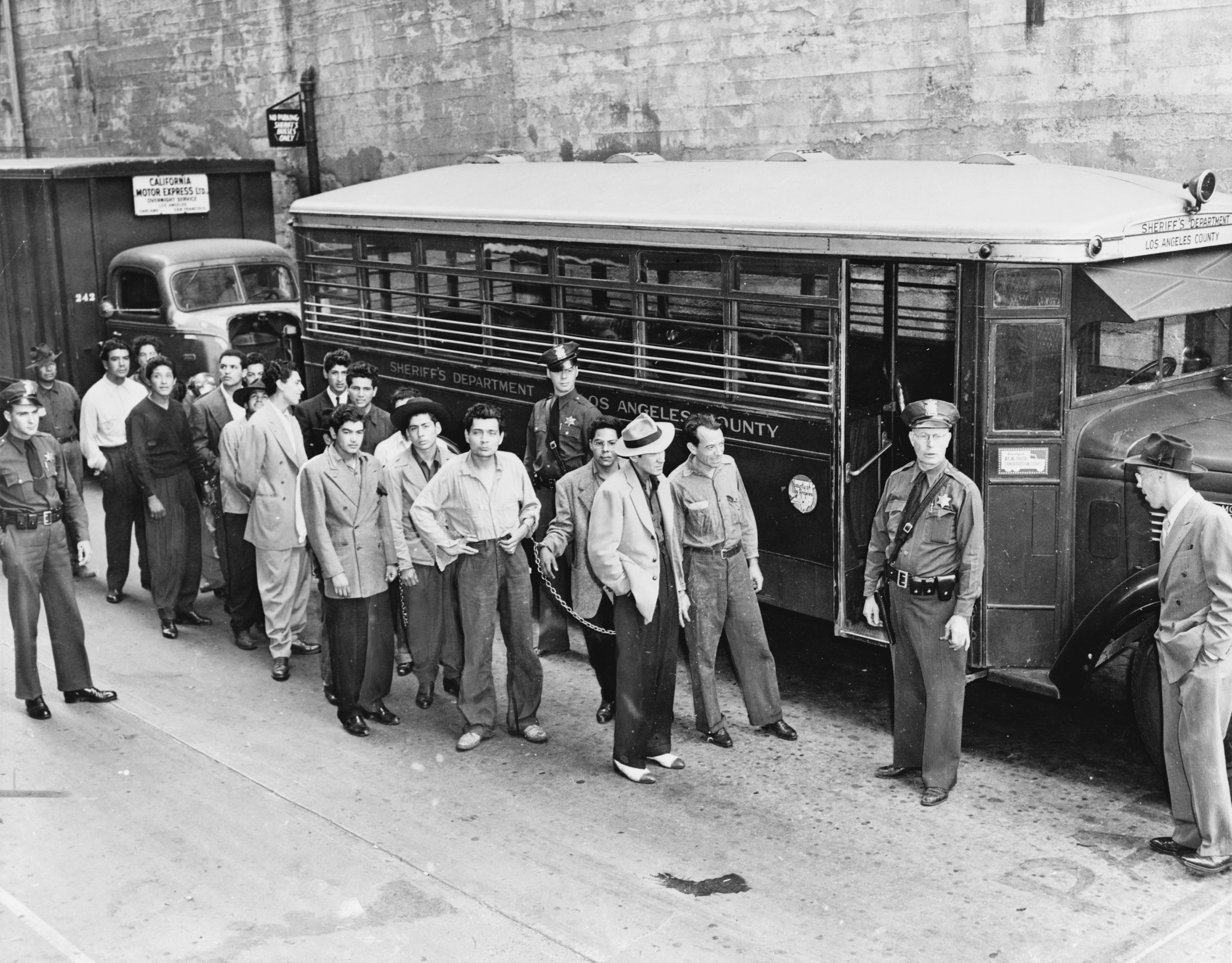
No soldiers were arrested as a result of the beatings. Many Mexican American youth, instead, were arrested after being attacked by the soldiers.

The Los Angeles City Council approved a resolution criminalizing the wearing of "zoot suits with reat [sic] pleats within the city limits of LA" with the expectation that Mayor Fletcher Bowron would sign it into law. Councilman Norris Nelson had stated, "The zoot suit has become a badge of hoodlumism." No ordinance was approved by the City Council or signed into law by the Mayor, but the council encouraged the WPB to take steps "to curb illegal production of men's clothing in violation of WPB limitation orders".

While the mobs had first targeted only pachucos, they also attacked African Americans in zoot suits who lived in the Central Avenue corridor area. The Navy and Marine Corps command staffs intervened on June 8, 1943, to reduce the attacks, confining sailors and Marines to barracks and ordering that Los Angeles be declared off-limits to all military personnel; this was enforced by Navy Shore Patrol personnel. Their official position was that their men were acting in self-defense.

== Reactions ==
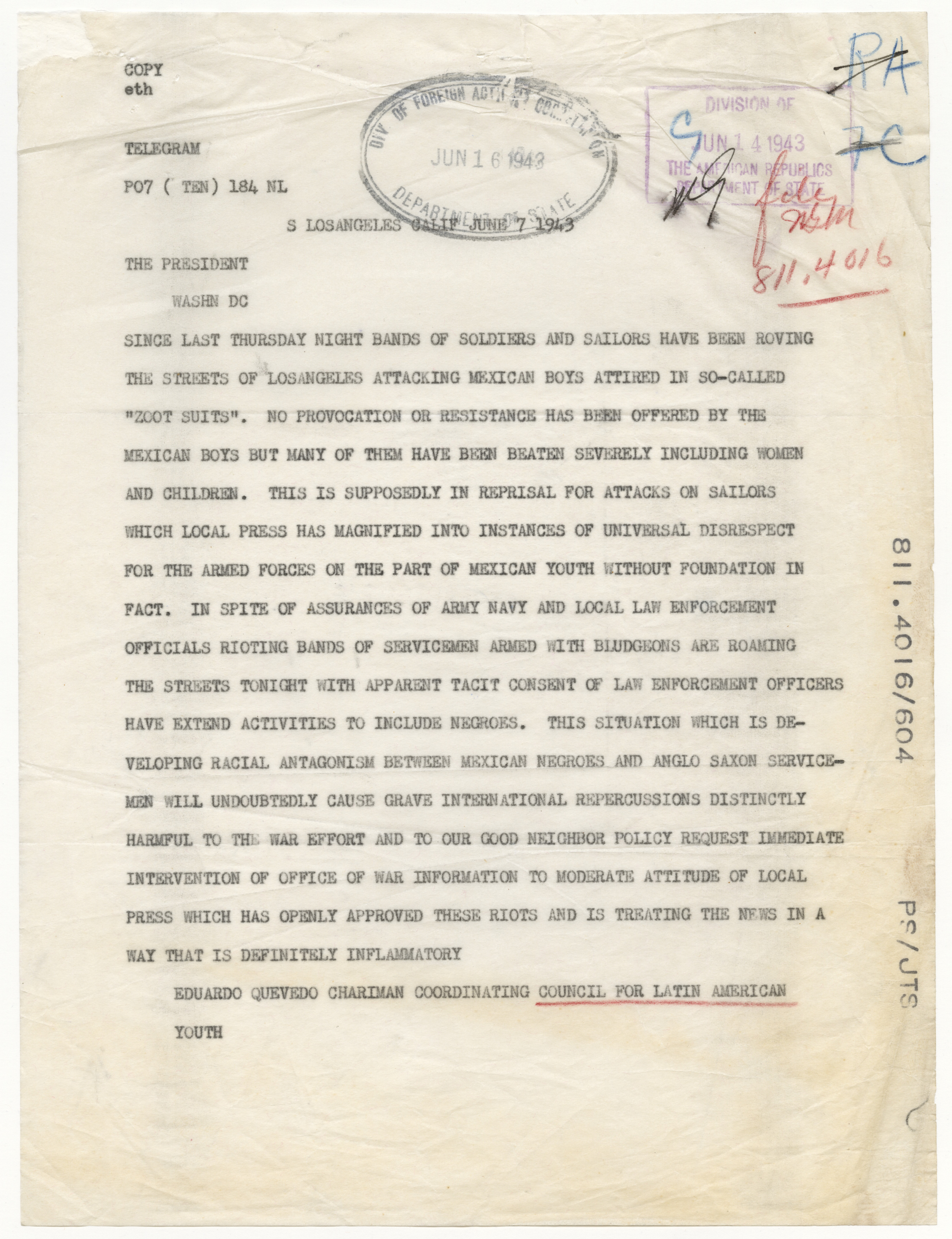
The Coordinating Council for Latin American Youth sent this telegram to President Franklin Roosevelt urging his attention to the riots in Los Angeles. National Archives, General Records of the Department of State

As the riots subsided, the most urgent concern of officials was relations with Mexico, as the economy of Southern California relied on the importation of cheap Mexican labor to assist in the harvesting of California crops. After the Mexican Embassy lodged a formal protest with the State Department, Governor Earl Warren of California ordered the creation of the McGucken Committee (headed by Los Angeles bishop Joseph McGucken) to investigate and determine the cause of the riots. In 1943, the committee issued its report; it determined racism to be a central cause of the riots, further stating that it was "an aggravating practice (of the media) to link the phrase zoot suit with the report of a crime". The governor appointed the Peace Officers Committee on Civil Disturbances, chaired by Robert W. Kenny, president of the National Lawyers Guild to make recommendations to the police. Human relations committees were appointed, and police departments were required to train their officers to treat all citizens equally. Mayor Fletcher Bowron downplayed the role racial prejudice played in the riots and blamed Mexican youth gangs. He labeled "juvenile delinquents" as the cause of the riots, insisting that "race was not a factor".

On June 16, 1943, a week after the riots, First Lady Eleanor Roosevelt commented on the riots in her newspaper column. "The question goes deeper than just suits. It is a racial protest. I have been worried for a long time about the Mexican racial situation. It is a problem with roots going a long way back, and we do not always face these problems as we should." The Los Angeles Times published an editorial the next day expressing outrage: it accused Mrs. Roosevelt of having communist leanings and stirring "race discord".

On June 21, 1943, the State Un-American Activities Committee, under state senator Jack Tenney, arrived in Los Angeles with orders to "determine whether the present Zoot Suit Riots were sponsored by Nazi agencies attempting to spread disunity between the United States and Latin-American countries". Although Tenney claimed he had evidence the riots were "[A]xis-sponsored", no evidence was ever presented to support this claim. Japanese propaganda broadcasts accused the U.S. government of ignoring the brutality of U.S. Marines toward Mexicans. In late 1944, ignoring the findings of the McGucken committee and the unanimous reversal of the convictions by the appeals court in the Sleepy Lagoon case on October 4, the Tenney Committee announced that the National Lawyers Guild was an "effective communist front".

Later scholars generally characterize the Zoot Suit riots as a "pogrom against the Mexican American community". Many post-war civil rights activists and authors, such as Luis Valdez, Ralph Ellison, and Richard Wright, have said they were inspired by the Zoot Suit Riots. Cesar Chavez and Malcolm X were both zoot suiters as young men who later became political activists.

On June 9, 2023, roughly 80 years after the attacks, the Los Angeles City Council publicly condemned the Zoot Suit riots and apologized for its role in contributing to it.

== See also ==
- Battle of Brisbane, Australia, 1942
- Townsville mutiny, Australia
- Battle of Manners Street in Wellington, New Zealand, 1943
- Battle of Bamber Bridge, England, 1943
- 1942 Phoenix Thanksgiving Day riot
- Freeman Field mutiny
- History of Mexican Americans in Los Angeles
- List of incidents of civil unrest in the United States
- National Synarchist Union, a political party which some have attempted to link to the unrest.
