= Pachuco =

Anti-assimilationist Chicano counterculture

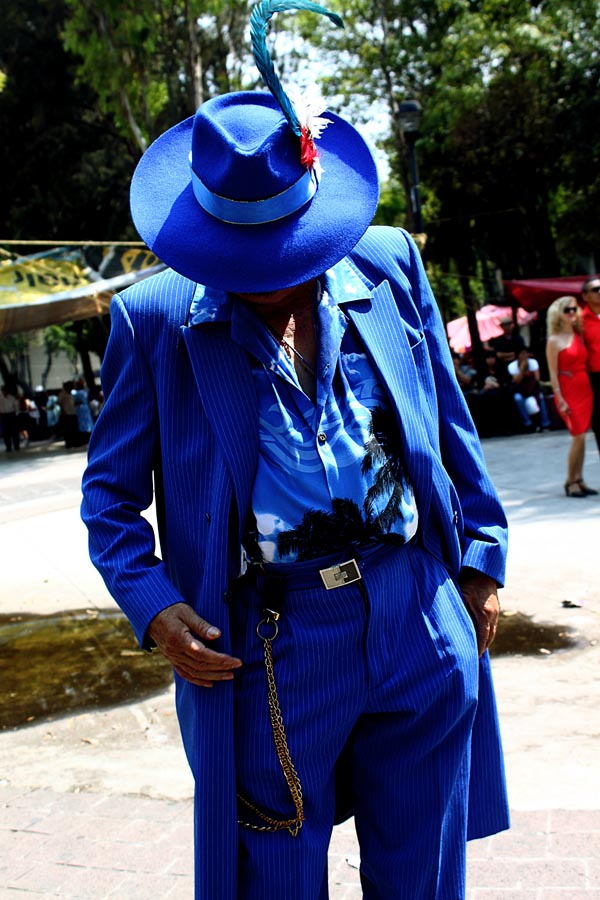
Pachuco culture is associated with the zoot suit and the idea of making flamboyant appearances in public.

Pachucos are male members of a counterculture that emerged in El Paso, Texas, in the late 1930s. Pachucos are associated with zoot suit fashion, jump blues, jazz and swing music, a distinct dialect known as caló, and self-empowerment in rejecting assimilation into Anglo-American society. The pachuco counterculture flourished among Chicano boys and men in the 1940s as a symbol of rebellion, especially in Los Angeles. It spread to women who became known as pachucas and were perceived as unruly, masculine, and un-American.

Some pachucos adopted strong attitudes of social defiance, engaging in behavior seen as deviant by white/Anglo-American society, such as marijuana smoking, gang activity, and a turbulent night life. Although concentrated among a relatively small group of Mexican Americans, the pachuco counterculture became iconic among Chicanos and a predecessor of the cholo subculture that emerged among Chicano youth in the 1980s.

Pachucos subculture began from the influence of African American Hepcat subculture. It may have some roots in Pachuca, Hidalgo, Mexico, where loose-fitting clothing was popular among men. It later spread throughout the Southwest into Los Angeles, where it developed further. In the border areas of California and Texas, a distinct youth culture known as pachuquismo developed in the 1940s and has been credited as an influence to Chicanismo. In LA, Chicano zoot suiters developed their own cultural identity, "with their hair done in big pompadours, and 'draped' in tailor-made suits ... They spoke caló, their own language, a cool jive of half-English, half-Spanish rhythms ... Out of the zoot-suiter experience came lowrider cars and culture, clothes, music, tag names, and, again, its own graffiti language."

Pachucos were perceived as alien to both Mexican and Anglo-American culture—distinctly Chicano figures. In Mexico, the pachuco was understood "as a caricature of the American", while in the U.S. he was perceived as "proof of Mexican degeneracy." Mexican critics such as Octavio Paz denounced the pachuco as a man who had "lost his whole inheritance: language, religion, customs, belief." In response, Chicanos heavily criticized Paz and embraced the oppositional position of the pachuco as an embodied representation of resistance to Anglo-American cultural hegemony. To Chicanos, the pachuco had acquired and emanated self-empowerment and agency through a "stylized power" of rebellious resistance and spectacular excess.

== Etymology ==
The origin of the word "pachuco" is uncertain, but one theory connects it to the city of El Paso, Texas, which was sometimes referred to as "Chuco Town" or "El Chuco". People migrating to El Paso from Ciudad Juarez would say, in Spanish, that they were going "pa' El Chuco". Some say "pa El Chuco" comes from the words Shoe Co., a shoe company that operated in El Paso in the 1940s during the war. The majority of Mexican migrants crossed the border to work for this company. The term "pa El Chuco" was used when Mexican immigrants headed to El Paso looking for a job. To get across the border the migrants had to dress well. These migrants became known as pachucos.

"Pachuco" may also have derived from the city of Pachuca, Hidalgo, Mexico, as most Mexican migration to the U.S. came from the Central Plateau region, where Hidalgo is.

Connections have also been found between "Pachucos" and mixed civilians who lived near the Mexico–U.S. border at the turn of the century, and between "Pachucos" and the poor soldiers who fought in the Mexican Revolution in Pancho Villa's armies.

== Style ==
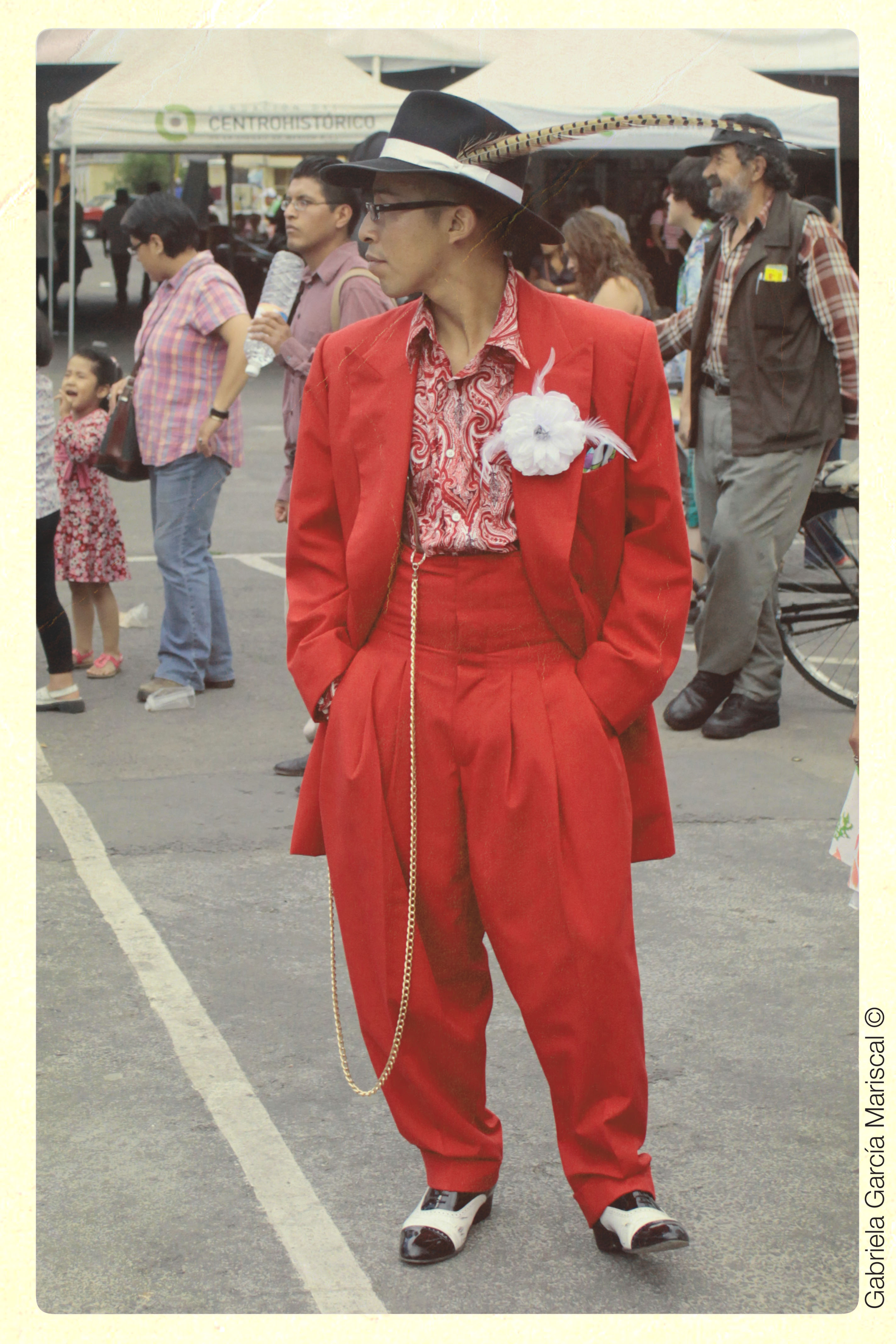
Pachuco style

Pachuco style was a dominating trend among Mexican-American youth in the 1930s-40s. Known for their distinctive look, dialogue, and behavior, Pachucos were often seen dressed in their recognizable Zoot suits, with their hair styled into ducktails. Other elements of the style included decorative chains and tattoos. The unique speech of pachucos was a very important element of their defined style. Consisting of creative phrases and some English words, Caló was a very popular form of speech among pachucos.

Pachuco fashion carried a double meaning. White American conservatives perceived it as associated with gangs and violence. The style was seen as a threat to the status quo, and the media frequently portrayed both the Mexican-American youth and their clothing as a sign of deviance and criminal behavior. On the other hand, Mexican American youth adopted the fashion to stand out and reject assimilation into White American culture. Additionally, the majority of youth who participated in Pachuco counterculture were teenagers experimenting with clothing, hair, and language. In these situations, Pachuco culture was a way for young Mexican Americans to establish themselves as adults and build up their identity with confidence.

== Culture ==
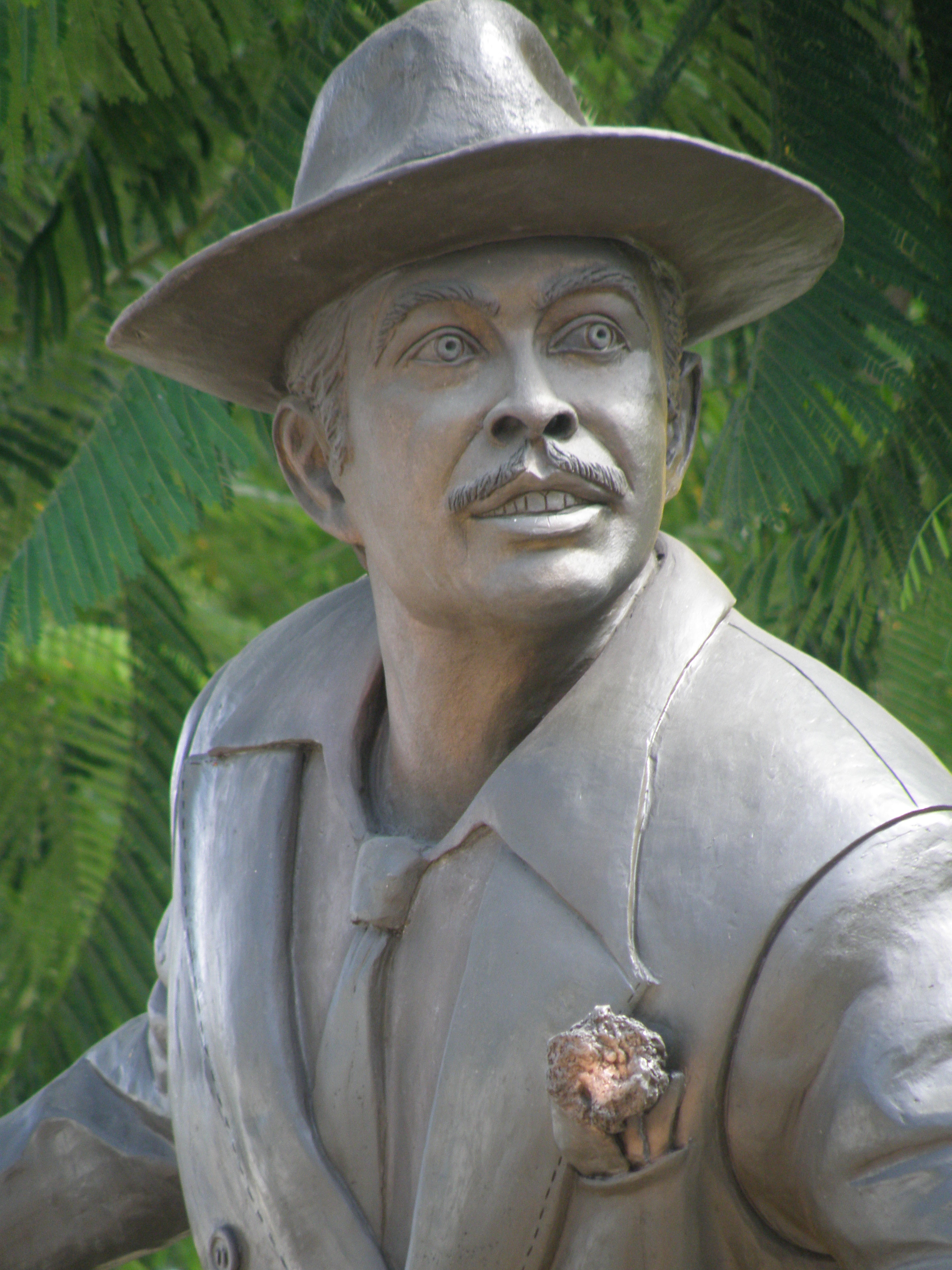
Statue of Mexican actor Germán Valdés here being depicted as "Tin Tan" and wearing a pachuco outfit

The origins of Pachuco culture can be traced to the late 1930s in El Paso, Texas. However, other early influences come from the 1940s African American Jazz culture. Zoot suits, for example, were frequently seen in Jazz clubs, and wearing the suit signaled to others that this individual was a major fan of the music. They were perceived as "the uniform of the jitterbug all over the country...young devotees of hot music." The connection between the suit and music is further seen through the suit's design. Baggy pants and loose-fitting coats allowed African American youth to carry out the acrobatic movements central to jazz dancing, while narrow cuffs would have prevented the fabric from getting caught on their shoes.

It was the exposure to African American music, such as jazz, blues, and soul, that opened the doors for Chicanos and Chicanas to develop new cultural expressions. The style, music, and language trends they adopted and altered would later spread throughout the Southwest into Los Angeles, where it developed further. In the border areas of California and Texas, a distinct youth culture known as pachuquismo developed in the 1940s and has been credited as an influence to Chicanismo. In Los Angeles, Chicano zoot suiters developed their own cultural identity, "with their hair done in big pompadours, and 'draped' in tailor-made suits ... They spoke caló, their own language, a cool jive of half-English, half-Spanish rhythms ... Out of the zoot-suiter experience came lowrider cars and culture, clothes, music, tag names, and, again, its own graffiti language." Pachuco counterculture elements were soon present both on the streets of the nation and in the media.

=== Pachucos in film ===
Films that featured Pachuco characters illustrated the counterculture as one that represented the marginalization of Chicano and Chicana youth. German Valdes's Tin Tan, for example, was a pachuco character who migrated to the US for work and returned to Mexico after being acculturated to American society. He spoke Spanglish or Calo, a dialect unique to communities living alongside the Mexico-United States border. Characters such as German Valdes' Tin Tan were accepted by many working-class Mexicans in cities and border towns for validating immigrants' experiences and highlighting a Mexican identity shaped by living in the United States. Transforming Pachucos into a caricature incorporated humor to embody an everlasting vision of marginalized Mexican and Chicano/a representations in the US. It also helped popularize borderland culture and the emerging hybrid cultural identities.

=== Pachuco in theater ===
Luis Valdez was a key figure in bringing the Pachuco to theaters. In 1978, his play Zoot Suit made its debut, which centered on a story inspired by the real-life events of the Sleepy Lagoon murder trial. The character El Pachuco represents the subculture as it is represented in the media, but also challenges those perceptions and assumptions. Valdez's staging directions and dialogue depict El Pachuco breaking character, shifting from speaking in Calo to English. With these scenes, Valdez's intentions are grounded in pushing the audience to move away from predominant stereotypes of Pachucos and Mexican-American youth. Valdez's decision to closely reference the events of the Sleepy Lagoon murder trial served to point out the role the media played in criminalizing Pachucos and justifying the violence targeted at them. The play made its Broadway debut in 1979 and was later made into a film in 1981.

The pachuco subculture declined in the 1960s, evolving into the Chicano style. This style preserved some of the pachuco slang while adding a strong political element characteristic of the late 1960s American life.

== Tensions ==
The media often portrayed Pachucos as perpetrators of violence and more likely to continue being violent in the future. Media coverage racialized the Pachuco, which resulted in the general public associating all ethnic Mexicans in the US with crime, ultimately naming them dangerous outsiders. The outbreak of World War II and the height of Pachuco culture in the 1940s further enhanced the tensions between Pachucos and White Americans. Rationing laws were passed to promote the war effort, including one regulating the distribution and use of fabric. Pachuco fashion, with its layers of undershirts, baggy pants, long and colorful jackets, chains, and hats with feathers, was consequently seen by White Americans as unpatriotic. The latter demanded Pachucos should act in solidarity with the war effort, yet White Americans did not factor in structural barriers that prevented Pachucos from doing so. First, most Pachucos were teenagers and thus were too young to enlist. Secondly, discriminatory laws existed that made it challenging for Mexican-American youth to work and effectively contribute to the war effort from home. Lastly, White Americans were also quick to disregard Pachuco's efforts to transition to slimmer and shorter clothing.

Structural inequalities and discriminatory practices towards Mexican-Americans in the 1940s changed the meaning of Pachuco culture and style. Beyond a fashion statement, the look also became a form of visible protest against the systems that created difficulties for Mexican-Americans. Pachucos would continue wearing zoot suits, a symbol of cultural pride among Mexican-Americans, though it did not fully resolve all conflicts. Their signature style and distinct dialect made Pachucos highly visible, which created an easily recognizable target for further persecution. Tensions created from public opinions about the zoot suit played a part in the start of the 1943 Zoot Suit Riots. While the Riots initially began following an altercation between sea man and young Mexican-Americans wearing zoot suits in East Los Angeles, the latter quickly became the target of a series of violent attacks. In the aftermath of the riots, Pachuco style became associated with delinquency. White Americans and popular media continued to frame Mexican-American youth as inherently prone to deviance and violence, ultimately negatively transforming public perception of the zoot suit.

== La Pachuca ==
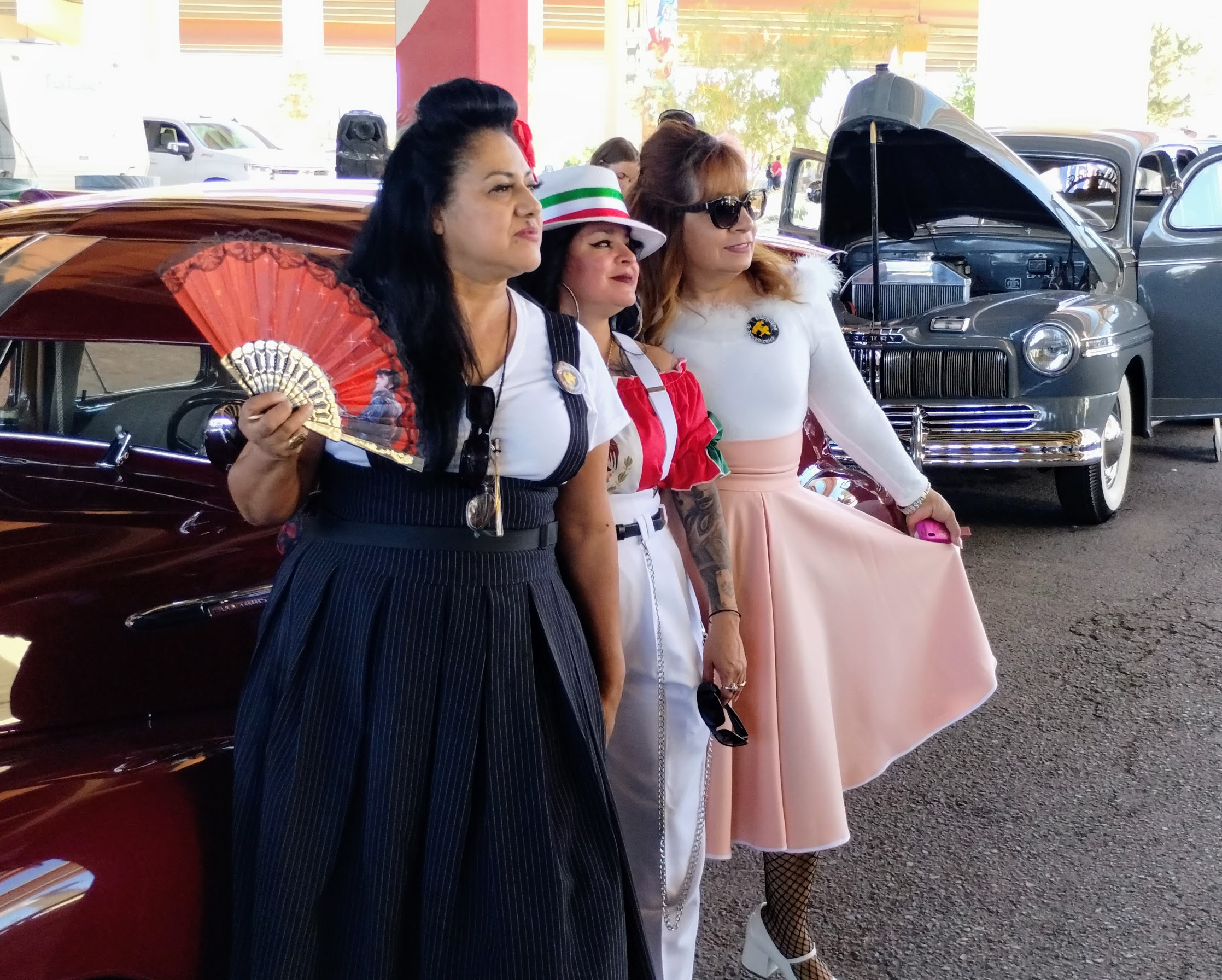
Pachucas at the Lincoln Park Car Show, El Paso, TX, September 22, 2024

The "Pachuca," the female counterpart of the Pachuco, had an aesthetic sensibility as strong as the male zoot suiter. The Pachuca's hairstyle tended to be a high "coif" or bouffant, with the hair put up in some way (a more pronounced version of the typical hair style of the time) by ratting their hair or affixing hair rats. Their makeup was heavy, particularly using a red colored lipstick. The preferred colors of clothing were black and gray. Some pachucas wore the traditionally male zoot suit, albeit with modifications to fit the female form. Sometimes, she donned the standard heavy gold pocket chain. Another variation involved a sweater or coat - often a variant on the male zoot-suit finger-tip jacket - over knee-length skirts, plus fishnet stockings or bobby socks and platform shoes.

== Costa Rica ==
In Costa Rica the term "pachuco" refers to someone who has common habits and who is often very rude.

== See also ==
- Zoot Suit Riots – a confrontation between pachucos and U.S. servicemen in Los Angeles during World War II in which unarmed pachucos were brutally beaten and jailed
- The opening scenes of the film American Me depict confrontations between pachucos and white American soldiers during the Zoot Suit Riots.
- The Sleepy Lagoon murder was a confrontation between two Los Angeles pachuco gangs that resulted in a crackdown on the culture.
- Cholo and Vato are terms for modern-day Chicano street gangsters, though the association with the zoot suit is no longer present.
- Black dandyism – another example of how fashion can be a form of resistance, self-expression, and cultural pride for marginalized communities.
