= Sleepy Lagoon murder =

1942 Los Angeles murder case

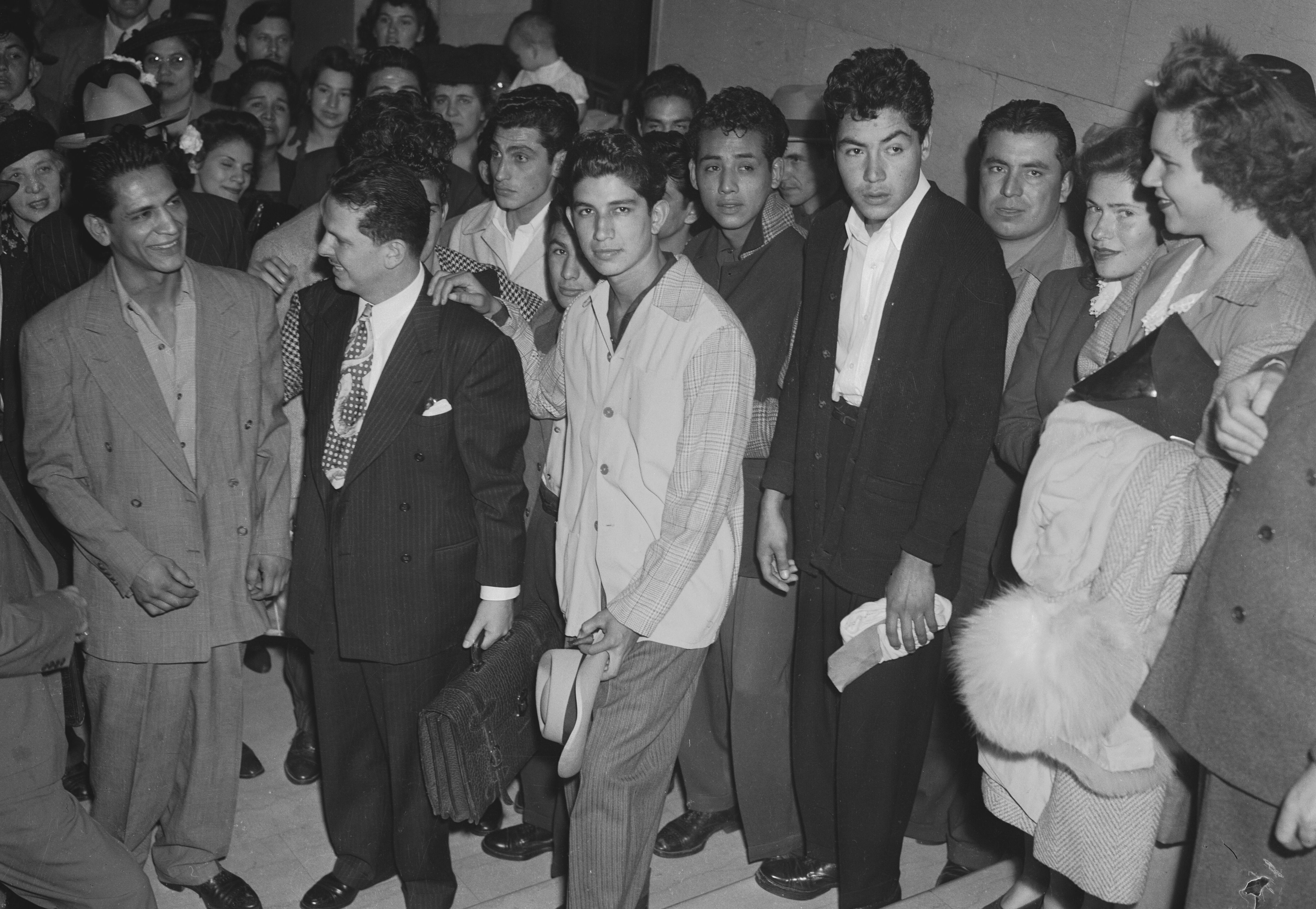
- Defendants in the Sleepy Lagoon murder trial are reunited with family following their acquittal.
- Location: 33°59′44.1″N 118°10′22.7″W; 5400 Lindbergh Lane; Bell, California, U.S.
- Date: August 2, 1942
- Deaths: 1
- Victim: José Gallardo Díaz
- Accused: Jack Melendez; Victor Thompson; Angel Padilla; John Y. Matuz; Ysmael Parra (Smiles); Victor Segobia; Henry Leyvas; Gus Zamora; Manuel Reyes; Robert Telles; Manuel Delgado; Jose Ruiz (Chepe); Henry Ynostroza

The Sleepy Lagoon murder was the 1942 death of José Gallardo Díaz, a young Mexican-American man who was found dying near a reservoir in Commerce, California, on August 2, 1942. The name Sleepy Lagoon murder was used by the Los Angeles newspapers to describe it. The case became a flashpoint for racial tension and injustice in Los Angeles.

Sleepy Lagoon was a reservoir beside the Los Angeles River, located in the city of Maywood - approximately what is now 5400 Lindbergh Lane in Bell, though some sources cite the location as 5500 Slauson Avenue. Popular among Mexican-Americans in the early 1940s, the reservoir got its name from the popular song "Sleepy Lagoon" recorded in 1942 by big band leader and trumpeter Harry James.

On the night of the incident, Díaz was attending a party hosted for Eleanor Delgadillo Coronado. After the party, Díaz left with two friends, Luis "Cito" Vargas and Andrew Torres. Shortly after, he was confronted by a group of young men from the 38th Street neighborhood, who came to the party seeking revenge for an earlier beating of some of their friends.

Díaz was later found gravely injured and transported by ambulance to Los Angeles County General Hospital. He died shortly afterwards without regaining consciousness. The hospital's autopsy showed that he was inebriated from the party and suffered a fracture at the base of his skull, possibly caused by repeated falls or an automobile accident. The exact cause of Díaz's death remains a subject of dispute. Another report said he was stabbed. However, the LAPD was quick to arrest seventeen Mexican-American youths – Jack Melendez, Victor Thompson, Angel Padilla, John Y. Matuz, Ysmael Parra (Smiles), Henry Leyvas, Gus Zamora, Manuel Reyes, Robert Telles, Manuel Delgado, Jose Ruiz (Chepe), Victor Segobia, and Henry Ynostroza – on charges of murder. The evidence was insufficient, yet the young men were held in jail without bail, which made the case highly publicized.

The trial ended on January 13, 1943, under the supervision of Judge Charles W. Fricke. Twelve of the defendants were convicted of second-degree murder and incarcerated at San Quentin Prison. The others received lesser charges and were incarcerated in the Los Angeles County Jail. However, the convictions were overturned on appeal in 1944. The case became a symbol of racial tensions in Los Angeles and was seen as a precursor to the Zoot Suit Riots later in 1943.

== Background ==
On December 8, 1941, the United States officially entered World War II following the attack of Pearl Harbor. The country mobilized for war, and the war effort would help pull the United States out of the Great Depression by creating millions of defense related industrial jobs. The population of Southern California swelled, including adding hundreds of thousands of Black southerners to the demographic. While new, good paying industrial jobs demanded a huge influx of labor, agriculture began to experience a labor shortage.

By February of 1942, President Franklin D. Roosevelt signed Executive Order 9066, which led to the Internment of Japanese Americans from the West Coast as they were seen as a security threat. The removal of Japanese Americans further contributed to the agricultural labor shortage, leading to the Bracero Program, where Mexican citizens were brought into the United States under work contracts.

The rapid influx of laborers from Mexico and defense workers of ethnic backgrounds from all across the country into Los Angeles heightened racial tensions in the city. A grand jury, headed by E. Duran Ayres, was appointed by the Los Angeles City Council to investigate an alleged "Mexican crime wave". At this time, the Zoot Suit was becoming a large trend for African American and Mexican-American "pachuco" youth and became increasingly associated by affluent whites as related to juvenile delinquency. Fueled by the sensationalist headlines about an increase in crimes by African-American and Mexican-American youth in the Los Angeles Times, Examiner and Herald Express, opinions against these youth created a prejudicial environment which would come to affect the Sleepy Lagoon Murder trial. Only the Latino newspaper La Opinion and the Black newspaper The California Eagle advocated for a fair trial and supported the Sleepy Lagoon Defense Committee.

== Death ==
The morning of August 2, 1942, José Gallardo Díaz was found unconscious and later died in the hospital. The autopsy revealed that Díaz was intoxicated and had blunt head trauma as well as multiple stab wounds, but ultimately, they could not determine a cause of death. Despite the unclear cause of death, 20-year-old Henry Leyvas and 24 members of what the media termed "the 38th Street gang" were arrested for allegedly murdering Díaz. They suspected that rival Pachuco gang fights were the cause of Díaz's death.

In response to the alleged murder, the media began a campaign calling for action against "zoot suiters". On August 10, police conducted a roundup of 600 Latinos who were charged with suspicion of assault, armed robbery, and related offenses; 175 were eventually held for various crimes. Due to this round-up of "Zoot Suiters", many families in the community began putting curfews in place to protect those that they cared about from the increasing police presence.

== Criminal trial ==
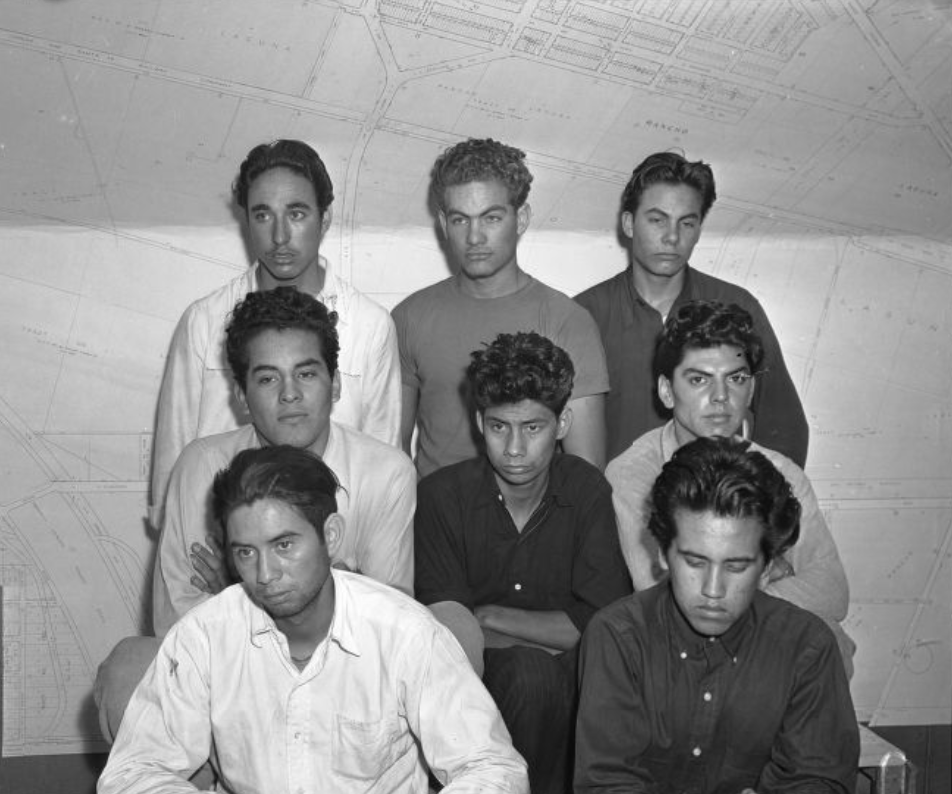
Group of eight males taken in for questioning in the Sleepy Lagoon murder investigation.

The resulting criminal trial is now generally viewed as lacking in the fundamental requirements of due process. Seventeen Latino youths were indicted on murder charges and placed on trial. The seventeen defendants were to be subject to a verdict regarding the death of Jose Diaz. Twelve of these people were declared guilty of the murder of Diaz and the other five were found guilty of assault. Ysmael Parra was one of the seventeen people who were convicted of the death of Jose Diaz. Parra was sentenced to serve five years to life in prison and was convicted with intent to commit murder. Along with Parra, Henry Ynostroza, Gus Zammora, Jack Melendez, Victor Thompson, Manuel Reyes, Angel Padilla, Robert Telles, Manuel Delgado and John Matuz all received a five-to-life sentence in prison after their conviction. Ruiz, Leyva, and Telles were immediately sentenced to life in prison for first-degree murder. Several of the accused challenged these convictions on the basis that they were racially motivated due to media portrayals of not only the defendants, but all people of color and Latinos as criminals.

The courtroom was small, and the defendants were not allowed to sit near or communicate with their attorneys during the trial. None of those charged were permitted to change their clothes during the trial, by order of Judge Fricke. The district attorney requested this order on the grounds that the jury should see the defendants wearing the zoot suits that were "obviously" worn only by "hoodlums". Every time a defendant's name was mentioned by a witness or the district attorney, regardless of how damning the statement was, the named defendant was required to stand up. Judge Fricke also permitted the chief of the Foreign Relations Bureau of the Los Angeles Sheriff's office, E. Duran Ayres, to testify as an "expert witness" that Mexicans as a community had a "blood-thirst" and a "biological predisposition" to crime and killing, citing the culture of human sacrifice practiced by their Aztec ancestors.

== Activist involvement ==
The Sleepy Lagoon Defense Committee (SLDC) was a community organization made up of Los Angeles community members and activists who came together to support the defendants. The SLDC was also known as The Citizens' Committee for the Defense of Mexican-American Youth. These activists criticized the way that Judge Fricke went about the case as a result of the manner in which the case was handled, gaining support for the defendants. The committee was labeled a Communist front organization by the California state legislature's Joint Fact-Finding Committee on Un-American Activities chaired by Jack Tenney. Actor Anthony Quinn wrote that he began raising money for the defense after his mother urged him to "remember the eggs" they had been given by a mother of one of the accused defendants during a time of poverty. He enlisted the help of Orson Welles and Eleanor Roosevelt, and was branded a communist as a result of his activities, which almost cost him his career. Some SLDC members included: Alice McGrath, Josefina Fierro de Bright, Josefa Fierro, Maria Alvez, Luisa Moreno, Dorothy Healey, LaRue McCormick, Lupe Leyvas, Henry Leyvas, Doc Johnson, Frank Lopez, Bert Corona, and Gray Bemis. The SLDC's mission was to mount a civil rights crusade so that these 12 Mexican-American defendants could have an unbiased trial. The SLDC utilized their contacts with influential community members to promote their cause and for fundraising purposes to be able to support their cause. After Judge Fricke's verdict in January, the Mexican-American youths were imprisoned without evidence and because they were "Mexican and dangerous", ipso facto. The Mexican American community was outraged and several attorneys challenged Judge Fricke's decisions: George Shibley, Robert Kenny, Clore Ware, Ben Margolis, John McTernan, Carey McWilliams, and several others. Together, they hoped to remind the European American society that minorities had the right to testify in court and have impartial jury trials. McWilliams noted that a few months earlier over, 120,000 Japanese Americans were detained and interned in detention camps, and later argued that there were common links between the Japanese-American internment and the anti-Mexican response in the Sleepy Lagoon case.

By the time the defendants began serving their convictions, there was already an uproar in how young Mexican Americans were being perceived. Rumors later began to circulate that gang members had attacked many US Navy men. As a result, many went around raiding Latino communities and began attacking them in retribution. People who were attacked were people of color or people who wore zoot suits. These attacks later became known as the Zoot Suit Riots. From 1943 through 1944, the state anti-Communist Tenney Committee subpoenaed and investigated the members of the Defense Committee in an attempt to uncover Communist ties.

== Reversal ==
In October 1944, the state Court of Appeals unanimously decided the evidence was not sufficient to sustain a guilty verdict. It reversed the 12 defendants' convictions in People v Zammora, 66 Cal.App.2d 166. The appeals court also criticized the trial judge for his bias in and mishandling of the case. After the Zoot Suit Riots, the convictions of the seventeen people were overturned. There was a lack of evidence to convict the defendants to begin with and it was Diaz's autopsy report that showed that he was highly inebriated and received trauma to the head, which likely could have been caused by his own doing. However, the convictions did not immediately get overturned. It took the efforts of the SLDC and time in order for the government to finally reverse the initial convictions. The SLDC constantly pushed the idea that the trial was an attack on young Mexican Americans and emphasized that these injustices could be fought. Not only did they do this, but they also did what they could to try to reverse the views that people had on young Mexican Americans.

== Cultural references ==
- The 1979 play Zoot Suit and the 1981 movie of the same name are loosely based on events surrounding the murder trial.
- In James Ellroy's novel The Big Nowhere, the Sleepy Lagoon murder plays a major role in the story.

== See also ==
- Zoot Suit Riots
- East Los Angeles, California
- History of Mexican Americans in Los Angeles
- List of unsolved deaths
