= Caló (Chicano) =

Cant language that originated during the early 20th century in the United States

Caló (also known as Pachuco) is an argot or slang of Mexican Spanish that originated during the first half of the 20th century in the Southwestern United States. It is the product of zoot-suit pachuco culture that developed in the 1930s and 1940s in cities along the US-Mexico border.

== Origin ==
According to Chicano artist and writer José Antonio Burciaga:

Caló originally defined the Spanish gypsy dialect. But Chicano Caló is the combination of a few basic influences: Hispanicized English; Anglicized Spanish; and the use of archaic 15th-century Spanish words such as truje for traje (brought, past tense of verb 'to bring'), or haiga, for haya (from haber, to have). These words were left in isolated pockets of Northern New Mexico and the Southwest, especially New Mexico, by conquistadores españoles.

He goes on to describe the speech of his father, a native of El Paso, Texas:

My father had a vocabulary of Spanish words that to this day are not found in popular Spanish language dictionaries. He was born into a poor, migrant farm working family in a community of people that still used ancient words that some found improper and backwards but are to be found in Miguel Cervantez's [sic] classic Don Quixote. My father commonly used words such as minjurne for mixture, or cachibaches (also used in Cuban Spanish) for junk. I would hear them without knowing their definition but I knew exactly what he meant when talking within a specific context. Some words were archaic, others were a combination of English and Spanish. And though he knew "standard" Spanish of "educated" people, he also worked, lived, laughed and cried with words that were more expressive and indigenous to the border than standard Spanish.

The Caló of El Paso was probably influenced by the wordplay common to the speech of residents of the Tepito barrio of Mexico City. One such resident was the comic film actor Germán Valdés, a native of Mexico City who grew up in Ciudad Juárez (just across the US-Mexico border from El Paso). His films did much to popularize the language in Mexico and the United States.

== Development ==
Caló has evolved in every decade since the 1940-1950s. It underwent much change during the Chicano Movement of the 1960s as Chicanos began to enter US universities and become exposed to counterculture and psychedelia. Chicano Spanish, as Gloria Anzaldúa calls it, has been portrayed as "poor Spanish" in society, making Chicano individuals uncomfortable using it in formal settings. Caló was more commonly used between young chicano men, particularly in informal settings. However, the appearance of Caló in pop culture, extended its use to a wider audience. Caló words and expressions became cultural symbols of the Chicano Movement during the 1960s and 1970s, when they were used frequently in literature and poetry. That language was sometimes known as Floricanto. Caló enjoyed mainstream exposure when the character "Cheech", played by Cheech Marin, used Caló in the Cheech and Chong movies of the 1970s.

By the 1970s, the term Pachuco was frequently shortened to Chuco. The Pachuco originated from El Paso, which was the root of the city's nickname, "Chuco Town". Pachucos usually dressed in zoot suits with wallet chains, round hats with feathers and were Chicanos.

Caló is not to be confused with Spanglish, which is not limited to Mexican Spanish. It is similar to Lunfardo in that it has an eclectic and multilingual vocabulary.

== Features ==
Caló makes heavy use of code-switching (fluidly changing between two or more languages in a single conversation or exchange). Caló uses rhyming and, in some cases, a type of rhyming slang similar to Cockney rhyming slang or African American Vernacular English jive.

Caló originated as a criminal argot used by Romani people, another marginalized group, to conceal meanings from authorities.

== Examples ==
Since Caló is primarily spoken by individuals with varying formal knowledge of Spanish or English, variations occur in words, especially of phonemes pronounced similarly in Spanish: c/s, w/hu/gu, r/d, and b/v. It is common to see the word barrio ("neighborhood") spelled as varrio, vato ("dude") spelled as bato or güero ("blond/white man") spelled as huero or even weddo.

== Usage ==
The translations should not be taken literally; they are idioms like the English "See you later alligator".

¿Qué Pasiones?
(literally "What Passions") ¿Qué Pasa? meaning "What is going on?"
¿Si ya sábanas, paquetes hilo? or Si ya Sabanas, pa' que cobijas
(literally, "If already sheets, packages thread?/covers what for") ¿Si ya sabes, pa(ra) qué te digo? meaning, "If you already know, why am I telling you?"

Occasionally, English is spoken with Mexican features. Speaking to a sibling or family member about parents, for example, a Caló speaker will refer to them as "My Mother" (Mi Mamá) instead of "Mom" or "Our mother".

Rhyming is sometimes used by itself and for emphasis.

Common phrases include:

¿Me comprendes, Méndez?
"Do you understand, Méndez?"
¿O te explico, Federico?
"Or do I explain it to you, Federico?"
Nel, pastel
"No way" (lit. "Nay, Cake")
Al rato, vato
"Later, dude" (lit. "al rato" means "later"; "vato" means friend or guy)
¿Me esperas, a comer peras?
"Will you wait for me?" (lit. "will you wait for me to eat pears?")
¿Qué te pasa, calabaza?
"Whats going on?" (lit. "What is happening to you, squash/pumpkin?")
Nada Nada, Limonada
"Not much" (lit. "Nothing, nothing, lemonade". Spoken as a response to the above, "¿Qué te pasa, calabaza?").

== In popular culture ==
- American Me
- Akwid
- Blood In Blood Out
- Cheech and Chong
- La Chilanga Banda, a song by Café Tacuba
- Culture Clash
- Don Tosti
- Edward James Olmos
- George Lopez
- Harsh Times
- Homies
- Frost - Chicano rap artist whose song "La Raza" uses Caló
- Lalo Guerrero - Pachuco swing musician
- Lowrider Magazine
- Gilbert "Magú" Luján
- La Mission (2009 movie)
- Mi Vida Loca
- Robert Rodriguez
- Sublime
- Tin Tan - actor from the Golden Age of Mexican Cinema who popularized Pachuco dress and talk
- Zoot Suit (film)
- Zoot Suit (play)
- El Mero Perro - Chicano Rap Artist and Music Producer who uses many Caló lyrics with Tejano/Chicano Pachuco themes in his songs

== See also ==
- Chicano English
- East Los
- Órale
- Pachuco

== Sources ==
- Aguilar Melantzón, Ricardo. Glosario del caló de Cd. Juárez. (translated by Federico Ferro Gay; edited by María Telles-McGeagh, Patricia A. Sullivan. Las Cruces, N.M.: Joint Border Research Institute, New Mexico State University, c1989.
- Burciaga, José Antonio. Drink Cultura: Chicanismo. Santa Barbara: Joshua Odell Editions, Capra Press, 1993. ISBN 1-877741-07-8
- Cummings, Laura. "The Pachuco Language Variety in Tucson." In Pachucas and Pachucos in Tucson: Situated Border Lives. University of Arizona Press, 2009. pp 95–131
- Fuentes, Dagoberto. Barrio language dictionary: first dictionary of Caló [by] Dagoberto Fuentes [and] José A. López. La Puente, California: El Barrio Publications, 1974.
- Galindo, D. Letticia. "Dispelling the Male-Only Myth: Chicanas and Calo." Bilingual Review 16: 1. 1992.
- Galindo, D. Letticia and María Dolores Gonzales, editors. Speaking Chicana : voice, power, and identity. Tucson: University of Arizona Press, c1999. ISBN 0-8165-1814-9 and ISBN 0-8165-1815-7 (paperback)
- Hallcom, Francine, Ph.D. "An Urban Ethnography of Latino Street Gangs in Los Angeles and Ventura Counties"
- Metcalf, Allan A. "The Study of California Chicano English". International Journal of the Sociology of Language. Volume 1974, Issue 2, Pages 53–58
- JL Orenstein-Galicia. "Totacho a Todo Dar: communicative functions of Chicano Caló along the US-Mexico border." La Linguistique (Paris. 1965)
- Ortega, Adolfo. Caló Orbis: semiotic aspects of a Chicano language variety New York: P. Lang, c1991. ISBN 0-8204-1542-1
- Ortega, Adolfo. Caló tapestry. Berkeley: Editorial Justa Publications, 1977. ISBN 0-915808-21-8
- Polkinhorn, Harry, Alfredo Velasco, and Malcom Lambert. El Libro De Caló: The Dictionary of Chicano Slang. Mountain View, California: Floricanto Press, 1988. ISBN 0-915745-19-4
- Webb, John Terrance. A lexical study of Caló and non-standard Spanish in the Southwest. (dissertation), 1976.
- Manuel Cantú - Pachuco Dictionary ISBN 978-0-615-15944-7
