= Zoot suit =

Men's suit style of the 1940s

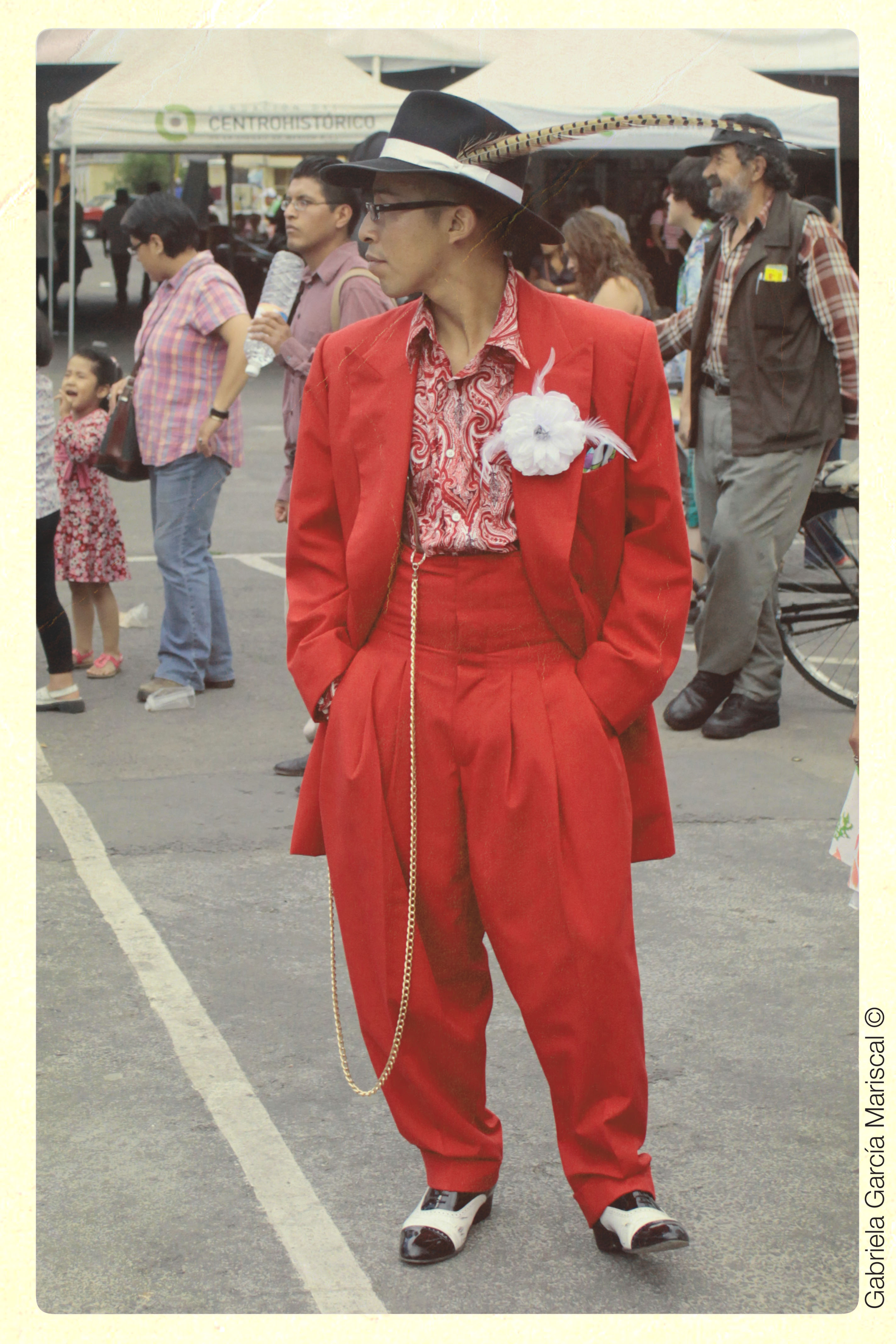
Hispanic man in zoot suit

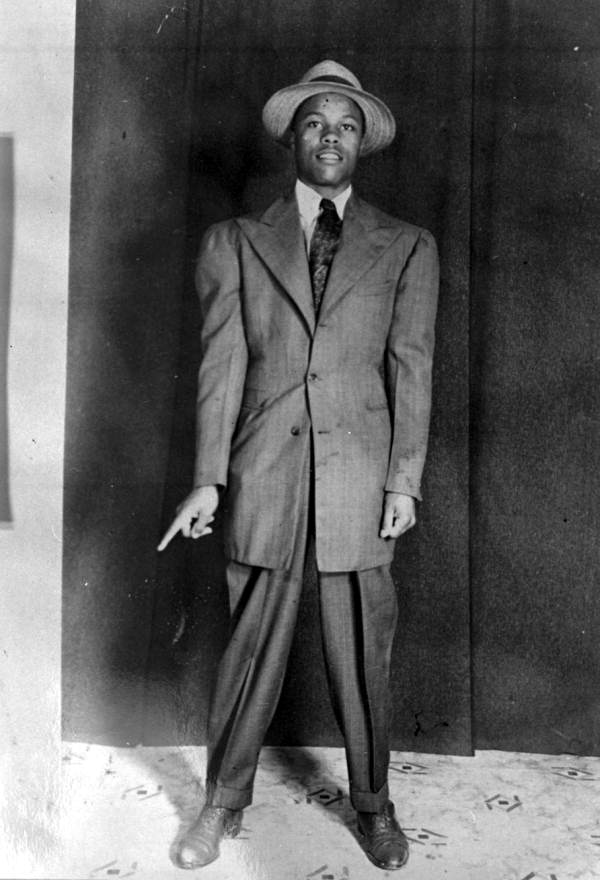
Man wearing a zoot suit c. 1942

A zoot suit (occasionally spelled zuit suit) is a men's suit with high-waisted, wide-legged, tight-cuffed, pegged trousers, and a long coat with wide lapels and wide padded shoulders. It is most notable for its use as a cultural symbol among the Hepcat and Pachuco subcultures. Originating among African Americans, it later became popular with Mexican, Filipino, Italian, and Japanese Americans in the 1940s.

The zoot suit originated in African American comedy shows within the Chitlin' Circuit in the 1920s. Comedians such as Pigmeat Markham, Stepin Fetchit, and many others would dress in rags or in colorful baggy suits for their comedic routines. This style of oversized suits would later become a popular trend in the inner-city ghettos.

Many tap and Lindy hop dancers wore loose-fitting suits to the clubs and ballrooms. These suits made it much easier to navigate the dance floor while dancing. Jazz and Jump blues singers helped popularize the style in the 1930s and 40s. Cab Calloway called them "totally and truly American". The suits were worn mainly by African American men, including a young Malcolm X. During the rationing of World War II, they were criticized as a wasteful use of cloth, wool being rationed then. In 1942, the War Production Board issued restrictions aimed at stopping the sale of zoot suits.

In the Zoot Suit Riots of 1943, groups of predominantly Mexican zoot suiters became victims of repeated racial mob violence. Wearing of the zoot suit was never banned, despite a debate of its prohibition by the Los Angeles City Council in the aftermath of the riots. The zoot suit became an important symbol of cultural pride and defiance of oppression in the Chicano Movement. It experienced a brief resurgence in the swing revival scene in the 1990s. The suit is still worn by Chicano in Mexican subcultures for memorialization events, regular celebrations, and special occasions.

== History ==
=== Hepcats ===
The suits were first associated with African-Americans in communities such as Harlem, Chicago, and Detroit in the 1930s, but were made popular nationwide by Jazz and Jump blues musicians in the 1940s. According to the Oxford English Dictionary, the word "zoot" probably comes from African American Vernacular English and reduplication of suit. The origin of the zoot suit has been disputed throughout the years. Essentially, early versions of the Zoot suits were just oversized or baggy suits, frequently seen with loud colors. Over time, it became tailored to have its own distinctive look. There was no one designer in creating the zoot suits; however, many tailors have taken credit for the definitive style and capitalized on it. Harold C. Fox, a Chicago clothier and big-band trumpeter; Charles Klein and Vito Bagnato of New York City; Louis Lettes, a Memphis tailor; and Nathan (Toddy) Elkus, a Detroit retailer. Harold C. Fox has given inspirational credit to African American teenagers for the Zoot Suits. He was quoted as saying, "The zoot was not a costume or uniform from the world of entertainment. It came right off the street and out of the ghetto."

"A Zoot Suit (For My Sunday Gal)" was a 1942 song written by L. Wolfe Gilbert and Bob O'Brien. Jazz bandleader Cab Calloway frequently wore zoot suits on stage, including some with exaggerated details, such as extremely wide shoulders or overly draped jackets. He wore one in the 1943 film Stormy Weather. In his dictionary, Cab Calloway's Cat-ologue: A "Hepster's" Dictionary (1938), he called the zoot suit "the ultimate in clothes. The only totally and truly American civilian suit."

=== Pachucos and Pachucas ===
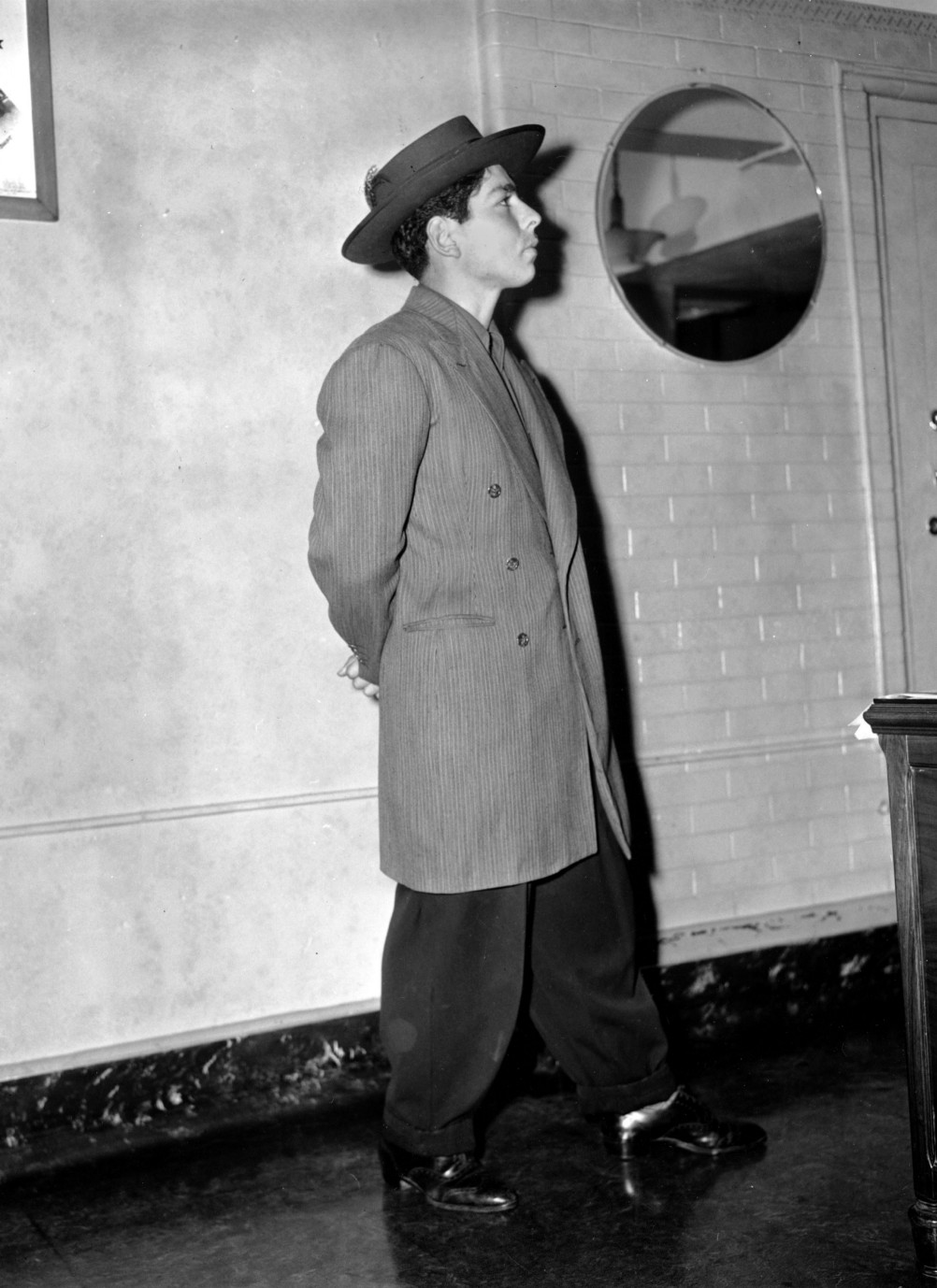
Frank Tellez, a Mexican American man, models a zoot suit while arrested during the Zoot Suit Riots (1943).

Pachucos and Pachucas were early Chicano youth who participated in a subculture that fashioned zoot suits. The subculture emerged in El Paso, Texas, in the late 1930s and quickly spread to Los Angeles. Pachucos and Pachucas embraced this style that challenged white American norms around race and gender norms The Mexican American zoot suit style was usually black, sharkskin, charcoal gray, dark blue, or brown in color with pinstripes. African American styles usually incorporated brighter colors, thick chalk stripes, floppy hats, and long chains more often than Mexican Americans. Both Pachucos and Hepcats functioned on the margins in American society. Some Pachucos and Hepcats shared solidarity or respect for one another because of this.

In the early 1940s, Pachucos were associated with violence and criminal behavior by the American media, which fueled anti-Mexican sentiment and especially negative views of the zoot suit style in Los Angeles. Pachucas, some of whom also wore the zoot suit, often with some modifications and additional accessories like dark lipstick, were seen as threatening to ideas of family stability and racial uplift, often shunned by their communities and the wider public. The zoot suits became framed as unpatriotic, referring to the excessiveness of cloth during wartime. In 1942, police from across Los Angeles arrested 600 Mexican Americans in the Sleepy Lagoon murder case, which involved the murder of José Gallardo Díaz at a party. Almost all of those arrested as allegedly potential suspects were wearing zoot suits.

Media coverage before and after the case sensationalized and further fanned the flames of hostile anti-Mexican sentiments in the city and abroad. This made some Mexican Americans hesitant to wear the zoot suit, since they did not want to be viewed as criminals simply for their style of dress. Some Pachucos became affiliated with early gangs in Los Angeles and embraced their presumed-to-be criminal status with the zoot suit. Others wore the zoot suit, but refused to refer to themselves as 'zoot suiters.' Mexican Americans who rejected Pachucos and zoot suit attire became known as 'squares' who were said to believe in assimilation and racial uplift theory.

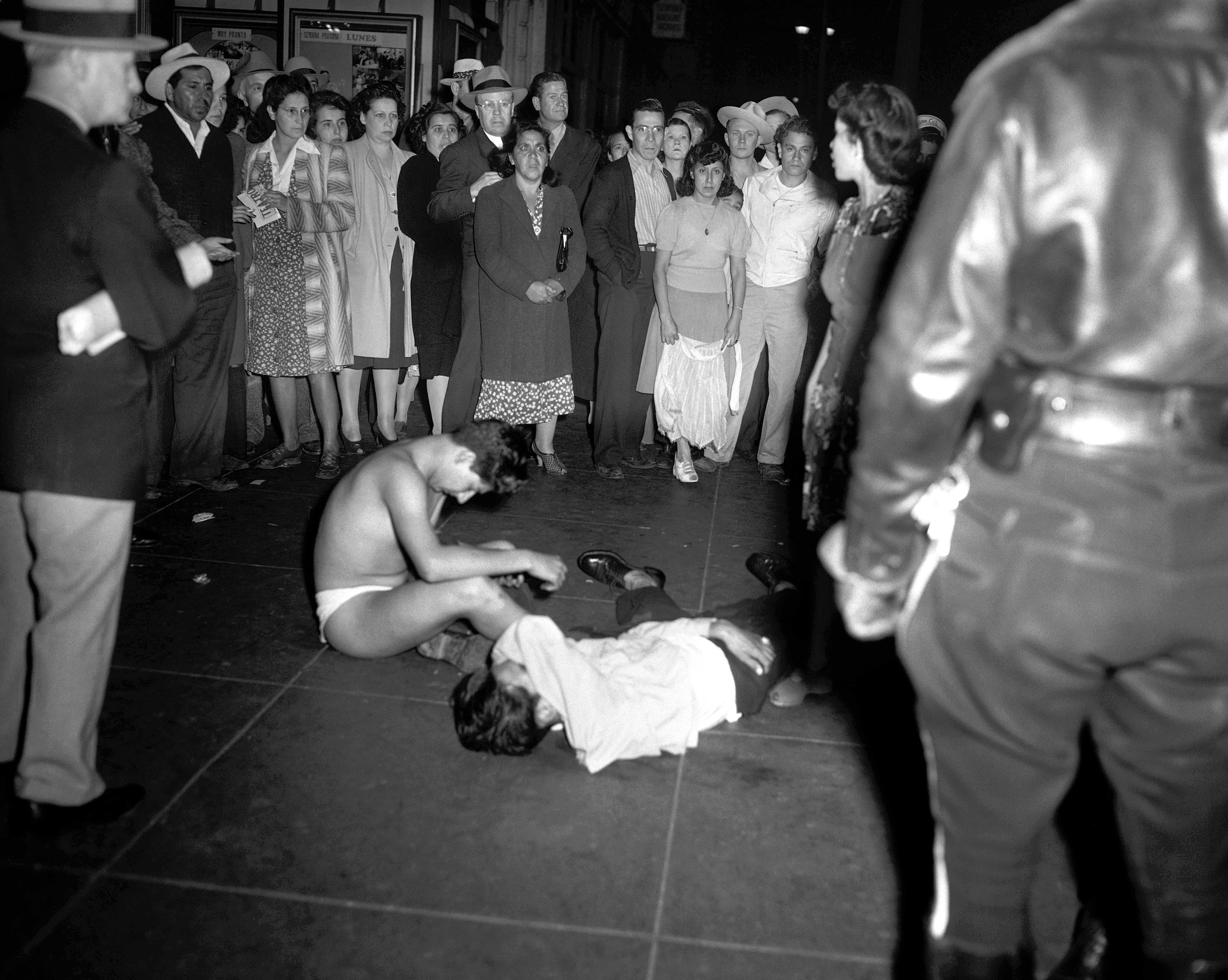
Mexican American men were stripped of their zoot suits by U.S. servicemen in the Zoot Suit Riots. Despite being attacked, many were also arrested.

This tension exploded in 1943 in a series of anti-Mexican riots in Los Angeles that became termed the Zoot Suit Riots. For ten days, white U.S. servicemen cruised Mexican American neighborhoods searching for zoot suiters to attack. In some cases, youth as young as twelve were attacked and dragged out of establishments. Filipinos and Black zoot suiters were also targeted, such as a Black man who had his eye gouged out with a knife by "a crowd of whites." After being attacked, Mexican and Black zoot suiters rioted against white U.S. servicemen. On the fifth day of the riots, the zoot suiters repelled attackers in a coordinated effort. Busloads of police were brought in to rescue "the retreating servicemen," after which "dozens of Mexicans" were arrested. Military officials declared Los Angeles off limits to servicemen the next day.

After hearing of the event, an article for the Pittsburgh [PA] Courier warned that Black zoot suiters could be the next target for "the patriotic lawlessness of men in uniform" and stated that both "Los Angeles Negro and Mexican zoot suiters are closer together than they are to members of their own racial group." Norris J. Nelson, Los Angeles City Council member, proposed outlawing zoot suits, although this did not occur due to questions about its constitutionality.

Cesar Chavez sported zoot suit attire in his younger years, and the zoot suit became an important cultural symbol for the Chicano Movement. The earliest youth who reclaimed the word Chicano as an identity of empowerment were in fact Pachucos.

=== White Americans ===
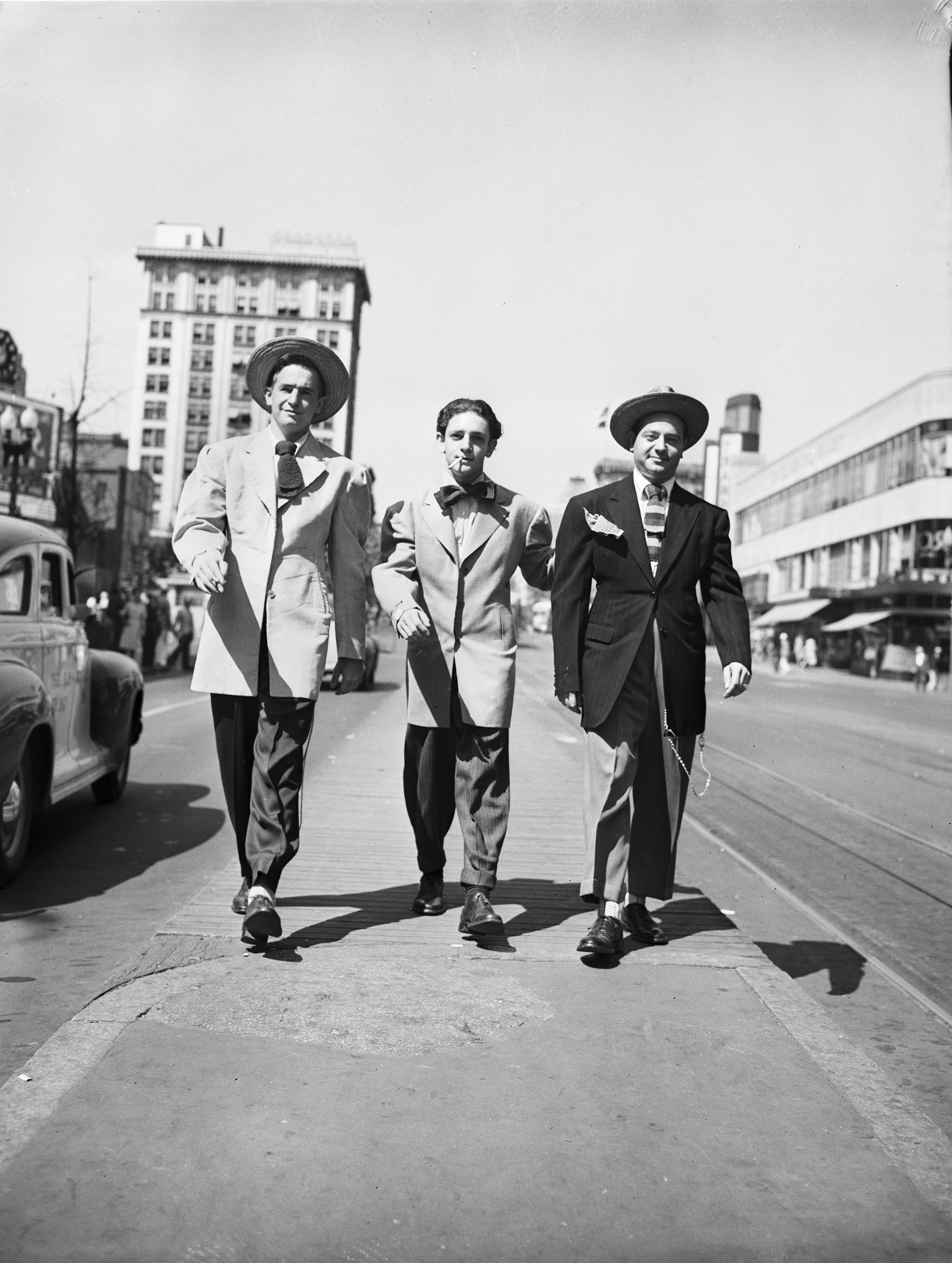
Three men wearing zoot suits in 1946

Throughout the 1940s, white American views on the zoot suit varied. The jive talk of African American hepcats had spread among white middle class youth in the early 1940s. This began to reduce stress on the origins of the zoot suit as a Black cultural symbol, which made it more acceptable to white Americans. Before the Zoot Suit Riots, the zoot suit was sometimes positioned as a symbol of American individualism and even patriotism in comparison to the fascist uniform attire and regimentation of Nazi Germany. White and Black soldiers were sometimes seen "zooting" their uniforms in war effort photos, with the press presenting the zoot suit as a symbol of youthful relatability rather than as an oppositional or unpatriotic symbol. Most of the visible tension surrounding the zoot suit before the riots was concentrated in the Los Angeles area regarding the spread of anti-Mexican sentiment among whites in the city.

=== Trinidad ===
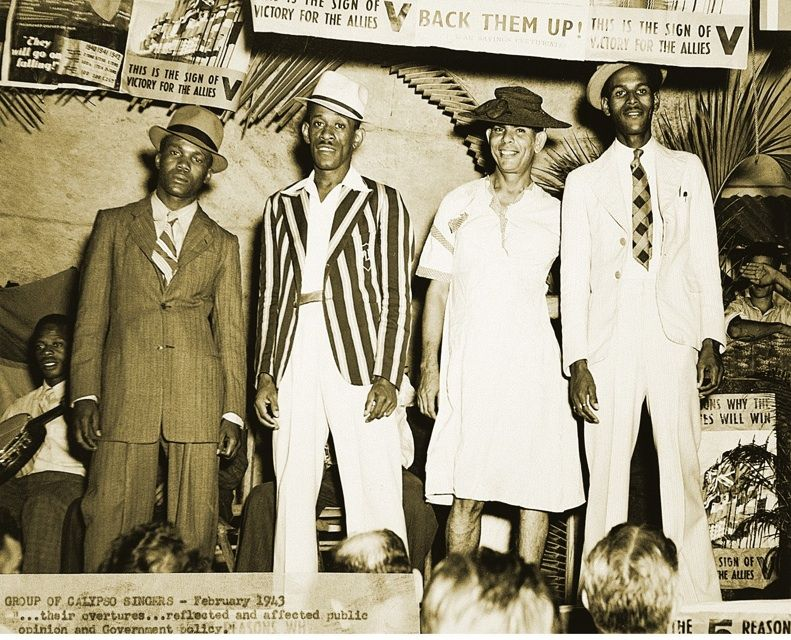
Calypso singers

Zoot suits not only played a historical role in the subculture in the United States in the 1940s, but also shaped a new generation of men in Trinidad. These Trinidadian men who adopted this American fashion became referred to as the "saga boys"; they wore these suits and embraced the glamorous lifestyle that they represented. "Their fondness for the zoot suit, in particular signified a rejection of Anglo-centric precepts not only about fashion but, more profoundly, about manhood."

Therefore, although the "saga boys" had the appearance of adapting to the urban American way of life, they were in fact using this clothing and lifestyle as a way to improve their lives in Trinidad, rise above the restrictions that imperialism brought, and create, through this oppositional dress, a culture of their own.

=== Swing revival era ===
In the swing revival era, which started in 1989 and carried to about 1998, the zoot suit experienced a small resurgence mostly based in nostalgia of the 1940s era, yet notably missed many of the racial dynamics that surrounded the zoot suit. Bands included The Brian Setzer Orchestra, Royal Crown Revue, and Cherry Poppin' Daddies. One of the popular songs of the era was the Cherry Poppin' Daddies' "Zoot Suit Riot", which presented the historical moment of the Zoot Suit Riots through a lens of masculine power.

=== Contemporary ===
The zoot suit is regularly memorialized by the Chicano community today as a symbol of cultural pride. Some of this is owed to Luis Valdez's 1979 play Zoot Suit and its subsequent 1981 film, which carried knowledge of the era and interest in the style forward. Outside of memorialization events, such as those held on the anniversary of the Zoot Suit Riots, the zoot suit is still sometimes worn by Chicanos for special occasions, including proms, usually as a dual display of formal wear and cultural pride. It is also worn in certain urban areas in Mexico for similar purposes.

== Characteristics ==
Traditionally, zoot suits have been worn with a fedora or pork pie hat color-coordinated with the suit, occasionally with a long feather as decoration, and pointy, French-style shoes or saddle shoes.

Zoot suits usually featured a watch chain dangling from the belt to the knee or below, then back to a side pocket. A woman accompanying a man wearing a zoot suit would commonly wear a flared skirt and a long coat.

The amount of material and tailoring required made them luxury items, so much so that the U.S. War Production Board said that they wasted materials that should be devoted to the World War II war effort. When Life published photographs of zoot suiters in 1942, the magazine joked that they were "solid arguments for lowering the Army draft age to include 18-year-olds". This extravagance, which many considered unpatriotic in wartime, was a factor in the Zoot Suit Riots.

To some, wearing the oversized suit was a declaration of freedom and self-determination, even rebelliousness. Some observers claim that the "Edwardian-look" suits with velvet lapels worn by Teddy Boys in Britain are a derivative of the zoot suit.

== See also ==
- Zazou – Subculture in France during World War II
