= Pancho López =

Pancho López may refer to:

- Pancho López, a parody of Pancho Villa in The Bad Man (play) 1920, and three film versions of the play
- Pancho López (comics), early Argentine comic strip
- "Pancho López" (song), parody of "Davy Crockett" by Lalo Guerrero 1955
- Pancho López (performance artist)
