= Alice McGrath =

American activist (1917–2009)

Alice Greenfield McGrath
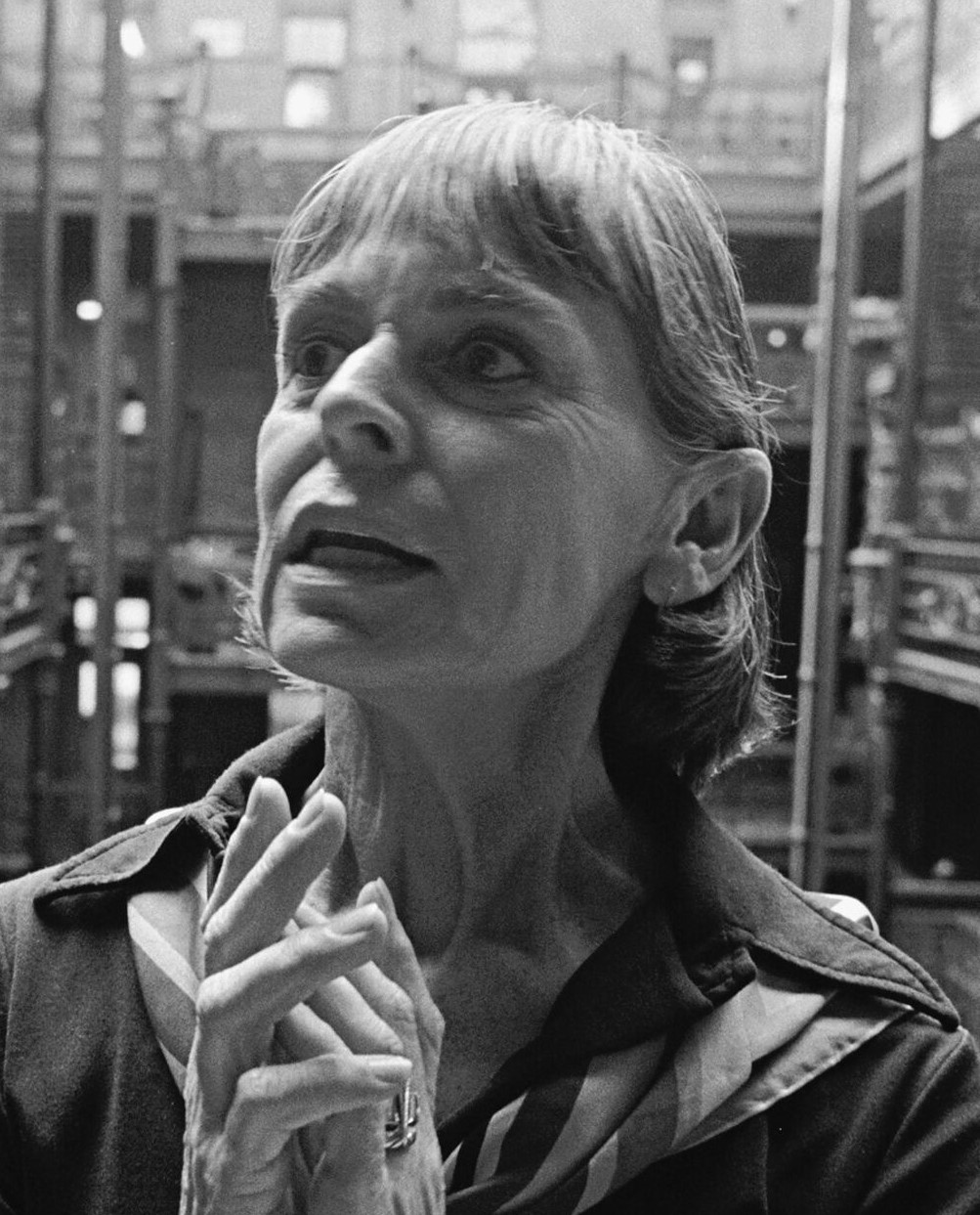
- McGrath in 1978
- Born: 5 April 1917; Calgary, Alberta, Canada
- Died: 27 November 2009 (aged 92); Ventura, California
- Spouse(s): Max Schechter, Thomas McGrath, and Bruce Tegner

Alice Greenfield McGrath (April 5, 1917 – November 27, 2009), also known as Alice Greenfield, was an American activist who gained fame in connection with the 1942 case of the Sleepy Lagoon Murder. She was the executive secretary of the Sleepy Lagoon Defense Committee from 1942 to 1944. She later married blacklisted poet Thomas McGrath, organized a pro bono legal service organization in Ventura County, California, and led 86 missions to Nicaragua in the 1980s and 1990s.

== Early years ==
McGrath was born Alice Greenfield in Calgary, Alberta, Canada, in 1917. She was the daughter of Russian Jewish immigrants. She spoke only Yiddish until she attended school. She moved with her family to Los Angeles, California in 1922.

After graduating from high school, McGrath briefly attended Los Angeles City College. Her family was not able to afford the cost of college, and she dropped out during her first semester. She became friends with members of the New Negro Theater where she once performed a reading of Langston Hughes' poetry, with Hughes in the audience. She later recalled, "I did it, but badly. Afterward I apologized to Langston Hughes and we laughed about it."

McGrath worked in a series of menial jobs, including work in a Los Angeles candy factory, but focused her attention on progressive political issues. Among other activities, she did volunteer work for the Congress of Industrial Organizations ("CIO"). McGrath later recalled: "Everything I was concerned with was right there at the CIO. The organization was interested not only in wages but also in social issues that go along with wages. I felt at home there."

== Sleepy Lagoon case ==
In 1942, attorney George Shibley retained McGrath to assist in his defense of 22 Mexican American youths accused in the Sleepy Lagoon Murder, the largest mass trial in California history. The youths, aged 17 to 21, were accused of killing a Mexican farmworker near a swimming hole in a section of southeast Los Angeles County then known as Sleepy Lagoon. McGrath was recovering from a bout of pleurisy, and Shibley brought her the transcript of the trial to summarize each day's testimony. When she recovered from her illness, McGrath began attending the trial in person. During the 13-week trial, the judge did not allow the defendants to confer with counsel and refused to let them cut their hair or receive fresh clothing. McGrath recalled, "I was enraged. I just was so upset about the way the judge and the whole way this trial was going. The behavior of the judge was simply unacceptable in any decent society."

The jury, which was all white, convicted 12 of the defendants – three on counts of first-degree murder and nine on counts of second-degree murder. All twelve were sent to San Quentin Prison. The case is considered a precursor to the Zoot Suit Riots of 1943.

After the convictions, McGrath became the executive secretary of the Sleepy Lagoon Defense Committee from 1942 to 1944. Working with Carey McWilliams, McGrath published a newsletter, spoke in public about the cause, and raised money to support an appeal of the convictions. At one event, she raised $1,000 after making a speech to longshoremen in San Francisco. She was also a frequent correspondent with, and visitor of, the Sleepy Lagoon defendants at San Quentin. The committee's supporters included Orson Welles, Rita Hayworth, Nat King Cole, and Anthony Quinn.

While McGrath was working for the Sleepy Lagoon Defense Committee, the group was charged with being a Communist-front organization, and the FBI conducted surveillance of its members. McGrath later recalled, "The FBI would come to neighbors asking questions. I found out much later through the Freedom of Information Act that [the committee's] file was filled with lies. I was much more concerned in those days because they could take anybody and put them away."

In October 1944, the Court of Appeal in People v Zamora 66 Cal.App.2d 166, overturned the convictions, finding insufficient evidence of the defendants' guilt, and also pointing to the denial of the defendants' right to counsel and the bias of trial court judge. McGrath was the one who sent the telegram to San Quentin informing the Sleepy Lagoon defendants of the successful appeal.

In 1981, McGrath told a Los Angeles Times interviewer that Sleepy Lagoon appeal was "the most important event in my life. If I had never done anything since ... my involvement in Sleepy Lagoon would justify my existence."

== Portrayals in the media ==
McGrath's role in the Sleepy Lagoon case was the focus of the 1978 play Zoot Suit (debut at the Mark Taper Forum) and 1981 motion picture Zoot Suit. Actress Tyne Daly played the part of "Alice Bloomfield" (based on McGrath) in the motion picture. Luis Valdez, the author of "Zoot Suit," said of McGrath: "She was one of the heroines of the 20th century. In Los Angeles, I can't think of many people who surpass her influence." McGrath's role in the events was also depicted in the film "Zoot Soot Riots" broadcast on PBS as part of the "American Experience" series.

McGrath was also profiled by Studs Terkel in his book Coming of Age: The Story of Our Century By Those Who've Lived It.

In 1996, independent filmmaker, Bob Giges, released a documentary film about McGrath's life called "From Sleepy Lagoon to Zoot Suit: The Irreverent Path of Alice McGrath."

== Later years ==
McGrath remained active in progressive issues for more than 50 years. McGrath moved to Ventura, California, in 1970, where she lived for the rest of her life. In 1986, after learning that the local bar association had no pro bono program, she offered to start one and for two years she was a full-time volunteer, working with attorneys and court personnel as a client advocate.

In the 1980s, McGrath developed a passion for Nicaragua and the Sandinista movement. McGrath developed a respect for the social justice programs in Nicaragua. She said, "School was free through college. They had special training for children with disabilities. I thought it was heaven. I fell in love with Nicaragua. I decided to lead delegations there just to see Nicaragua. Doctors to doctors. Teachers to teachers. Farmers to farmers." McGrath led a total of 86 trips to Nicaragua on behalf of 40 different organizations.

McGrath held jobs as a publisher's sales representative, production manager for an art film, retail clerk, figure model, and teacher of self-defense for women.

McGrath was married three times. Her first husband was real estate developer Max Schechter, with whom she had two children, a daughter, Laura D'Auri, and a son, Daniel Schechter. After a divorce, she married Thomas McGrath, a college professor and poet who was blacklisted during the McCarthy era. The second marriage also ended in divorce. Her third husband, Bruce Tegner, was a martial arts instructor with whom she co-wrote several books on self-defense and martial arts. She held a brown belt in judo.

In November 2009, McGrath died at age 92 after developing a major infection.

McGrath's papers, including correspondence with the Sleepy Lagoon defendants, have been donated to UCLA and are available through the Online Archive of California.
