= Spirit Halloween: The Movie =

2022 horror film directed by David Poag

- Promotional release poster
- Directed by: David Poag
- Written by: Billie Bates
- Produced by: Shannon Houchins; Noor Ahmed; Michael Hagerty
- Starring: Donavan Colan; Marissa Reyes; Jaiden J. Smith; Dylan Martin Frankel; Rachael Leigh Cook; Christopher Lloyd
- Cinematography: Andy Kugler
- Edited by: Joel Griffen
- Music by: Jordan Lehning
- Production companies: Strike Back Studios; Hideout Pictures; Particular Crowd; Film Mode Entertainment; Spirit Halloween Superstores, LLC
- Distributed by: Strike Back Studios
- Release date: September 30, 2022
- Running time: 82 minutes
- Country: United States
- Language: English
- Box office: $81,377

Spirit Halloween: The Movie is a 2022 American supernatural horror film directed by David Poag in his feature film directorial debut, and written by Billie Bates. Produced in partnership with the Spirit Halloween retailer, the film stars Christopher Lloyd and Rachael Leigh Cook, and follows three middle schoolers who find themselves locked in a haunted Spirit Halloween store on Halloween night.

Spirit Halloween: The Movie was released theatrically on September 30, 2022, before being released on video-on-demand (VOD) platforms on October 11, 2022. The film received mixed reviews from critics.

== Plot ==
In the 1940s, Alec Windsor threatens a woman so he can purchase her land. The woman reveals herself as a witch and casts a spell that kills Windsor.

In 2022 three teenage friends - Jake, Bo and Carson - are quarreling. Jake has not moved on since his father's death from blood cancer, causing friction with his mother, his new stepfather, and his young stepsister. He wants to go trick-or-treating with his friends like they always have, but Carson is eager to do something more exciting and less childish. Bo cautiously agrees with Carson. The three friends go to a Spirit Halloween pop-up store. Carson suggests they hide while and spend Halloween night in the store. As the three friends play with products inside the store, a threatening animatronic comes to life.

Carson's sister Kate, on whom Jake has a crush, is trying to locate the boys to give Carson his phone. She realizes they are inside the store by seeing photos on Jake's Instagram account. She joins them in the store, unaware of the danger.

The friends discover Windsor's ghost is able to possess objects and people. Windsor possesses various animatronics in the store as the teens avoid his attacks or disable his bodies. Eventually he possesses Kate. As they deal with the crisis, Bo argues that Jake needs to process his grief and that Carson should help him. Kate expels Windsor, defeating him at last.

Having reconciled, the friends leave the store and find Jake's mother in the parking lot. She scolds them for their recklessness, but she is relieved that they're safe. A Spirit Halloween employee returns to find the store in shambles.

One year later, Jake has improved his relationship with his stepfamily. He takes his stepsister trick-or-treating, and agrees to meet Bo and Carson at Kate's party afterwards. In the closing moments, Bo's grandmother, Grandma G, seems to revive Windsor's ghost, and is also the young girl with the woman who cast the spell on Windsor, who witnessed Windsor's death.

== Cast ==
- Donovan Colan as Jake, a young teenager whose father has died.
- Marissa Reyes as Kate, Carson’s older sister on whom Jake has a crush.
- Jaiden J. Smith as Bo, Jake's friend.
- Dylan Frankel as Carson, Kate's younger brother and Jake's maturing other friend.
- Rachael Leigh Cook as Sue, Jake's mother, and a recently remarried widow.
- Christopher Lloyd as Alec Windsor, a wealthy land developer who is killed by a witch Halloween night. His spirit haunts the town one hour every Halloween.
- Marla Gibbs as Grandma G, a local witch and Bo’s grandma.
- Brad Carter as Frank

== Production ==
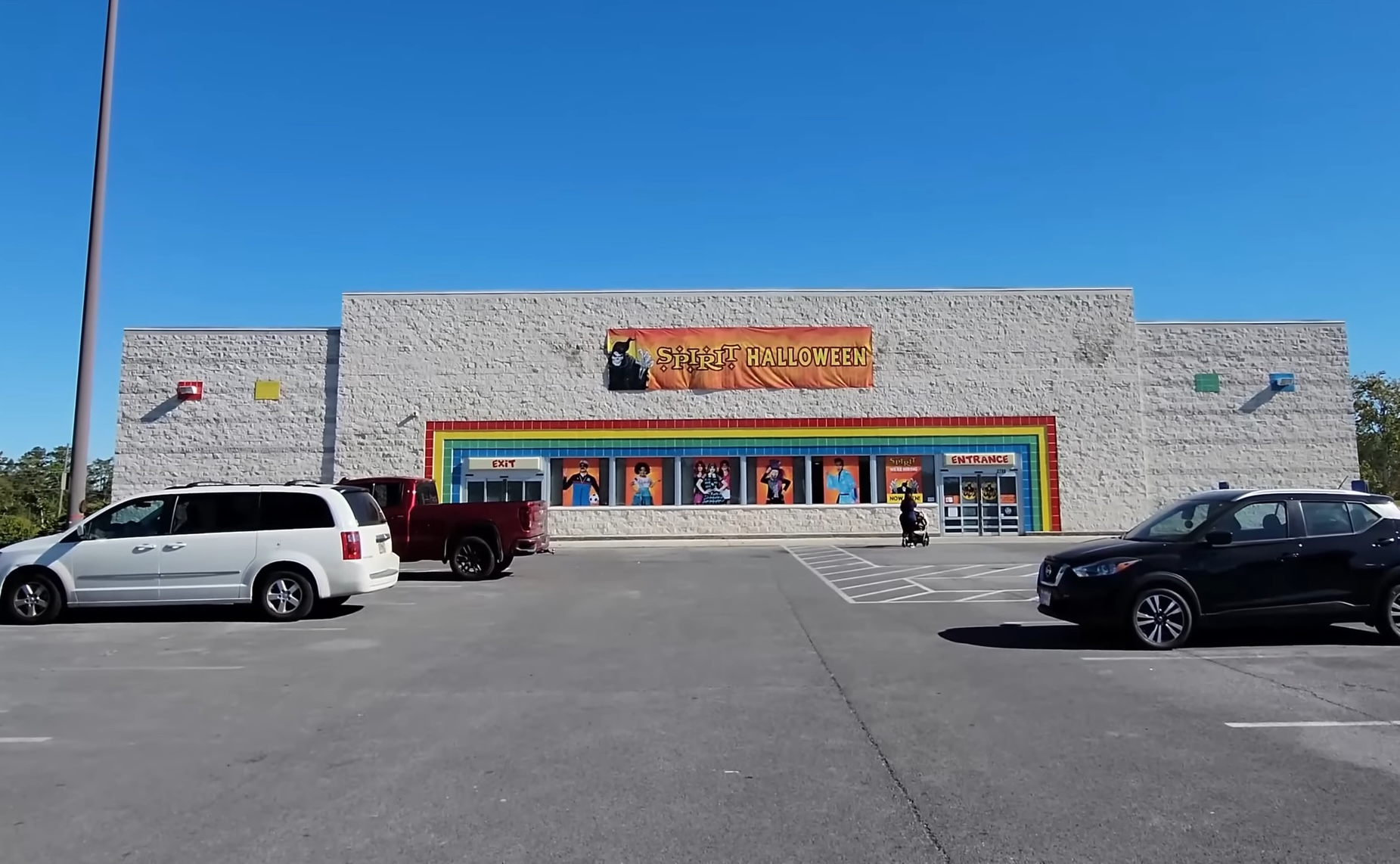
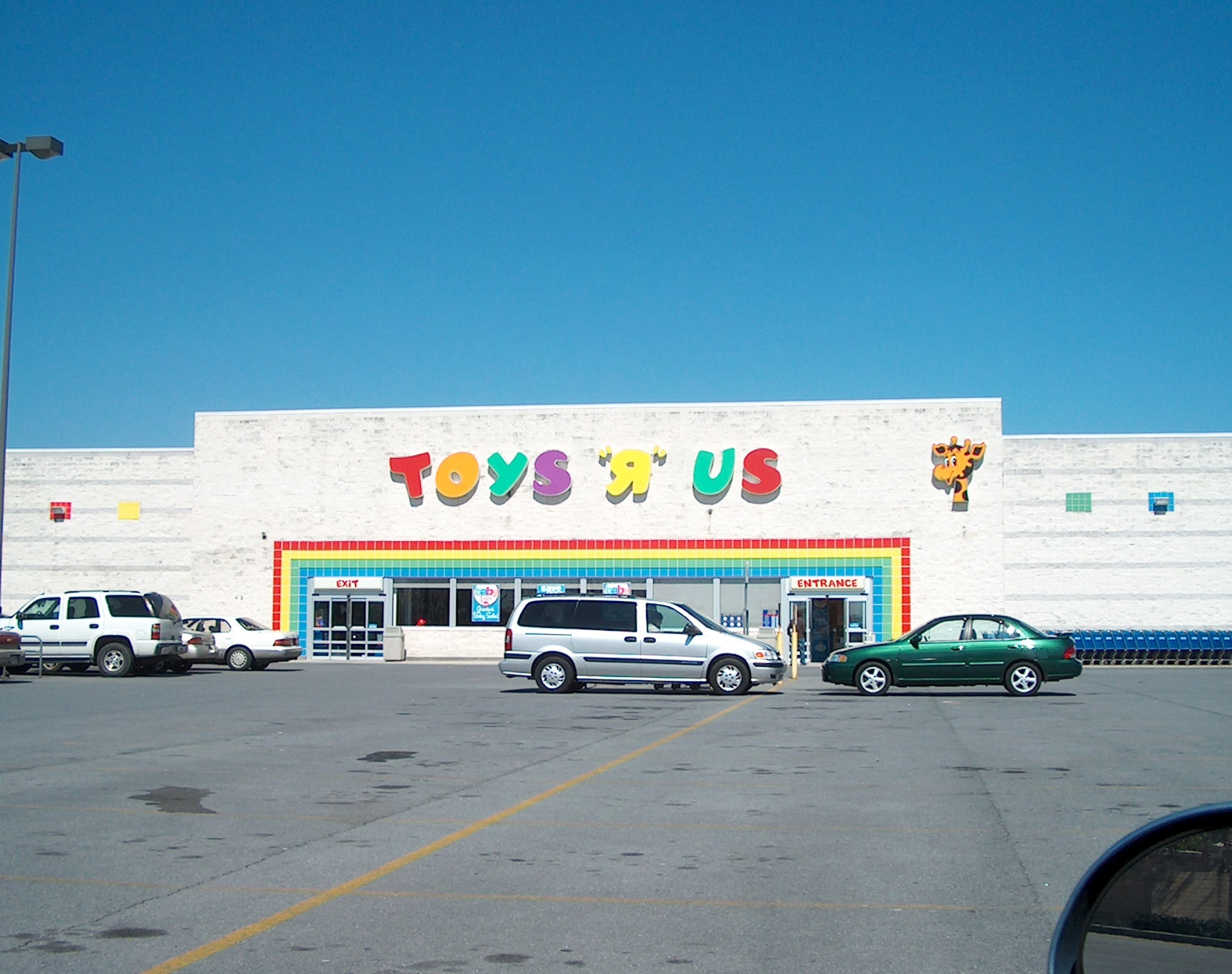
The film was shot at a "Spirit Halloween" in Rome, Georgia (top) formerly occupied by Toys "R" Us (pictured in 2006, bottom).

Production on Spirit Halloween: The Movie began in late 2021 and wrapped in February 2022. While casting auditions were held in fall 2021, the film was not publicly announced until April 11, 2022, when Christopher Lloyd and Rachael Leigh Cook were confirmed to star in it. The film is produced by Strike Back Studios, Hideout Pictures, Particular Crowd and Film Mode Entertainment in an official partnership with Spirit Halloween.

Noor Ahmed, president of Strike Back Studios, stated, "One of the reasons I immediately connected with the script is it is very much inspired by some of my favorite kid adventure films growing up, from The Goonies, Gremlins, Monster Squad, and so many great films made by Amblin Entertainment".

The film was shot in Rome, Georgia and Nashville, Tennessee. The film was also shot at an actual Spirit Halloween store in Rome, which was formerly occupied by Toys "R" Us.

== Release ==
=== Distribution ===
The film was released theatrically on September 30, 2022, by Strike Back Studios with the film being released on video-on-demand on October 11, 2022.

=== Marketing ===
A trailer for the film premiered at the opening of Spirit Halloween's flagship store in Egg Harbor Township, New Jersey, on July 30, 2022. The trailer was also shown at Midsummer Scream, a Halloween- and horror-themed convention in Long Beach, California, on July 31. On August 1, 2022, the trailer was released albeit a different version followed by a second trailer on September 8, 2022.

== Critical response ==
The film has received a relatively negative reception. On the review aggregator website Rotten Tomatoes, the film has an approval rating of 54% based on 26 critics' reviews, with an average rating of 4.8/10. The site's consensus reads: "Neither a trick nor much of a treat, Spirit Halloween: The Movie is a decent but overall unmemorable choice for families seeking spooky season viewing options". On Metacritic, the film has a weighted average score of 48 out of 100 based on eight critics' reviews, indicating "mixed or average reviews".

Meagan Navarro of Bloody Disgusting gave the film a score of two-and-a-half out of five, writing that it "serves as an effective showcase of the store's catalog", but "never fully utilizes its store setting to its advantage, though. The feature opts to spotlight only a handful of items in what amounts to an endless chase between the boys and a ghostly villain instead of using the setup to build an atmosphere or a haunted funhouse feel." Navarro concluded that, "it's not the story or its characters that linger in mind once those end credits hit; it's the items that'll fill up your Spirit Halloween wish lists." Jordan Hoffman of The A.V. Club gave the film a grade of "C–", likening the experience of watching it to the experience of visiting a Spirit Halloween store: "Most of the stuff in there is, let's face it, mass-produced crap. [...] It's all smiles going in, which turns quickly to boredom, before an unsatisfied exit." Hoffman called the film "harmless and less than 80 minutes if you turn it off before the credits are done. It's just so embarrassingly thin. The few chuckles are all the more depressing when you realize that this could have been a winner with a clever screenwriter and a competent director."

== See also ==
- List of films set around Halloween
