= Zoot Suit (play) =

- 1979 Broadway Playbill
- Music: Daniel Valdez and Lalo Guerrero
- Lyrics: Lalo Guerrero
- Book: Luis Valdez
- Basis: The Sleepy Lagoon murder trial
- Productions: 1979 Broadway; 1981 film

Zoot Suit is a play written by Luis Valdez, featuring incidental music by Daniel Valdez and Lalo Guerrero. Zoot Suit is based on the Sleepy Lagoon murder trial and the Zoot Suit Riots. Debuting in 1979, Zoot Suit was the first Chicano play on Broadway. In 1981, Luis Valdez also directed a filmed version of the play, combining stage and film techniques.

== Plot ==
Zoot Suit tells the story of Henry Reyna and the 38th Street Gang, who were tried for the Sleepy Lagoon murder in Los Angeles, during World War II. After a run-in with a neighboring gang at the local lovers lane, Sleepy Lagoon, the 38th Street Gang gets into a fight at a party, where a young man is murdered. Discriminated against for their zoot suit-wearing Chicano identity, twenty-two members of the 38th Street Gang are placed on trial for the murder, found guilty, and sentenced to life in San Quentin prison. Meanwhile, in Los Angeles, Henry's brother Rudy is beaten and stripped of his zoot suit during the Zoot Suit Riots.

Through the efforts of George and other lawyers, as well as activist-reporter Alice, with whom Henry has a brief romantic encounter, the boys win their court appeal and are freed. The play ends with a Reyna family reunion as Henry returns home and Rudy is about to leave to join the Marines. The scene suggests that it is not the happy ending we expect, however, as multiple endings of Henry's story are suggested: that he returned to prison and drug abuse, died in the war in Korea and was awarded the Medal of Honor posthumously, or married Della and had five children.

== Characters ==
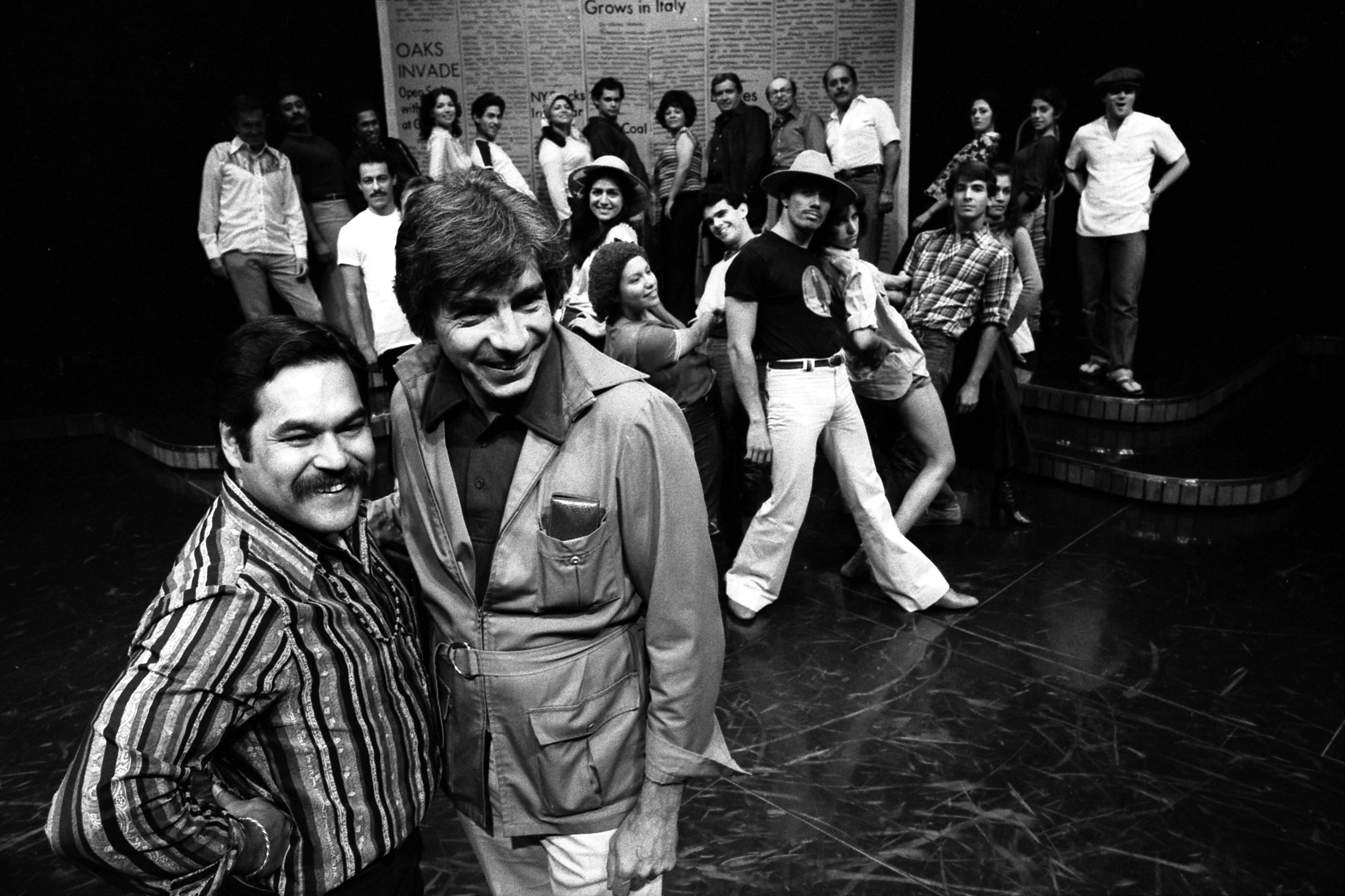
Valdez with Gordon Davidson and the cast of Zoot Suit

- El Pachuco: an allegorical character of the Chicano sub-culture of the same name.
- Henry Reyna: leader of the 38th Street Gang
- Enrique Reyna: Henry's father
- Dolores Reyna: Henry's mother
- Lupe Reyna: Henry's sister
- Rudy Reyna: Henry's brother
- George Shearer: lawyer for Henry and the 38th Street boys
- Alice Bloomfield: reporter and activist for Henry's case, as well as a brief love interest of Henry's
- Della Barrios: 38th Street Gang member and Henry's girlfriend
- The 38th Street Gang: includes Smiley Torres, Joey Castro, Tommy Roberts, Elena Torres, and Bertha Villarreal
- Rafas: leader of the Downey Gang, rival to the 38th Street Gang
- Downey Gang: include Ragman, Hobo, Cholo, Zooter, Guera, Hoba, Blondie, and Little Blue
- Lieutenant Edwards and Sergeant Smith: detectives
- Members of the Press: includes Press (who doubles as the prosecution), Cub Reporter, and Newsboy
- The Court: includes Judge F. W. Charles and Bailiff
- Prison guard
- Military men: include Bosun's Mate, Sailors, Marine, Swabbie, Manchuka, and Shore Patrolman
- Extras: Girls, Pimp, Cholo

== Historical context ==
=== The Sleepy Lagoon Murder ===
Zoot Suit is based on the Sleepy Lagoon Murder of 1942 and the Zoot Suit Riots of 1943 in Los Angeles, California. On August 1, 1942 José Díaz was at a birthday party at the Williams Ranch. A disturbance occurred around 11:00 p.m. when a group of twenty white men from the Downey suburb arrived uninvited, complaining about a lack of beer. The group from Downey Gang were kicked out of the party after demanding more beer.

Meanwhile, a group of men and women from 39th street drove their cars to the nearby swimming hole and lovers lane, dubbed "Sleepy Lagoon", also on the Williams Ranch. Among the group were Henry Leyvas and his girlfriend Dora Baca, from whom the characters Henry Reyna and Della are contrived. Also with them was friend Bobby Telles. As the group socialized, three men pulled up and began yelling insults, met equally with words from Leyvas. The three drove off. The 38th street group wandered off until they heard a commotion from the parked cars, where Leyvas and Baca remained. A group of about sixteen men from the Downey gang were beating Leyvas and Baca, prompting members of the 38th street group to defend their friends. After the Downey group left, the group from 38th street gang left to gather more of their group, prior to returning to the Williams Ranch.

The group arrived at Sleepy Lagoon around 1:00 a.m. on the morning of the 2nd, to find no one, so someone suggested the Downey gang had moved to the party at the bunkhouse nearby at the Williams Ranch. At the party, the Downey gang was not to be found. Yet, somehow a fight broke out between the party goers and the 38th street gang. The fight was brief, ending when someone yelled the police were coming. In the aftermath of the fight, the party-throwers, the Delgadillos, discovered the body of José Díaz along the road, who had left the party shortly before the 38th street group arrived. His pockets were turned inside out. He was rushed to a hospital where he died an hour and a half after admission, with a concussion and two stab wounds. The circumstances around Díaz's death still remain undetermined.

=== The People v. Zammora et al. ===
In the process of investigating the murder of José Díaz, hundreds of young men and women in the L.A. area were brought in for police processing. Among the suspects arrested, several were severely beaten during questioning, including Henry Leyvas, Lupe Leyvas, Benny Alvarez, and Eugene Carpio, and Manuel Reyes. Twenty-two men were placed on trial as a group, under the defense of seven attorneys in the People v. Zammora et al. George Shibley later joined as an attorney on the case, winning favor from the defendants and their families for his attempts to communicate in Spanish. Alice McGrath was hired by Shibley to take notes on the trial. Though the murder weapon was never produced, after six days of deliberation, only five of the twenty-two young men were found "not guilty." The other seventeen young men were convicted of murdering José Díaz, including Henry Leyvas, who with José Ruíz and Robert Telles, was convicted of murder in the first degree and two counts of assault with a deadly weapon with intent to kill. Leyvas, Ruíz, and Telles were sentenced to life in prison, while the other young men were sentenced to one to five years.

The ruling was reversed in October 1944 and the men were released, due to the efforts of the Sleepy Lagoon Defense Committee, with Alice McGrath as executive secretary. However, many of the young men returned to prison, including Henry Leyvas.

=== The Zoot Suit Riots ===
With rising tension between the zoot suiters and military servicemen in the L.A. area, what is known as the Zoot Suit Riots began on June 3, 1943 when a group of sailors claimed to have been robbed and beaten by Pachuco. Servicemen beat zoot suit wearing civilians with clubs and other makeshift weapons, and stripped them of their suits. Approximately ninety-four civilians and eighteen servicemen were treated for serious injuries, with all of the ninety four arrested, but only two of the servicemen. One source claims the Riot continued for five nights, when military and police ended the violence. However, a second source states that the span of the Riots was nine days.

== Production history ==
=== Stage debut ===
Zoot Suit premiered at The Mark Taper Forum in Los Angeles on April 20, 1978. This production with Center Theatre Group marked the first professionally produced Chicano play. The initial ten-day run in April sold out in two days. An audience of season ticket holders and local Mexican-Americans gave standing ovations each evening of the performances at the Mark Taper Forum. A second run began in August and tickets sold out yet again. This extended run was held at the Aquarius Theatre, Los Angeles.

=== Broadway production ===
The Broadway production debuted at the Winter Garden Theater on March 25, 1979, and closed on April 29 after 41 performances and 17 previews. The production was directed by Luis Valdez and featured choreography by Patricia Birch. Edward James Olmos' portrayal of El Pachuco earned him a Tony Award nomination for best featured actor in a play, as well as a Theatre World award. Zoot Suit was the second Latino written and directed play produced on Broadway, coming second only to Miguel Piñero's Short Eyes in 1974. While Short Eyes won two Obie Awards, as well as the New York Drama Critics' Circle Award for Best American Play, Zoot Suit ran a mere five weeks on Broadway.

Valdez also directed a filmed version of the play, combining stage and film techniques.

=== 30th anniversary production ===
In April 2008, Alma Martinez, member of the original 1978 cast of Zoot Suit directed the 30 year anniversary production at Pomona College in Claremont, California. This was the first time since its stage debut in 1978 that Zoot Suit had been produced in the Los Angeles area. The two-week run managed to sell out prior to opening night, despite minimal advertisement, primarily in Latino publications. Many outreach opportunities were taken, including an alumni night, a staff appreciation performance, matinees allowing over 1,000 high school students to attend, and the development of a study guide for students attending the performances.

The alumni event featured a reunion of original 1978 cast members, as well as members of the film version of Zoot Suit. Luis Valdez and Alice McGrath, the community activist on whom Valdez based the character Alice, were given awards. Also in the audience were members of the family of Henry Leyvas, on whom Henry Reyna was based.

In casting the revival, Martinez cast across the Claremont University Consortium in search of Latino students. All of the Chicano roles featured actors making their stage debut, and the majority of the cast was composed of non-theatre majors. Assistant director Shakina Nayfack modified the script to reduce homophobic and sexist language where possible. Martinez cast a female in the traditionally male role of the Press.

=== Center Theatre Group’s 50th Anniversary ===
As part of the Center Theatre Group's 50th Anniversary celebration, playwright and director Luis Valdez brought Zoot Suit to the Mark Taper Forum from January 31 to April 2, 2017. The play featured Rose Portillo and Daniel Valdez, who were original cast members from the 1978 production. Instead of reprising their roles of Henry Reyna and Della, respectively, they returned to the stage to play the roles of Henry Reyna's parents. Rose Portillo was delighted to bring Zoot Suit to new audiences and stated, “I’m over the moon. It was a dream come true the first time. It’s a dream come true the second time, to come full circle and to work with Luis at the Taper, where Gordon Davidson and Luis were so influential on my artistic career. I’m looking forward to sharing Zoot Suit with a whole new crop of artists and audiences.” Similarly, Daniel Valdez said, “It’s great to come back to where it all started 38 years ago. I’m looking forward to inhabiting the world of Zoot Suit once again.” Academy Award nominated actor Demián Bichir also starred as El Pachuco and Mexican American actor Matias Ponce played Henry Reyna.

== Criticism ==
Zoot Suit was well received in its initial production in Los Angeles. In his review for Theatre Journal, Jules Aaron laudes the play for its ability to both entertain and make a political statement. Aaron also notes the emotional content of the play. Richard Eder for The New York Times echoed Aaron's observations that the play is both entertaining and political. He adds that Zoot Suit is a blend of Cantinflas and Brecht. Eder adds his critique that the play is too specific to the Chicano community and lacks universality.

Valdez's play did not receive the same feelings in New York City when it made its Broadway debut. Richard Eder voiced a different opinion of the Broadway staging from when he saw the production in L.A. Eder notes that the design elements lacked harmony, and that Zoot Suit failed to combine entertainment with symbolism, plot, and moral. A week later, a New York Times review by Walter Kerr criticizes Valdez for his use of clichés. Kerr also complains of the lack of emotional connection between Daniel Valdez and Miss Hensel, who play Henry and Alice, respectively.

== Music ==
The songs threaded through Zoot Suit were written by Lalo Guerrero and the playwright's brother Daniel Valdez. Guerrero, known as the father of Chicano music, wrote music detailing the Chicano culture during World War II, resulting in the feature of the songs in Zoot Suit. The music combines boogie-woogie and El Paso's version of R&B.
