= Catherine Black (actress) =

Canadian-American film, TV, and stage actor and film director

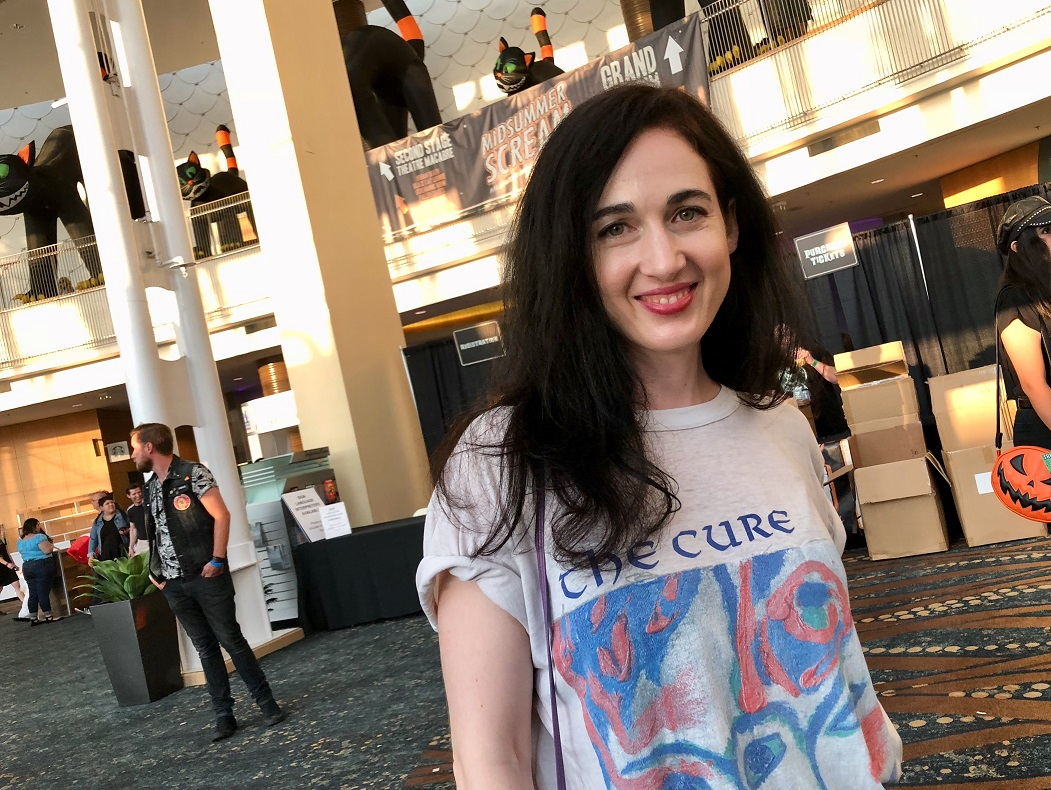
- Black at Midsummer Scream 2018
- Born: Toronto, Ontario, Canada
- Occupations: Actor, film director, screenwriter, artist
- Known for: American Psycho, Odyssey 5, The Donner Party, Star Trek: Strange New Worlds

Catherine Black is a Canadian–American actor, director, screenwriter and artist. Black is known for starring opposite Peter Weller in an episode of the science fiction Showtime series, Odyssey 5, playing Vanden, opposite Christian Bale, in the 2000 cult thriller American Psycho, directed by Mary Harron, and starring with Crispin Glover in the 2009 period drama, The Donner Party. Black won a Best Actress award at the 2014 Madrid International Film Festival for her performance in De Puta Madre A Love Story, a short film that she also wrote and directed. The short film was also nominated for a Best Story and Best Short Film. Black is a member of the Alliance of Women Directors.

== Life and career ==
Black was born in Toronto, Ontario, Canada and now lives in Los Angeles, California.

Black's stage debut was at the age of 16 as Juliet in a production of Romeo and Juliet directed by Lewis Baumander. Black went on to star in several Dora Award-winning Theatre productions including Walls of Africa (Theatre Passe Muraille), Crimes (Berkeley Street Theatre-Canadian Stage Company), and The Human Zoo (Factory Theatre Mainspace).

Black has appeared in films and TV series such as Star Trek: Strange New Worlds, Playing House, Highlander: The Raven, In a Heartbeat, Blue Murder, Show Me Yours, Loser, and Stay Cool. Black has studied and performed at the Upright Citizens Brigade. After studying there for many years, Black is an acting teacher at Stuart Rogers Studios, Los Angeles.

Black wrote and directed Girl Trip, a dark comedy that took home five awards, acquired worldwide SVOD/VOD distribution and is streaming with Etheria Anthology season 6 episode 12. Catherine was hired to direct Like Nothing Happened that won Best Drama at the 2021 Rock The Shorts Film Festival.

Black is a classically trained singer who studied at The Royal Conservatory of Music. She is also a self-taught classical painter, and has exhibited her collection, "Benevolence", at The Engine Gallery in Toronto.
