= Alma Martinez (actress) =

American actress

Alma Martinez Carranza
- Born: March 18, 1953 (age 73); Monclova, Coahuila, Mexico
- Education: Stanford University (Ph.D.), University of Southern California (M.F.A., acting), Whittier College (B.A., theatre)
- Occupations: Actor, Director, Professor
- Years active: 1980–present
- Website: Official website

Alma Martinez (born 18 March 1953) is a Mexican-American actress, stage director, and professor of theatre. She is best known for her roles in film and television shows including the Peabody Award winning drama series The Bridge with Demián Bichir and Diane Kruger and Corridos: Tales of Passion & Revolution with Linda Ronstadt as well as performances on Broadway, Off-Broadway, regional theatre, Mexican and European stages.

== Early life and career ==
In 1979, Martinez joined the Center Theatre Group production of Luis Valdez’s Zoot Suit. Her film debut was in Valdez's 1981 adaptation, the American classic Zoot Suit, launching a career that led to her induction into the Academy of Motion Picture Arts and Sciences in 2013. She has since been the lead actress in many of Valdez's projects in a collaboration that has spanned over 30 years. Australian director Fred Schepisi cast her in his American film debut, Barbarosa with Willie Nelson and Gary Busey. This was followed by Under Fire with Nick Nolte, Gene Hackman, Ed Harris and Jean Louis Trintignant. Martinez made a notable Broadway debut in In the Summer House directed by Joanne Akalaitis featuring Dianne Wiest, Frances Conroy and Liev Schreiber.

== Academic career ==
Following her PhD in drama from Stanford, in 2001 she became an assistant professor in the Theater and Dance Department at University of California, Santa Cruz. She became an associate professor with tenure in 2006, before moving to Pomona College. From 2006 until 2013, she was an assistant professor at Pomona College. Following a controversial tenure denial, that was settled out of court in 2015, she became an artist-in-residence at the University of La Verne. Subsequently, she became an associate professor of theatre at the University of La Verne.

== Film and television ==
Martinez has appeared in over 20 features and independent films including Born in East L.A. with Cheech Marin, For Greater Glory with Andy Garcia and Oscar Isaac, Strike One with Danny Trejo as well as Cake with Jennifer Aniston and Batman v Superman: Dawn of Justice. Her voiceover work includes the award-winning documentaries The Panama Deception and Food Chains. In 2017 she appeared as Rodney Alcala's mother Anna Alcala in the television film Dating Game Killer.

== Theatre ==
Martinez has performed in over 100 major productions in the US, Mexico and Europe in venues that include the Vivian Beaumont Theatre, Joyce Theatre, Mark Taper Forum, Oregon Shakespeare Festival, Pasadena Playhouse, Berkeley Repertory Theatre, Sundance Theatre Program, San Diego Repertory Theatre, Santa Cruz Shakespeare festival, South Coast Repertory Theatre, Arizona Theatre Company, Pennsylvania Stage, San Diego Repertory Theatre, Denver Center Theatre Company, Teatro Juan Ruiz De Alarcon (Mexico City), Teatro Calderon (Zacatecas, Mexico), Teatro Greco (Taormina, Italy), Castello Sforesco (Milan, Italy), Festival De Sant Arcangelo (Italy), Teatro Romano (Fiesolo, Italy), Oktoberfest (Munich, Germany) and Neiuwe Scene (Antwerp, Belgium), among others.

== Filmography ==
=== Film ===
Year	Title	Role	Note(s)
1981	Zorro: The Gay Blade		ADR
1981	Zoot Suit	Lupe	
1982	The Border		ADR
1982	Barbarosa	Juanita	
1983	Blue Thunder		ADR
1983	Under Fire	Isela	
1983	Trial by Terror	Diane Johnson	
1985	Graffiti		ADR; short; uncredited
1987	Born in East L.A.	Gloria	
1987	Down Twisted		ADR
1987	A Good and Perfect Gift: A Christmas Story		
1988	The Milagro Beanfield War		ADR; uncredited
1991	Dolly Dearest	Alva	
1994	It Could Happen to You	Juror	Uncredited
1994	Of Love and Shadows		ADR
1995	The Novice	Teresa's Mother	
2000	Jacarenda		Short
2000	Ballad of a Soldier	Mother	
2001	Prozac Nation	Professor	Uncredited
2004	Most High	Nurse In Hall	
2005	Planting Melvin	Caroline Lawrence	
2009	Crossing Over	Mexican Woman In Dress Factory	
2012	For Greater Glory: The True Story of Cristiada	Mrs. Vargas Gonzales	
2014	Destiny		Short
2014	Cake	Irma	
2014	Strike One	Mrs. Garcia	
2014	Selling Rosario	Tia	Short
2015	Healer	Francisca	Short
2015	Ouroboros	Zulma	Short
2016	Stevie D	Senator Garcia	
2016	Batman v Superman: Dawn of Justice	Older Goat Herder	
2016	Transpecos	Marisa	
2016	The Darkness	Teresa Morales	
2016	1st Strike	Mrs. Garcia	
2017	Abuelita	Jasmine	Short
2018	Where the Water Runs	Maria	
2018	Cucuy: The Boogeyman	Blanca	
2019	Ms. Purple	Juanita	
2019	Clemency	Ms. Jimenez	
2019	Don't Say No	Christie's Grandmother	
2020	Getting From Here		Short
2021	Tyger Tyger	Doctor Rosa	
2024	A Little Family Drama	Anselma	

=== Television ===
Year	Title	Role	Note(s)
1980	The Righteous Apples	Pregnant Teen	
1982	General Hospital	Sharon Garcia	
1982	American Playhouse	Anastacia	Episode: "Seguin"
1982	Scamps	Susan Alvarez	TV movie
1983	Rubik, the Amazing Cube	(voice)	
1983	Lottery!		Episode: "Los Angeles: Bigger Volume"
1984	Whiz Kids	Isabel	Episode: "Maid in the USA"
1984	Blue Thunder		ADR; Episode: "Skydiver"
1984	St. Elsewhere	Angela	Episode: "Breathless"
1985	The Twilight Zone	Teresa Rojas	Episode: "Wordplay/Dreams for Sale/Chameleon"
1985	Toughlove	Doctor	Uncredited; TV movie
1985-1987	Santa Barbara	Dora	2 episodes
1986	Dress Gray	Hedge's Secretary	Miniseries; 2 episodes
1987	Superior Court	Attorney	Episode: "Assuming the Identity"
1987	Corridos: Tales of Passion & Revolution	Elisabeta	TV movie
1989	Miami Vice		ADR; Episode: "To Have and to Hold"
1990-1991	The New Adam-12	Sergeant Elizabeth Cruz	9 episodes
1991	The Boys	Therapist	TV movie
1991	The Gambler Returns: The Luck of the Draw	Sonora Sue	TV movie
1991	Dark Justice		ADR; 2 episodes
1991	In a Child's Name	Sorayda	miniseries; uncredited
1992	Quiet Killer	Dolores	TV movie
1992	FBI: The Untold Stories		Episode: "Border Kill"
1994	Shattered Image	Gloria's Mother	TV movie
1995	500 Nations		Episode: "Mexico"
1995	Wings		ADR; Episode: "Gone But Not Faygotten"
1996	Nash Bridges	Jan	Episode: "Key Witness"
2007	The Unit	Yolanda	Episode: "Paradise Lost"
2013	The Bridge	Garciela Rivera	6 episodes
2013	Welcome to the Family	Principal Ortiz	Episode: "Pilot"
2014	Rake	Prosecutor	Episode: "Man's Best Friend"
2016	American Crime Story	Family Court Judge	Episode: "Marcia, Marcia, Marcia"
2016	Grey's Anatomy	Socorro Diaz	Episode: "At Last"
2016-2020	Elena of Avalor	Lady Yolanda (voice)	4 episodes
2016	Queen Sugar	Raquel "Rocky" Ortiz	Episode: "First Things First"
2016	Good Behavior	Conchita Pereira	Episode: "The Ballad of Little Santino"
2017	I Love Dick	Leti	Episode: "A Short History of Weird Girls"
2017	The Last Man on Earth	La Abuela	Episode: "La Abuela"
2017	The Dating Game Killer	Anna Alcala	TV movie
2018	Left for Dead	Ms. Ruiz	TV movie
2019	MacGyver	Abuela	Episode: "Father + Bride + Betrayal"
2019	Strante Angel	Alvarita Lopez	Episode: "The Magus"
2019	Sister of the Bride	Clara	TV movie
2019	The Terror	Abuela Rocio Trujillo	4 episodes
2019	Vampirina	Abuela (voice)	Episode: "Dia de los Muertos/As You Wish"
