= Cumbre Vieja tsunami hazard =

Potential natural disaster

Location of Cumbre Vieja in the North Atlantic Ocean.

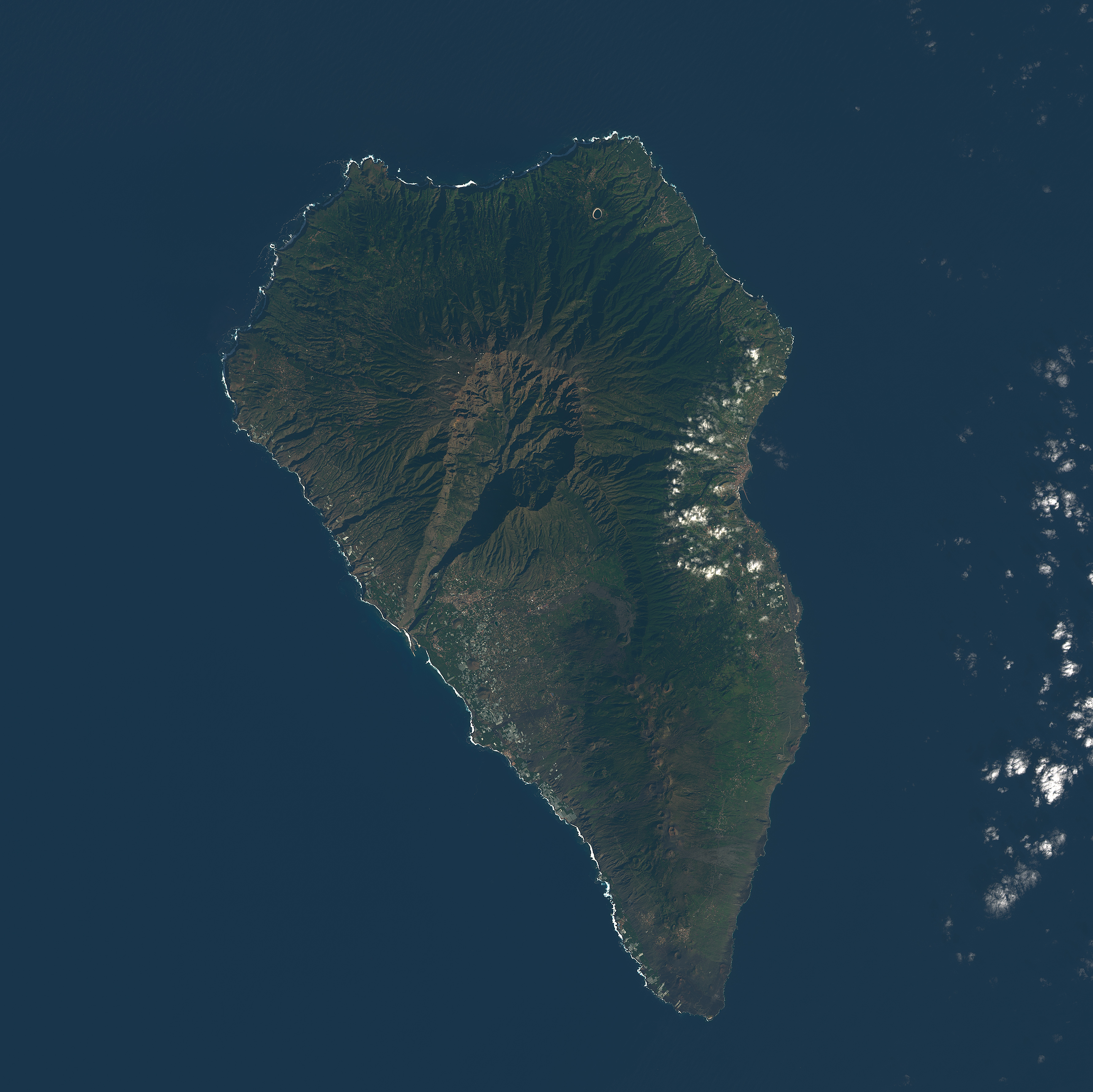
The island of La Palma in the Atlantic Ocean

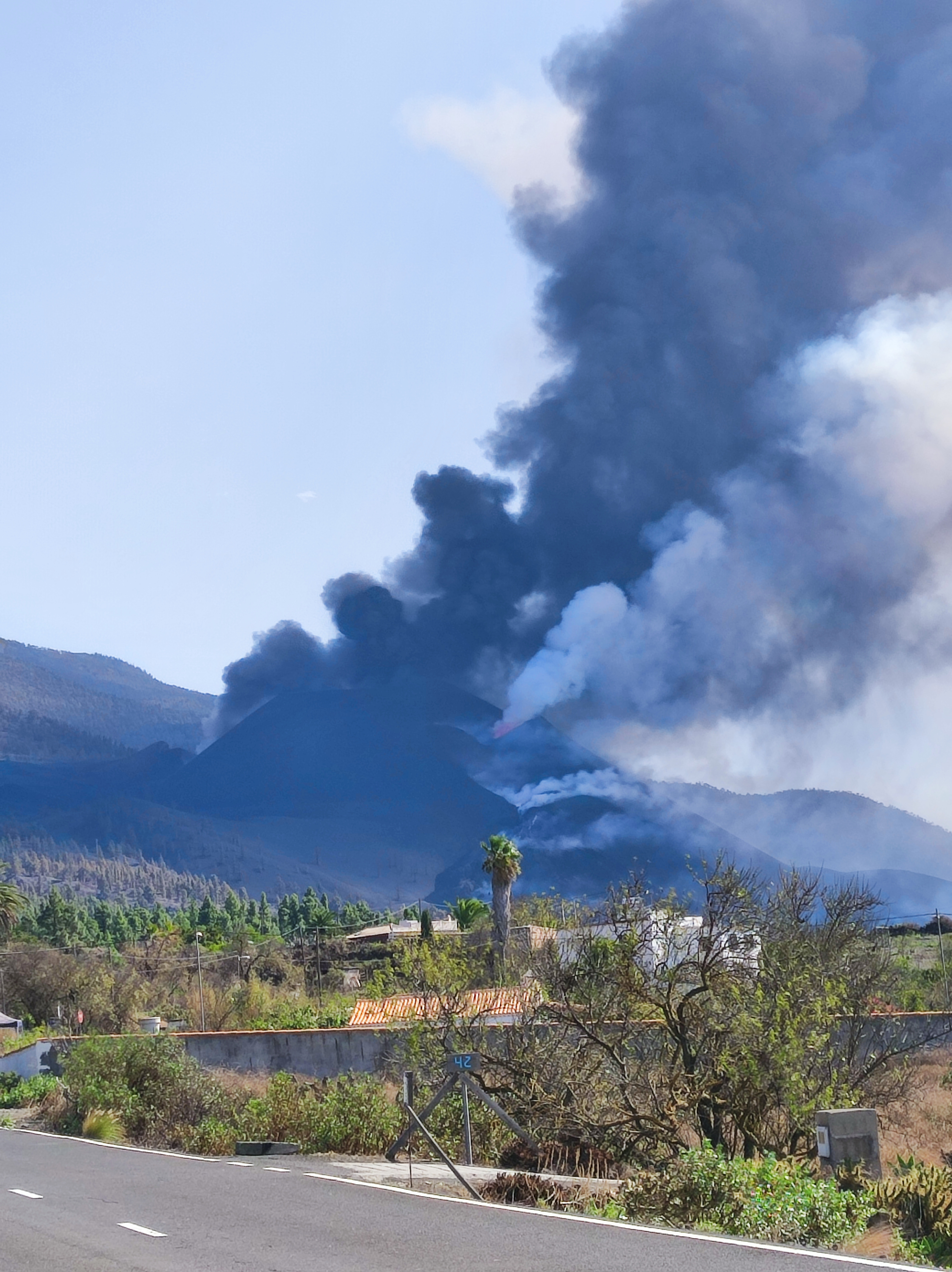
2021 Cumbre Vieja volcanic eruption

The Cumbre Vieja tsunami hazard refers to the risk that a volcanic eruption on the island of La Palma, Canary Islands, Spain, could cause a large landslide triggering a megatsunami in the Atlantic Ocean. Volcanic islands and volcanoes on land frequently undergo large landslides/collapses, which have been documented in Hawaii for example. A recent example is Anak Krakatau, which collapsed to cause the 2018 Sunda Strait tsunami.

Steven N. Ward and Simon Day in a 2001 research article proposed that a Holocene change in the eruptive activity of Cumbre Vieja volcano and a fracture on the volcano that formed during an eruption in 1949 may be the prelude to a giant collapse. They estimated that such a collapse could cause tsunamis across the entire North Atlantic and severely impact areas as far away as North America. Later research has debated whether the tsunami would still have a significant size far away from La Palma, as the tsunami wave may quickly decay in height away from the source and interactions with the continental shelves could further reduce its size.

Evidence indicates that most collapses in the Canary Islands took place as multistage events that are not as effective at creating tsunamis, and a multi-stage collapse at La Palma likewise would result in smaller tsunamis. The recurrence rate of similar collapses is extremely low, about one every 100,000 years or less in the case of the Canary Islands. Recent eruptions, including the 2021 event, did not result in a collapse. Other volcanoes across the world are at risk of causing such tsunamis.

== Sector collapses and tsunamis caused by them ==
Giant landslides and collapses of ocean island volcanoes were first described in 1964 in Hawaii and are now known to happen in almost every ocean basin. As volcanoes grow in size they eventually become unstable and collapse, generating landslides and collapses such as the failure of Mount St. Helens in 1980 and many others. In the Hawaiian Islands, collapses with volumes of over 5,000 cubic kilometres (1,200 cu mi) have been identified.

A number of such landslides have been identified in the Canary Islands, especially in the more active volcanoes El Hierro, La Palma and Tenerife where about 14 such events are recorded through their deposits. They mostly take the form of debris flows with volumes of 50–200 cubic kilometres (12–48 cu mi) that emanate from an amphitheatre-shaped depression on the volcanic island and come to rest on the seafloor at 3,000–4,000 metres (9,800–13,100 ft) depth. They do not appear to form through individual collapses; multi-stage failures lasting hours or days appear to be more common as has been inferred from the patterns of landslide-generated turbidite deposits in the Agadir Basin north of the Canary Islands. The most recent such event took place at El Hierro originally dated at 15,000 years ago but later re-dated to have occurred between 87,000±8,000 (margin of uncertainty) and 39,000±13,000 years ago.

Many processes are involved in the onset of volcano instability and the eventual failure of the edifice. Mechanisms that destabilize volcanic edifices to the point of collapse include inflation and deflation of magma chambers during the entry of new magma, intrusion of cryptodomes and dykes, and instability of slopes under loading from lava flows and oversteepened lava domes. Periodic collapses have been found at some volcanoes, such as at Augustine and Volcan de Colima. Shield volcanoes have different mechanical properties than stratovolcanoes as well as flatter slopes and undergo larger collapses than the latter. Finally, the mechanical stability both of the volcanic edifice and the underlying basement and the influence of climate and sea level changes play a role in volcano stability.

=== Tsunami hazards ===
Large collapses on volcanoes have generated tsunamis, of which about 1% relates to volcanic collapse; both small collapses and earthquake-linked landslides that took place in historical times generated tsunamis. The 1998 Papua New Guinea earthquake in particular drew attention to this hazard. The most recent such tsunami is the 2018 Sunda Strait tsunami, which was caused by a flank collapse of Anak Krakatau and caused at least 437 fatalities. The possibility of a large collapse of this volcano causing a tsunami was known already before the 2018 event, and the disaster drew attention to the dangers associated with non-earthquake tsunamis.

Other historically recorded examples include the 1929 Grand Banks earthquake, the 1958 Lituya Bay tsunami, numerous tsunamis at Stromboli including a 2002 tsunami that caused severe damage to coastal settlements, the 1888 tsunami caused by the Ritter Island collapse which killed about 3,000 people and is the largest historical tsunami-forming collapse with a volume of 5 cubic kilometres (1.2 cu mi), and the 1792 Shimabara collapse of Unzen volcano in Japan which claimed approximately 15,000 victims. In total, volcanically generated tsunamis are responsible for about 20% of all fatalities related to volcanic eruptions.

Prehistoric landslides that caused tsunamis include the Storegga Slide 8,200 years ago, a 3,000 cubic kilometres (720 cu mi) submarine landslide off Norway that generated a tsunami recorded from geological evidence in the Faroe Islands, Norway and Scotland. The landslide has been modelled as a retrogressive failure that moved at a rate of 25–30 metres per second (82–98 ft/s). Another landslide-induced tsunami inundated Santiago, Cape Verde, 73,000 years ago after a collapse of the neighbouring Fogo volcano. More controversial is the evidence of past landslide-induced tsunamis at Kohala and Lanai in the Hawaiian Islands and at Gran Canaria in the Canary Islands, and other candidate deposits of landslide-induced tsunamis have been reported from Bermuda, Eleuthera, Mauritius, Rangiroa and Stromboli.

The size of such tsunamis depends both on the geological details of the landslide (such as its Froude number) and also on assumptions about the hydrodynamics of the model used to simulate tsunami generation, thus they have a large margin of uncertainty. Generally, landslide-induced tsunamis decay more quickly with distance than earthquake-induced tsunamis, as the former, often having a dipole structure at the source, tend to spread out radially and has a shorter wavelength (the rate at which a wave loses energy is inversely proportional to its wavelength, in other words the longer the wavelength of a wave, the slower it loses energy) while the latter disperses little as it propagates away perpendicularly to the source fault. Testing whether a given tsunami model is correct is complicated by the rarity of giant collapses. The term "megatsunami" has been defined by media and has no precise definition, although it is commonly taken to refer to tsunamis over 100 metres (330 ft) high.

== Regional context: Cumbre Vieja and the Atlantic Ocean ==
The Cumbre Vieja volcano lies on the southern third of La Palma (Canary Islands) and rises about 2 kilometres (1.2 mi) above sea level and 6 kilometres (3.7 mi) above the seafloor. It is the fastest growing volcano in the archipelago and thus dangerous in terms of collapses and landslides. Several collapses took place since the Pliocene, followed by the growth of Cumbre Vieja during the last 125,000 years. The latest eruption began on 19 September 2021 following a week of seismic activity.

During the Holocene volcanic activity on Cumbre Vieja has become concentrated along a north–south axis, which may reflect an incipient detachment fault under the volcano. During the 1949 eruption a 4 kilometres (2.5 mi) long normal fault developed along the crest of Cumbre Vieja; it has been inactive since then and prior eruptions did not form such faults, which do not have the appearance of graben faults. Geodesy has not identified ongoing movement of the flank. Unlike on Hawaii, flank movements at Canary Islands appear to occur mainly during volcanic episodes.

Tsunamis are less common in the Atlantic Ocean than in the Pacific or the Indian oceans, but they have been observed e.g. after the 1755 Lisbon earthquake. Apart from fault lines, submarine volcanoes such as Kick'em Jenny and landslides are sources of tsunamis in the Atlantic. Tsunamis are not unique to the sea; a landslide in the Vajont Dam in 1963 caused a megatsunami resulting in around 2000 fatalities, and evidence of past tsunamis is recorded from Lake Tahoe.

== Models ==
=== Model by Ward and Day 2001 ===
Ward and Day 2001 estimated that the unstable part of Cumbre Vieja would be at least 15 kilometres (9.3 mi) wide in north–south direction. In light of the behaviour of other documented sector collapses such as at Mount St. Helens, the headscarp of the unstable part of Cumbre Vieja is likely 2–3 kilometres (1.2–1.9 mi) east from the 1949 fault and the toe of the sector lies at 1–3 kilometres (0.62–1.86 mi) depth below sea level. Bathymetric observations west of La Palma support this interpretation. They had not enough information with which to estimate the thickness of the block but assumed that it would have a volume of about 150–500 cubic kilometres (36–120 cu mi) and the shape of a wedge, comparable to the Cumbre Nueva giant landslide 566,000 years ago also on La Palma.

The authors used linear wave theory to estimate the tsunami induced by the simulated Cumbre Vieja. They used a scenario of a collapse of 500 cubic kilometres (120 cu mi) that moves at a rate of about 100 metres per second (330 ft/s) on top of a layer of mud or landslide breccia, which lubricate its movement, and eventually spreads 60 kilometres (37 mi) to cover a jug-shaped area of 3,500 square kilometres (1,400 sq mi). Ignoring that the landslide excavates part of the flank of Cumbre Vieja, thus assuming that it does not contribute to any tsunami generation, they estimated the following timing of the tsunami:

- 2 minutes: A 900 metres (3,000 ft) thick dome of water rises above the landslide.
- 5 minutes: The dome collapses to a height of 500 metres (1,600 ft) as it advances by 50 kilometres (31 mi); additionally, wave valleys form.
- 10 minutes: The landslide is now over. Waves reaching heights of 400–600 metres (1,300–2,000 ft) hit the three western Canary Islands.
- 15–60 minutes: 50–100 metres (160–330 ft) high waves hit Africa. A 500 kilometres (310 mi) wide train of waves advances across the Atlantic.
- 3–6 hours: The waves hit South America and Newfoundland, reaching heights of 15–20 metres (49–66 ft) and 10 metres (33 ft), respectively. Spain and England are partially protected by La Palma, thus tsunami waves there only reach 5–7 metres (16–23 ft).
- 9 hours: Waves 20–25 metres (66–82 ft) approach Florida; they are not expected to grow farther as they hit the coast.

France and the Iberian Peninsula would be affected as well. Further, the authors concluded that the size of the tsunami roughly scales with the product of the landslide speed and its volume. They suggested that traces of past such tsunamis may be found in the southeastern United States, on the continental shelf, in northeast Brazil, in the Bahamas, western Africa.

=== Later models ===
Mader 2001 employed a shallow water code that includes friction and the Coriolis force. Assuming shallow-water behaviour of the wave even with runup the eventual tsunami heights in the US and the Caribbean would not exceed 3 metres (9.8 ft) and in Africa and Europe it would not be higher than 10 metres (33 ft). Mader 2001 also estimated that dispersion along the US coast could reduce tsunami amplitude to less than 1 metre (3 ft 3 in).

Gisler, Weaver and Gittings 2006 used public domain bathymetric information and the so-called "SAGE hydrocode" to simulate the tsunami stemming from variously shaped landslides. The landslides generate a single wave that eventually detaches from the landslide as the latter slows down. The waves have shorter wavelengths and periods than teletsunamis and thus do not spread as effectively as the latter away from the source and decay away roughly with the inverse of the distance. Such tsunamis would be a greater danger to the Canary Islands, the eastern Lesser Antilles, Iberia, Morocco and northeastern South America than to North America where they would be only a few centimetres high.

Løvholt, Pedersen and Gisler in 2008 published another study that employed the worst-case landslide scenario of Ward and Day 2001, but used hydrodynamic modelling that accounts for dispersion, non-linear effects and the deformation of the landslide material itself to simulate waves generated by such a collapse. In this model, the landslide had a volume of 375 cubic kilometres (90 cu mi) and a maximum speed of 190 metres per second (620 ft/s). It generates a high leading wave that eventually separates from the landslide, while turbulent flow behind the slide generates lower waves. Overall, a complex wave field develops with a sickle-shaped front wave that is over 100 metres (330 ft) high when it reaches a radius of 100 kilometres (62 mi). The waves do not decay at a constant rate with distance, with the crestal wave decaying slightly faster than 1/distance while the trailing wave decays slightly more slowly. Thus at distance the trailing waves can become higher than the leading wave, especially the waves propagating west display this behaviour. Undulating bores also develop, a factor not commonly considered in tsunami models.

In the Løvholt, Pedersen and Gisler 2008 model, the impact in the Canary Islands would be quite severe, with the tsunami reaching heights of over 10–188 metres (33–617 ft), threatening even inland valleys and towns and hitting the two largest cities of the islands (Santa Cruz and Las Palmas) badly. The impact in Florida would not be as severe as in the Ward and Day 2001 model by a factor of 2–3 but wave heights of several metres would still occur around the North Atlantic. Off the US coast, wave amplitude would reach 9.6 metres (31 ft).

Abadie et al. 2009 simulated both the most realistic landslide geometry and the tsunamis that would result from it near its source. They concluded that most realistic volumes would be 38–68 cubic kilometres (9.1–16.3 cu mi) for a small collapse and 108–130 cubic kilometres (26–31 cu mi) for a large collapse. The initial height of the wave depends strongly on the viscosity of the landslide and can exceed 1.3 kilometres (0.81 mi).

Løvholt, Pedersen and Glimsdal 2010 noted that landslide-generated tsunamis can have a leading wave smaller than following waves, requiring a dispersive wave model. They simulated inundation in Cádiz resulting from a 375 cubic kilometres (90 cu mi) collapse at La Palma. The found runup of about 20 metres (66 ft) and the possible development of undular bores.

Abadie, Harris and Grilli 2011 employed three-dimensional simulations with the hydrodynamic simulator "THETIS" to reproduce the tsunamis induced by failures of 20 cubic kilometres (4.8 cu mi), 40 cubic kilometres (9.6 cu mi), 80 cubic kilometres (19 cu mi) and 450 cubic kilometres (110 cu mi). These volumes were taken from studies on the stability of La Palma's western flank, while the 450 cubic kilometres (110 cu mi) reflects worst-case scenarios from earlier tsunami studies at Cumbre Vieja. The landslide is directed southwestward and induces a wave train, with the 80 cubic kilometres (19 cu mi) collapse having a maximum wave height of 80 metres (260 ft). At El Hierro the tsunami can shoal and rise to a height of 100 metres (330 ft), while the wave train surrounds La Palma and continues eastward with a height of 20–30 metres (66–98 ft).

Zhou et al. 2011 used numerical simulations to model various tsunamis, including a scenario resulting from a mass failure at La Palma. It assumes a smaller volume of 365 cubic kilometres (88 cu mi) as the collapse hits only the western flank and does not assume a southwest-directed propagation direction, thus increasing the hazard to the US coast. The resulting tsunami approaches the US coast between 6–8 hours after the collapse, in a north-to-south fashion. Waves grow due to shoaling as they approach the continental shelf but later decline due to increased bottom friction and eventually reach heights of 3–10 metres (9.8–32.8 ft) when they come ashore. The impact of undular bore formation on runup is unclear.

Abadie et al. 2012 simulated both the development of waves using dispersive models that include non-linear effects, and the behaviour of the landslide generating them through slope stability and material strength models. They considered both volumes of 38–68 cubic kilometres (9.1–16.3 cu mi), obtained from research on the stability of the flank of Cumbre Vieja, as well as volumes of 500 cubic kilometres (120 cu mi) as hypothesized by the original Ward and Day 2001 study. The slide has a complex acceleration behaviour and most of the waves are formed during a short period early in the slide where the Froude number briefly exceeds 1; the initial wave can reach a height of 1.3 kilometres (0.81 mi)–0.8 kilometres (0.50 mi) and eventually wave trains are formed, which are diffracted around the southern tip of La Palma and go on to hit the other Canary Islands. With increasing volume of the slides, the wavelength becomes shorter and the amplitude higher, yielding steeper waves. Abadie et al. 2012 estimated a fast decay of the waves with distance but cautioned that since their model was not appropriate to use for simulating far-field wave propagation the decay may be exaggerated. In the Canary Islands, inundation would reach a height of 290 metres (950 ft) on La Palma; even for an 80 cubic kilometres (19 cu mi) slide would reach heights of 100 metres (330 ft) in the city of Santa Cruz de La Palma (population 18,000) while the largest city of La Palma (Los Llanos de Aridane, population 20,000) may be spared. The waves would take approximately one hour to propagate through the archipelago, and important cities in the entire Canary Islands would be hit by substantial tsunamis irrespective of the landslide size.

Tehranirad et al. 2015 modelled the impact both of a worst-case 450 cubic kilometres (110 cu mi) landslide and of a more realistic 80 cubic kilometres (19 cu mi) collapse on Ocean City, Maryland, the surrounding area, Europe, Africa and the Canary Islands, using the "THETIS" and "FUNWAVE-TVD" hydrodynamical models. They found that for a larger volume, the leading wave is both larger and forms farther away from the island. For a volume of 450 cubic kilometres (110 cu mi), the tsunami hits Africa after 1–2 hours, followed by Europe between 2–3 hours, the Central Atlantic between 4–5 hours and the US continental shelf between 7–9 hours. At the continental shelf, the wave train slows down and the number of main waves changes. Bathymetry, such as the presence of submarine topography, alters the behaviour of the wave. In the 450 cubic kilometres (110 cu mi) scenario after slightly over 8 hours from collapse tsunami waves reach the areas offshore the US coast, where their height decays as they traverse the continental shelf. The eventual wave heights at the 5 metres (16 ft) depth contour are about 0–2 metres (0.0–6.6 ft) for the 80 cubic kilometres (19 cu mi) collapse and 1–5 metres (3 ft 3 in – 16 ft 5 in) for the 450 cubic kilometres (110 cu mi) collapse; impact is worst in North Carolina but also New York and Florida are impacted even if refraction around the Hudson River Canyon mitigates the impact in New York City. In Europe, tsunami waves arrive after 1–2 hours; even with a smaller collapse of 80 cubic kilometres (19 cu mi) impact around Porto and Lisbon is severe with waves of 5 metres (16 ft) height, as Europe is closer to La Palma.

Abadie et al. 2020 repeated their 2012 simulations using a model which incorporates viscous behaviour to obtain wave heights in the Atlantic, the Caribbean Sea and Western Europe for landslides with a volume of 20 cubic kilometres (4.8 cu mi), 40 cubic kilometres (9.6 cu mi) and 80 cubic kilometres (19 cu mi). This simulation yields a lower initial wave height (80 metres (260 ft) for the 80 cubic kilometres (19 cu mi) landslide) and a flatter profile of the initial water level disturbance. Wave heights reach 0.15 metres (6 in) in the Bay of Biscay, 0.75 metres (2 ft 6 in) south of Portugal, 0.4–0.25 metres (1 ft 4 in – 10 in) along French coasts, 0.75–0.5 metres (2 ft 6 in – 1 ft 8 in) at Guadeloupe, all for the 80 cubic kilometres (19 cu mi) case. Tsunami heights at Agadir, Essaouira and Sufi exceed 5 metres (16 ft), at Lisbon, Coruna, Porto and Vigo about 2 metres (6 ft 7 in) and along parts of the French coasts 1 metre (3 ft 3 in); in Guadeloupe even a small landslide (20 cubic kilometres (4.8 cu mi)) can lead to widespread inundation.

Li et al. 2024 simulated a displacement of about 200 cubic kilometres (48 cu mi) of water produced by a landslide. Ignoring the effect of landslide momentum, waves in the Americas would be lower than wind-driven waves, 10–20 metres (33–66 ft) in the Canary Islands, several metres at Funchal, Madeira, less than a metre at Lisbon and the British Isles. Doubling the volume only causes a slight increase in tsunami heights in the far-field.

Ward and Day 2006 indicated that the combined effects of several wave trains may amplify the tsunami impact over that of a single wave. Research by Frohlich et al. 2009 on boulders emplaced on Tongatapu endorsed the hypothesis of large landslide-induced tsunamis and Ramalho et al. 2015 identified evidence of a megatsunami, implying a single step collapse, caused by the collapse of Fogo volcano in the Cape Verde islands.

== Criticism ==
The findings of Ward and Day 2001 have gained considerable attention, amplified by increased concerns after the 2004 Indian Ocean earthquake about the hazards posed by tsunamis, and in turn increased awareness of megatsunami risks and phenomena. The tsunami scenario has been used as a plot device in works of fiction, and drew renewed attention and concern during the 2021 Cumbre Vieja volcanic eruption despite the risk being very low.

The coverage of the risk of a collapse gained criticism for exaggeration, in particular the coverage in North American and English media and during the 2021 eruption, as well as critique between scientists. They have triggered debate about their validity and the landslide and wave scenarios employed. Various models with different physical specifications have been used to simulate the waves induced by such a landslide. Later estimates have questioned the assumptions made by Ward and Day 2001, mainly with regards to the following:

- The authors employed a linear tsunami model that may not properly reflect non-linear processes such as wave breaking that could reduce the height of the resulting tsunami by a factor of about 10. Wave dispersion might also act to reduce tsunami height since the wave induced by the Ward and Day 2001 landslide behaves as an intermediate-water depth wave.
- The estimated speed and acceleration of the landslide may be unrealistically high for the slopes it would move on, and thus inadequate to establish effective coupling between the tsunami and the landslide. Later research has found evidence that sufficient speeds have been reached during collapses at other volcanoes.
- The landslide modelled by Ward and Day 2001 may be implausibly thick given the known volumes of Canary Islands mega-landslides, and collapses may have occurred in multiple steps rather than a single failure or may have a smaller volume. The thickness of the landslide is a particular issue, as different estimates have been obtained at various volcanoes. Another issue is whether giant landslides occur as a single step failure (as argued for Hawaiian giant landslides) or multistage failures (as appears to be more common in the Canary Islands) and stacking in turbidite deposits generated by landslides are a reliable indicator that these landslides occurred in piecemeal fashion.

In general, many of these studies have found lower wave heights at distance than the original Ward and Day 2001 paper. There are also questions about the southern limit of the width of the unstable zone, the extreme conditions (a much larger volcano and an intense eruption) necessary to actually cause its movement, about whether creep might stabilize it and about whether it actually exists at all. The 2021 eruption on La Palma did not result in a collapse or landslide, and neither have the numerous previous eruptions of the volcano.

=== Probability ===
Giant landslides are rare events. Humanity has never witnessed enormous collapses on La Palma and there is evidence that the western flank of La Palma is currently stable and a collapse in the near future is unlikely. A worst-case scenario giant landslide like the one modelled by Ward and Day 2001 is a very low probability event, probably much less common than once per 100,000 years which is the probable occurrence rate of large landslides in the Canary Islands. A smaller landslide scenario, which Tehranirad et al. 2015 defined as "extreme credible worst case scenario", has a recurrence rate of about once every 100,000 years. Because of their low incidence probability, the hazard from large flank collapses at La Palma is considered to be low. Return periods are not the only factor involved in estimating risk, as the amount of damage done by an extreme event has to be considered. Globally, the return period of giant landslide-induced tsunamis may exceed one per 10,000 years.

== Potential impact ==
A Cumbre Vieja landslide tsunami may constitute a threat to Brazil, Canada, the Caribbean, Ireland, Morocco, the Northeastern United States, Portugal and the United Kingdom. The impact would not be limited to humans. Aside from the tsunami hazard, the impact of a large collapse on people living on the island would be severe. The communities of El Paso, Fuencaliente, Los Llanos and Tazacorte are located on the unstable block.

== Cinema and TV ==
=== Mega-Tsunami: Wave of Destruction ===
This 2000 documentary, part of the BBC's Horizon series, examines the possibility of a mega-tsunami caused by the collapse of a volcano on La Palma. It focuses on the theory proposed by geologists Simon Day and Bill McGuire in 2001, which suggests that a collapse on La Palma could generate a giant tsunami impacting the US east coast and the Caribbean.

=== CSI: Miami ===
The seventh episode of the third season of CSI: Miami, titled "Crime Wave" and first aired in 2004, is set around a tsunami flooding the US city of Miami after an eruption at Cumbre Vieja. The episode includes a 3D model of the eruption.

=== End Day ===
This 2005 docu-drama by the BBC features a mega-tsunami triggered by the collapse of Cumbre Vieja as the first (and least destructive) of five doomsday scenarios predicted by science. The segment deals mostly with the US government's response to the resulting mega-tsunami, an attempted evacuation of New York City and the impact of the wave against this and other cities in the East Coast of the United States. It does not explore the effects in La Palma itself or other locations.

=== Doomsday Earth: Mega Tsunami ===
This 2011 National Geographic documentary explores the potentially devastating effects of a mega tsunami generated by a massive landslide at the La Palma volcano, looking at how a wave of such magnitude could impact various coastal regions around the Atlantic.

=== La Palma ===
La Palma is a four-episode Norwegian miniseries available on Netflix that tells the story of a Norwegian family on holiday on the island of La Palma over Christmas. Their stay is interrupted when a researcher discovers alarming signs of an imminent volcanic eruption at the Cumbre Vieja volcano, triggering a series of catastrophic events that endanger the island's inhabitants and tourists.

The series, created by Martin Sundland, Lars Gudmestad and Harald Rosenløw-Eeg, is inspired by the actual eruption of the Cumbre Vieja volcano in 2021. Although it takes elements from this event, the plot introduces fictional situations, such as the threat of a megatsunami, to heighten the drama and suspense.

Despite its success in more than 80 countries, La Palma has generated a lot of criticism, especially in Spain. The lack of veracity in the depiction of the facts has been pointed out, especially with regard to the scientific argument, the eruption and the megatsunami, which has been the subject of debate.

== Other volcanoes with such threats ==
Other volcanoes in the world with such landslide risks include:

- Anak Krakatau, which is quickly regrowing after its 2018 collapse.
- Augustine
- Beerenberg
- Fogo and Santo Antão in the Cape Verde islands, although the latter is currently inactive and it is not clear whether the former, which underwent a past such collapse, has reached a critical size again.
- Kick 'em Jenny, a submarine volcano in the Lesser Antilles.
- Kilauea, where a 2,000 cubic kilometres (480 cu mi) mass movement took place in 2000. It was a slow movement but a sudden collapse could hit all of the Pacific Rim.
- Kueishantao
- Etna, has a history of catastrophic collapses, with enormous submarine landslides generating very large tsunamis in the Eastern Mediterranean, and is sliding towards the Mediterranean Sea at an average rate of 14 mm (0.55 in) per year.
- Monte Nuovo on Ischia, which might fail during renewed magmatic activity. Both the landslide itself (on Ischia) and tsunamis (Ischia and the coast of Campania in particular, and the coasts of the Tyrrhenian Sea in general) would be affected.
- Marsili, Palinuro, Magnaghi (it) and Vavilov (it), are large dormant or extinct submarine volcanoes in the Tyrrhenian Sea, whose flanks have collapsed and caused large tsunamis, and their fragile structures risk causing huge landslides and large tsunamis in the future.
- There is little known about the potential for such landslide-induced tsunamis in the Pacific Ocean, except for Hawaii.
- A slump off Pico
- Santorini
- Stromboli
- Tenerife, which in case of a collapse during renewed mafic activity could affect the North Atlantic.
