= Barbara Palvin =

Hungarian model (born 1993)

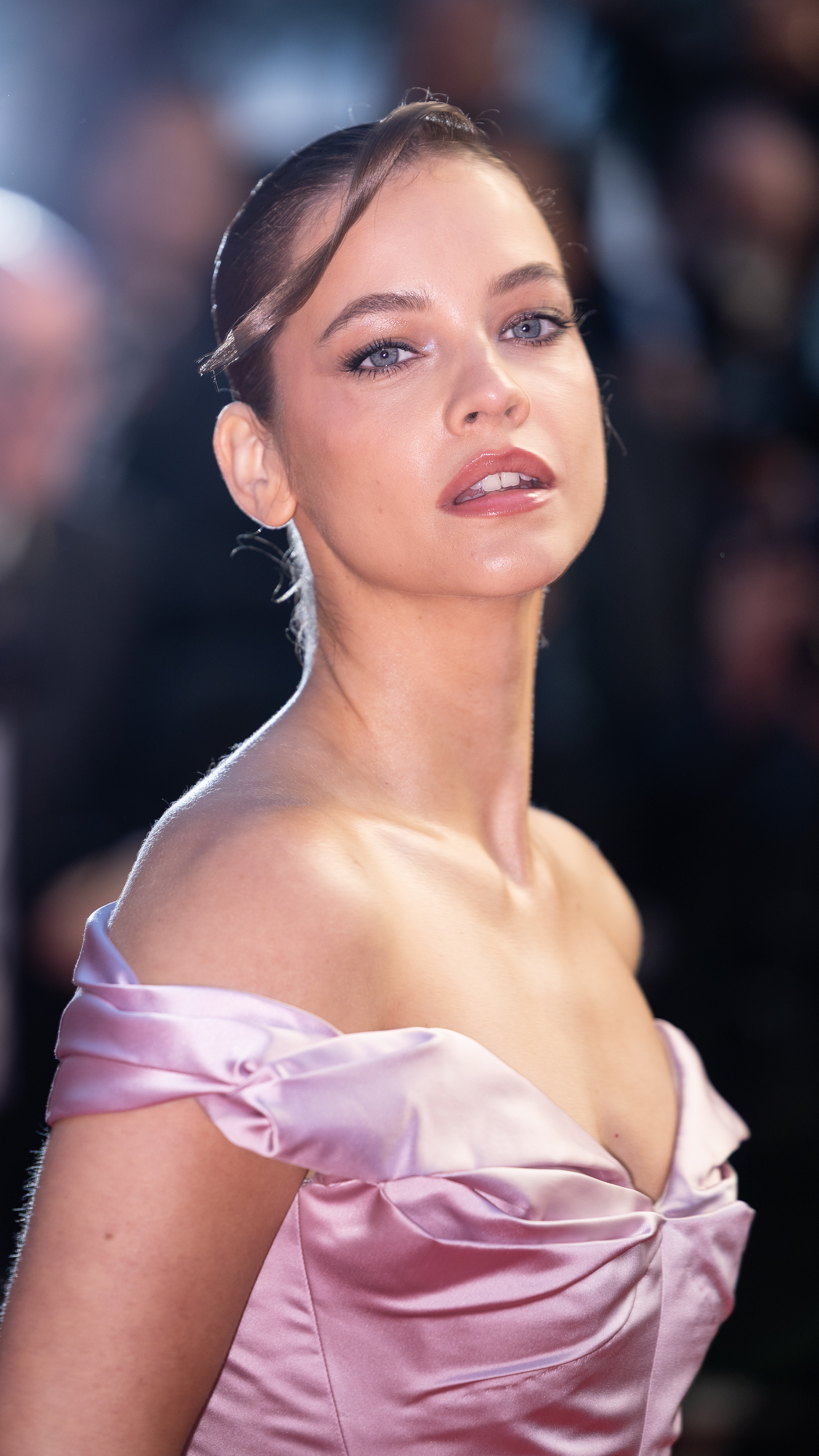
- Palvin at the 2025 Cannes Film Festival
- Born: Palvin Barbara (Note: In Hungarian, surname (Palvin) precedes first name (Barbara).); 8 October 1993 (age 33); Budapest, Hungary
- Other name: Barbara Sprouse
- Years active: 2006–present
- Spouse: Dylan Sprouse (m. 2023)
- Children: 1
- Relatives: Cole Sprouse (brother-in-law)
- Modeling information
- Height: 5 ft 9 in (1.75 m)
- Hair color: Brown
- Eye color: Blue
- Agency: Ford Models (New York, Barcelona, São Paulo); Mirah Management (Paris); Icon Management (Budapest)

Barbara Sprouse (née Palvin; October 8, 1993) is a Hungarian model and actress. She first appeared in the Sports Illustrated Swimsuit Issue in 2016. In 2019, she became a Victoria's Secret Angel, although she first walked in 2012. She is also an ambassador for Longines and Armani Beauty.

== Early life ==
Barbara Palvin was born on 8 October 1993, in Budapest, Hungary. Her family consists of her father, István Palvin; her mother, Ágnes Palvin; and her sister, Anita. Palvin often travelled to the countryside to visit her grandmother and great-grandmother.

== Career ==
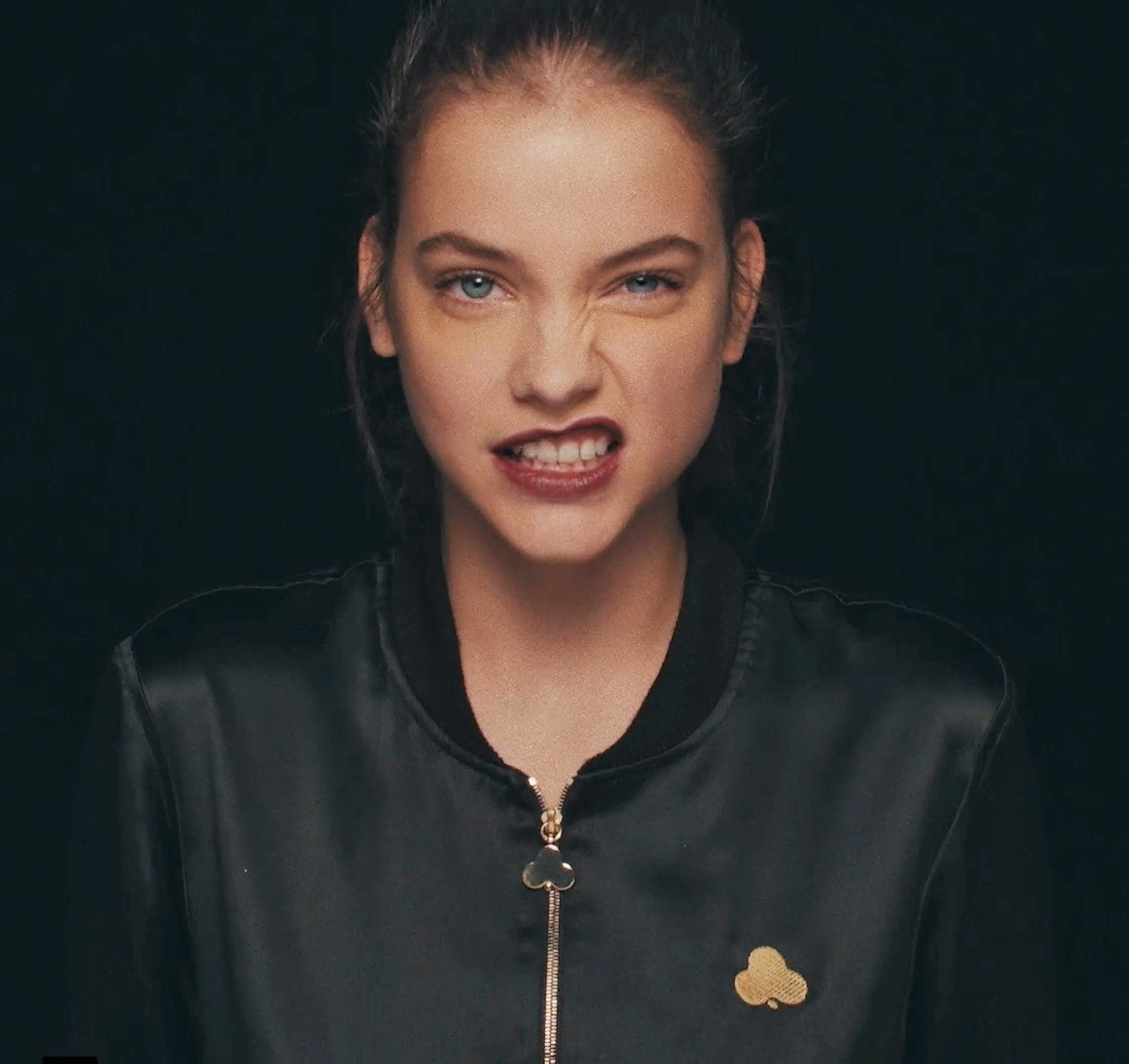
Palvin for Chaos fashion accessory brand

When she was 13, she was discovered on the streets of Budapest by a modeling scout while walking with her mother. She shot her first editorial in 2006 for Spur Magazine, and subsequently moved to Asia where she maintained a steady stream of bookings. Since then, Palvin has been on the cover of L'Officiel, Vogue, Marie Claire, Glamour, Elle, Allure, GQ, Harper's Bazaar, and Numéro. Palvin has appeared in campaigns for Armani Exchange, H&M, Victoria's Secret, and Pull & Bear.

Her runway debut was for Prada during Milan Fashion Week in February 2010. Palvin has also walked for Louis Vuitton, Miu Miu, Nina Ricci, Emanuel Ungaro, Christopher Kane, Julien MacDonald, Jeremy Scott, Giles Deacon, Vivienne Westwood, and opened the pre-Fall 2011 Chanel show. In 2012, she walked in the Victoria's Secret Fashion Show. In February 2012, she became an ambassador for L'Oréal Paris. In 2016, Palvin was part of the Sports Illustrated Swimsuit Rookie Class.

Palvin began branching out into acting, after she appeared in the 2014 film Hercules as mythological queen Antimache.

In 2016, she was ranked 4th in Maxim Hot 100. Tumblr's 2017 list of most popular models reported Palvin to be the second most popular model on the social media site.

Palvin returned to the Victoria's Secret Fashion Show in 2018. The next year, she became the first Hungarian Victoria's Secret Angel.

== Public image ==
Palvin is often compared to Russian model Natalia Vodianova; British Vogue editor Miranda Almond said, "We chose Barbara because she is absolutely exquisite-looking, a cross between a young Brooke Shields and Natalia Vodianova". Palvin credits Vodianova and Kate Moss as her favorite models. Palvin's curves and non-standard runway measurements have been considered by the media to be the brand's direction toward "body positivity".

== Personal life ==
In 2018, Palvin began a relationship with American actor Dylan Sprouse. They resided in Brooklyn until 2021, when they moved to Los Angeles. In June 2023, they announced that they were engaged since September 2022. On July 15, 2023, the couple married in the town of Albertirsa, Hungary, in the same church that Palvin's parents married. Palvin took his surname upon marriage. In May 2026, the couple announced that they were expecting their first child, their daughter was born in September 2026.

In August 2025, Palvin revealed that she had endometriosis and underwent surgery to ease its symptoms.

== Filmography ==
Year	Film	Role	Ref.
2014	Hercules	Antimache	
2021	Tyger Tyger	Eggzema	
2022	Serpentine (short film)	Eve	
