= Kerry Mondragon =

Film Director & Screenwriter

- Born: Kerry Mondragon; July 9, 1984 (age 42); Tucson, Arizona, United States
- Occupations: Filmmaker, Screenwriter, Director
- Years active: 2014–present
- Notable work: Tyger Tyger (2021)

Kerry Mondragon is an independent filmmaker, screenwriter and director. His feature films include Tyger Tyger (2021) and Wetiko, which premiered at the New Orleans Film Festival in 2022 and received a US release in 2026.

== Career ==
After high school, Mondragon worked at a San Francisco advertising agency. Mondragon was mentored in film direction by Spike Lee while serving as Lee's assistant and associate producer during the filming of the latter's Da Sweet Blood of Jesus (2014). He cites Jean Vigo and Rainer Werner Fassbinder as influences. Mondragon also credits Allen Ginsberg, with whom he corresponded as a young person, as a mentor and creative influence.

Mondragon's debut feature film, Tyger Tyger (2019) released to mixed reviews. It notably was ranked #16 on Seventeen magazine's 25 Best Movies of 2021.

Mondragon's second feature film, Wetiko, starring Juan Daniel Garcia Trevino, Dalia Xiuhcoatl, Neil Sandilands, Barbara de Reigl, and Jordan Barrett premiered at the Stockholm International Film Festival on November 9, 2022. This film's theme revolves around the odyssey of a young Maya man who is navigating his way through the treacherous undercurrents of a shady New Age ecovillage in the Yucatán. It features dialogue in English, Spanish, Maya, Afrikaans, and one fictional language. Reviewing the film for Film Threat, Michael Talbot-Haynes rated the film with a score of 9.5 out of 10, compared Mondragon's directorial style to that of Roger Corman and praised the film's depiction of spiritual exploitation and cultural appropriation in the Maya selva. Talbot-Haynes faulted one scene in a film he otherwise described as "one of the more visionary works of weird art ever to hit the screen" and an instant cult classic. Writing in Third Coast Review, Lauren Weiner described Wetiko as a "beautiful movie" that addressed "great themes of culture clash and colonization." Weiner praised the film for distinctive and beautiful cinematography, "A-list" acting quality, and its casting of indigenous Maya people. Breaking Convention, a major psychedelic culture gathering and convention held annually in the UK, featured Wetiko in 2025 in a private screening and hosted Mondragon as a speaker, acknowledging the film's significance in psychedelic culture.

Mondragon's latest film as screenwriter-director, Mascotland, is currently in post-production. It tells the story of two young men who escape after being raised in captivity by a disturbed kidnapper and features Billy Zane, Tyrese Gibson, Jake Busey, Armie Hammer, Craig Stark, Felicia Pearson, Oliver Wyman, and Blaine Kerr.

== Filmography ==
Year	Title	Notes
2015	Meet Me at a Funeral	Short
2021	Tyger Tyger	Also editor
2022	Wetiko	
