= A Little Family Drama =

2024 American comedy drama

- Directed by: Nadia Zoe
- Written by: Ramon O. Tores, Nadia Zoe
- Produced by: Michael D. Karp, Ramon O. Torres, Nadia Zoe
- Music by: Steve Berlin
- Distributed by: Emblematic Pictures
- Release date: 11 October 2024 (location)

A Little Family Drama is a 2024 American comedy drama. It was the directorial debut of Nadia Zoe and won awards at seven film festivals prior to its release in theaters.

== Plot ==
The Sepulvedas are a Mexican-American family whose lives revolve around their family-owned restaurant. They gather for an annual family reunion dinner when secrets from the past begin to cause tension in the family. One of the biggest secrets surrounds one of the family members who put the restaurant at stake, causing the rest of the family to reevaluate their family roles.

== Cast ==
- Marissa Reyes, Yaretzi
- Romi Dias, Victoria
- Diana Elizabeth Torres, Cecilia
- Alma Martinez, Anselma
- Jeff Meacham, Jason
- Eric Dean, Loan officer
- Cleo Handler, Marisella
- Kahlo De Jesus Buffington, Marketing executive
- Ramon O. Torres

== Release ==
A Little Family Drama was selected as the opening film at the 24th annual Valley Film Festival in 2024, as well as the closing film for the 45th annual CineFest San Antonio. It had a limited release in theaters on October 11, 2024.

== Reception ==
The film received positive reviews, with Film Threat stating that "the cast, with each actor delivering a heartfelt performance that feels natural to the situation at hand, keeps the audience engaged and invested in the story." New Jersey Stage stated that,"through its harmonious color, the beauty of kinship transcends the brilliant visuals and turns this movie into a lovely family weekend movie night choice."

== Awards and recognition ==
A Little Family Drama has won awards at seven different film festivals.

- Richmond International Film Festival, Latin Heritage Makers Award
- Viva Texas Film Festival, Best Narrative Feature
- Silicon Beach Film Festival, Best Female Actor (Alma Martinez)
- Wyoming International Film Festival
  - Jury Award for Best Narrative Feature
  - Audience Award for Best Feature Film
- Festival de Cine Latino Americano, Spirit Latino Award
- Sedona International Film Festival, Best Indie Spirit Feature Film
- XicanIndie Film Festival, Outstanding Independent Feature Award
