= Tyger Tyger (film) =

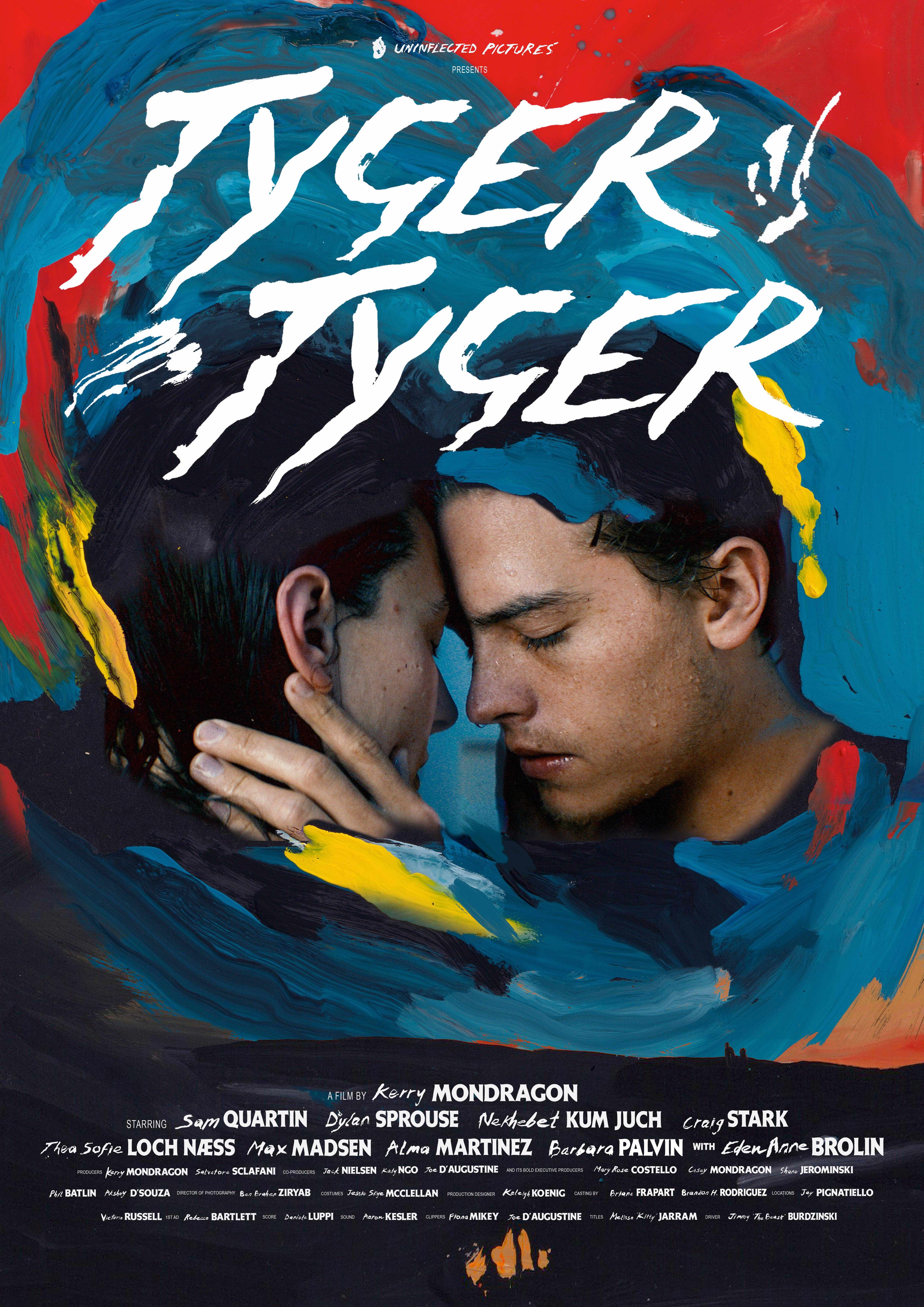
- Directed by: Kerry Mondragon
- Written by: Kerry Mondragon
- Produced by: Kerry Mondragon, Salvatore Sclafani
- Starring: Dylan Sprouse; Sam Quartin; Nekhebet Kum Juch; Thea Sofie Loch Naess; Craig Stark; Eden Anne Brolin; Alma Martinez; Max Madsen
- Cinematography: Ziryab Ben Brahem
- Edited by: Joe D'Augustine; Kerry Mondragon
- Music by: Daniele Luppi
- Release date: 26 February 2021
- Country: United States
- Language: English

Tyger Tyger is a 2021 pandemic thriller written and directed by Kerry Mondragon. It stars Dylan Sprouse, Sam Quartin, Nekhebet Kum Juch, Thea Sofie Loch Naess, Craig Stark, Eden Anne Brolin, Alma Martinez, and Max Madsen. Filmed on location in Southern California’s Slab City and Bombay Beach, the film gathered notoriety because it portrays a mysterious pandemic, yet was filmed just before the COVID-19 pandemic begun.

== Plot ==
An outlaw woman and her gang robs a pharmacy of its pandemic meds in order to distribute the meds in an anarchic Free City in the Southern California Desert. During her escape, she kidnaps a junkie and they fall in love on the lam, finding themselves trapped in the fringe lands of a psychedelic city beyond the law.

== Cast ==
- Dylan Sprouse as Luke Hart
- Sam Quartin as Blake
- Thea Sofie Loch Naess as Emerald
- Craig Stark as Joe
- Eden Brolin as Tammie
- Nekhebet Kum Juch as Bobby
- Max Madsen as Cole
- Alma Martinez as Doctor Rosa
- Barbara Palvin as Eggzema

== Production ==
The film was written by Mondragon based on his own experiences with drugs. He wrote it in two weeks, after having spent some time in the encampments of Slab City, California.

Tyger Tyger was filmed at Slab City, an anarchic off the grid squatter city build on an abandoned military base in the Sonoran Desert and populated by "anarchists, artists, drug addicts, eccentrics, outcasts, retirees, and the impoverished." Filmed on an ultra-low budget, it has been nevertheless been compared to Nomadland since it features performances by non-actors in their natural environments.

== Release ==
On February 26, 2021, the film received a limited theatrical release and as video on demand the same day.

== Reception ==
On Rotten Tomatoes, the film has an approval rating of 10% average rating of 3.9/10 based on reviews from 10 critics.

Hollywood Insider called it "a stunning ode to art". Brazilian Press saw the film as Mondragon's rise as an auteur. Leslie Felperin of The Guardian commented: "(T)he film-makers are lucky poor old William Blake’s work is out of copyright, otherwise his heirs (were any to be found) would have a good reason to sue." Peter Sobczynski of RogerEbert.com called it a "boring, incoherent mess". Alex Saveliev of Film Threat wrote: "If you enjoy being sober around your trippin’ buddies, then Tyger Tyger may be for you, but you’re much more likely to feel left out."

== Sources ==
- "Sam Quartin, Eden Brolin and Kerry Mondragon on the Pandemic Thriller Tyger Tyger [Exclusive Interview]". Lrmonline.com. February 26, 2021.
- Stern, Marlow (February 28, 2021). "Dylan Sprouse Reckons With His Disney Past and Looks Toward the Future". TheDailyBeast.com.
- "Movie Review: 'Tyger Tyger'". Vocal.media.
- Movie Review: 'TYGER TYGER' (2021) A Unique Modern Age Western-Drama
- How Kerry Mondragon Confronted Personal Demons To Make Fantasy Thriller 'Tyger Tyger'
- Dylan Sprouse on 'Tyger Tyger,' Taking Back Agency, Learning Mandarin, & More
