= Thea Sofie Loch Næss =

Norwegian actress (born 1996)

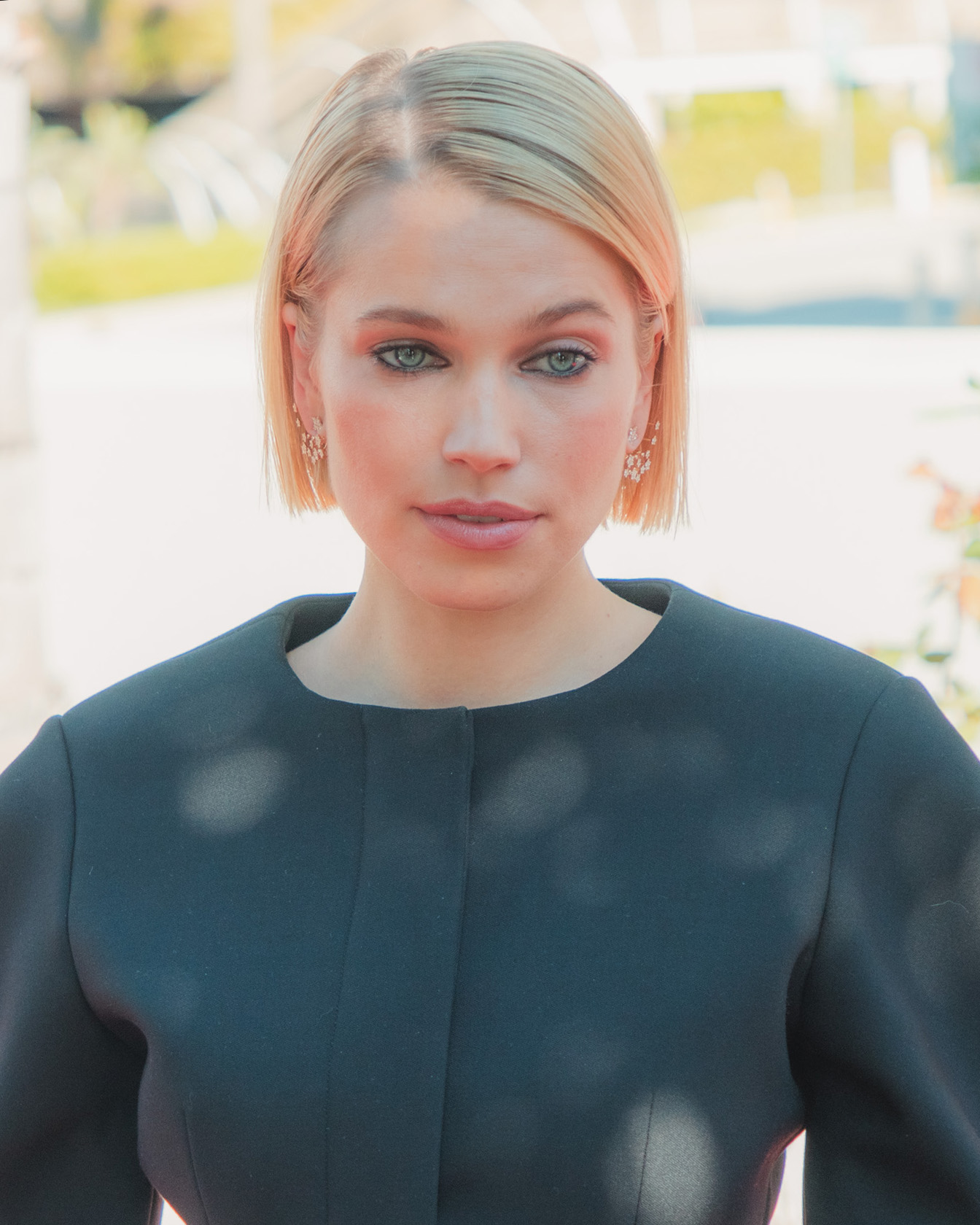
- Næss in 2026
- Born: 26 November 1996 (age 29); Kristiansand, Agder, Norway
- Occupation: Actress
- Years active: 2014–present
- Notable work: The Last Kingdom; The Ugly Stepsister

Thea Sofie Loch Næss (born 26 November 1996, Kristiansand) is a Norwegian actress.

== Career ==
She started acting at the age of 8. She played a leading role in Eirik Svensson’s coming-of-age film 'One Night in Oslo' in 2013, which premiered in April 2014. In 2014 Næss was studying drama at the Hartvig Nissens school in Oslo. She played the role of Thea in Dryads in 2015. She played the role of the king's daughter Christina of Norway in The Last King which premiered in 2016. In 2016 she was cast in a pilot for a new HBO series (Mogadishu, Minnesota) that ultimately wasn't picked up. In 2018 she took the role of villain Skade in the third series of The Last Kingdom on Netflix, and played Bergliot in Episode Six of Saving the Human Race on CW Seed. In 2024 she had the lead role in the eight part biographical mini series So Long, Marianne, portraying the title character Marianne Ihlen, Canadian poet Leonard Cohen's big love through the 1960s.

== Filmography ==
Film
| Year | Title | Role | Notes |
|---|---|---|---|
| 2014 | Natt til 17 | Thea | |
| 2014 | High Point | Benedicte | Short film |
| 2015 | Polaroid | Linda | Short film |
| 2015 | Dryads - Girls Don't Cry | Thea | |
| 2016 | The Last King | Kristina | |
| 2017 | Som om himmelen revna | Thea | Short film |
| 2018 | Jeg kom ikke hit for å danse | Aurora | Short film |
| 2019 | Tyger Tyger | Emerald | |
| 2020 | Da du dro | Sarah | |
| 2020 | Good Luck | Helene | Short film |
| 2021 | Delete Me | Marit | |
| 2022 | Arctic Void | Lucy | |
| 2022 | Gjensyn | Tyra | Short film |
| 2023 | A Happy Day | Ingvild | |
| 2025 | The Ugly Stepsister | Agnes / Cinderella | Premiere at the 2025 Sundance Film Festival on 23 January. |

Television
| Year | Title | Role | Notes |
|---|---|---|---|
| 2016 | Costa del Kongsvik | Alma | |
| 2016 | Mogadishu, Minnesota | Lacy | Television film |
| 2017 | Unge lovende | | Episode: "2.4" |
| 2018 | The Last Kingdom | Skade | 8 episodes |
| 2018 | Wisting | Linnea Kaupang | 4 episodes |
| 2019–2020 | Hjerteslag | Mio | 35 episodes |
| 2022 | A Storm for Christmas | Sara | 6 episodes |
| 2023 | Evil | Marja | 6 episodes |
| 2024 | La Palma | Marie | 4 episodes |
| 2024 | Twilight of the Gods | Thyra | voice role; 6 episodes |
| 2024 | So Long, Marianne | Marianne Ihlen | Main role; 8 episodes |
