= Daniel Valdez =

American actor (born 1949)

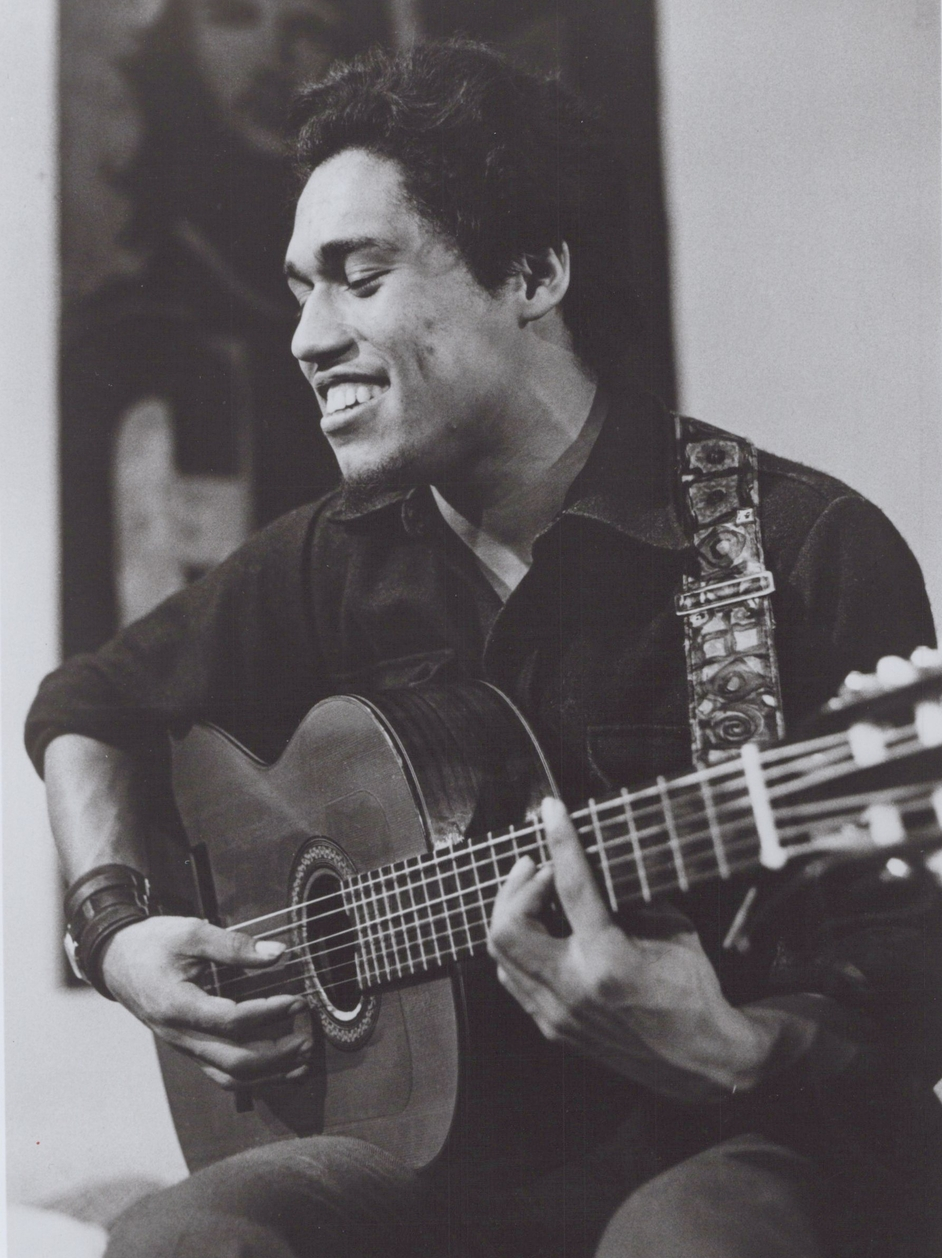
- Valdez in 1970
- Born: April 27, 1949 (age 77); California, U.S.
- Occupations: Actor; musician; composer; activist
- Family: Luis Valdez (brother); Lalo Guerrero (second cousin)

Daniel Valdez (born April 27, 1949) is an American actor, musician, composer, and activist. He is best known for his work as musical director of the films Zoot Suit (1981) and La Bamba (1987).

== Early life ==
Daniel Valdez was born to Francisco and Armida Valdez. His brother is Luis Valdez. In 1966, Valdez joined Cesar Chavez's United Farm Workers union.

== Career ==
Valdez and his brother co-founded the theater group, Teatro Campesino. In 1973, Valdez's first solo album, Mestizo, became the first Chicano album to be produced by a major label, A&M Records.

During the late 1970s, Valdez appeared in such films as Which Way Is Up? (1977), with Richard Pryor, and The China Syndrome (1979), with Jane Fonda, Jack Lemmon and Michael Douglas. He garnered recognition for playing Henry Reyna on Broadway in his brother's 1979 play, Zoot Suit. In 1981, Valdez reprised his role in the film adaptation of the same name, for which he also co-wrote the original music. He also composed music for the play as well.

In 1987, Valdez served as an associate producer of La Bamba, the biopic based on the life of Ritchie Valens. The project, which became a hit, was a "life-long dream" of Valdez's that came true. That same year, he appeared and wrote songs in Born in East L.A. (1987), starring Cheech Marin. He performed some of the featured songs in that film. Daniel Valdez sang and played guitar on Linda Ronstadt's multi-platinum album Canciones de Mi Padre. The album won the Grammy for Best Mexican-American Album in 1988. There was also a live performance made through Elektra which was featured as a PBS Great Performances episode.

In 1996, Valdez composed the original score to the IMAX documentary, Mexico. In 1997, Valdez served as a musical consultant and a historical expert for the San Diego Repertory Theatre and Southwestern College's revival of Zoot Suit. While he was at Southwestern, Valdez wrote his first original musical, Ollin.

In 2000, he appeared in the musical, Selena Forever. That same year, he reprised his role as musical director at the Goodman Theater in Chicago for their production of Zoot Suit. The next year, he participated in another production of the play with his brother, Luis.

In 2010, Valdez acted in the TheatreWorks production of José Cruz González's play, Sunsets and Margaritas at the Lucie Stern Theatre.

== Filmography ==
=== Feature films ===
- Which Way Is Up? (1977)
- The China Syndrome (1979)
- Zoot Suit (1981)
- La Bamba (1987)
- Born in East L.A. (1987)

== Discography ==
=== Studio albums ===
- Mestizo (1973)
