= Zoot Suit (film) =

1981 film by Luis Valdez

- Theatrical release poster
- Directed by: Luis Valdez
- Written by: Luis Valdez
- Based on: Zoot Suit; 1978 play by Luis Valdez
- Produced by: Peter Burrell
- Starring: Daniel Valdez; Edward James Olmos
- Cinematography: David Myers
- Edited by: Jacqueline Cambas
- Music by: Lalo Guerrero; Daniel Valdez
- Production companies: Center Theatre Group; Mark Taper Forum
- Distributed by: Universal Pictures
- Release date: October 2, 1981
- Running time: 103 minutes
- Country: United States
- Language: English
- Budget: $2.7 million
- Box office: $3,256,082

Zoot Suit is a 1981 American independent drama musical film of the Broadway play Zoot Suit. Both the play and film were written and directed by Luis Valdez. The film stars Daniel Valdez, Edward James Olmos—both reprising their roles from the stage production—and Tyne Daly. Many members of the cast of the Broadway production also appeared in the film. Like the play, the film features music from Daniel Valdez and Lalo Guerrero, the "father of Chicano music."

Zoot Suit presents a fictionalized version of the Sleepy Lagoon murder trial, where a group of young Mexican-Americans were charged with murder, resulting in the racially fueled Zoot Suit Riots throughout Los Angeles.

== Plot ==
In the barrios of Los Angeles in the early 1940s against the backdrop of the Zoot Suit Riots and World War II, Henry Reyna (inspired by real-life defendant Hank Leyvas) is a pachuco gangster. El Pachuco, an idealized Zoot Suiter, functions as narrator throughout the story and serves as Henry's conscience.

The film starts out with singing and dancing at the party. Henry Reyna, a young Mexican American, is arrested for murder by the LAPD a day before he leaves for the Navy. Police officers then interrogate and beat him.

In a flashback, El Pachuco stands next to Henry's bedroom dresser and hands him a switchblade to put in his pocket after Henry gets dressed in a zoot suit. Henry's mother Dolores has a bad feeling about him dressing in the zoot suit.

Henry and his friends are jailed after being accused of the murder of Jose Diaz at Sleepy Lagoon. George Shearer tried to help them defend the murder case. El Pachuco and Henry disagree about the lawyer; El Pachuco believes that Henry should not accept help from a white man.

The film flashes back to the night of the dance. Rudy, Henry's brother, is drunk and tries to start a fight with Rafas, but Henry breaks them up and goes back to dancing. Rafas harasses Della, leading to Henry and Rafas fighting with switchblades. Henry tackles Rafas and has him on the floor with a switchblade to his neck, but at El Pachuco's urging chooses not to kill him.

Back in the present, Shearer tells a judge it has been two months since the boys have had a haircut or any clean clothes. The first witness is Sergeant Frank Galindo, who discovered/found Jose Sanchez's dead body at Sleepy Lagoon.

Della then testifies that after the party, she and Henry drove to Sleepy Lagoon. They got out of the car to enjoy the view and heard music at a party going on across the way. A car bearing Rafas and his friends arrives; the men threaten Henry and Della before smashing the car and fighting Henry.

After waking, Harry goes into town and gets his friends. By the time they return to Sleepy Lagoon, Rafas and his friends were gone. They head across the lagoon to the party at the ranch heard earlier, and are attacked upon being mistaken for Rafas's group. Della sees El Pachuco beating someone on the ground. At the end of Della's testimony, she is remanded to the custody of the Ventura School for Girls.

The boys are found guilty of the first- and second-degree murder. Alice Bloomfield, a newspaper writer trying to help clear their names, visits them in jail. Henry tells her he wants to drop out of the case. She argues with him, and Henry decides to get back in the case. Henry flirts with Bloomfield and she asked him to write an article and he says only if they write privately. Bloomfield revisits Henry and tells him how Della is doing at Ventura School for Girls, but Henry is mad at Bloomfield because she didn't reply to his love letters. She admits she doesn't want to lose her job after the case is over. Henry then kisses her and walks out.

Henry is confined to solitary for 90 days for bad behavior. During this period, Henry battles his inner thoughts with El Pachuco, leading to a deteriorating mental state. Della visits to see how Henry is doing, and lets him know that she is out of the Ventura School for Girls thanks to four months off for good behavior.

On November 8, 1944, Henry and the boys were released from jail for being wrongfully convicted.

However, it is then revealed Henry would be sent back to prison only a few years later for armed robbery, dying behind bars. But El Pachuco snaps them back to the dance hall, where two alternate endings of Henry's story are offered by the different characters: perhaps Henry died in jail; or maybe he died in the Korean war; or maybe he and Della lived happily ever after in LA.

== Cast ==
- Daniel Valdez as Henry Reyna
- Edward James Olmos as "El Pachuco", portrayed as a true zoot suiter with a long black coat and red undershirt.
- Rose Portillo as Della
- Charles Aidman as George Shearer
- Tyne Daly as Alice Bloomfield
- John Anderson as Judge F.W. Charles
- Abel Franco as Enrique
- Bernadette Colognne as "Legs"
- Mike Gomez as Jose "Joey" Castro, a member of the 38th Street gang
- Alma Martínez as Lupe, Henry's younger sister
- Francis X. McCarthy as Press
- Lupe Ontiveros as Dolores Reyna
- Marco Rodríguez as Ismael "Smiley" Torres, co-founder of the 38th Street gang
- Kelly Ward as Tommy Roberts, a member of the 38th Street gang
- Kurtwood Smith as Sergeant Smith
- Dennis Stewart as Swabbie
- Robert Beltran as Lowrider
- Tony Plana as Rudy Reyna, Henry's brother and a troublemaker who is also in the 38th Street gang

== Reception and legacy ==
Vincent Canby of the New York Times called it "a holy mess of a movie, full of earnest, serious intentions and virtually no achievements".

The film earned some controversy for being staged as a combination of play and movie; most of it was shot in normal cinematic fashion, but some scenes featured audience members watching the show, with the actors occasionally performing among them—a decision that Leonard Maltin in his Movie Guide called "a major distraction".

On Rotten Tomatoes Zoot Suit has an approval rating of 55% based on reviews from 11 critics.

In 2019, the film was selected for preservation in the United States National Film Registry by the Library of Congress as being "culturally, historically, or aesthetically significant".

=== Awards ===
The film was nominated for the 1982 Golden Globe Award for Best Motion Picture - Musical or Comedy (won by Arthur). Luis Valdez won the 1983 Critics Award at the Festival du Film Policier de Cognac for Zoot Suit in Cognac, France.

== Home media ==
The film was released on Blu-ray by Kino Lorber March 15, 2022.

== See also ==
- Zoot Suit, the play
- Zoot suit
- Zoot Suit Riots
- List of hood films
