= La Palma (miniseries) =

2024 Norwegian miniseries

- Genre: Drama
- Created by: Martin Sundland; Lars Gudmestad; Harald Rosenløw Eeg
- Starring: Anders Baasmo Christiansen; Ingrid Bolsø Berdal; Alma Günther; Thea Sofie Loch Næss; Bernard Storm Lager; Ólafur Darri Ólafsson; Jorge de Juan; Ruth Lecuona; Armund Harboe; Jenny Evensen; Iselin Shumba Skjæveslandn; Thorbjørn Harr
- Country of origin: Norway
- Original language: Norwegian (Note: with some dialogue in English and Spanish)
- No. of episodes: 4

Production
- Running time: 39–50 minutes

Original release
- Network: Netflix
- Release: 12 December 2024

La Palma is a Norwegian disaster drama miniseries inspired by the Cumbre Vieja tsunami hazard hypothesis and partially based on the 2021 Cumbre Vieja volcanic eruption. The series, primarily filmed on the island of La Palma in the Canary Islands, also includes scenes shot in Tenerife. The plot follows a Norwegian family on holidays in La Palma as they confront chaos when researchers uncover signs of an imminent volcanic eruption that could trigger a catastrophic tsunami.

Though the series' portrayals are fictional, Cumbre Vieja is real, being the most active volcano on the island of La Palma, with eruptions recorded as far back as 125,000 years ago. It erupted in 2021, following previous blowups in 1971 and 1949.

== Cast and characters ==
Actor	Character
Anders Baasmo Christiansen	Fredrik
Ingrid Bolsø Berdal	Jennifer
Alma Günther	Sara
Thea Sofie Loch Næss	Marie
Bernard Storm Lager	Tobias
Ólafur Darri Ólafsson	Haukur
Jorge de Juan	Álvaro
Ruth Lecuona	Anna
Armund Harboe	Erik
Jenny Evensen	Charlie
Iselin Shumba Skjæveslandn	Karin
Thorbjørn Harr	Jens

Source: Screen Rant

== Episodes ==
1. "Cry Wolf"
2. "Take-off"
3. "Exit Tenerife"
4. "Safe Spot"

== Reception ==
The series has garnered mixed reviews. It has generated criticism, especially in Spain, and more specifically in the Canary Islands. A lack of accuracy in the representation of facts has been pointed out, especially with regard to the scientific argumentation, the eruption, and the megatsunami, which have been the subject of debate.

Viewers criticised the perspective of the story, which narrated the events from the point of view of Norwegian tourists, relegating the local perspective to secondary or supporting roles.

The story of the family's teenage daughter, whose plot twists have been described by some as absurd, has also been criticised.
