= Bruce Tegner =

American judoka

- Born: October 28, 1929
- Died: August 28, 1985 (aged 55)

Bruce Tegner (1929-1985) was a martial artist, author, and actor. Bruce practiced a number of martial arts including Savate, Judo, Karate, Jujutsu, and Jukado. His books were key to introducing others to martial arts, including Paul Weitz and Chris Weitz. He additionally choreographed a fight scene in the 1962 movie Manchurian Candidate. In addition, he appeared in a number of TV shows, including The Adventures of Ozzie and Harriet. In 1963, Tegner founded the self-defense-oriented martial art of Jukado based on Japanese Judo and Jujutsu, Karate, Aikido, and stick fighting (escrima).

== Personal life ==
Tegner died of a heart attack at the age of 55 in Ventura, California on August 28, 1985. He was cremated and his ashes were buried at sea in Ventura Harbor.

Bruce was married to Canadian activist Alice McGrath from 1977 until his death.

== Books ==
- Karate: The Open Hand & Foot Fighting Volume 1 Self-Defense (1959)
- Savate: French Foot Fighting (1960)
- Bruce Tegner Method of Self-Defense: The Best of Judo, Jujutsu, Karate, Savate, Yawara, Aikido, Ate-Waze (1960)
- Self-Defense for Women: A Simple Method (1961)
- Judo|Karate For Law Officers: Defense and Control: A Simple Method (1962)
- Bruce Tegner's Complete Book of Self-Defense (1963)
- Karate (1963)
- Isometric Power Exercises (1964)
- Bruce Tegner's Complete Book of Judo (1967)
- Self-Defense for Girls: A Secondary School and College Manual (1967)
- Kung Fu & Tai Chi: Chinese Karate & Classical Exercises (1968)
- Bruce Tegner's Compete Book of Jukado Self Defense (1968)
- Self-Defense for Boys and Men: A Physical Education Course (1968)
- Self-Defense Nerve Centers and Pressure Points for Karate, Jujutsu, and Atemi-Waza (1968)
- Bruce Tegner's Complete Book of Karate (1970)
- Bruce Tegner's Complete Book of Aikido and Holds & Locks (1970)
- Self-Defense You Can Teach Your Boy: A Confidence-Building Course (1970)
- Judo for Fun: Sport Techniques (1970)
- Karate & Judo Exercises (1972)
- Defense Tactics for Law Enforcement Volume 1: Weaponless Defense & Control (1972)
- Stick Fighting: Sport Forms (1973)
- Black Belt Judo, Karate, & Jukado (1973)
- Judo: Sport Techniques for Physical Fitness & Tournament (1976)
- Self-Defense for Your Child (1976)
- Self-Defense & Assault Prevention for Girls & Women (1977)
- Bruce Tegner's Complete Book of Jujutsu (1978)
- Self-Defense: A Basic Course (1979)
- Judo: Beginner to Black Belt (1982)
- Stick Fighting: Self-Defense (1982)
- Karate: Beginner to Black Belt (1982)
- Aikido & Bokata (1983)
