= Marissa Reyes =

American actress

- Born: November 10, 2003 (age 22); Austin, Texas, U.S.
- Occupation: Actress
- Years active: 2022–present

Marissa Reyes (born November 10, 2003) is an American actress. She is known for portraying Arianna Horton on the soap opera Days of Our Lives and Cami on Raven's Home.

== Early life ==
Reyes was born in Austin, Texas. She attended the Adderley School for Performing Arts and studied at UCLA's TV/Film Summer Institute. She additionally participated in the Complete Singer/Actor Program at the Juilliard School.

== Career ==
At the start of her career, she appeared in the 2022 horror film Spirit Halloween: The Movie and the comedy series That Girl Lay Lay. Her first big role came playing Cami in the Disney Channel sitcom Raven's Home. She appeared in the films Ganymede and A Little Family Drama where she played the lead role of Yaretzi. Her biggest role so far has been playing Arianna Horton in the soap opera Days of Our Lives. More recently, she has appeared in the drama series Bosch: Legacy and the Netflix sports comedy series Running Point.

== Filmography ==
Film performances
Year	Title	Role	Notes
2022	Spirit Halloween: The Movie	Kate	
2023	Ganymede	Bree	
2024	A Little Family Drama	Yaretzi	

Television performances
Year	Title	Role	Notes
2023	That Girl Lay Lay	Felicia	2 episodes
2022–2023	Raven's Home	Cami	8 episodes
2023	Table Read Podcast	Sophia	Episode: "12 Steps of Christmas"
2025	Running Point	Sofia	4 episodes
2025	Bosch: Legacy	Sofia Velasco	Episode: "Welcome to the Other Side"
2025	Days of Our Lives	Arianna Horton	Series regular
