= Pancho López (performance artist) =

Pancho López (born June 3, 1972) is a performance artist interested in the everyday life and feelings of the human nature, and how it connects with artistic expressions. He is the founder and current director of the Extra! International Performance Art Festival. His work has been presented in China, Uruguay, Chile, Venezuela, Dominican Republic, Colombia, Spain, Poland, Germany, Cuba, Brazil, Canada, the United States and Portugal.

== Academics ==
López was born on June 3, 1972 in Mexico City. He studied Communication Sciences at the Faculty of Political and Social Sciences of UNAM. He attended performance and installation workshops with teachers such as Lorena Wolffer, Monica Mayer, Bartolomé Ferrando, Ron Athey, Abraham Cruzvillegas, Pilar Villela, Andrea Ferreyra and Susan Lewis in places like The Museo Universitario del Chopo, the Tamayo Museum, the National Center of The Arts and Ex Teresa Arte Actual.

== Festivals and cultural events organization ==
For 11 years he was head of the Department of Performance and Contemporary Art of the Museo Universitario del Chopo. Coordinated the International Meeting of Performagia Performance from 2003 to 2009 and published in coordination with UNAM 7 catalogs of the meeting in 2011.

López has coordinated other encounters, contests and festivals such as Subcutaneous: actions under the skin of the city, cultural showcases in the subway system of Mexico City, an alternative fashion contest and the Transmuted Performance Festival. Since 2000 he teaches workshops on performance in areas such as the Museo Universitario del Chopo (2000-2011), the Museo de Arte Carrillo Gil (2001-2004), Ex Teresa Arte Actual and the Museo de la Ciudad de México, as well as in some states of Mexico (San Luis Potosí, Campeche, Tlaxcala, Puebla, amongst others). He has participated in several International exhibitions and festivals of performance art.

== Performance work ==
Pancho Lopez's most important series of performance are "Picnic Formal", presented since 1997 until 2007 in Mexico, USA and Canada; "Sal de Mesa", presented in Mexico, Venezuela, Uruguay and the Dominican Republic; and "Ira (Rabia Contenida), made in Mexico, China, Canada and Poland.

== Work in his hometown ==
He has been a fellow of the Ministry of Culture of the Federal District (Arts Promotion Fellowship in 2000, 2001 and 2002) and FONCA (Cultural Projects Promotion and Coinvestment Ventures in 2003, 19th edition ).

== Cultural promotion ==
He was a journalist for 5 years in the Crónica de Hoy newspaper (Culture section). He worked as coordinator of cultural projects in 2012-2013 for the UNAM Foundation. López also hosts cultural radio shows like De La A a La Jota on UC Radio, and Perforadio.

He is the director of the Cultural Management Career at the Universidad de la Comunicación (México).
