= Pancho López (song) =

Song by Lalo Guerrero
- Released: 1955
- Studio: Real Records

Pancho López is a hit 1955 song by Lalo Guerrero based on the 1954 TV theme The Ballad of Davy Crockett. The song sold more than 500,000 copies in the US. Guerrero performed the song on the Tonight Show and Art Linkletter's show. The record was distributed by Real Records (1955–56) a company that was started and owned by Guerrero, businessman Paul Landwehr, and recording engineer Jimmy Jones. In 1966, Trini Lopez recorded this same song for his second Latin album simply entitled The Second Latin Album for Reprise Records (R/RS 6215).
