= Lalo Guerrero =

American musician, composer and labor activist (1916–2005)

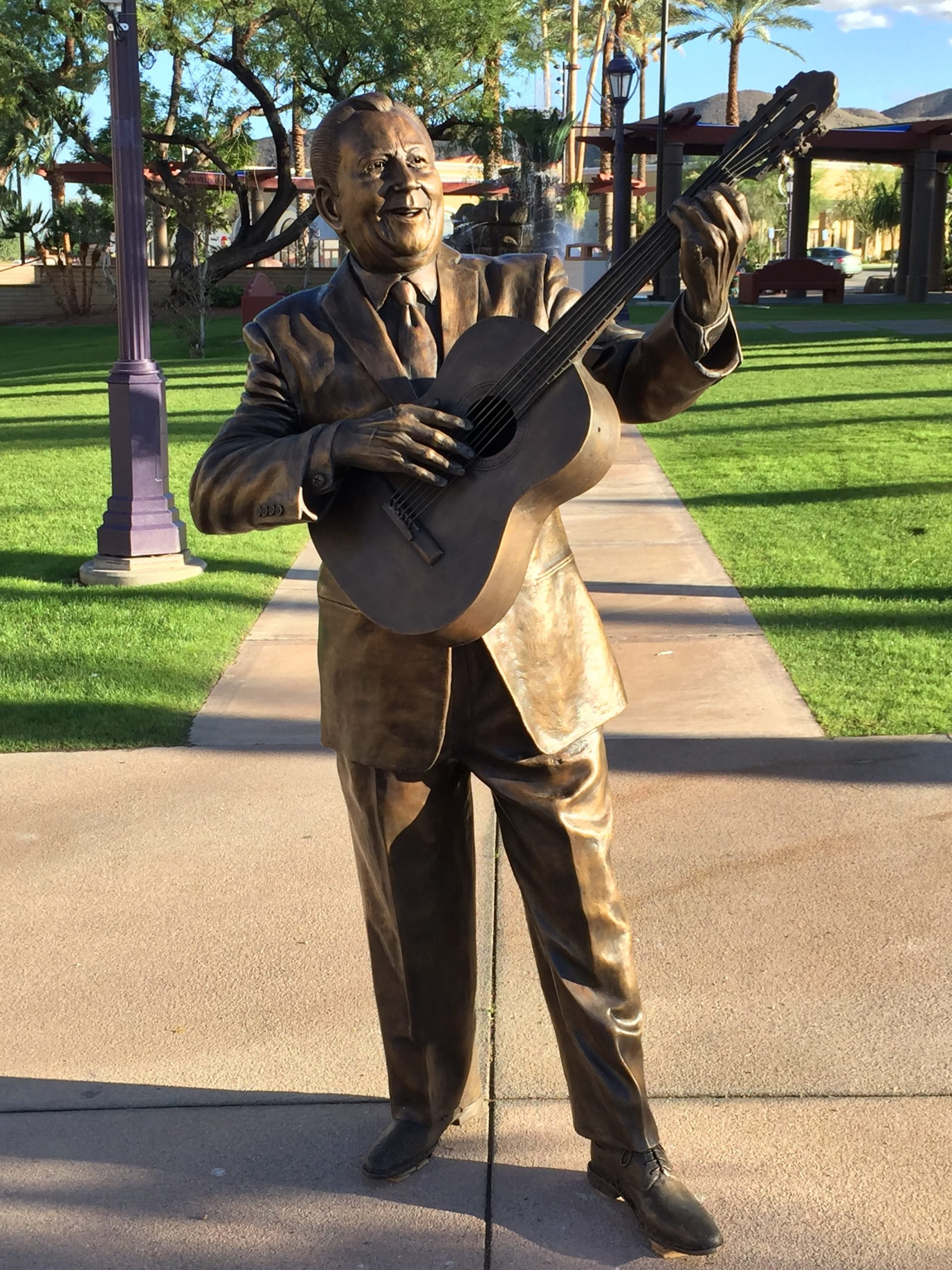
- Statue of Guerrero in Cathedral City, California

Background information
- Born: Eduardo Guerrero Jr. December 24, 1916; Tucson, Arizona, U.S.
- Died: March 17, 2005 (aged 88) Rancho Mirage, California, U.S.
- Genres: Swing; rhythm and blues; salsa; norteño; mambo; rock and roll; jazz; blues
- Occupations: Singer; musician; composer
- Instrument: Guitar
- Years active: 1939–2005

Eduardo "Lalo" Guerrero Jr. (December 24, 1916 – March 17, 2005) was an American guitarist, singer and farm labor activist best known for his strong influence on later Latin musical artists.

== Early life ==
Eduardo Guerrero Jr., nicknamed "Lalo," was born in Tucson, Arizona, one of 21 siblings (although only nine survived). His father worked for the Southern Pacific Railroad. Guerrero left his hometown to pursue his dream in music. He says that he gives his mother all the credit for his musical talent, and Guerrero said she taught him to "embrace the spirit of being Chicano."

Lalo's mother, Concepción, taught him some basic musical skills and encouraged him to hone them during adolescence. She was no professional musician but had taught herself to play guitar. His relationship with his mother greatly influenced his music; one of the major themes of his work was the visibility of the Chicana struggle for dignity. His first group, Los Carlistas (the quartet included Greg "Goyo" Escalante, Chole Salaz and Joe Salaz), represented Arizona at the 1939 New York World's Fair, and performed on the Major Bowes Amateur Hour on radio.

He moved to Los Angeles in the 1940s, and had a few uncredited roles in movies, including Boots and Saddles and His Kind of Woman. He recorded for Imperial Records and fronted the Trio Imperial. He also formed his own orchestra and toured throughout the Southwest. He performed at the La Bamba club in Hollywood, a place frequented by the biggest stars in the movie business. During the 1960s, he bought a night club in Los Angeles and renamed it "Lalo's".

During the 1940s, he became a friend of the Ronstadt family of Arizona, in particular Gilbert Ronstadt, father of popular vocalist Linda Ronstadt, who recalled childhood memories of Guerrero serenading her. At his funeral, she sang a traditional Mexican song in tribute.

== Music ==
Guerrero is known as the father of Chicano music. He recorded and wrote many songs in all sorts of genres. He recorded over 700 songs since his first record in 1939 with Los Carlistas on Vocalion Records. As a songwriter Guerrero wrote songs for El Trio los Panchos, Lola Beltrán, and many other famous artists.

His first American hit was "Pancho López", a parody of the popular 1950s hit "The Ballad of Davy Crockett". Guerrero used the Davy Crockett melody and wrote his own lyrics, telling the story of a legendary Mexican character. Due to criticism he received over this song, he never performed it publicly, not wanting to contribute to an inappropriate stereotype. He went on to record several more parody songs, including "Pancho Claus," "Elvis Perez", "Tacos For Two" (to the tune of "Cocktails For Two"), and "There's No Tortillas" (to the tune of "O Sole Mio"). His earliest Pachuco compositions of the 1940s and 1950s were the basis of the Luis Valdez stage musical, Zoot Suit.

=== Labor songs ===
He also wrote songs about Cesar Chavez, other farm workers and braceros. Chavez said at tribute to Guerrero in 1992 in Palm Desert, California: "Lalo has chronicled the events of the Hispanic in this country a lot better than anyone."

=== WWII: Zoot Suit and Pachuca/o Subculture ===
During WWII, Mexican-American women known as Pachucas began to challenge societal norms in relation to gender, labor, communication and representation. Guerrero's music simultaneously evolved into the Zoot Suit (Pachuca/o) music of the 1940s and 1950s. His songs infused with Pachuco slang, a combination of informal Spanish and English, acted as a megaphone.

=== Children's music ===
He also wrote children's songs presented via his "Las Ardillitas," or "Three Little Squirrels", with his voice sped up. Ross Bagdasarian, Sr., creator of Alvin and the Chipmunks, threatened lawsuit over alleged similarities between the Chipmunks and Las Ardillitas, until Guerrero provided evidence that he had conceived Las Ardillitas first.

In 1995 he recorded a children's album Papa's Dream with Los Lobos.

=== Collaborations ===
In 2005, Guerrero was one of several Chicano musicians who collaborated with Ry Cooder on Cooder's Chávez Ravine album, for which he provided vocals on three songs ("Corrido de Boxeo", "Los Chucos Suaves", and "Barrio Viejo") which helped bring him, at the twilight of his life, to the attention of a wider Anglo audience. Guerrero recorded his last full CD on Break Records, a Los Angeles-based record label, this at age 83. This would become his last music CD. The recording is a collection of Guerrero's best "Zoot Suit" compositions of Latin swing "Pachuco" music.

=== Tributes ===
Guerrero was officially declared a national folk treasure by the Smithsonian Institution in 1980, and was presented with the National Medal of Arts in 1996 by then-United States President Bill Clinton. In 1991, Guerrero received a National Heritage Fellowship from the National Endowment for the Arts, which is the United States government's highest honor in the folk and traditional arts. In late 2005, Guerrero was posthumously inducted into the Arizona Music and Entertainment Hall of Fame. Along with that he was also inducted into the Tejano Hall of Fame and the Mariachi Hall of Fame.

Guerrero's contributions have resulted in Las Glorias, a restaurant in central Phoenix, Arizona displaying a poster of him with his signature on it on the wall for everyone to see in loving memory of him. He also has a blown-up, candid photograph of him as a young man on the wall of a major underpass in Tucson. In Cathedral City, California, the main street in front of the Civic Center is named for him: Avenida Lalo Guerrero.

In 1994, a Golden Palm Star on the Palm Springs Walk of Stars dedicated to him.

== Personal life and death ==
Guerrero was married for over 34 years to his wife Lidia Guerrero. They lived in Cathedral City, California for over 28 years. He died on March 17, 2005, in Rancho Mirage, California, at age 88.
