= Midsummer Scream =

Annual horror convention in Long Beach, California

Midsummer Scream is a Halloween and horror film fan convention held annually in Long Beach, California at the Long Beach Convention and Entertainment Center. Widely considered to be the world's largest convention dedicated to the holiday and the horror genre, it is associated with the haunted attractions of Southern California. It is also linked to the trend of "Summerween" (Halloween celebrations in summer).

In addition to panels featuring notable speakers like John Carpenter, as well as film screenings of classic horror features and new short films, the convention has a large show floor that is divided between a retail space and the Hall of Shadows. The Hall of Shadows is an immersive dark space, which has featured haunt mazes by film studios including Lionsgate Films and New Line Cinema.
