= List of subcultures =

This is a list of subcultures.

== A ==
- Anarcho-punk – Subgenre of punk rock

== B ==
- Ball culture – Black and Latino LGBT subculture in the United States
- B-boys and b-girls – Style of street dance
- BDSM – Erotic practices involving domination and sadomasochism
- Beat Generation – Literary movement and beatniks
- Bikers, see motorcycle clubs and outlaw motorcycle clubs
  - Bōsōzoku – Japanese youth subculture
- Bikini boys – Polish youth sub-culture
- Bills
- Birdwatching – Amateur observation of birds
- Bobby soxer – 1940s American female youth subcultures
- Bodybuilding – Control and development of musculature
- Bro – Subculture of young men
- Brony fandom – Fans of My Little Pony
- Bodgies & Widgies – Youth sub culture Australia and NZ
- Bogan – Unrefined or unsophisticated person

== C ==
- Casuals – Subsection of association football culture
- Chonga – Term for an expressive and sexually liberated woman
- Cosplay – Type of performance arters
- Crust punk – Music genres
- Cryptozoology – Pseudoscience and subculture that studies creatures
- Cyberpunk – Science fiction subgenre in a futuristic dystopian setting
- Cybergoth – Fashion subculture of goth and cyberpunk
- Cholos & Cholas – Mexican-American subculture
- Chav – Stereotype of anti-social youth dressed in sportswears

== D ==
- Dark culture – Umbrella term for dark subcultures
- Dark academia – Subculture centered on Gothic and classic education
- Deadhead – Dedicated fan of the Grateful Dead or spinoff bands from the Grateful Dead
- Deaf culture
- Decora – Contemporary Japanese fashion trends
- Demoscene – Computer art subculture
- DiY – Building, modifying, or repairing, without the aid of experts or professionals
- Dizelaši – 1990s Serbian subculture
- Drag – Gender-defying art
- Dresiarz – Polish term for a specific subculture of young males

== E ==
- E-girls and e-boys – Youth subculture
- Emo – Youth subculture
- Eshay – Slang expression associated with an Australian urban youth subculture

== F ==
- Fandom – Subculture composed of fans sharing a common interest
- Flapper – 1920s women's subcultures
- Flat Earth Society – Anti-scientific belief
- Freak scene – 1960s scene centered in Southern California
- Furry fandom – Subculture interested in anthropomorphic animals
- Frikis – Cuban punk subculture

== G ==
- Gabber – Subgenre of hardcore music
- Glam rock – Genre of rock music
- Glam metal – Genre of heavy metal music
- Gopnik – Russian term for a juvenile delinquent
- Goth subculture – Contemporary musical subculture
- Graffiti writers – Drawings and paintings on surfaces
- Greaser – 1950s and 60s youth subculture in the United States
- Grebo – Subgenre of alternative rock
- Grunge – Genre of rock music
- Guido – Derogatory term for working-class Italian Americans
- Gutter punk – Punk subculture
- Gyaru – Japanese fashion subculture

== H ==
- Hacker – Subculture of individuals
- Halbstarke – Term describing a 1950s German youth subculture
- Hardcore punk – Aggressive and fast subgenre of punk rock
- Hardline – Subculture that advocates a biocentric worldview
- Heavy metal subculture – Culture of heavy metal fans
- Hip hop (culture) – Subculture including music, dance and graffiti,
- Hippie – 1960s subculture
- Hipster – American jazz subculture – 1940s subculture
- Hipster – Subculture defined by claims to authenticity and uniqueness – contemporary subculture
- Hobo – Migratory worker or homeless vagabond

== I ==
- Incelcore – Internet music microgenre
- Incroyables and merveilleuses – Fashionable aristocratic subculture in Paris during the French Directory (1795–1799)
- Indie – Late 2000s-early 2010s aesthetic trend
- Industrial – Music genre

== J ==
- Jampec – Hungarian subculture
- Janeite – Culture of adoring Jane Austens
- Juggalo – Fan of hip hop group Insane Clown Posse
- Juggling
- Jirai-kei and Ryōsangata fashion – Japanese subculture and aesthetic

== L ==
- Lad culture – British and Irish subculture
- La Sape – Sartorial subculture centered on the Congolese cities of Kinshasa and Brazzaville
- Leather subculture – Subculture involving leather garments
- Live Action Role-Players (LARPers) – Game with physically enacted role-play
- Losties – American television series (2004–2010)
- Lolita – Japanese fashion style

== M ==
- Mall goth – Goth subculture
- Mangas – Late 19th, early 20th century Greek social group
- Manguebeat – Brazilian cultural movement
- Metalcore – Genre of music
- Military brat – Child of a member of the U.S. armed forces
- Mod – Subculture in England

== N ==
- Ned Culture – Delinquent subculture prevalent in Scotland, comparable to chav
- New Romantic – 1970s popular culture movement originating in the UK
- New Age travellers – Category of people in the UK living alternative lifestyles
- Nudism/Naturism – Practice and advocacy of social nudity

== O ==
- Otaku – Someone highly interested in anime and manga
- Otherkin – Individuals who identify as not entirely human

== P ==
- Pachuco – Anti-assimilationist Chicano counterculture
- Paninaro – Italian subculture of designer clothing
- Pintos and pintas – Member of a Chicano subculture
- Pokemón – Mid-2000s Chilean youth subculture
- Plural identity – Individuals with multiple personalities
- Preppy – Modern, widespread subculture in the United States
- Psychedelia – 1960s subculture related to the use of psychedelics and psychonauts
- Punk subculture – Anti-establishment subculture

== R ==
- Raggare – Car-centered subculture beginning in the 1950s in Sweden and Northern Europe
- Railfan – Rail transport enthusiast
  - Densha Otaku – Railfans in Japan
  - Trainspotters – Trainspotter subculture
- Rave – Dance party
- Riot grrrl – Underground feminist punk movement
- Rivethead – Subculture of industrial dance music
- Rockabilly – Early style of rock and roll music
- Rocker – Biker subculture members in the United Kingdom
- Role-playing game – Game in which players assume the roles of characters in a fictional settingrs
- Rude boy – Jamaican street subculture since 1960s

== S ==
- Scene – Youth subculture
- Scooterboy – Member of one of several scooter-related subcultures of the 1960s
- Scouting – Youth movement
- Seapunk – Internet subculture
- Sharpies – Members of Australian youth gangs (1960s–1970s)
- Skater – Subgenre of punk rock
- Skinhead – Working-class youth subculture
  - Gay skinhead – Gay subculture,
  - Skinheads Against Racial Prejudice – Group of skinheads opposing racism
    - Redskin – Communist or anarchist skinhead subculture
  - Suedehead – Early-1970s offshoot of skinhead subculture in the United Kingdom and Ireland
  - Trojan skinhead – Cultural identity in the UK
  - White power skinhead – White supremacist skinhead subculture
- Soulboy – Music youth subculture
- Steampunk – Subgenre of science fiction
- Stilyaga – 1940s-1960s Soviet youth counterculture movement
- Straight edge – Subculture of hardcore punk
- Surf – Culture associated with the sport of surfing
- Swingjugend – Counterculture in Nazi Germany

== T ==
- Teenybopper – Young teenager who follows adolescent trends in music, fashion, and culture
- Teddy Boy – Members of a British youth subculture
- Tombakowa młodzież – Polish youth sub-culture
- Trekkie – Fan of the Star Trek franchise

== V ==
- Visual kei – Category of Japanese musicians

== W ==
- Warez scene – Organized network of pirate groups

== Z ==
- Zazou – Subculture in France during World War II

== See also ==
- History of modern Western subcultures
- Outline of culture – Social behavior and norms of a society
- List of fandom names
- Youth subculture – Subcultures associated with young people
