= Alternative culture =

Type of culture that exists outside or on the fringes of mainstream/popular culture

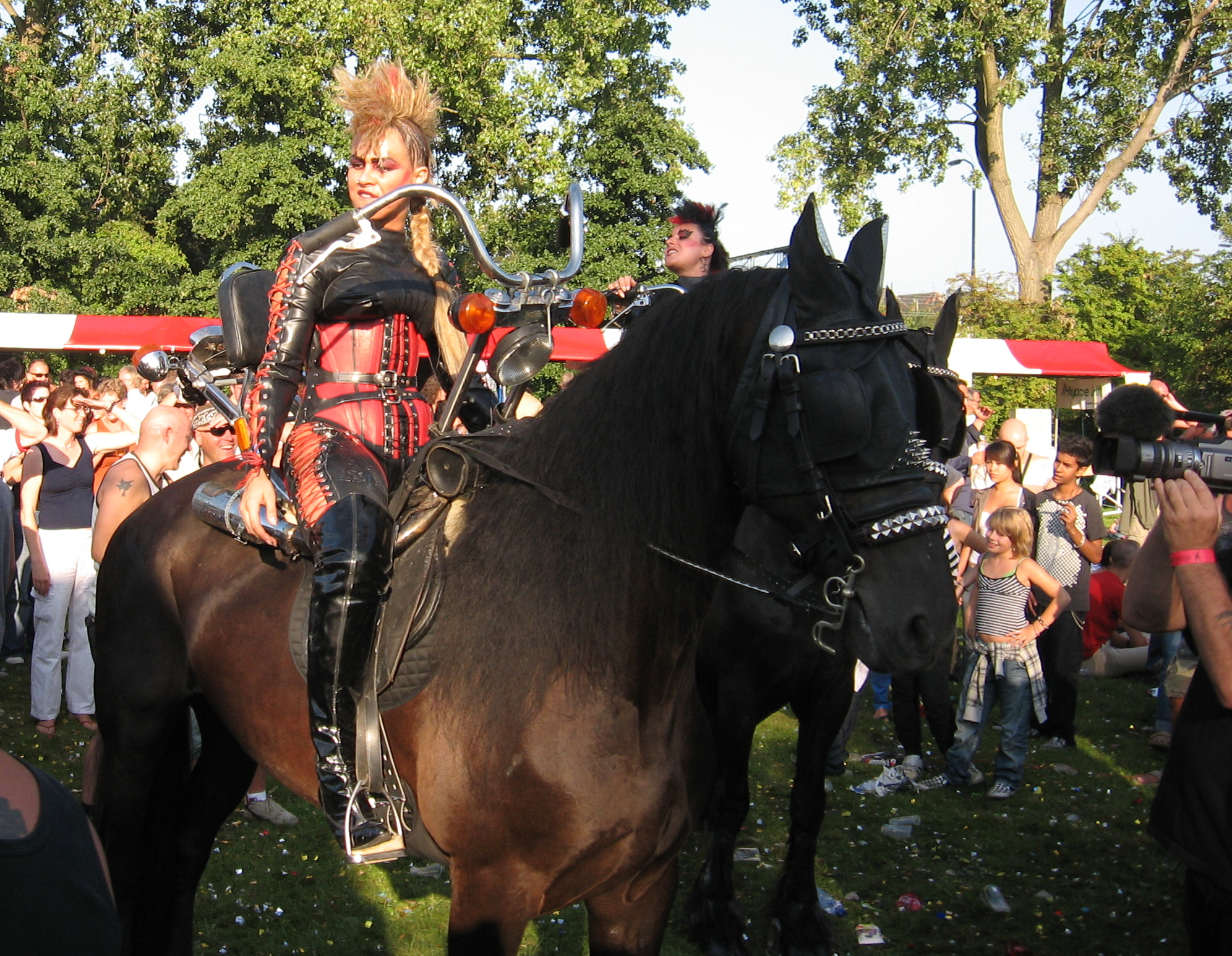
Visiting a pop concert in leather and Mohawk hairstyle on a horse with motor steering stem

Alternative culture is a type of culture that exists outside or on the fringes of mainstream or popular culture, usually under the domain of one or more subcultures. These subcultures may have little or nothing in common besides their relative obscurity, but cultural studies uses this common basis of obscurity to classify them as alternative cultures, or, taken as a whole, the alternative culture. Compare with the more politically charged term, counterculture.

== History ==
Alternative societies have probably always existed, but their peak was during World War II. In 1960 they experienced a boom, some of which have survived as of 2024. Alternative societies arrise for various reasons, for example being part of a minority group which makes large part of alternative culture an LGBTQIA+ individual or aligning with leftist anticapitalist values.

== See also ==
- Alternative fashion – Fashion that does not conform to mainstream styles
- Alternative housing – Category of domicile structures
- Alternative lifestyle – Lifestyles perceived to be outside the cultural norm
- Alternative media – Media sources that differ from established or dominant types of media
- Bohemianism – Practice of an unconventional lifestyle
- Counterculture – Subculture whose values and norms of behavior deviate from those of mainstream society
- List of subcultures
- History of subcultures in the 20th century
- Underground culture – Alternative cultures that differ from the mainstream
