= Bikini boys =

Polish youth sub-culture

Bikini boys Bikiniarze
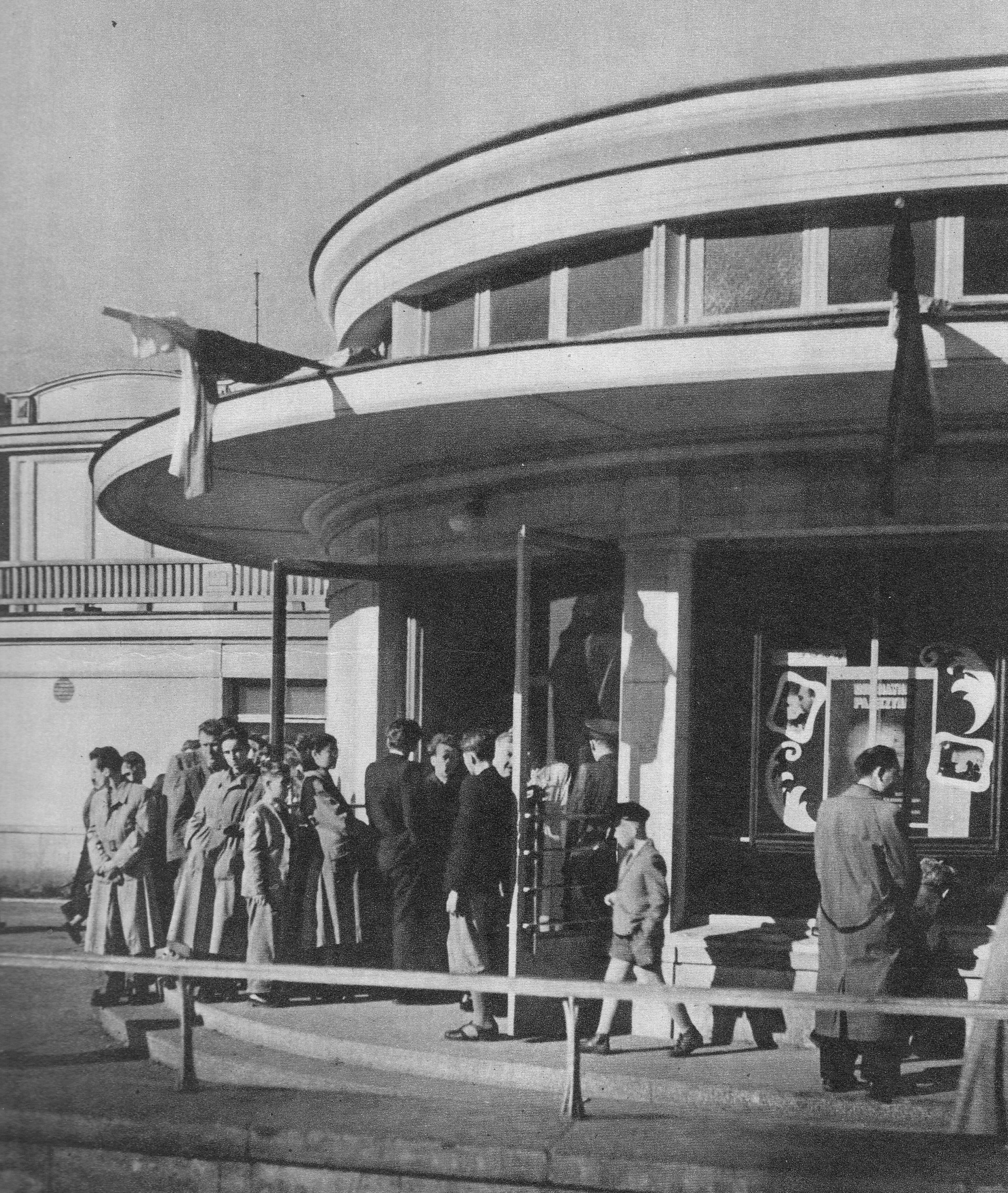
- Bikini boys queue outside the Iluzjon Cinema in Old Mokotów, 1955.
- Years active: 1940s-1950s
- Country: Polish People's Republic
- Major figures: Leopold Tyrmand
- Influences: Tombakowa młodzież
- Influenced: Gitowcy

Bikini boys, known as bikiniarze in Polish, were members of a subculture that originated among youths in Warsaw, Poland, in the 1940s and 1950s. From the capital the movement spread to other parts of the country and provoked a moral panic from the communist authorities. Members of the subculture were known for embracing jazz and elements of western fashion.

== Name and etymology ==
In Polish culture the term bikini boys has developed similar connotations to the English language term beatnik, the label was first pejoratively applied by the communist authorities before being adopted by the subculture itself.

The name for the subculture derives from Bikini Atoll, rather than the bikini swimsuit. A common element of their clothing were neckties which featured exotic imagery, often palm trees or bikini-clad women on an exotic island with an atomic mushroom cloud in the background, assumed to be a reference to the explosion of the nuclear bomb at the Atoll.

Although English sources often translate the name bikiniarze into English as "bikini boys"; the Polish term is more gender- and age-neutral (lit. 'bikini people'). While it implies masculinity, the term does so less than the English translation suggests. Female members of the movement were called bikiniarka or kociak (lit. 'kitty').

== History ==
The subculture is sometimes considered to have begun amongst the youth of the intelligentsia in Warsaw however it soon spread to other urban areas of the country such as the Tricity and notably Nowa Huta in Kraków. The height of the subculture's popularity has generally been seen as reaching a peak in 1952. As the Polish thaw led to a liberalisation in the cultural sphere, the bikini boys petered out with some elements becoming absorbed into the cultural mainstream.

Notable bikini boys include the novelist Leopold Tyrmand, who helped popularise the subculture in his writing, and the film director Roman Polanski, who has referred to himself as an adherent of the bażant style, as a youth in Kraków.

=== Moral panic ===
Polish authorities lumped bikini boys with street hooligans into one category of undesirables. However the police, as the population as a whole, feared true hooligans, which were often dangerous indeed, therefore the police were mostly after harmless bikini boys.

In 1951, a court case involving four youths from Falenica in Warsaw, originally accused of theft, was dubbed the "trial of the bikini boys" when they were additionally charged with espionage and two of the group were subsequently sentenced to death. Following the trial, the bikini boys subculture became the target of an anti-American moral panic. The group of youths were derided on the pages of Sztandar Młodych as servants of American Imperialism. In a bulletin of the Polish Film Chronicle, the actor Andrzej Łapicki attacked the bikini boys for their apparent drunkenness, anti-social behaviour, and the vacuousness of their Westernised fashion.

Władysław Matwin, the chairman of the Union of Polish Youth (ZMP), called on his members to form themselves into ORMO platoons to physically confront bikini boys in the streets. Fighting between bikini boys and zetempowcy (a nickname derived from the acronym ZMP) became increasingly common with the former being targeted at dances and even having their hair and ties cut off. As a former member of the ZMP, the dissident Jacek Kuroń has said that activists were encouraged to physically confront bikini boys, and has recalled seeing such an assault perpetrated against a bikini boy who had attended a music event at Plac Komuny Paryskiej in the early 1950s.

== Etymology ==
The term "bikini boy" is believed to have derived from the neckties that were a noticeable visual element of the subculture. Such items were hand-painted with exotic images of the Bikini Atoll, occasionally referencing the atomic tests that took place there, and the emergence of the Atomic Age.

Female members of the subculture were sometimes known as kociaki (transl. kittens). Other names for the subculture included the derogatory bażant (transl. pheasant), and regional variations such as dżoller and biglarz in Kraków and Wrocław respectively.

== Style ==
The bikini boys often wore a quiff with hair combed down the back of the head; either a wide brimmed hat, colloquially known as a "pancake", or a flat cap stuffed with newspaper was worn; a long jacket, occasionally one made of corduroy, which was sometimes accompanied with a checkered shirt. Tight fitting trousers ending above the ankles were worn, revealing colourful socks, along with thick soled shoes. The outfit was matched with a wide necktie in a Windsor knot onto which tropical scenes or scantily clad women were hand painted. Male members of the subculture were often perceived to be effeminate due to their dress sense, which clashed with the idealised working class man of communist propaganda. Female adherents of the subculture dressed in narrow colourful skirts with a tight fitting blouse, scarf, and hair cut short.

Towards the late 1950s, the style of the bikini boys became more refined, emulating the perceived sophistication of the Parisian Rive Gauche. This look was to be deemed to be more socially acceptable and promoted in the magazine Przekrój.

== Analysis ==
Analysing Tyrmand's attire as a symbolic form of resistance, the poet Agnieszka Osiecka described his style as a declaration of individuality that acted as "a charter of human rights." While the writer Marek Hłasko described the youthful rebellion typical of the bikini boys as inherently political, there has been some dispute over what politics exactly the bikini boys represented. Some historians have portrayed the bikini boys as an anti-communist movement others have argued that they were, in fact, often enthusiastic supporters of the communist project. In this latter regard the subculture can be understood as a reaction against traditional social hierarchies, analogous to their British contemporaries the Teddy Boys for example, rather than the Stalinist system itself.

== Similar subcultures ==
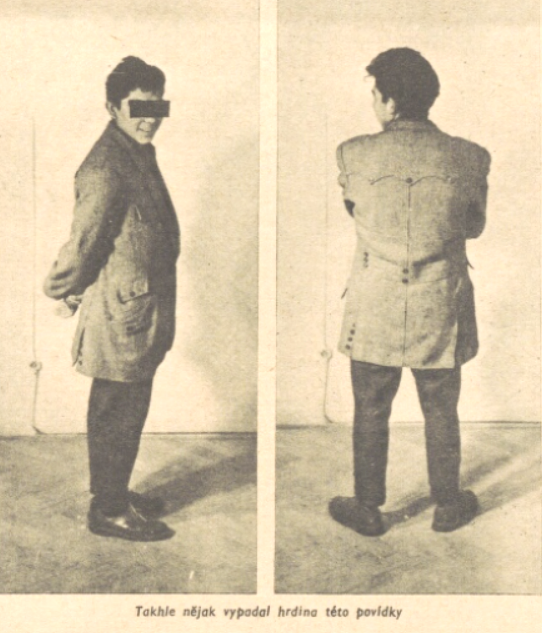
A Czech pásek, 1953

Their style and way of life corresponded to the stilyagi subculture of the Soviet Union. In particular, the modern Russian nostalgic musical film Stilyagi was dubbed as Bikiniarze in Polish cinema. The subculture has also been compared to English Teddy Boys and the French Zazous, and described as a part of a Europe-wide phenomenon.

A person that belonged to a similar Czech youth subculture of 1940–1970s was called pásek, who were preceded by potápky.

== See also ==
- 1940s in Western fashion
- 1950s in Western fashion
- Banana youth
- Halbstarke
- Jampec
- Tombakowa młodzież
