= History of modern Western subcultures =

The 20th century saw the rise and fall of many subcultures.

== 20th century ==
=== Fin de siècle ===
In the early part of the 20th century, subcultures were mostly informal groupings of like-minded individuals with the same views or lifestyle. The Bloomsbury group in London was one example, providing a place where the diverse talents of people like Virginia Woolf, Leonard Woolf, John Maynard Keynes, and E.M. Forster could interact. Other pre-World War I subcultures were smaller social groupings of hobbyists or a matter of style and philosophy amongst artists and bohemian poets. In Germany, from 1896, there developed a movement of young men (and later young women) which focused on freedom and natural environments. Called Wandervogel (translated as "hikers", "ramblers" or, more precisely, "migratory birds"), they wanted to throw off the strict rules of society and be more open and natural. The first known organized club for nudists, Freilichtpark (Free-Light Park), was opened near Hamburg, Germany, in 1903. In Italy, a popular art movement and philosophy called Futurism championed change, speed, violence and machines.

=== World War I ===
After the First World War (1914–18) hair styles changed: the wartime trenches were infested with lice and fleas, so soldiers were forced to shave their heads. Consequently, men with short hair appeared to have been at the front in the war, while men with longer hair might be thought of as pacifists and cowards, even suspected of desertion. Some artists managed to avoid the war by sitting it out in neutral Switzerland.

=== 1920s ===
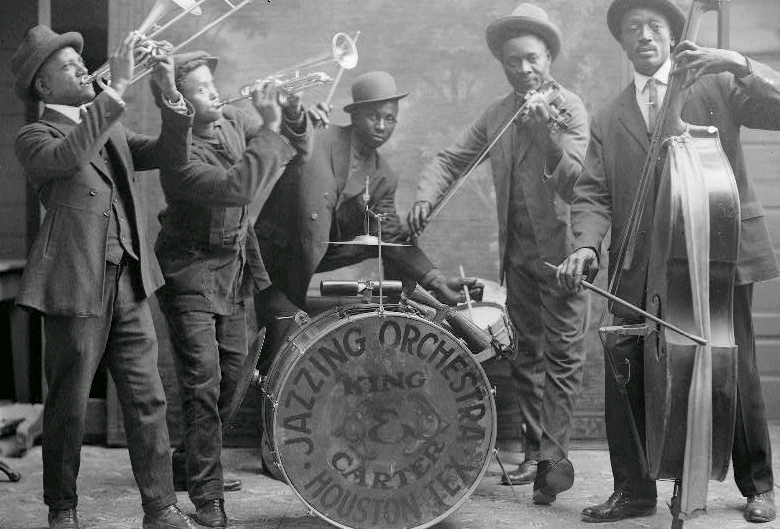
Jazz music, previously restricted to mainly poor African-Americans, broke out as the musical craze of the 1920s.

In the 1920s, American jazz music and motor cars were at the centre of a European subculture which began to break the rules of social etiquette and the class system (See also Swing Kids and Flappers). In America, the same "flaming youth" subculture was "running wild" but with the added complication of alcohol prohibition. Canada had prohibition in some areas, but for the most part, thirsty Americans coming over the border found an oasis. As a result, smuggling escalated as crime gangs became organized. In the southern United States, Mexico and Cuba were popular with drinkers. Thus, a drinking subculture grew in size and a crime subculture grew along with it. Other drugs were used as alternatives to alcohol. When prohibition ended, the subculture of drink, drugs and jazz did not disappear, and neither did the gangsters.

=== 1930s ===
The German nudist movement gained prominence in the 1920s, but was suppressed during the Nazi Gleichschaltung after Adolf Hitler came to power. Social nudism in the form of private clubs and campgrounds first appeared in the United States in the 1930s. In Canada, it first appeared in British Columbia about 1939 and in Ontario nine years later.

In the art world, Surrealism was attempting to shock the world with their games and bizarre behavior. The Surrealists were at one and the same time a serious art movement and a parody of other art forms and political movements. Surrealism had been developed by André Breton and others from the Dada movement. Based in several European countries, Surrealism was destined for trouble when the Nazis came to power. Subcultures and "degenerate art" were almost completely stamped out and replaced by the Hitler Youth.

In North America, the Great Depression caused widespread unemployment and poverty, and a consequent malaise among adolescents that found its expression in urban youth gangs—the so-called "dead end kids." The dead end kid phenomenon was fictionalized on the stage and screen where it became a popular image with which people could identify. Films featuring the Dead End Kids, East Side Kids, Little Tough Guys etc. were popular from the 1930s to the 1950s. The genre also found its expression in the kid gang comic book stories of Jack Kirby and Joe Simon, including the Boy Commandos and Newsboy Legion features.

The Dust Bowl disaster forced large numbers of rural Americans from Oklahoma and elsewhere to move their entire families to survive. They were labeled as "Okies" and treated poorly by the authorities in other states. Their refugee status was recorded in folk songs (including many by Woody Guthrie), as well as John Steinbeck's novel, The Grapes of Wrath, and the film adaptation starring Henry Fonda.

=== 1940s ===
Avant-garde artists like Max Ernst, Marcel Duchamp and Marc Chagall fled Europe following the outbreak of World War II. These artists arrived in the United States, where a subculture of surrealism and avant-garde experimentation developed in New York City, becoming the new centre of the art world.

American fashion remained gangster orientated, with gangs gravitating around immigrant and racial cultures. In California, Hispanic youth developed the distinctive zoot suit fashion, such as the black widows, women who dressed in black. The zoot suiters use of language involved rhyming and pig Latin (also known as backslang). This style, collectively known as Swing or Jive talk (see: Dictionary of Swing), included Afro-American, Cuban, Mexican and South American elements, as well as bits introduced by Slim Gaillard (see McVouty oreeney).

The entry of the United States into World War II was heralded by new legislation making zoot suits illegal due to the extra cloth required. In June 1943, white American servicemen stationed in Los Angeles rampaged through Mexican American neighborhoods, attacking young people wearing the suits and often stripping them, in what has become known as the Zoot Suit Riots. The riots in Los Angeles were part of a nationwide phenomenon of urban disturbances arising out of wartime tensions exacerbating longstanding racial discrimination in America. The Zoot Suit Riots were unique in that the fashions of the largely Mexican American (and some white and African-American) victims made them the target of white servicemen stationed in the city, many of whom were from southern white towns.

In Europe, black-marketeers prospered under rationing. Clothing styles depended on what could be begged or acquired by some means, not necessarily legal; There were restrictions everywhere. When the Americans arrived in Britain, black-marketeers, (called Wide boys or Spivs) made deals with GIs for stockings, chocolate, etc. Inevitably, subculture continued to have an image of criminality and the brave, the daring, the milieu, the resistance, etc. The black market in drugs thrived just about anywhere.

After the second war, the zoot suit craze spread to France in the form of the Zazou youths. Meanwhile, the intellectuals in France were forming an existentialist subculture around Jean-Paul Sartre and Albert Camus in Paris cafe culture.

In post-war America, folk songs and cowboy songs (also known, in those days, as hillbilly music) were beginning to be more popular with a wider audience. A subculture of rural jazz and blues fans had mixed elements of jazz and blues into traditional cowboy and folk song styles to produce a crossover called western swing. Thanks to the prevalence of radio, this music spread across the United States in the 1940s. Radio was the first almost instantaneous mass media with the power to create large subcultures by spreading the ideas of small subcultures across a wide area.

Bebop, a new jazz subculture, formed from the rebellion against the melodic stylings of swing; Notable players included Dizzy Gillespie and Charlie Parker. In turn, bebop spawned the hipster and Beat Generation subculture.

In 1947, Jack Kerouac made an epic journey across America, which he would describe in his 1957 novel, On the Road. In the same year, there was an incident involving a motorcycle gang at Hollister, California, and Harper's Magazine, published a story about it. In 1948, the Hells Angels formed in Fontana, California. The Hells Angels began as a motorcycle club looking for excitement in the dull times after the end of the war and became notorious as time passed. Motorcycle gangs in general began to hit the headlines. In 1953, the film, The Wild One, was released starring Marlon Brando.

=== 1950s ===
The Existentialists had a profound influence upon subcultural development. Jean-Paul Sartre and Albert Camus transferred their French resistance underground campaign to the context of a cultural revolution and the American Beat scene joined the movement. The emphasis on freedom of the individual influenced the Beats in America and Britain and this version of existential bohemianism continued through the 1950s and into the 1960s under the guise of the Beat Generation. Beards and longer hair returned in another attempt at returning to the image of peacetime man and the normality which had existed before the two wars. At the same time, as a result of American post-war prosperity, a new identity emerged for youth subculture: the teenager.

Jazz culture was transformed, by way of rhythm and blues into rock and roll culture. There are various suggested candidates for which record might have been the First rock and roll record. At the same time, jazz culture itself continued but changed into a more respected form, no longer necessarily associated with wild behaviour and criminality.

From the 1950s onward society noticed an increase in street gang culture, random vandalism and graffiti. Sociologists, psychologists, social workers and judges all had theories as to what was causing the increase to urban trouble, but it was later accepted that it developed in protest to the older generation's pro-white supremacy views. The consensus has generally tended to be that the modern urban environment offers all the bright lights and benefits of the modern world but often provides working class youths with little in reality. This theory and others were parodied in the musical West Side Story (based on Shakespeare's Romeo and Juliet) in song lyrics such as Jet Song, America, and Gee, Officer Krupke. Moral panics surrounding the advent of teenager subcultures and a perceived rise in adolescent criminality led to several attempts to investigate and legislate youth behavior, such as the Senate Subcommittee on Juvenile Delinquency. One of the many subcultures that was based around street violence was the greaser, a working class subculture that was a part of and influenced the biker subculture.

As American rock and roll arrived in the United Kingdom, a subculture grew around it. Some of the British post-war street youths hanging around bombsites in urban areas and getting drawn into petty crime began to dress in a variation of the zoot suit style called a drape suit, with a country style bootlace tie, winklepicker shoes, drainpipe trousers, and Elvis Presley style slicked hair. These youths were called Teddy boys. For a night out dancing at the palais, their girlfriends would usually wear the same sort of poodle skirts and crinolines their counterparts in America would wear. For day-to-day wear there was a trend toward girls wearing slacks or jeans. At the time, the idea of girls wearing trousers and boys taking time over their hairstyles was socially shocking to many people.

British youth divided into factions. There were the modern jazz kids, the trad jazz kids, the rock and roll teenagers and the skiffle craze. Coffee bars were a meeting place for all the types of youth and the coolest ones were said to be in Soho, London.

In Britain, the political side of the Beat Generation was the anti-nuclear movement led by CND. Ban the Bomb marches became a very successful British social phenomenon.

Teenage music and subculture was parodied in the 1957 play (and 1962 movie) The Music Man, particularly in the song "Ya Got Trouble".

In the United States and Australia, Hawaiian-influenced surfing was the new youth sport. A whole subculture grew around the sport and the associated parties, clothes, speech patterns and music. During the same time-frame skateboard riding developed as a parallel lifestyle to wave riding. Both forms of board riding continued throughout the remainder of the century and into the next. From these two sports young people learned to provide their own social structure within which they could display skills and excellence.

In the Congo Free State (now known as the Democratic Republic of the Congo), a youth subculture known as the Bills flourished, taking Western movies and cowboys as their main influence.

In the Netherlands, two youth groups evolved in big cities like Amsterdam, Rotterdam and Utrecht. One group, the Nozems, similar to the British Teds, and another called the Artistiekelingen, who can be compared to the bohemian artists of pre-world-war France. The Nozems spent their time listening to rock and roll music, driving motorcycles through town and picking up ladies while the Artistiekelingen would discuss philosophy, paint, draw and listen to jazz music.

=== 1960s ===
In the 1960s, the beats (AKA beatniks) grew to be an even larger subculture, spreading around the world. Other 1960s subcultures included radicals, mods, rockers, bikers, hippies and the freak scene. One of the main transitional features between the beat scene and the hippies was the Merry Pranksters' journey across the United States with Neal Cassady and Ken Kesey, in a psychedelically painted school bus named Further. In the US, the hippies' big year was 1967, including Summer of Love in San Francisco.

The rude boy culture originated in the ghettos of Jamaica, coinciding with the popular rise of rocksteady music, dancehall celebrations and sound system dances. Rude boys dressed in the latest fashions, and many were involved with gangs and violence. This subculture then spread to the United Kingdom and other countries.

The mod subculture began with a few cliques of trendy teenage boys in London, England in the late 1950s, but was at its most popular during the early 1960s. Mods were obsessed with new fashions such as slim-cut suits; and music styles such as modern jazz, rhythm and blues, soul, ska, and some beat music. Many of them rode scooters.

The mod and rude boy cultures both influenced the skinhead subculture of the late 1960s. The skinheads were a harder, more working class version of mods who wore basic clean-cut clothing styles and favoured ska, rocksteady, soul and early reggae music.

The disco scene originated in the 1960s, with discothèques such as the Whisky a Go Go and Studio 54.

Subcultures were often based on socializing and wild behaviour, but some of them were centred around politics. In the United States, these included the Black Panthers and the Yippies. Allen Ginsberg took part in several protest movements, including those for gay rights and those against the Vietnam War and nuclear weapons. In Paris, France, in May 1968, there was a university student uprising, supported by Jean-Paul Sartre and 121 other intellectuals who signed a statement asserting "the right to disobedience." The uprising brought the country to a standstill, and caused the government to call a general election rather than run the risk of being toppled from power.

The Hacker culture was beginning to form in the 1960s, due to the increased usage of computers at colleges and universities. Students who were fascinated by the possible uses of computers and other technologies began figuring out ways to make technology more freely accessible. The international Happening and Fluxus movements also had its beginnings in the 1960s, evolving out of the Beat subculture.

=== 1970s ===
In the 1970s, the hippie, mod and rocker subcultures were in a process of transformation, which temporarily took on the name of freaks (openly embracing the image of strangeness). A growing awareness of identity politics combined with the legalisation of homosexuality and a huge amount of interest in science fiction and fantasy forms of speculative writing produced the freak scene. Bands on the freak circuit cultivated an anti-capitalist, communal lifestyle. Freak bands like The Edgar Broughton Band or The Pink Fairies played at free festivals, spurning mainstream venues. The music/fashion subculture that became a commercial alternative to the freaks was glam rock. It was a continuation of the trendies of the 1960s mod culture, appealing to the androgynous trend of the 1970s.

At some point, some in the hacker/computer subculture took on the derogatory word geek with pride, in the same way the freaks had done. Computer usage was still a very inaccessible secret world to most people in those days, but many people were interested in computers because of their appearance in science fiction. The dream of one day owning a computer was a popular fantasy amongst science fiction fandom, which had grown from a minor subculture in the first half of the 20th century to a quite large contingent by the 1970s, along with horror fandom, comics fandom and fantasy freaks.

The skinhead subculture from the late 1960s continued into the 1970s, and some skinheads became influenced by the punk subculture. These skinheads became associated with the Oi! genre, and some skinheads became involved with far right politics, creating the white power skinhead scene (despite the fact that the original 1960s skinheads were influenced by black culture).

Disco, which had begun in gay dance clubs, became a significant from about 1975 onward. In some sectors, particularly in the New York City area, where disco had seemingly "taken over" all aspects of youth life, an aggressive counter-disco movement was born. New York area rock radio stations such as WPLJ and WPIX encouraged their listeners to destroy disco records and embrace rock and roll. Musically and lyrically, punk rock was the intentional antithesis of the disco scene, the progressive rock genre and the hippie subculture. Early punks played aggressive, quick-paced three-chord rock and roll songs.

Within the decay of the hippie subculture, some of the remaining branches of bikers progressively turned in metalheads with succeeding aesthetics of horror and violence of late 1960s that influenced progressive rock (hard rock) in the more obscure form of early heavy metal. Metalheads preserved the instituted use of long hair, took garments from leather culture of late 1970s and formed a culture on separatism and orthodoxy against mainstream.

In 1976, a hit song "Convoy" by C.W. McCall arrived in the pop charts and romanticised the Trucker and CB radio subculture. In 1978, the song inspired a film "Convoy" directed by Sam Peckinpah, and starring Kris Kristofferson, Ali MacGraw, Ernest Borgnine, and Burt Young. The word "convoy" and quotes from the song lyrics became part of a popular cultural image of people standing up for their freedom. Gradually, from the 1960s, 1970s and through into the 1980s, the cultural influences of the Merry Pranksters, the freak scene, the New Age movement and the Convoy idea seem to have coalesced into what became new age travellers.

Beginning around 1976, the anarcho-punk scene in the UK developed the band Crass and related bands, including The Poison Girls. The Crass Records label was an independent operation, enabling bands with an extremely raw sound to put out records when the major labels might not have bothered with them. Crass also organised gigs around the country for themselves and other bands, and campaigned politically for the anti-nuclear movement other causes.

Mods made a comeback in the late 1970s as a post-punk mod revival, inspired by The Jam and the British film Quadrophenia.

In 1979, Usenet was created as a medium of communication over the, still very primitive, Internet of the time. The Usenet and the Bulletin board system (BBS) subculture would become increasingly significant over the next few decades.

Also in 1979, Papa Wemba, a Rumba star in Zaire/Democratic Republic of the Congo, Africa began to be the leader of the Sapeur ('Société des Ambianceurs et des Personnes d'Élégance' thus 'SAPE' for short), which he promoted as a youth cult. Papa Wemba's music has been influenced by previous stars of Rumba music in Zaire (such as Papa Wendo) and also by his visits to Europe and by the appearance, in 1974, of James Brown at the Rumble in the Jungle. Wemba said:

The Sapeur cult promoted high standards of personal cleanliness, hygiene and smart dress, to a whole generation of youth across Zaire. When I say well-groomed, well-shaven, well-perfumed, it's a propriety that I am insisting on among the young. I don't care about their education, since education always comes first of all from the family.

=== 1980s ===
At the beginning of the 1980s, some of the followers of punk rock became bored with it and wanted to make it more stylish and introduce elements of glam. By 1981, this trend resulted in the development of the New Romantics, a group whose preferred music was synthesiser electropop. New Romantics tended to be slightly campy and fey, and visually there was an androgynous vibe to the subculture, regardless of the individual's sexual orientation. Clothing styles demonstrated a return to the freak scene's roleplay of fashions from previous eras or imagined future ones in order to use fashion to create a time warp. The New Romantics or "futurists" were christened "The Cult with No Name" by Robert Elms.

Other punk rock followers took the genre and culture further underground, where it evolved into a faster, harder genre coined as hardcore punk. Along with the hardcore scene came the straight edge subculture. Straight edge is a lifestyle that advocates abstinence in relation to tobacco, alcohol and recreational drug use (especially psychoactive and stimulant drug use), and for some people, in relation to promiscuous sexual behavior.

Other former punks searching for a new direction around 1979 eventually developed into the nucleus of what became the goth subculture. The goths are a subculture of dark dress and gloomy romanticism. Unlike the New Romantics, goth has lasted into the 21st century. In the UK, goth reached its popular peak in the late 1980s.

In American urban environments, a form of street culture using freeform and semi-staccato poetry, combined with athletic break dancing, was developing as the hip hop and rap subculture. In jazz jargon, the word rap had always meant speech and conversation. The new meaning signified a change in the status of poetry from an elitist artform to a community sport. Rappers could attempt to outdo each other with their skillful rhymes. Rapping is also known as MCing, which is one of the four main elements of Hip hop: MCing, DJing, graffiti art, and breakdancing. From the early to mid-1980s, poetry culture in a broader sense caught the same kind of energy as rap and so began the first of the poetry slams. Poetry slamming became an irregular focus for the latest wave of poetry aficionados.

In 1985, Stonehenge Free Festival was disrupted by a massive police presence attempting to prevent the festival and break up the Peace Convoy. The resulting Battle of the Beanfield was the largest mass civil arrest in English history.

Free parties and raves began from the mid-80s and became a flourishing subculture. The music embraced by this subculture was electronic dance music which developed from techno, pioneered in Detroit and Chicago by people like Juan Atkins, Derrick May, and Kevin Saunderson, as well as electronic music, pioneered by Karlheinz Stockhausen, John Cage and others, taken by way of progressive rock bands like Hawkwind, filtered through the sounds of dub-reggae and the electropop bands like Kraftwerk and Depeche Mode and given a different twist via Art of Noise and early hip hop and recycled psychedelia. Towards the end of the 80s rave culture had diversified into different forms connected to music such as Acid House and Acid Jazz and would continue to diversify into the 90s. Rave culture thrived from the mid-80s to the end of the century and beyond.

The Usenet and BBS subculture had developed a subculture which involved its own forms of etiquette and behaviour patterns both social and anti-social and the phenomena of trolling, spamming, flaming etc. The computer subculture was also influenced by fictional subcultures in cyberpunk literature.

=== 1990s ===
The term Generation X or Gen X, popularized by Douglas Coupland's novel Generation X: Tales for an Accelerated Culture, was used to describe the generation that followed the Baby boomers, or those who came to adulthood in the 1980s and 1990s. In the UK, the Britpop scene arose in the 1990s, influenced by the 1960s mods, the 1970s/1980s mod revival, and other British rock music and subcultural styles. On the West Coast of the United States became popular a style of alternative rock known as Grunge, pioneered by bands like Nirvana, Soundgarden and Mudhoney, which developed his associated subculture. One of the main technological developments of the 1990s was the World Wide Web. Running on the older infrastructure of the Internet, the web allowed small subcultures to grow into large global online communities. Online game communities, forums, chat rooms and Internet cafes became popular. The 1990s saw the rise of the anti-globalization movement. This was a response to the increased impact of globalisation and global capitalism. The anti-globalisation protest movement was accompanied by the fair trade movement.

== 21st century ==
"The 2010s has seen the rise of subcultures that exist largely or entirely online, as divergent as vaporwave, ASMR, UK drill, and makeup tutorials, but all of them nesting within huge platforms like YouTube or Bandcamp. Something like audio blogs or DIY radio, podcasts have become the focus of new communities. And the slow collapse of a centralising and synchronised common culture has opened up the space for a profusion of micro-scenes, each running on its own timeline. In this flourishing post-geographical world of "local" cultures not tied to location, small is bountiful and significance doesn’t need to be universal to matter."

— Simon Reynolds,

The 2000s and early 2010s saw millennials coming of age. Subcultures that emerged or became popular in the first decade of the 21st century included Emo, Scene and Chav. The Emo subculture, rooted in the Post Hardcore genre of hardcore punk, changed over the years becoming more mainstream, following the commercial success in early '2000s. The contemporary hipster became prominent in the 2010s. On March 20, 2014, Alexis Petridis, a journalist for the British newspaper The Guardian, claimed that subcultures were rapidly declining, with only Emos and metalheads having any visual significance.

Throughout the mid to late 2010s, subcultures splintered and merged due to the widespread accessibility of the internet and social media platforms. Many 2010s subcultures drew from previously existing groups - the popular 'e-girl' subculture is seen as a modern spin on mid-2000s scene fashion. As part of their retrospective series on the 2010s, Dazed magazine described the impact of technology on subcultures; "But [the internet] also gave us more; it gave us dozens upon dozens of scenes and movements, only recognisable to the highly trained eye. And the rules became less rigid: you could dress one way, and listen to totally different music." Modern subcultures include e-girls, Koreaboos, art hoes, hypebeasts, Instagram baddies, soft boys, skaters, and revivals of 1970s-1990s subcultures such as hippies, goths, punks, and grunge.

== See also ==
- History of sexuality
- Music history
- Post-industrial society
- Sexuality and gender identity-based cultures
- Subculture & List of subcultures
- Far-right subcultures
