= Diary 1954 =

Book by Leopold Tyrmand

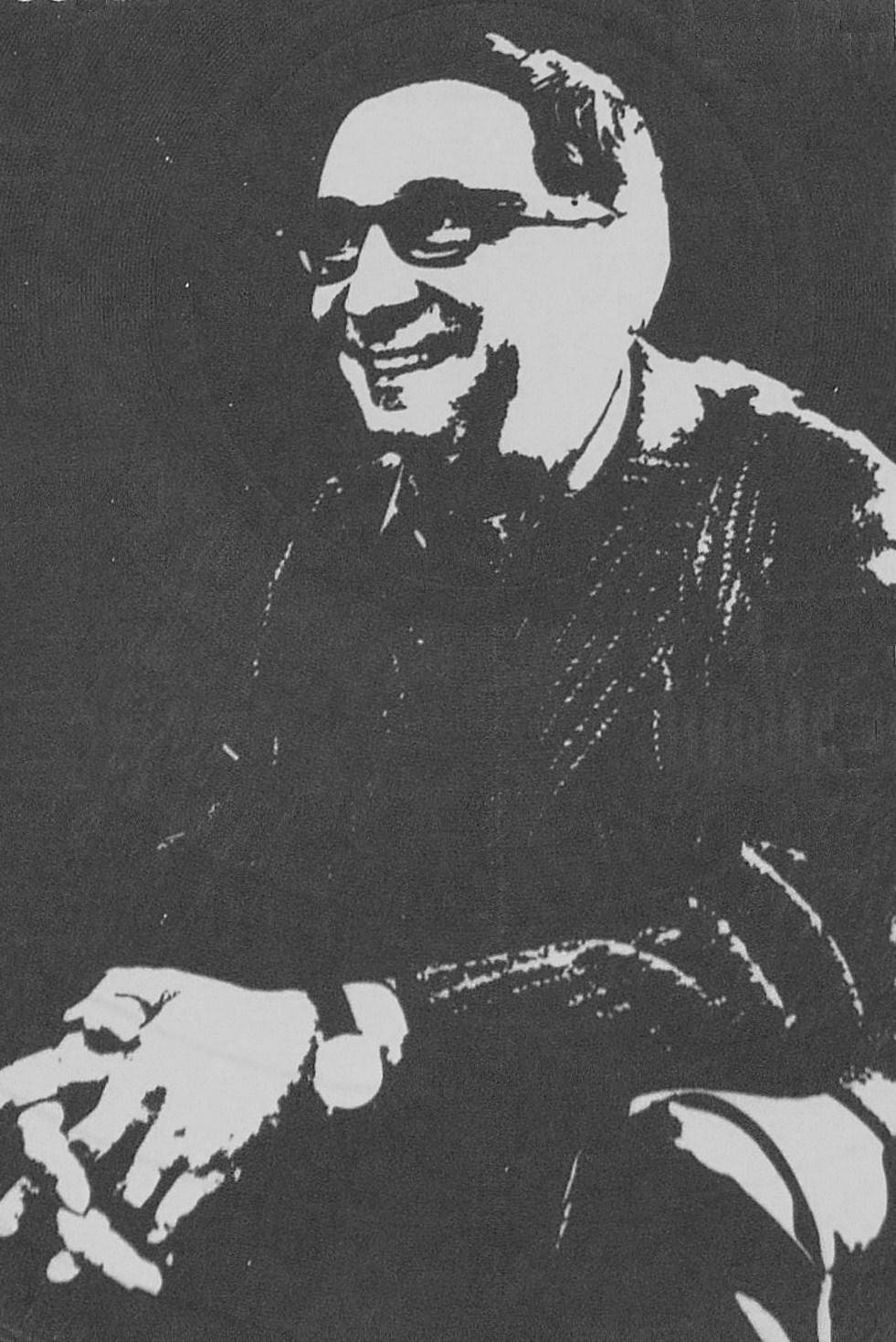
Leopold Tyrmand

Diary 1954 (Polish: Dziennik 1954) is a book written by Polish author Leopold Tyrmand containing notes from his personal diary he penned during the first three months of 1954.

== Creation and publication history ==
The diary was created more than half a year after Tyrmand lost his job at the Tygodnik Powszechny magazine (lit. The Catholic Weekly) – along with all of the other editors – for his refusal to publish the official version of Joseph Stalin's obituary dictated by the Polish communist authorities, following Stalin's death in March 1953. Tyrmand and his co-workers then received an unofficial ban on working in the print media. He went on to earn his living from part-time and freelance jobs, including giving private lessons, occasional copy writing, and selling his stories for screenplays.

His diary notes included in the book were taken almost daily between 1 January and 2 April 1954, and occupied 800 pages. The very last paragraph of the book breaks off in the middle of a sentence. Tyrmand explained this years later: "The last evening, tired with writing, as it often happened, I broke off the sentence intending to return to it the next day. But I never did. The next day Czytelnik [publishing house] offered me a contract to write [the novel] Zły. Initially I was going to continue the diary, but the days passed by, suddenly full of the different circumstances and requirements."

In 1956, Tygodnik Powszechny published a fragment of the diary. After his emigration in 1965, Tyrmand deposited the diary in the editorial office of the Paris-based polish magazine Kultura, returning to collect it four years later.

Tyrmand resumed editing his notes in 1973. Fragments of his diary were first published in the London Polish-language periodical Wiadomości between 1974 and 1978. The first book edition appeared in London in 1980, published by the Polonia Book Fund. Introduction to the first edition included the following sentence: "Present book contains the entirety of the diary, unaffected by editorial considerations, moral quandaries, political necessities, social concessions." Meanwhile, the cover displayed a photo of the manuscript, on which the text did not match the book's content. Notice has also been taken of English translation calques and style clumsiness. Many interlocutors of Mariusz Urbanek, author of a later book on Tyrmand, Zły Tyrmand, were convinced that nearly all of the diary was created in the United States after Tyrmand had settled there in 1966. On the other hand, Literatura Polska 1939-91 characterises this publication as an apocrypha.

It was only in 1999 that the original version of the diary, based on the notes made public by Tyrmand's wife and kept at Stanford University, was issued.

The 1980 edition of Dziennik 1954 has been translated into English by Anita K. Shelton and A. J. Wrobel and published as Diary 1954 by Northwestern University Press (Chicago, 2014, ISBN 978-0-8101-2951-1). It was a finalist for the 2015 AATSEEL Book Prize for Best Translation into English.

== Contents ==
Tyrmand analyses the person of himself, his life and decisions taken, spending the bulk of the book analysing Poland in the Stalinism period, in which he lived by then.

In the book, Tyrmand, although self-described as a firm anti-communist, does not get involved in neither political nor ideological arguments against communism. Polish writer Józef Hen observed: "In the Diary, there is not a single word about the exiles, trials, Tito, Korea, spies, jail tortures". Sometimes Tyrmand expresses himself almost positively, for example about Vladimir Lenin. The criticism of the political system prevailing in Poland is concerned with its civilisational and aesthetical aspects. For instance in a few places Tyrmand complains about a dirt plague in Warsaw.

Diary contains a lot of personal criticism of both Tyrmand's acquaintances (their identities often hidden behind initials) as well as public figures. The brunt of his criticism is directed at moral attitudes of Polish artists, whom he considered lackeys of the state. Tyrmand engages in a dispute on the writings of Ernest Hemingway with film critic Zygmunt Kałużyński. He also describes in detail his discussions with his friend Stefan Kisielewski. Throughout the diary some 570 names appear, including those of the people which were only beginning to be widely known at the time, including Stanisław Lem, Zbigniew Herbert, Jan Lenica, and Julia Hartwig.

Descriptions of love and sex affairs of Tyrmand abound. In a relationship at that time with an 18-year-old girl (in the first edition named 'Bogna', in the original 'Krystyna'), the author also goes back to his earlier affairs. Many of the situations depicted in Diary were used by the author later in his novels Zły and Życie towarzyskie i uczuciowe.

The editorial changes in the first edition of the book were made to adjust Tyrmand's image so that it fits better with the one he created in the United States in the 1970s. The writer set store by showing his views' constancy over the numerous years, "This diary, written at full manhood, re-read at the twilight of midlife, gives me a feeling of self-loyalty – which always seemed to me as desirable and worthy of sacrifices." The 1970s corrections also consisted in elaboration and enrichment of some accounts, for instance the council in Związek Literatów Polskich.

A biographer Henryk Dasko notes that Diary 1954 would play a substantial role in autocreation of the legend of Tyrmand as an independent and unwavering creator.

== Editions ==
- first abroad: Polonia Book Fund, Londyn 1980
- first official in Poland: Res Publica, 1989, ISBN 83-7046-008-9 (some texts like those about Soviet Union leaders were removed by censorship)
- original version prepared and prefaced by Henryk Dasko
  - Tenten, 1995, ISBN 83-86628-04-9
  - Prószyński&S-ka, Warszawa 1999, ISBN 83-7255-238-X (2nd edition)
- English translation of the 1980 version, by Anita K. Shelton and A. J. Wrobel, Northwestern University Press, Chicago, 2014, ISBN 978-0-8101-2951-1.

== Bibliography ==
- Henryk Dasko, Wstęp do "Dziennika 1954", s. 3-34, Warszawa 1999, ISBN 83-7255-238-X
- Leopold Tyrmand, Wstęp do "Dziennika 1954", wyd. Res Publica, 1989.
- Mariusz Urbanek, Zły Tyrmand, Słowo, Warszawa 1992.
