= Leopold Tyrmand =

Polish novelist, writer, and editor

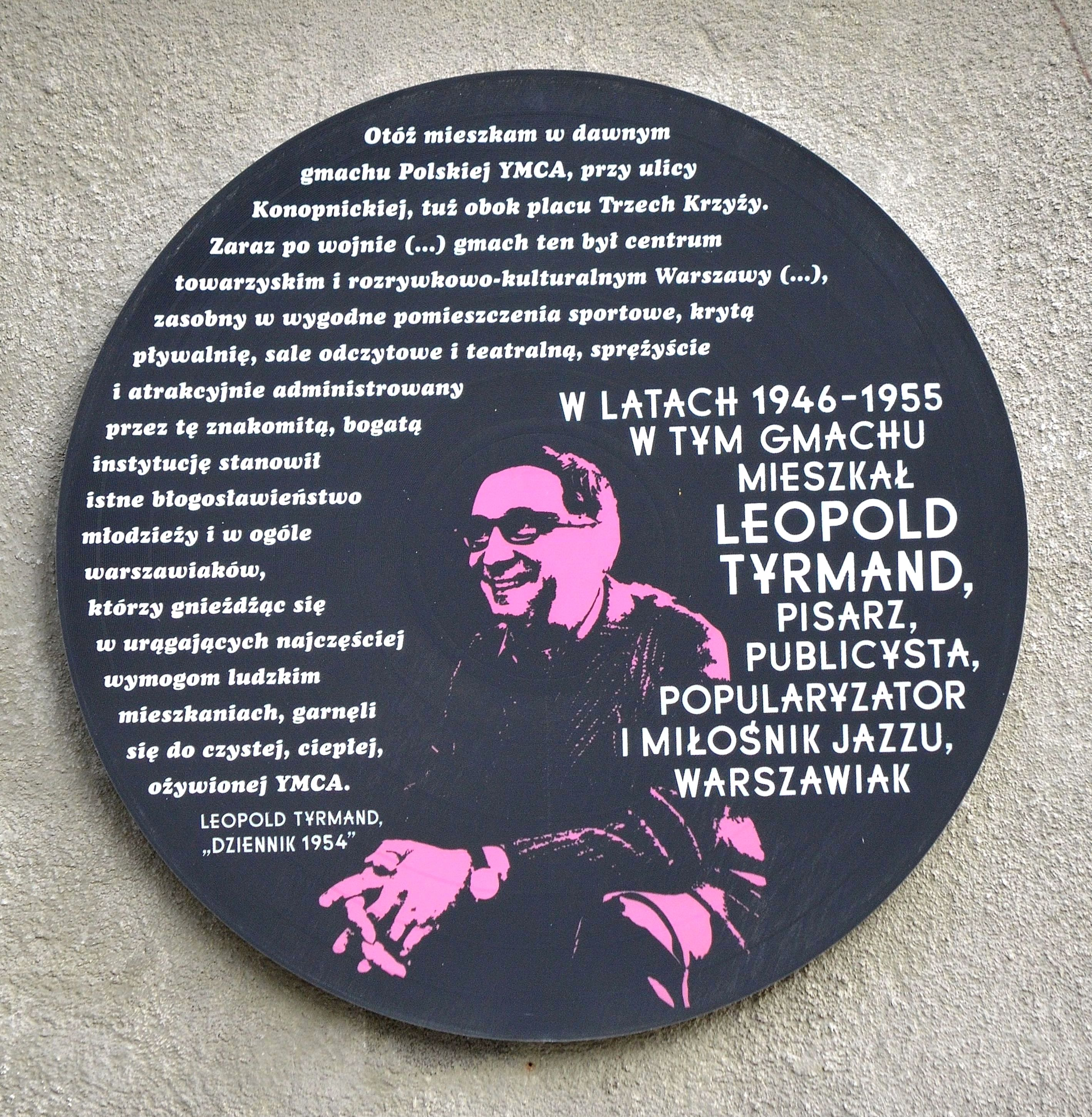
- Plaque in memory of Leopold Tyrmand at 6 Konopnickiej Street in Warsaw, where he lived from 1946 to 1955
- Born: May 16, 1920, Warsaw, Poland
- Died: 19 March 1985 (aged 64), Fort Myers, Florida, United States
- Citizenship: United States
- Occupations: Novelist, journalist
- Spouse(s): Małgorzata Rubel-Żurowska (1955 – ?); Barbara Hoff (1957–1965); Mary Ellen Fox (1971–1985)
- Children: Matthew Tyrmand (b. 1981), Rebecca.
- Writing career
- Language: Polish
- Period: 1948–1985
- Genres: Novel, autobiographical novel, crime fiction
- Notable works: Diary 1954; The Man With White Eyes

Leopold Tyrmand (May 16, 1920 – March 19, 1985) was a Polish novelist, writer, and editor. Tyrmand emigrated from Poland to the United States in 1966 and five years later married an American, Mary Ellen Fox. He served as editor of an anti-communist monthly Chronicles of Culture with John A. Howard. Tyrmand died of a heart attack at the age of 64 in Florida.

== Life ==
=== Youth ===
Leopold Tyrmand was born to a Polish Jewish assimilated secular family in Warsaw, son to Mieczyslaw Tyrmand and Maria (Maryla) née Mańska or Oliwenstein. His father had a wholesale leather business.

His paternal grandfather, Zelman Tyrmand, was a member of the management board of Warsaw's Nożyk Synagogue.

In 1938 he matriculated at Warsaw's Jan Kreczmar Gymnasium. He went to Paris, where he studied for a year at the faculty of architecture at the Académie des Beaux-Arts, the Academy of Fine Arts. There he met for the first time Western European culture and American jazz. Both of these fascinations left a lasting mark on his work.

=== World War II ===
Tyrmand was on vacation in Warsaw when the War broke out, so he interrupted his studies and worked in smuggling in the area of the Western Bug, helping people to cross from Nazi Germany to the Soviet Union.

Tyrmand later managed to flee to Vilnius as a refugee, and after the Soviet occupation of 1940, he began working with local media, most notably with Prawda Komsomolska, a Soviet propaganda medium. During this time, he met the Polish journalist Andrzej Miłosz (brother of the Polish writer Czesław Miłosz). At that time Andrzej Miłosz was collaborating with the Home Army (a movement of Polish Resistance), and reproached Tyrmand for writing for a Russian propaganda outlet.

During the war, Tyrmand was a resistance fighter in Poland. In spring 1941 he was arrested by the NKVD secret police in Vilnius and sentenced to 8 years in prison. However, he managed to escape from a bombed train after the German invasion of the Soviet Union in June of that year. Tyrmand escaped from Russia to later return to Vilnius, identifying as a French citizen.

To escape the Holocaust, Tyrmand traveled on false papers to Germany. He worked as a waiter while in Germany; an experience he wrote about in his semi-autobiographical novel "Filip".

He tried to escape to neutral Sweden, but was caught in Norwegian port of Stavanger, and sent to the Grini concentration camp in Norway, where he managed to survive the rest of the war.

==== Family ====
As for his family during the Second World War, Tyrmand's parents were transported by the German occupiers to their Majdanek Concentration Camp, where his father was murdered. In addition to his father, Tyrmand lost his entire family to the war except for his mother and an uncle.

Although his mother Maria (Polish diminutive: Marysia) survived the war, she lost the rest of her entire family in the Warsaw Ghetto, with the exception of her son Leopold. Eventually his mother migrated to Israel and married Meyer Hershkoviz.

=== After World War II ===
After the war and before he returned to a devastated Poland, Tyrmand worked with the Norwegian Red Cross.

==== Censorship ====
In 1950, during the years of Stalinism in Poland, Tyrmand was removed from the editorial board of the popular Przekrój magazine for a review of a boxing tournament in which he criticized the Russian judges for their pro-Soviet bias and unfair decisions that spurred protests among the boxing fans that led to police intervention.

With the help of an old friend, Stefan Kisielewski, he found work in the Catholic Tygodnik Powszechny magazine. However, in March 1953, Tygodnik Powszechny closed after refusing to print the official obituary of Stalin in 1953.

Tyrmand then suffered from an unofficial ban on publications.

==== Dziennik 1954 ====
In 1954 Tyrmand started a diary and, due to the frustration associated with forced inactivity, he transferred his writing to this diary which recounts the first three months of 1954. The text was later edited and released in 1980 as "Dziennik 1954".

While Tyrmand was perceived as an opponent of communism and the socialist systems, the diary makes little mention of politics, focusing instead in a sarcastic condemnation of society and the cultural and economic backwardness of the Polish People's Republic.

The log, which gives a unique description of the daily life in Stalinist Poland, also contains harsh judgments about the many forms of contemporary cultural scene and even spares no descriptions of his own love affairs.

In March 2014 the book was translated into English as Diary 1954 and is now considered to be one of his greatest works.

==== Writing career ====
Tyrmand discontinued writing his diary in April 1954, when he was commissioned to write Zły (published in English as "The Man With White Eyes"), a novel about the post-war Warsaw crime world released in December 1955. It quickly became a bestseller, and was regarded as one of the forerunners of the thaw in Polish literature.

He published the first part of mini-novella "Wędrówki i myśli porucznika Stukułki" ("Thoughts and Journeys of Lieutenant Stukułka") and a collection of short stories "Gorzki smak czekolady Lucullus" ("The Bitter Taste of Lucullus Chocolate").

==== Marriages ====
In April 1955, he married an art student Małgorzata Rubel-Żurowska, but their marriage did not last long. By 1957, Tyrmand had a second wife, fashion designer Barbara Hoff. The writer, known for his uncompromising and unconventional lifestyle (he was famous for his colorful socks known as bikiniarze), became the leader of the emerging jazz movement in Poland. He organized festivals and concerts, and released a monograph on jazz.

==== Jazz Scene ====
Tyrmand was instrumental in popularizing jazz in communist Poland, and was considered the "guru" of the Polish jazz movement.

He helped to start and coined the name of "Jazz Jamboree" in 1958, a Polish jazz festival that continues to this day as one biggest and oldest of its genre in Europe.

The festival, whose first theme song he picked ("Swanee River") attracted notables of jazz from the West. To Tyrmand, jazz was a declaration of freedom, and thus a political statement.

==== Departure from Poland ====
Despite the success and national recognition, the period from 1957 to 1963 was particularly rough for the author due to government censorship after the tightening of internal policies by the government of Władysław Gomułka.

In 1961 "Filip" was the last novel that Tyrmand managed to publish in Poland, but only after many delays. After that, the publication of "Siedem dalekich rejsów" ("Seven Long Voyages") was denied, along with renewals of already published work.

In the first half of the 1960s, Tyrmand completed "Życie towarzyskie i uczuciowe" ("A Social and Emotional Life"), which (like some of his previous works) was a critic of the Polish cultural scene of the time, but in this book Tyrmand was much clearer in his political position and more direct in his accusations against the regime.

Finally, Tyrmand was able to get a passport after being denied one since 1958. In 1965 he left Poland, and hinged his return on whether the Polish government would allow the publication of A Social and Emotional Life, which it did not.

=== Emigration and life in United States ===
Tyrmand emigrated to the United States in 1966. In the United States, Tyrmand lived in New York City and New Canaan, Connecticut, until 1976.

In 1971, he married Mary Ellen Fox, a doctoral candidate at Yale University.

Mary Ellen Tyrmand co-authored a book, published in Poland in 2012 titled: "Tyrmandowie Romans Amerykanski." The book traces their relationship via the letters to each other beginning with their meeting in 1970 until his death.

Tyrmand regularly published essays in American periodicals such as The New Yorker, The New York Times, Commentary and The American Scholar.

He became the co-founder and vice-president of the Rockford Institute, a conservative foundation critical of American publishing values and their apparent bias toward liberal writers. Tyrmand also served as editor of Chronicles of Culture, an anti-communist, paleoconservative journal.

=== Death ===
Tyrmand died of a heart attack in Fort Myers, Florida at the age of 64 on March 19, 1985. He was survived by his wife, Mary Ellen, and his children, Rebecca and the investor and consultant Matthew Tyrmand.

== Works ==
=== Hotel Ansgar ===
Collection of war short stories published in 1948.

=== Diary 1954 ===
Diary 1954 (Polish: Dziennik 1954) is a semi-autobiographical chronicle that analyzes the life in the Communist Poland and exposes the lies and absurdities of Soviet Russia backed regimes.

Although Tyrmand had put aside work on the book, he resumed it after an independent media outlet (Tygodnik Powszechny) he was collaborating with was forced to close after refusing to publish an obituary and mourn Stalin's death.

=== The Man With White Eyes ===
The Man With White Eyes (Polish: Zły) is a crime and romance novel in which the protagonist fights organized crime anonymously in Warsaw to defend the weak.

Published in 1955, The Man With White Eyes broke with the socialist realism in Poland by showing that under an officially promoted image of Warsaw, a world of crime existed untouched by an inefficient police.

The book was Tyrmand's biggest success and one of the most successful novels in Poland in the 1950s, to the point that it ran out copies in weeks and it reached up to 10 and even 20 times the purchase price in the black market.

Later it became also an international hit (especially in the Eastern Bloc) and was translated into more than 20 European languages.

=== Seven Long Voyages ===
Seven Long Voyages (Polish: Siedem Dalekich Rejsów) was completed in the late 1950s.

The Polish government didn't allow its publication accusing the book of being "pornographic and supportive of private initiative".

=== Social and Emotional life ===
Social and Emotional Life (Polish: Życie Towarzyskie i Uczuciowe) was finished in the first half of the 1960s.

The novel is critical of the moral environment of the Polish intelligentsia of the time, exposing them as servile and subservient to the regime.

The book is written in the form of a "roman à clef", which is a novel with fictional characters that can be easily identified as counterparts of real-life people, in this case, names from the Polish cultural scene at the time.

Tyrmand had aspirations for the book to become his magnum opus, but the government didn't allow its publication, and despite eventually being published in Paris, the book went mostly unnoticed.

=== Other books ===
Tyrmand books include Kultura Essays, Explorations in Freedom, Notebooks of a Dilettante, and On the Border of Jazz.

== Recognition ==
On April 25, 2019, the Lower House of the Polish parliament proclaimed 2020 as the year of Leopold Tyrmand. The year was selected for being the centenary of the author's birth.

== See also ==
- Anti-communist resistance in Poland
- Censorship in Communist Poland
- Culture.pl
- Jazz Jamboree
- Tygodnik Powszechny
