= Jampec =

Hungarian subculture

- A caricature of a Jampec that was displayed in a state department store on Rákóczi Avenue. The image was published in Time in 1950
- Years active: 1950s–1960s
- Country: Hungarian People's Republic

A jampec ([ˈjɒmpɛt͡s]) or jampi is someone associated with the Hungarian youth movement, from the Rákosi-era. It was a counter cultural movement, mainly consisting of middle-class inner-city young adults, especially in the 50s and 60s. It comes from the Yiddish word jampoc meaning crazy or stupid. They became known as a hooligan group.

The word describes youth who dresses unusually and copies Western fashion trends, in particular the casual clothing. In contrast to the utilitarian approach in design of consumer products in the Warsaw Pact, the fashion of the jampec promoted lavishness and fast fashion. It was heavily inspired by the portrayal of the West in Western media, which idealized the American way of life, which the younger generation relied on because they had no prior experience about the life there. Because of this, it blended elements of rocker and preppy.

The term "jampecos", is derived from it and means cool or daring. But the word itself has negative connotations nowadays, defining someone useless, lazy, wild, lacking introspection, unable to make their own decisions. The subculture has also become synonymous with anything that is unoriginal, cliché, following the masses for following western pop culture.

"I can't bring flowers, all the jampec would, but they expect something original from me." (Frigyes Karinthy: Bodri)

== History ==
The word first appeared in printing in 1928. The movement was born out of urbanization processes, when due to parental neglect, by the early 1950s many minors from poor families were socialized on the streets, while their parents worked in factories. The urban youth wanted to isolate themselves from the countryside, which they perceived as not westernized enough. Although their crime rate is negligible, vandalism was often committed. In the mid-1950s, they smashed 300–350 street lamps every month in Dunaújváros. In response, state council members designated a street for the children to vandalize (the idea was not a success and was scrapped). The subculture, of course, included not only the working class but also the middle class. Western, fast-paced dancing (rumba, jitterbug) kept the community together (although the State Councils did not like this behaviour, they allowed the children to use the community centre for this purpose and considered building a separate children's' dance hall). Many of them also later took part in the 1956 revolution, some were as young as 12.

By 1950 the wearing of patent leather shoes, parfumes, lipsticks, make-up and nail varnish and other "selfish fashion items" were considered "bourgeois habits". Cheapness and minimalism became the determining factors in the choice of clothes. In contrast, the Jampecs wore colorful, bourgeois clothing akin to Western fashion. They generally wore colorful ties, platform shoes, plaid blazers or leather jackets, zoot suits, a red speckled scarf, and their hair was cut to rockabilly. A lot of Hungarian slang is derived from it, for example fakabátos ("wooden coater") describes policemen (the name is a reference to sentry boxes). The slangs function was for the community to remain discreet, so a lot of Budapest place names were also referred to by nicknames. Although most jampec were known to be apolitical and simply a follower of western dance culture and fashion, in the larger Hungarian cities of the 1950s they often formed gangs, carried guns and attacked police officers, especially in the 30s. They also listened to jazz (and rock and roll in the late 50s), which was deemed anti-socialist. The state made fun of the behaviour and dress of the subculture. In clothing shop windows, a chimpanzee puppet was placed next to the jampi outfits, implying that they were similar. Their cultural icon was Tóni Swing (played by Imre Pongrácz), a character in the 1950 Hungarian musical film Singing Makes Life Beautiful. He was a comic-relief character who was more interested in leisure and having a good time than building a communist future.

== In culture ==
- The word "jampec" was also often adopted by members of the subculture as a nick-surname for example "Miklós Jampec Bérczi".
- Tibor Talpassy wrote the book The Jampec in 1935.
- The 1950 Hungarian film Singing Makes Life Beautiful portrays Tóni Swing as stupid but nice individual.
- An aggressive gang of jampecs appeared the 1953 Hungarian comedy film Kiskrajcár.
- In the 1953 Hungarian film Young Hearts the jampecs are portrayed as criminals.
- Two jampec has also appeared in the 2012 Hungarian film Tüskevár, based on the popular book by István Fekete.

== See also ==
- Bikini boys
- Culture of Hungary
- Halbstarke
- Jazz
- Stilyagi
- Teddy Boys
- Zoot suit
