= Heinz Lord =

Lord, left, accepts the title of WMA Secretary-General from outgoing Louis Bauer, 1961.

Heinz Lord (March 21, 1917 – February 4, 1961) was a German-American surgeon. A survivor of the Nazi concentration camps, Lord was elected Secretary-General of the World Medical Association shortly before his death in 1961.

Lord, a Peruvian citizen of Swiss and German descent, was born in Germany, grew up in Hamburg and studied in Zurich, Berlin and Hamburg, receiving his first degree at the University of Hamburg in 1942. He was involved in the Swing Kids subculture, persecuted by Nazi authorities. For his poorly disguised anti-Nazi sentiments and for his contacts with a British Secret Service agent, Lord was arrested in 1943 and interned at Neuengamme concentration camp, a "correctional" institution set up according to Robert Ritter' theory of race hygiene. In April 1945, as the Allies invaded Hamburg, Lord and thousands of other prisoners were herded by the Nazis onto several cruise ships (including the former luxury liner Cap Arcona), sailed a few kilometers off the coast of Hamburg into a British-declared free fire zone, and were abandoned by their German guards. RAF bombers sank all the vessels. Lord was apparently on one of the smaller ships. According to cited 1961 articles in Canadian Medical Association Journal etc., "he was one of 28 survivors out of 800 inmates of the ship". He and the other few survivors leaped overboard before the bombers struck, and swam several miles to shore. Thousands of others were either killed by the bombing or drowned.

Lord returned to Hamburg and resided there until 1954, completing his specialist degrees in surgery and urology, and an internship at professor Degkwitz' clinic for the children. He was credited with reestablishment of the Marburger Bund and reintroducing American popular music to post-war Hamburg scene.

In 1954 Lord emigrated to the United States. In 1957, after three years of residency at Bridgeport, Connecticut Hospital, he obtained a U.S. professional license and opened a surgical practice in Barnesville, Ohio. He was a member of American Medical Association, fellow of International College of Surgeons and member of the German Urological Society.

In December 1960 Lord was elected Secretary-General of the World Medical Association following the retirement of its founder Louis H. Bauer. However, on February 3, 1961, he collapsed at the AMA convention in Chicago and died on the following morning. His death at the age of 43 of a heart failure was linked to chronic effects of captivity.
