= Influence of Western culture in the Soviet Union =

Western culture influenced Soviet life and culture in many ways. From the 1950s until the 1980s this influence was manifested in a widespread fascination with Western manufactured goods, films, music, fashion and ideas. This fascination was condemned by the Soviet authorities and was described as "idol worshiping the West" (идолопоклонство перед Западом / idolopoklonstvo pered Zapadom) and similar phrases.

The informal word zagranitsa (Russian: заграница, IPA: [zəɡrɐˈnʲit͡sə], "the abroad") (Note: The noun заграница is derived from the phrase за границей, "beyond the border". A more literary equivalent is зарубежье, "zarubezhye") refers to the real or imagined world beyond domestic borders of the Soviet Union and, during the late Soviet period, to an idealized, imaginary West that lay beyond the borders of the Soviet Union. Alexei Yurchak, in his 2006 book Everything Was Forever, Until It Was No More: The Last Soviet Generation, describes the perception of zagranitsa by the Soviet people as an "imaginary elsewhere" that was "simultaneously knowable and unattainable, tangible and abstract, mundane and exotic". The idea of zagranitsa as utopia, at once an aspiration, a negation, and a reflection of the Soviet Union itself, became embedded into Soviet culture and identity.

Once travel to the United States became more accessible with Perestroika, the "imaginary West" lost its mythical connotations, resulting in disappointment and disillusionment. As Svetlana Boym writes of the 1985 hit song "The Last Letter" (also known as "Goodbye Amerika") by Russian rock group Nautilus Pompilius, bidding farewell to the United States— that is, "the beloved Amerika of Soviet underground culture… the mythical West of the Russian imagination"—was as painful as bidding farewell to Soviet culture itself and the "utopian fantasy land of one's youth".

== Background ==
According to Maurice Hindus (writing in 1953), the word zagranitsa had always "exercised a spell" over ordinary Russians, due to the vastness of the country, the enforced isolationism of living in villages, and the restriction of movement under Soviet rule. For centuries, Russians had been granted glimpses of zagranitsa and the West through the "window" opened by Peter the Great, as well as the reports of the privileged few who were able to go abroad and the rare appearance of aliens who visited Russia. The majority of the country remained generally closed to foreign influence until World War II. The war brought an influx of Western goods into the Soviet Union due to foreign relief efforts and the Lend-Lease policy enacted in 1941, and the "traditional hunger for knowledge of the mysterious zagranitsa was sharpened". Hindus writes:

Never before had Russians been so conscious of zagranitsa, so close to it, so excited about it, so responsive to it. Never before had zagranitsa descended on them so concretely… Now it was not merely to be wondered at, but, however, indirectly, to be seen, felt, tasted; also criticized, admired, talked and talked about.

— Maurice Hindus, Crisis in the Kremlin

Hindus describes the wonder and excitement with which Russians receive Hindus's gifts, everyday items from America— tea, coffee, Spam, cigarettes, and an electric razor. "'So practical and beautiful,' a woman exclaimed as she fondled a pack [of cigarettes] and then passed it to the schoolmaster's wife. 'It's so beautiful,' added the elderly woman. 'I hate to tear it open.' The cans that contained Spam would not be thrown away after their contents were consumed, but, rather, they were often re-used in the kitchen or as flower pots. It was partly the good itself but more so its packaging that engendered wonder and admiration, its clear mark of foreignness as an object from an "imaginary elsewhere". As Yurchak notes, the desire to possess Western goods, and to keep and display empty packaging and bottles even after they were freed of content, reflected the fact that the link to "elsewhere" (represented by the materiality of these objects) mattered more than their tangible utility as "consumable commodities (the actual liquor, beer, or cigarettes)". Their unmistakable Western origin was what "endowed them with great power".

== Responses to zagranitsa ==
With the end of the war and the start of the Cold War, officials sought to curb the desire and fascination for the West, which, according to Soviet Minister of Culture Andrei Zhdanov, was a detriment to the national pride of the USSR. In 1946, Zhdanov asked in an address Leningrad: "Is it for us… to bow low before everything foreign?" Zhdanov's campaigns against "rootless Cosmopolitanism" in the early years after the war persecuted progressive composers like Shostakovich and Prokofiev who were deemed too sympathetic to the bourgeois ideologies of the West.

At the same time the government encouraged citizens to learn to appreciate other forms of foreign culture. For example, learning foreign languages was encouraged as a part of the duties of an educated Soviet citizen, especially with the advent of shortwave radio. Cultural openness and internationalism had long been promoted, which had been contrasted, in propaganda, against the supposed racism and intolerance of the United States. The shortwave radio was promoted as a cultural tool to shape an internationalist perspective on the world. Although certain radio bands receiving from distant stations— such as the CIA-funded Radio Liberty— were always "jammed" or censored, the permitted bands still could receive from stations such as the BBC World Service, the Voice of America in English, and Radio France International in French. Thus, although partially censored, shortwave radios, which were promoted by the government, provided "windows to the west" through which Soviet citizens were still able to listen to jazz and rock-and-roll, which were, on the other hand, deemed as "bad" Cosmopolitanism by officials.

The distinction between "good" Internationalism and "bad" Cosmopolitanism and the line between acceptable and unacceptable practice were often ambiguous and determined on a case-by-case basis, so in general the verdicts on foreign cultural forms and influences were open to interpretation. This ambiguity allowed interest in zagranitsa to continue as an acceptable part of everyday life. According to Vassily Aksyonov, the "combination of vague pro-American feelings and an all-out anti-American propaganda campaign caused a certain segment of Soviet society to start leaning unconsciously in the direction of America in matters aesthetic, emotional, and even to some extent ideological. The 1960s saw a huge increase of interest in foreign languages and philosophies, American literature, and avant-garde jazz as well as a new-found fascination with traveling to exotic "elsewheres," with increased interest in the "practices of hiking, mountaineering, and going on geological expeditions in the remote nature reserves of Siberia, the Far East and the North".

== As a model ==
The official ambiguity toward zagranitsa was sustained by the fact that the West was often held up as a model for Soviet emulation. As Susan Reid notes, during the 1950s, even as the Socialist way of life was proclaimed as the "right" path toward prosperity, "the Soviet Union also entered into competition on terms set by the US… The regime couched its promises of economic growth in terms of 'catching up with and surpassing America'. In his address at the American National Exhibition in Moscow in 1959, Nikita Khrushchev stated: "We can learn something. We look at the American exhibition as an exhibition of our own achievements in the near future". Reid noted, "[the exhibition] was an instructive museum of the future from which to glean new processes and technologies on which to build Soviet, socialist prosperity". Thus the achievements were held up as a kind of Utopian inspiration for the USSR; the perceived competition with the West was inextricably linked with the goals and aspirations of the Soviet Union itself, whose ultimate goal, Communism, thus became intertwined with Western modes of prosperity and consumerism. Zagranitsa and the West became embedded in the model of Socialist Utopia during the second half of the Soviet period.

It was essential, although perhaps not apparent at the time, that zagranitsa and the West inevitably functioned as a kind of negation of the Soviet experiment, as it offered an alternative vision of prosperity that was possible without violent world revolution and socialism—and thus was the antithesis to a Soviet Union founded on Marxism. The persistent and prominent images of American capitalist prosperity proved to be an important part of Socialism's undoing.

== Influence in music ==
During the war years, American jazz became associated with the opening of the second front in 1944 and anticipated victory over the Nazis. Army bands learned jazz on the front and performed them at dance halls in Prague, Kraków, and Leningrad after the war. However, American jazz, deemed "Cosmopolitan," soon came under attack by the government, despite its roots in black culture. This, according to Yurchak, was representative of the ambiguity and changing standards of what was acceptable and unacceptable, as the integrity of jazz was not assessed by its social class, the usual metric.

jazz was secret weapon number one." Its influence, especially on Soviet youth, was substantial in fostering pro-Western feeling: "Every night the Voice of America would beam a two-hour jazz program at the Soviet Union from Tangiers. The snatches of music and bits of information made for a kind of golden glow over the horizon when the sun went down, that is, in the West, the inaccessible but oh so desirable West. How many dreamy Russian boys came to puberty to the strains of Ellington's "Take the A Train"…We taped the music on antediluvian recorders and played it over and over at semiunderground parties, which often ended in fistfights with Komsomol patrols or even police raids."

— Vassily Aksyonov, In Search of Melancholy Baby

Although it was publicly criticized, denounced, and listening was made an illicit activity, jazz continued to exist officially in concerts held by state organizations, for example, by Komsomol committees, as long as it was "adapted to fit the Soviet context". The success with which jazz had actually been adapted is questionable, however. Even when imbued with Soviet melodies or with alternative lyrics, jazz (and rock-and-roll) elicited "overly excited" reactions from young people, engendered by their associations with zagranitsa. These forms could not be completely dissociated from its associations with the West, but they did acquire their own meanings and significance for the Soviet generation that grew up listening to them.

== Influence in fashion ==
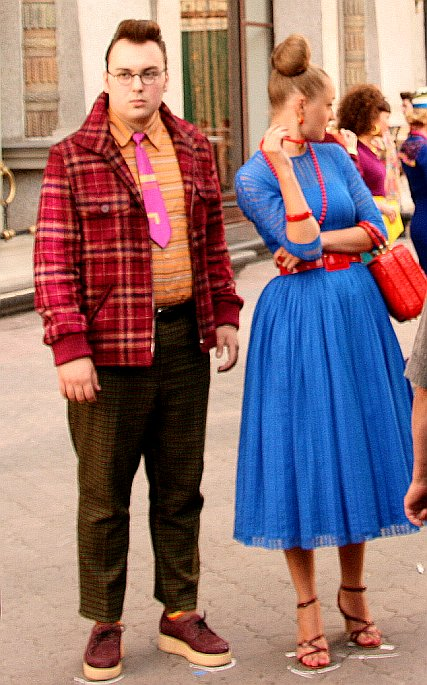
A scene from the Russian nostalgic jukebox musical Stilyagi

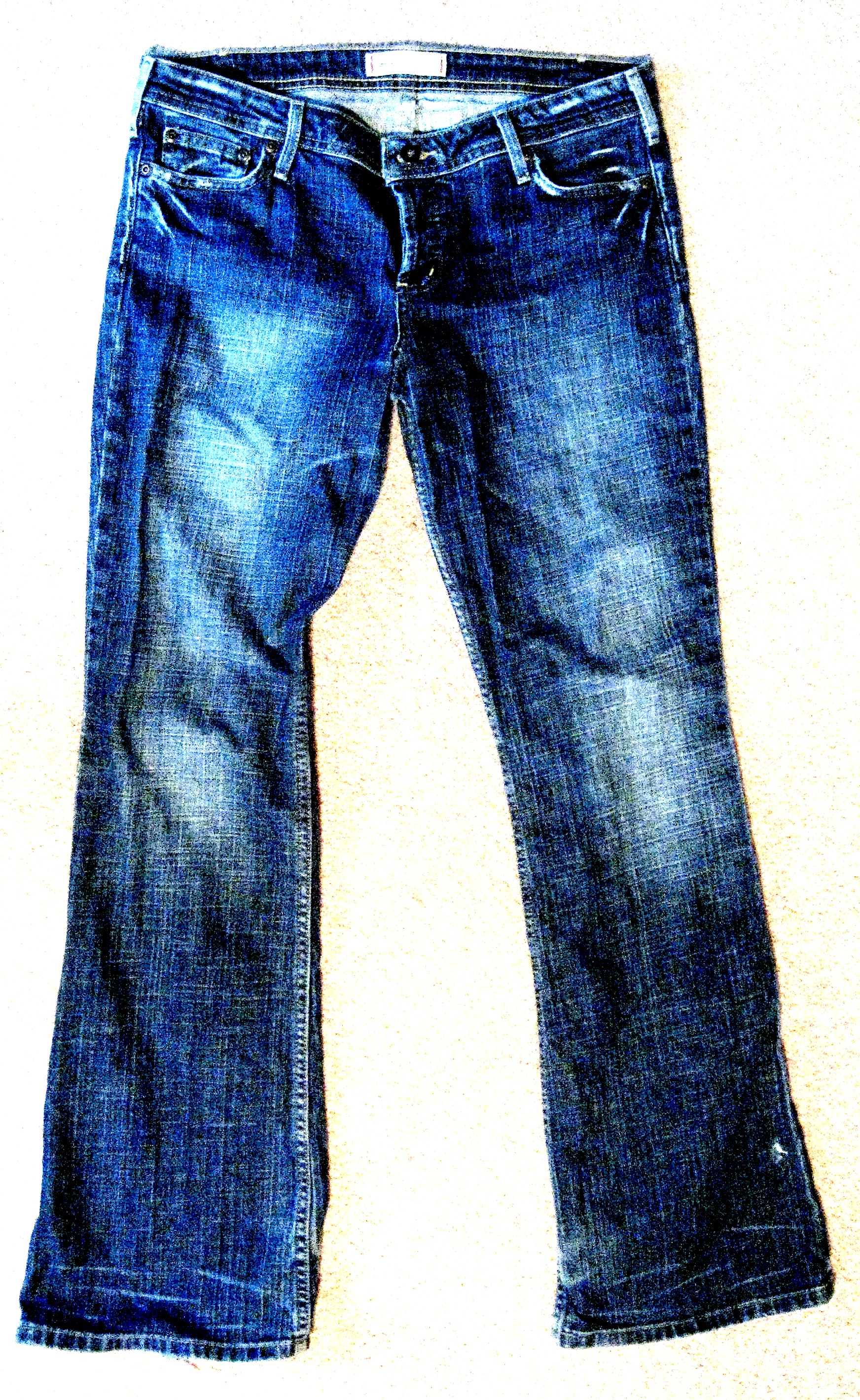
Denim jeans, an item of desire and envy in the Soviet Union

The desire for zagranitsa also manifested itself in the style subculture of the stilyagi (plural of stilyaga, meaning "stylish" or "style-hunter") that emerged from the 1940s. Stilyagi were Soviet youths who adopted an aesthetic style inspired by American films shown in Soviet theatres. Their clothes were marked by loud patterns and colors and tight fits.

Often, because the clothes could not be found in Soviet stores, stilyagi made their own clothes. Some American clothes from Lend-Lease could be found in Soviet secondhand shops. Still others bought their clothing from fartsovshchiks, people who dealt in the illegal business of acquiring and selling foreign goods and currency. Stilyagi listened to jazz and rock-and-roll, and frequented clubs like Hotel Evropeiskaia in Leningrad, which featured the Yosif Vainshtein orchestra and played American swing melodies.

However, as Yurchak writes, the stilyagi were a small subculture, and the majority of Soviet Youth looked on stilyagi with disdain. The perception of stilyagi was that they were shallow and "uneducated slackers" who knew "fashions from all over the world" but not Griboyedov.

Komsomol members and even the police suppressed gatherings of stilyagi. However, the government's attack on these more extreme manifestations of Western influence left alone those who less conspicuously enjoyed zagranitsa. Even during the Stalin years, the Soviet citizen had been encouraged to enjoy consumption of personal, 'bourgeois', pleasures such as dresses, wristwatches and lipstick as long as they were not used to elevate egoism or status, but as a reward for hard work. Thus, only the splashiest aesthetic pursuits of zagranitsa were hindered, while the many Soviet citizens who continued to engage with Western culture in fashion, music, films, and literature in less ostentatious ways escaped criticism.

Beyond the stilyagi phenomenon, due to the neglect of popular demand by the Soviet-style planned economy, the country badly lacked fashionable and simply nice and convenient clothing. This resulted in a fascination with ordinary western clothing commonly provided smugglers, the most notable example being denim jeans and shirts.

== Disillusionment ==
The zagranitsa of the late Soviet period was an imaginary place, constructed from pieces of Western culture from films, jazz and rock-and-roll vinyls, and the glossy pages of magazines, the imaginings of a distant "abroad". Aksyonov describes the perception he had had of America as "impossibly idealized and distorted". Partly because zagranitsa was "forbidden fruit", it had been desired and idealized.

However, when Soviets came into real contact with the West, the result was often surprise and disappointment. In the 1959 American National Exhibition in Moscow, which famously displayed a 'slice' of the American way of life in its kitchen exhibition, some Soviet spectators reacted with ambivalence and disappointment:

We expected that the American exhibition would show something grandiose, some earthly equivalent to Soviet sputniks. But you Americans want to amaze us with the glitter of your kitchen pans and the fashions which do not appeal to us at all. And this is one of the greatest nations?? I feel sorry for the Americans, judging by your exhibition. Does your life really consist only of kitchens?

— Susan Reid,"'Our Kitchen Is Just As Good: Soviet Responses to the American National Exhibition in Moscow, 1959"

With Perestroika, the United States and the West became more accessible to Soviet citizens and suddenly "it became obvious that the Imaginary West was something very different from the real West". This realization forced a reevaluation of the late Soviet period and of Soviet identity in general. The theme of disillusionment with the imaginary abroad is presented in several post-Soviet films, including Stilyagi (2008) (Hipsters in English) directed by Valery Todorovsky and You Are My Only One (1993), directed by Dmitry Astrakhan. Lawton notes that the theme of realization of zagranitsa as imaginary in these films usually strikes a patriotic note as protagonists learn to choose their real, if imperfect homelands over imagined foreign utopias.

== Sources ==
- Aksyonov, Vassily (1989). In Search of Melancholy Baby. Knopf Doubleday Publishing Group. ISBN 978-0-394-75992-0.
- Boym, Svetlana (30 June 2009). Common Places: Mythologies of Everyday Life in Russia. Harvard University Press. ISBN 978-0-674-02864-7.
- Hindus, Maurice Gerschon (1953). Crisis in the Kremlin. Doubleday.
- Lawton, Anna M. (2004). Imaging Russia 2000: Film and Facts. New Academia Publishing, LLC. ISBN 978-0-9744934-3-5.
- Reid, Susan E. (1 January 2008). "Our Kitchen is Just as Good': Soviet Responses to the American National Exhibition in Moscow, 1950". In Crowley, David; Pavitt, Jane (eds.). Cold War Modern: Design 1945-1970. V&A Publishing. pp. 154–161. ISBN 978-1-85177-570-5.
- Yurchak, Alexei (7 August 2013). Everything Was Forever, Until It Was No More: The Last Soviet Generation. Princeton University Press. ISBN 978-1-4008-4910-9.
