= Culture of the Soviet Union =

The culture of the Soviet Union passed through several stages during the country's 69-year existence. It was diverse and complex, being contributed to by people of various nationalities from and within each of the fifteen SSRs, although the majority of the influence was Russian — the respective republic hosting the union's capital, alongside being the largest, most populated, and most developed constituent republic. The Soviet state supported the establishment and flourishing of many cultural institutions, but also carried out significant censorship.

== History ==
=== Lenin era ===
The main feature of communist attitudes towards the arts and artists in the years 1918–1929 was relative freedom, with significant experimentation in several different styles in an effort to find a distinctive Soviet style of art. In many respects, the NEP period was a time of relative freedom and experimentation for the social and cultural life of the Soviet Union. The government tolerated a variety of trends in these fields, provided they were not overtly hostile towards the establishment. In art and literature, numerous schools, some traditional and others radically experimental, proliferated. Communist writers Maxim Gorky and Vladimir Mayakovsky were active during this time, but other authors, many of whose works were later repressed, published work lacking socialist political content. Film, as a means of influencing a largely illiterate society, received encouragement from the state; much of cinematographer Sergei Eisenstein's best work dates from this period.

Education, under Commissar Anatoly Lunacharsky, entered a phase of experimentation based on progressive theories of learning. At the same time, the state expanded the primary and secondary school system, and introduced night schools for working adults. The quality of higher education was affected by admissions policy that preferred entrants from the proletarian class over those from bourgeois backgrounds, regardless of the applicants' qualifications.

Under NEP, the state eased its active persecution of religion begun during war communism but continued to agitate on behalf of atheism. The party supported the Living Church reform movement within the Russian Orthodox Church in hopes that it would undermine faith in the church, but the movement died out in the late-1920s.

In family life, attitudes generally became more permissive. The state legalized abortion, and it made divorce progressively easier to obtain, whilst public cafeterias proliferated at the expense of private family kitchens.

=== Stalin era ===
Arts during the rule of Joseph Stalin were characterized by the rise and domination of the government-imposed style of socialist realism, with all other trends being severely repressed, with rare exceptions. Many notable works of Mikhail Bulgakov were not repressed, although the full text of his novel The Master and Margarita was published only in 1966. Many writers were imprisoned and killed, or died of starvation, examples being Daniil Kharms, Osip Mandelstam, Isaac Babel and Boris Pilnyak. Andrei Platonov worked as a caretaker and was not allowed to publish. The work of Anna Akhmatova was also condemned by the government, although she notably refused the opportunity to escape to the West. During the time when the Party was trying to make Soviet government more palatable to Ukrainians, a great deal of national self-determination and cultural development was tolerated. After this short period of the renaissance of Ukrainian literature ended, more than 250 Ukrainian writers died during the Great Purge, for example Valerian Pidmohylny (1901–1937), in the so-called Executed Renaissance. Texts of imprisoned authors were confiscated by the NKVD and some of them were published later. Books were removed from libraries and destroyed.

In addition to literature, musical expression was also repressed during the Stalin era, and at times the music of many Soviet composers was banned altogether. Dmitri Shostakovich experienced a particularly long and complex relationship with Stalin, during which his music was denounced and prohibited twice, in 1936 and 1948 (see Zhdanov Doctrine). Sergei Prokofiev and Aram Khachaturian had similar cases. Although Igor Stravinsky did not live in the Soviet Union, his music was officially considered formalist and anti-Soviet.

=== Late Soviet Union ===
In the late Soviet Union, Soviet popular culture was characterized by fascination with the Western popular culture as exemplified by the blue jeans craze.

In arts, the liberalization of all aspects of life starting from the Khrushchev Thaw created a possibility for the evolution of various forms of non-formal, underground and dissident art; still repressed, but no longer under the immediate threat of imprisonment. Aleksandr Solzhenitsyn, who wrote the critical One Day in the Life of Ivan Denisovich, was awarded the Nobel Prize in Literature and subsequently exiled from the Soviet Union.

Greater experimentation in art forms became permissible in the 1970s, with the result that more sophisticated and subtly critical work began to be produced. The government loosened the strictures of socialist realism; thus, for instance, many protagonists of the novels of author Yury Trifonov concerned themselves with problems of daily life rather than with building socialism. In music, although the state continued to frown on such Western phenomena as jazz and rock, it began to permit Western musical ensembles specializing in these genres to make limited appearances. But the native balladeer Vladimir Vysotsky, widely popular in the Soviet Union, was denied official recognition because of his iconoclastic lyrics.

Culture continued to change following the attempted 1991 coup and the eventual dissolution of the Soviet Union. Democratic elections helped foster free speech. A wider array of political opinions were tolerated by the government, and these opinions were shared through public media, leaflets and pamphlets, and discussion with others.

== See also ==
- Bibliography of the Russian Revolution and Civil War § Social history
- Bibliography of Stalinism and the Soviet Union § Social history
- Bibliography of the Post Stalinist Soviet Union § Social history
- Cinema of the Soviet Union
- Culture of Belarus
- Culture of Russia
- Culture of Ukraine
- Family in the Soviet Union
- Fashion in the Soviet Union
- List of Russian-language novelists
- List of Russian-language playwrights
- List of Russian-language poets
- Music of the Soviet Union
- Religion in the Soviet Union
- Soviet cuisine
- Soviet people
