= Tombakowa młodzież =

Polish youth sub-culture

- Years active: 1939-1945
- Country: General Government
- Influences: Hipster
- Influenced: Bikini boys

The tombakowa młodzież (transl. tombac youth) were members of a youth subculture in Warsaw during World War II.

== History ==
During the Second Polish Republic, jazz became an increasingly popular genre of music among young urbanites. Following the Nazi occupation the jazz phenomenon intensified with groups of youths in Warsaw becoming noticeable for their love of jazz, pleasure seeking attitude, and style of dress. Members of the subculture were reputed to use sophisticated German in the presence of Nazis in an acerbic display of flattery.

While the German propaganda newspaper Nowy Kurier Warszawski condemned the tombakowa młodzież for their style of dress, participants of the subculture were also derided as traitors to Poland due to their seemingly carefree behaviour under the occupation.

The tombakowa młodzież have been considered the progenitors of the later post-war bikini boys subculture.

== Style ==
Comparable in fashion to their French contemporaries, the zazous, the tombakowa młodzież were known for wearing knee length jackets and slim trousers.

== See also ==
- 1940s in Western fashion
- Bikini boys
- Potápky
- Swingjugend
- Zazou
