= Swingjugend =

Counterculture in Nazi Germany

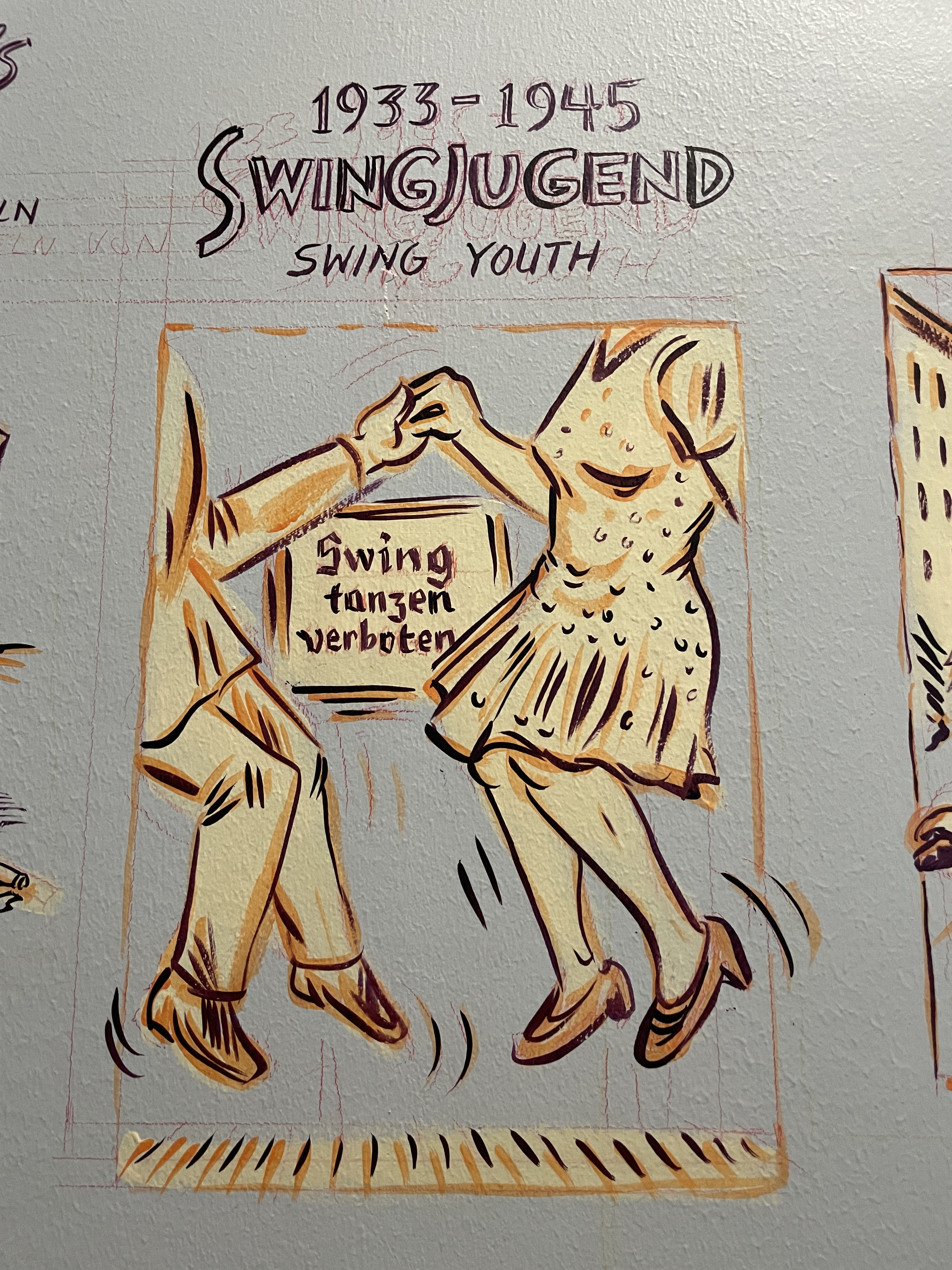
- An artistic depiction of the subculture from an exhibition at the Humboldt Forum
- Years active: 1939–1941
- Country: Nazi Germany
- Influences: Johannes Heesters

The Swing Youth (German: Swingjugend) were a youth counterculture of jazz and swing lovers in Germany formed in Hamburg in 1939. Primarily active in Hamburg and Berlin, they were composed of 14- to 21-year-old Germans, mostly middle or upper-class students, but also including some in the working class. They admired the "American way of life", defining themselves in swing music and opposing Nazism, especially the Hitler Youth (German: Hitlerjugend).

They loosely structured themselves into “clubs” with names such as the Harlem Club, the OK Gang, and the Hot Club. This underground subculture, distinctly nonconformist with a focus on African-American music, was active in the German youth scene. Despite being largely apolitical and unstructured, the Swing Youth were targeted and, in some cases, repressed by the Nazi government.

== Name ==
The name Swingjugend was a parody of the numerous youth groups that were organised by the Nazis, such as the Hitlerjugend. The youth also referred to themselves as Swings or Swingheinis ("Swingity"); members were called "Swing-Boy", "Swing-Girl" or "Old-Hot-Boy".

== Counter-culture ==
During the Nazi regime, all those aged 9 to 17 in Germany who were considered to be Aryan were encouraged to join the Hitler Youth and the League of German Girls. The leaders of these organisations realised they had to offer some attraction in the area of social dancing to recruit members. Instead of adopting the popular swing dance, because it was viewed as degenerate and tied to the "damnable jazz", they resorted to the new German community dances. This proved to be unsuccessful, and instead of embracing the Hitler Youth pastimes, city girls and boys crowded the swing dance joints.

This seemed to be the case particularly in the city of Hamburg, where the swing scene was huge. These teenage hoppers were known as Swing-Heinis, a name the authorities called them. The Swing Youth disparagingly, in the context of a predominantly homophobic culture, called the Hitler Youth the "Homo Youth". The League of German Maidens was called the "League of Soldiers' Mattresses", implying the group existed to have sex with German soldiers. This was seen as derogatory in a society praising chaste behaviour before marriage for girls, as the League of German Maidens promoted. The Swing Youth used their love of swing and jazz music to create their sub-culture, with one former Swing Kid Frederich Ritzel saying in a 1985 interview: "Everything for us was a world of great longing, Western life, democracy – everything was connected – and connected through jazz".

The Swing Kids danced in private quarters, clubs, and rented halls. These adolescents dressed differently from the others who were opposed to swing. For example, boys added a little British flair to their clothes by wearing homburg hats, growing their hair long, and attaching a Union Jack pin to their jacket. As a reflection of their Anglophilia, the "Swing boys" liked to carry around umbrellas whatever the weather and to smoke pipes.

Girls wore short skirts, applied lipstick and fingernail polish, and wore their hair long and down instead of applying braids or German-style rolls. The fondness of the "Swing girls" to wear their hair curled and to apply much make-up was a rejection of the Nazi regime's fashion tastes as in the Third Reich, the "natural look" with no make-up and braided hair was the preferred style for women as it was felt to be more "Germanic". A police report from 1940 described the Swing Youth as follows:

The predominant form of dress consisted of long, often checked English sports jackets, shoes with thick light crepe soles, showy scarves, Anthony Eden hats, an umbrella on the arm whatever the weather, and, as an insignia, a dress-shirt button worn in the buttonhole, with a jewelled stone.

The girls liked a long overflowing hair style. Their eyebrows were penciled, they wore lipstick and their nails were lacquered.

The bearing and behaviour of the members of the clique resembled their dress.

One of their German idols was Johannes Heesters, an actor specialised in operas. The Swingmen admired his pale face and combed long black hair and tried to copy his attire.

This group consisted mostly of teens and young adults from the upper-class homes of Hamburg. Their objectives were originally more self-indulgent in nature, being privileged with wealth and German heritage, they spent their money on expensive clothing and liquor. The British musicologist Ralph Willett wrote that the Swing Youth wanted to emulate "the cool, languid demeanour" of British and American film stars.

When the restrictions on jazz became law, their pastime became a political statement, setting them in clear opposition to the Nazi Party. German musicologist Guido Fackler described the Swingjugend embrace of American music and the "English style" in clothing as reflecting the fact that:

The Swingjugend rejected the Nazi country, above all because of its ideology and uniformity, its militarism, the 'Führer principle' and the leveling Volksgemeinschaft (people's community). They experienced a massive restriction of their personal freedom. They rebelled against all this with jazz and swing, which stood for a love of life, self-determination, non-conformism, freedom, independence, liberalism, and internationalism.

Reflecting their Anglophilia, the Swing Youth preferred to speak to each other in English rather than German, as English was felt to be more "cool", a choice of language that vexed the authorities greatly. English and French were languages widely taught in Gymnasium (high schools intended as preparation for university) since the early 20th century in the case of English and since the 18th century in the case of French, so any German teenager who attended a Gymnasium could speak at least some French and English.

As the Swing Youth were Anglophiles, they often tried to speak and write in the "English style". One "swing boy", in a 1940 letter written in slightly broken English to a friend who was going to Hamburg, stated: "Be a proper spokesmen for Kiel, won't you? i.e, make sure you're really casual, singing or whistling English hits all the time, absolutely smashed and always surrounded by really amazing women".

Hamburg, the most Anglophile of German cities, was regarded as the "capital" of the Swing Youth, and British jazz players like Jack Hylton and Nat Gonella were popular with the Swing Youth. Willet wrote that they "... were sufficiently sophisticated to appreciate the superiority of the American artists as well as the stylish and sensuous qualities of their performances." The Swing Youth were also Americanophiles. Many took monikers like Alaska Bill or Texas Jack and their clubs had such names like Harlem Club, OK Gang Club, and Cotton Club.

For those designated non-Aryan, it became even more dangerous to be associated with the swing crowd by November 1938, during and after Kristallnacht. The "Swing Youth" tended to welcome Jewish and Mischlinge ("half-breed") teenagers who wanted to join their gatherings. Affiliation with the jazz culture was damaging whenever other incriminating information could be factored into a formula for persecution. For example, many half-Jews were sought out and persecuted before others if they were known as Swing Kids.

For the first five years of the Third Reich, Nazi propaganda had been favourable to Britain, as Hitler had hoped for an Anglo-German alliance. In 1938, when it became clear that Britain was not going to ally with Germany, the propaganda of the regime turned fiercely Anglophobic. A major Britain-bashing campaign was launched in the autumn of 1938. In this light, the Anglophilia of the Swing Youth could be seen as an implicit rejection of the regime.

Swing music was offensive to Nazi ideology, because it was often performed by black people and a number of Jewish musicians. They called it "Negro Music" (German: Negermusik), "degenerate music"—coined in parallel to "degenerate art" (German: entartete Kunst). Song texts defied Nazi ideology, going as far as to promote sexual permissiveness or free love. Despite this, not all jazz was forbidden in Germany at the time. German art policy was very similar to the Soviet Union at this time, with espousal of Heroic Realism, which was very similar to Socialist realism in that it saw art as an instrument of the party.

The Swing Kids were initially basically apolitical, similar to their zoot suiter counterparts in North America. A closer parallel to the Swing Youth were the Zazou movement in France at the same time, for the Zazous also enjoyed American music, liked to dress in the "English style", and had a preference for speaking English over French as the former was felt to be more "cool". In Austria, the term Schlurf was used for a similar group. A popular term that the swing subculture used to define itself was Lottern, roughly translated as something between "laziness" and "sleaziness", indicating contempt for the pressure to do "useful work" and the repressive sexual mores of the time.

Reports by Hitler Youth observers of swing parties and jitterbug went into careful detail about the overtly sexual nature of both. One report describes as "moral depravity" the fact that swing youth took pleasure in their sexuality. The German historian Detlev Peukert noted how much the police reports on the Swing Youth obsessively concentrated on the subject of the Swing Youth's "unabashed pleasure in sexuality", though he cautioned that some of the more sensationalist claims about the sexual lives of the Swing Youth in these reports probably said more about the mindset of the people who wrote them, than what the Swing Youth were actually doing. In particular, Peukert wrote that the lurid claims made by the police that Swing Youth dance sessions were followed up by group sex seems to have had no basis in reality.

The Swing Kids were defining a counterculture, shown by their clothing and music. Their behaviour, described by many Nazis as "effete", ran counter to the spartan militarism that the regime was trying to inculcate in its youth. They organised dance festivals and contests and invited jazz bands. These events were occasions to mock the Nazis, the military and the Hitlerjugend—hence the famous "Swing Heil!", mocking the infamous "Sieg Heil!". Swing Kids wore long hair and hats, carried umbrellas and met in cafés and clubs. They developed a jargon mostly made of anglicisms.

The Swing Youth were intense Anglophiles who preferred to listen to "English music" (i.e. American swing and jazz music) and liked to dress in the "English style". A secret report from the Reich Ministry of Justice in January 1944 described the Swing Youth as follows:

The most striking example among these groups is the so-called Swing Youth, on whom there have been reports from various parts of the Reich. They began in Hamburg. These groups are motivated by the desire to have a good time and have increasingly assumed a character bordering on the criminal-antisocial. Even before the war boys and girls from Hamburg from the socially privileged classes joined groups, wearing strikingly casual clothing and became fans of English music [i.e. American music] and dance. At the turn of the year 1939/1940 the Flottbeck group organized dances which were attended by 5–6000 young people and which were marked by an uninhibited indulgence in swing. After the ban on public dances they organized dances at home, which were marked above all by sexual promiscuity... The hunger for English dance music and for their own dance bands led to break-ins in shops selling musical instruments. The greed to participate in what appeared to them to be a stylish life in clubs, bars, cafes and house balls suppressed any positive attitude towards responding to the needs of the time. They were unimpressed by the performance of our Wehrmacht; those killed in action were sometimes held to ridicule. An attitude of hostility to the war is clearly apparent.

The members dress in clothes which imitate English fashions. Thus, they often wear pleated jackets in tartan designs and carry umbrellas. As a badge they wear a colored dress-shirt button in their lapels. They regard Englishmen as the highest form of human development. A false conception of freedom leads them into opposition to the Hitler Youth.

== Ways of resistance ==
Though they were not an organised political-opposition organisation, the whole culture of the Swing Kids evolved into a non-violent refusal of the civil order and culture of National Socialism.

From a paper of the National Youth Leader:

The members of the Swing youth oppose today's Germany and its police, the Party and its policy, the Hitlerjugend, work and military service, and are opposed, or at least indifferent, to the ongoing war. They see the mechanisms of National Socialism as a "mass obligation". The greatest adventure of all times leaves them indifferent; much to the contrary, they long for everything that is not German, but English.

From 1941, the violent repression by the Gestapo and the Hitlerjugend shaped the political spirit of the swing youth. Also, by police order, people under 18 were forbidden to go to dance bars, which encouraged the movement to seek its survival in clandestine measures.

The strict regimentation of youth culture in Nazi Germany through the Hitler Youth led to the emergence of several underground protest movements, through which adolescents were better able to exert their independence. There were street gangs (Meuten) of working class youths who borrowed elements from socialist and communist traditions to forge their own identities. There were less politically motivated groups, such as the Edelweiss Pirates (German: Edelweißpiraten), who acted in defiance of Hitler Youth norms. A third group, consisting mainly of upper middle class youths, based their protest on their musical preferences, rejecting the völkisch music propagated by the party for American jazz forms, especially swing.

=== Connection with the White Rose ===
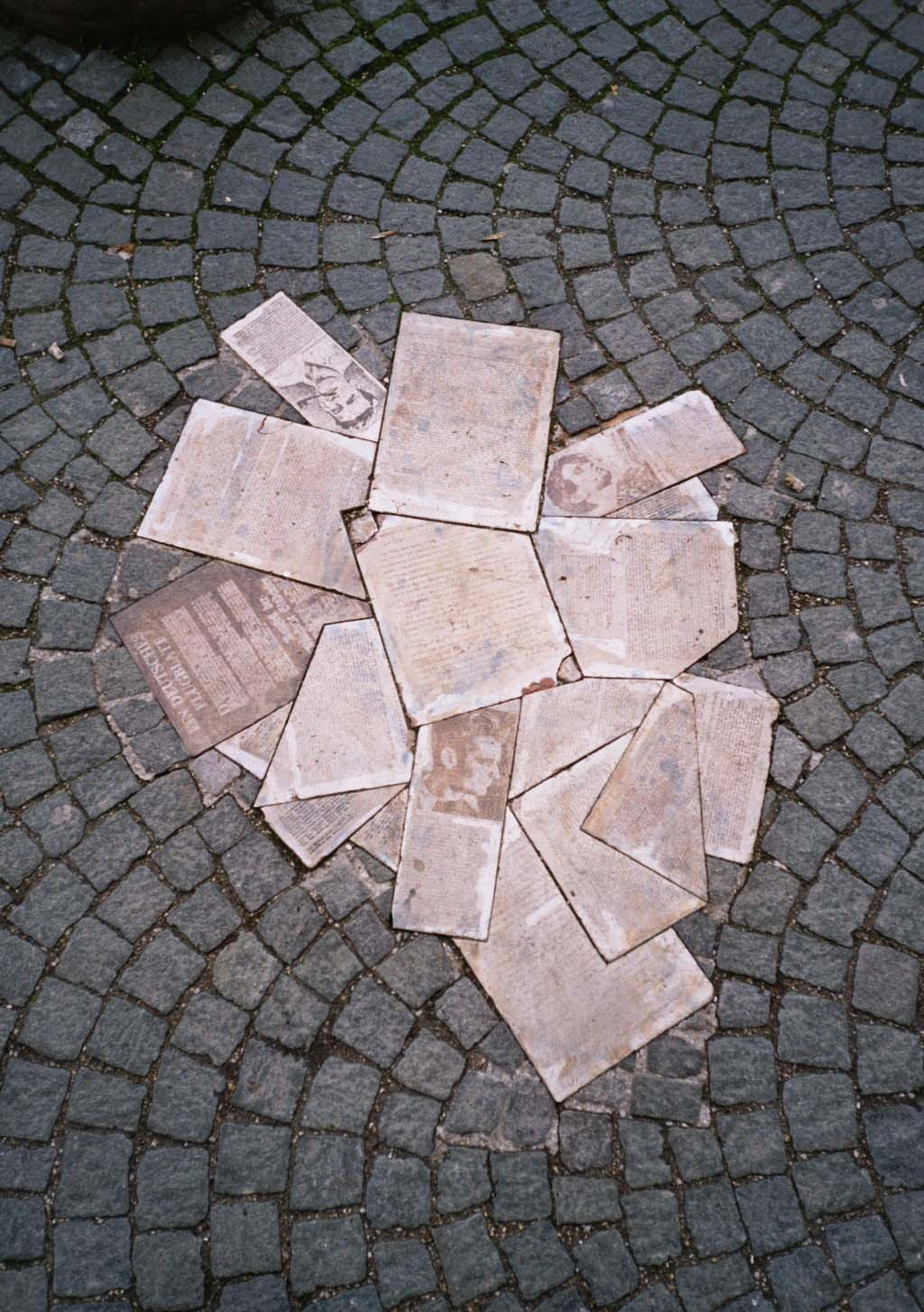
A monument to the "Weiße Rose" in front of LMU Munich

The Swing Kids of Hamburg at some point had contacts with another resistance movement, when three members of the White Rose (German: Weiße Rose) developed a sympathy for the Swing Kids. No formal co-operation arose, though these contacts were later used by the Volksgerichtshof ("People's Court") to accuse some Swing Kids of anarchist propaganda and sabotage of the armed forces. The consequent trial, death sentences and executions were averted by the ending of the war.

== Swing clubs ==
When bigger gatherings were banned, the Swing Kids moved to more informal settings, and swing clubs and discotheques emerged in all the major cities of the Reich. Participants were mainly from the upper middle class, as swing culture required the participants to have access to the music, which was not played on German radio, so that extensive collections of phonograph recordings were essential.

Similarly, to understand the lyrics of the predominantly American songs, it was necessary to have at least a rudimentary understanding of English, which was not taught in the Volksschule working-class high school. Relative wealth also fostered a distinctive style among the Swing Kids, which was in some ways comparable to the zoot suit style popular in the United States at the time.

Boys usually wore long jackets, often checkered, shoes with crepe soles for dancing, and flashy scarves. They almost always carried an umbrella, and added a dress shirt button with a semi-precious stone. Girls generally wore their hair long and loose and added excessive makeup. Their dandyish dress style riled the Nazis by drawing heavily on Hispanic pachucos.

== Arrests and operations ==
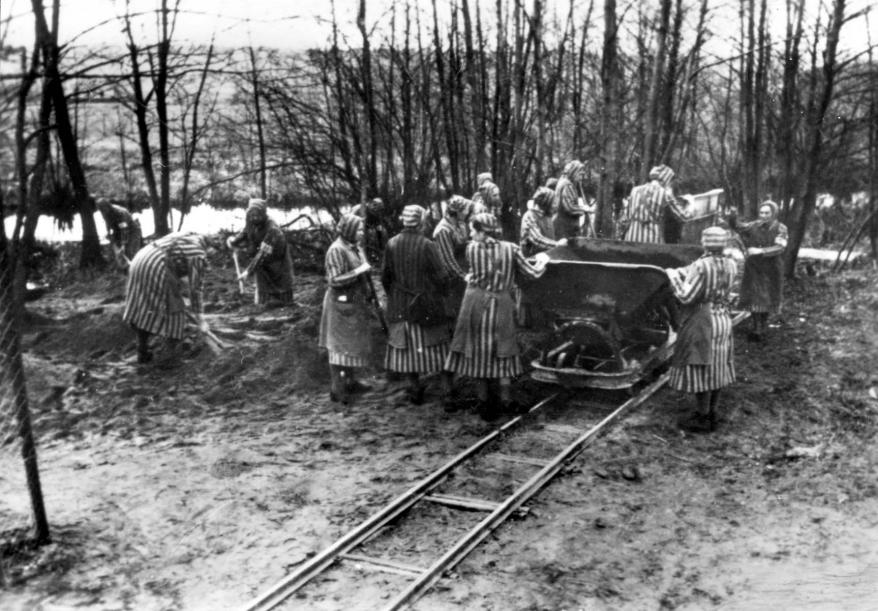
Prisoners at Ravensbrück concentration camp

On 18 August 1941, in a brutal police operation, over 300 Swingjugend were arrested. The measures against them ranged from cutting their hair and sending them back to school under close monitoring, to the deportation of the leaders to concentration camps. The boys went to the Moringen concentration camp while the girls were sent to Ravensbrück concentration camp.

== In modern culture ==
The 1993 film Swing Kids examined this underground culture of rebellion during Nazi Germany. Directed by Thomas Carter (Holly Harold, assistant Mr. Carter) and starring Robert Sean Leonard, Christian Bale, Frank Whaley, and Kenneth Branagh (uncredited), the picture was not a commercial success but sustains a large underground following and is described by film critic Janet Maslin as having a historical background.

German filmmaker Margit Czenki's made-for-television movie Swingpfennig/Deutschmark (1994) featured the original Swingboys Günter Discher and Otto Bender. Set in the St. Pauli of the early 1990s, the protagonists of the film – musicians around the band Die Goldenen Zitronen – uncover and stumble upon the history of the Swing Kids.

== Famous people with a Swingjugend past ==
- Ludwig W. Adamec, Austrian scholar on the Middle East and Afghanistan
- Ralph Giordano, Jewish-German writer
- Walter Kempowski, German writer
- Heinz Lord, German-American physician
- Emil Mangelsdorff, German jazz musician
- Giwi Margwelaschwili, German-Georgian writer and philosopher
- Hans Massaquoi, German-American journalist, grandson of Momulu Massaquoi

== See also ==
- Edelweiss Pirates
- Exi (subculture)
- Ghetto Swingers
- Reichsmusikkammer

International

- Potápky, a similar Czech subculture
- Tombakowa młodzież, a similar Polish subculture
- Zazou, a similar French subculture
- Stilyagi, a Soviet youth subculture
- Beatnik, US

General

- Counterculture
- History of subcultures in the 20th century
- Youth culture
