= Potápky =

Czech urban youth subculture

- Years active: 1940s
- Country: Protectorate of Bohemia and Moravia; Third Czechoslovak Republic; Czechoslovak Socialist Republic

Potápky (males, "The Grebes") and bedly (females, "The Parasol Mushrooms") were a Czech urban youth subculture primarily defined by the interest in American culture, primarily in swing music. It corresponded to the subcultures of Swingjugend (literally "Swing Youth", commonly translated as "Swing Kids") in Nazi Germany and zazou in France at the same time period.

Potápky were distinguished by their eccentric fashion ("zoot suit", deformed hat, colored socks), long hair, body postures, and slang.

As with many youth subcultures it was characterized by the rebellion against the older generation, and during the Nazi occupation (Protectorate of Bohemia and Moravia), by rebellion against the Nazis.

== See also ==
- Czech bluegrass
- Czech tramping
- Máničky, a similar Czech youth subculture in Communist times
- Stilyagi, a similar subculture in the Soviet Union of 1960s
- Tombakowa młodzież, a similar subculture under the General Government
