= Zły (novel) =

1955 novel by Leopold Tyrmand

- Author: Leopold Tyrmand
- Language: Polish
- Genre: Crime fiction, romance
- Publisher: Czytelnik
- Publication date: December 1955
- Publication place: Warsaw
- English publication date: 1958

Zły (Polish for "The Evil One"; The Man with the White Eyes) is a 1955 Polish novel by Leopold Tyrmand. Set in post-war Warsaw, it follows a mysterious vigilante who wages a campaign against the city's criminal underworld. The novel became an immediate bestseller, and is one of Tyrmand's best-known novels.
