= Bills (subculture) =

- Years active: 1950s
- Country: Belgian Congo
- Major figures: Franco Luambo
- Influences: Cowboy culture

The Bills were a youth subculture active in Léopoldville, Belgian Congo in the late 1950s, basing much of their image and outlook on the cowboys of American Western movies. Its name was taken from Buffalo Bill.

== Background ==
Bills were gangs of teenagers that dressed in cowboy outfits and went against the prevailing political views of the time. They wore cowboy hats that were brown and had cowboy boots. From 1957 to 1959, half a dozen movie theaters opened in the "African" neighborhoods in Léopoldville (the city was segregated into African and European areas). The majority of Léopoldville's population was under 20, and most of these youths were educated to only primary level, since the colonial government reserved most of the secondary school places for Europeans. Poor education resulted in large scale unemployment, and, with little else to do, the youths began to make the theaters their meeting points. They were particularly drawn to Western movies, and "Billism" began to incorporate many of the motifs into their lives. The portrayal of Buffalo Bill in the movies was especially appealing partly because of the similarity to hunter heroes of Congolese culture. The character of Buffalo Bill had already appeared in over 20 films by that time, but the most influential movie is thought to be Pony Express, where Charlton Heston played Bill.

== Way of life ==
The Bills dressed in cowboy outfits (kerchiefs, jeans and shirts) sold in Kinshasa. The names of the 'territories' for each gang echoed those of the Western United States (Texas, Santa Fe), and the gangs themselves were usually named after their territories (such as the "Texas Bills"), but occasionally strayed outside the Western United States pantheon (such as "Godzilla"). Some commentators have suggested they provided a street-level counterpart to the more refined and overtly political anti-colonial struggle that was then being fought by some of the évolués (the middle class educated elite).

== Hindoubill ==
The Bills developed their own argot called Hindoubill (or Hindubill). The origins of this name are obscure, but may relate to either the Hindi films occasionally shown in Kinshasa, or to the Bills conflating the Native American "Indians" of "Cowboys and Indians" with the Indians of India (à la Columbus' mistake).
