= Zazou =

Subculture in France during World War II

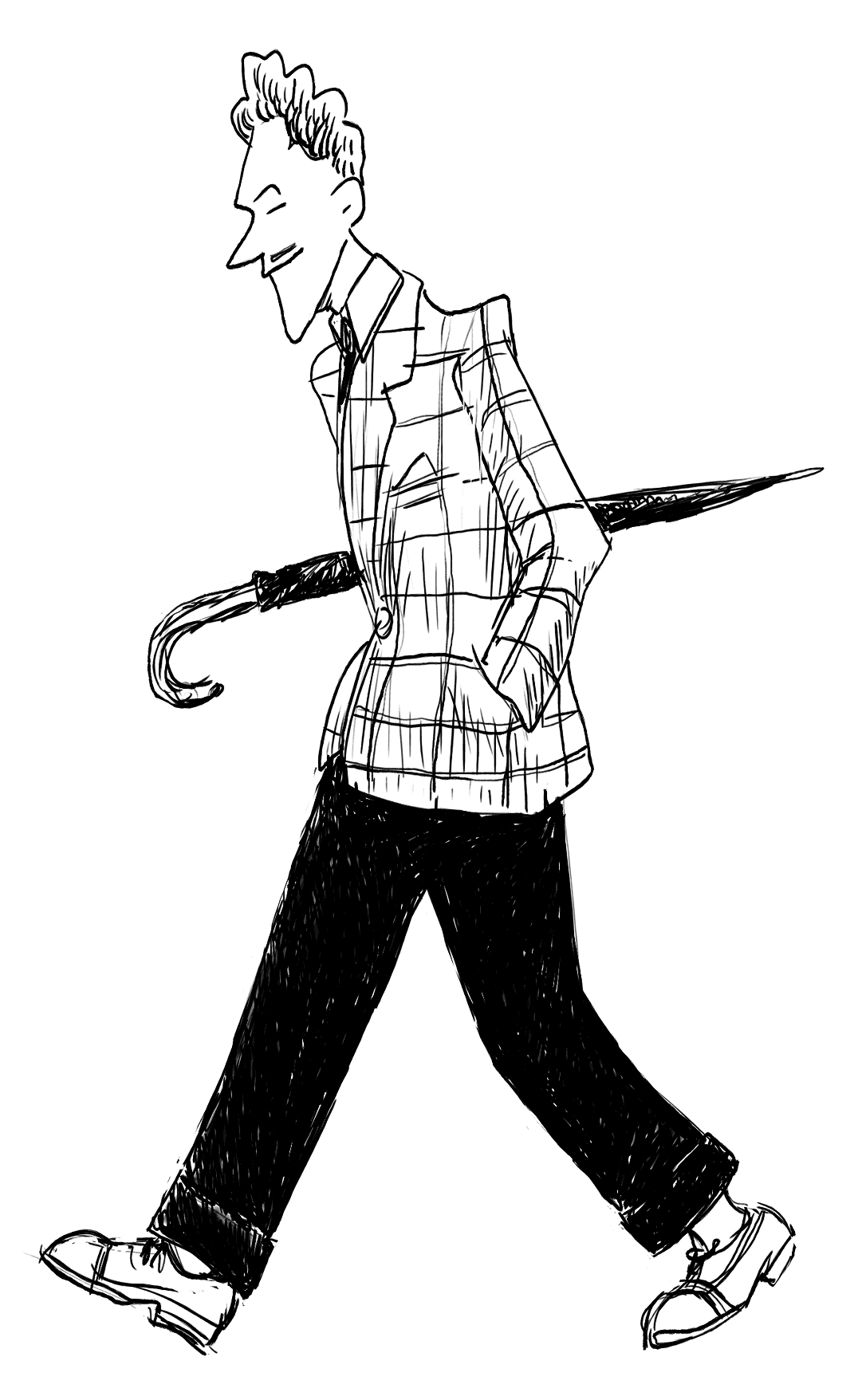
- A depiction of a male zazou
- Years active: 1940–1944
- Country: Vichy France
- Influences: Swing music

The zazous were a subculture in France during World War II. They were young people expressing their individuality by wearing big or garish clothing (similar to the zoot suit fashion in America a few years before) and dancing wildly to swing jazz. Men wore large striped lumber jackets, while women wore short skirts, striped stockings and heavy shoes, and often carried umbrellas.

== Origins of the movement ==
During the German occupation of France, the Vichy regime, which collaborated with the Nazi occupiers, had an ultra-conservative morality and started to use a whole range of laws against a youth that was restless and disenchanted. These young people expressed their resistance and nonconformity through aggressive dance competitions, sometimes against soldiers from the occupying forces.

The Zazous were to be found throughout France, but were most concentrated in Paris. The two most important meeting places of the Zazous were the terrace of the Pam Pam cafe on the Champs-Élysées and the Boul’Mich (the Boulevard Saint-Michel near the Sorbonne).

The Zazous of the Champs Elysées came from a more middle-class background and were older than the Zazous of the Latin Quarter. The Champs Elysées Zazous were easily recognisable on the terrace of the Pam Pam and took afternoon bike rides in the Bois de Boulogne. In the Latin Quarter, the Zazous met in the cellar clubs of Dupont-Latin or the Capoulade.

== Characteristics ==
The male Zazous wore extra large jackets, which hung down to their knees and which were fitted out with many pockets and often several half-belts. The amount of material used was a direct comment on government decrees on the rationing of clothing material. Their trousers were narrow, gathered at the waist, and so were their ties, which were cotton or heavy wool. The shirt collars were high and kept in place by a horizontal pin. They liked thick-soled suede shoes, with white or brightly coloured socks. Their hairstyles were greased and long. Many Zazous liked to dress in the style anglais with umbrellas (seen as a symbol of Britishness in France) a popular fashion accessory and their hair done up à la mode d'Oxford (as Simone de Beauvoir called it), had a fondness for speaking to each other in English as it was more "cool" and loved British and American popular music. The British historian of France W.D. Hall described the Zazou look as follows: "the young men wore dirty drape suits with "drainpipe" trousers under their sheepskin-lined jackets and brillianted liberally their long hair, the girls favored tight roll-collar sweaters with short flared skirts and wooden platform shoes, sported dark glasses with big lenses, put on heavy make-up and went bare-headed to show their dyed hair, set off by a lock of a different hue".

Female Zazous wore their hair in curls falling down to their shoulders, or in braids. Blonde was the favourite colour, and they wore bright red lipstick, as well as sunglasses, also favoured by some male Zazous. They wore jackets with extremely wide shoulders and short, pleated skirts. Their stockings were striped or sometimes net, and they wore shoes with thick wooden soles.

In his autobiography, Christian Dior wrote of the style:

Hats were far too large, skirts far too short, jackets far too long, shoes far too heavy... I have no doubt that this zazou style originated in a desire to defy the forces of occupation and the austerity of Vichy. For lack of other materials, feathers and veils, promoted to the dignity of flags, floated through Paris like revolutionary banners. But as a fashion I found it repellent.

The Zazous were fans of checkered patterns, on jacket, skirt or umbrellas. They began to appear in the vegetarian restaurants and developed a passion for grated carrot salad. They usually drank fruit juice or beer with grenadine syrup.

The Zazous were numbered in the hundreds rather than thousands and were generally between the ages of 17 and 20. Zazous came from different classes, races, and sexes but apparently shared similar outlooks. Working class Zazous used theft of cloth and black market activities to get their outfits, sometimes stitching their own clothes. Some of the more bohemian Zazous in the Latin Quarter varied the outfit, with sheepskin jackets and multicoloured scarves. It was their ironic and sarcastic comments on the Nazi/Vichy rulers, their dandyism and hedonism, their suspicion of the work ethic and their love of "decadent" jazz that distinguished them as one of the prototype youth movements questioning society.

While they did not suffer like their contemporaries in Germany, the Hamburg and Berlin based Swingjugend (many of whom were imprisoned in concentration camps) and the working class, mostly Cologne based Edelweiss Pirates (some of whom were hanged by the Nazis), the Zazou subculture represented an important dissident minority in a society of widespread complicity and acquiescence.

== "Syncopated" ==
One fascist magazine commented on the male Zazou: "Here is the specimen of Ultra Swing 1941: hair hanging down to the neck, teased up into an untidy quiff, little moustache à la Clark Gable... shoes with too-thick soles, syncopated walk."

The Zazous were directly inspired by jazz and swing music. A black jazz scene had sprung up in Montmartre in the inter-war years. Black Americans felt freer in Paris than they did back home, and the home-grown jazz scene was greatly reinforced by this immigration. Manouche Gypsy musicians like Django Reinhardt started playing swinging jazz music in the Paris clubs.

The Zazous probably got their name from a line in a song – "Zah Zuh Zah" by the jazz musician Cab Calloway, known for his recording of "Minnie the Moocher". Johnny Hess, a French crooner popular with the Zazous, released Je suis swing in early 1942, in which he sang the lines "Za zou, za zou, za zou, za zou ze", selling more units than any previously released record in France. An associate of the Zazous, the anarchist singer/songwriter, jazz trumpeter, poet and novelist Boris Vian was also extremely fond of z words in his work. The long drape jacket was also copied from zoot suits worn by the likes of Calloway.

"The Zazous were very obviously detested by the Nazis, who on the other side of the Rhine, had [for] a long time decimated the German cultural avant garde, forbidden jazz and all visible signs of...degenerations of Germanic culture…" (Pierre Seel, who, as a young Zazou, was deported to a German concentration camp because of his homosexuality.)

Depiction of a mock yellow star with the word Zazou replacing Juif

When the yellow star was forced on Jews, non-Jews who objected began to wear yellow stars with "Zazu", "Goy" (Gentile) or "Swing".

== Antagonism during the War ==
Vichy had started "Youth Worksites" in July 1940, in what Zazous perceived as an attempt to indoctrinate French youth. As in 1870–1871, France reacted to her shattering defeat by reforming existing institutions and creating new ones. The Vichy regime was very concerned about the education, moral fibre and productivity of French youth. In 1940, a Ministry of Youth was established. They saw the Zazous as a rival and dangerous influence on youth.

In 1940, 78 anti-Zazou articles were published in the press, a further nine in 1941 and 38 in 1943. The Vichy papers deplored the moral turpitude and decadence that was affecting French morality. Zazous were seen as work-shy, egotistical and Judeo-Gaullist shirkers.

By 1942, the Vichy regime realised that the national revival that they hoped would be carried out by young people under their guidance was seriously affected by widespread rejection of the patriotism, work ethic, self-denial, asceticism and masculinity this called for.

Soon, round-ups began in bars and Zazous were beaten on the street. They became Enemy Number One of the fascist youth organisation Jeunesse Populaire Française (JPF). "Scalp the Zazous!" became their slogan, with squads of young JPF fascists armed with hairclippers attacking Zazous. Many were arrested and sent to the countryside to work on the harvest.

At this point the Zazous went underground, holing up in their dance halls and basement clubs. The Zazous were suspected by the official Communist resistance of having an apathetic, even flippant attitude to the war in general.

== In popular culture ==
In 1986, the British duo Pet Shop Boys wrote a song about Zazou called "In the Night", which was the B-side for the first single release of "Opportunities (Let's Make Lots of Money)". A remix was used as the theme music for the BBC programme The Clothes Show.

== See also ==
- Exercises in Style
- Potápky, a similar Czech subculture of the same era
- Stilyagi, a similar subculture in the Soviet Union
- Swing (dance)
- Swing Kids, a similar subculture in Nazi Germany
- Tombakowa młodzież, a similar subculture under the General Government
