= Stilyagi =

1940s-1960s Soviet youth counterculture movement

Stilyagi стиляги
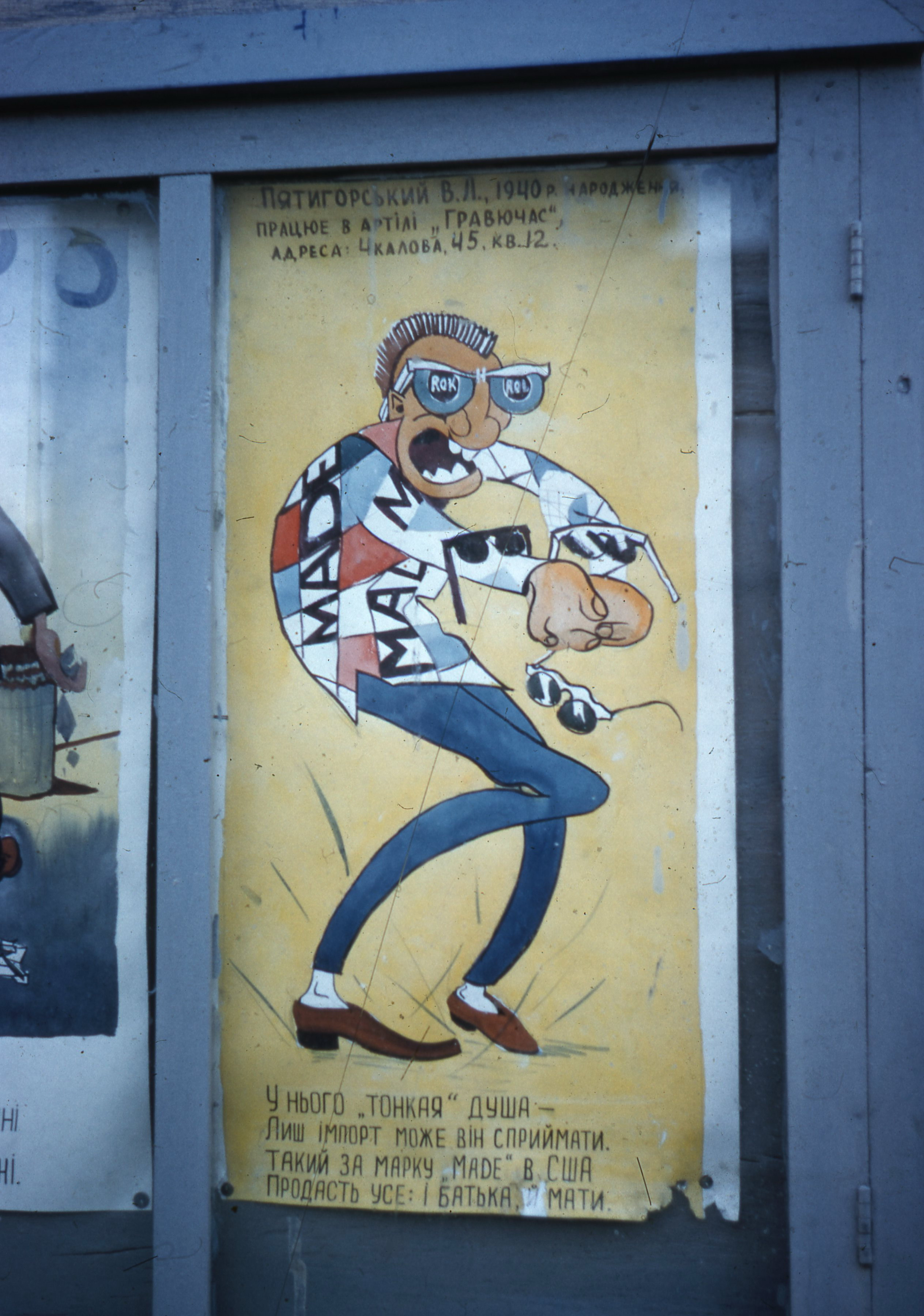
- A Ukrainian anti-stilyagi poster on display in a window in the Soviet Union, c. 1950s-1970s
- Years active: 1940s–1960s
- Country: Soviet Union
- Influences: Zagranitsa, Beat movement

Stilyagi (стиляги, Russian pronunciation: [sʲtʲɪˈlʲæɡʲɪ], lit. "stylish, style hunters") were members of a Soviet youth counterculture movement from the late 1940s until the early 1960s. A stilyaga (стиляга) was primarily distinguished by snappy clothing—preferably foreign-label clothing acquired from fartsovshchiks (black market sellers)—that contrasted with the communist realities of the time, and a fascination with zagranitsa, modern Western music and fashions corresponding to those of the Beat Generation. English writings on Soviet culture variously translated the term as "dandies", "fashionistas", "beatniks", "hipsters", or "zoot suiters".

== See also ==
- 1950s youth fashion
  - Bikini boys, a similar subculture in Poland
  - Hep cat, another Western counterpart to the Stilyagi
  - Jampec
- La Sape, a similar movement that originated in the Democratic Republic of Congo during the 1980s
  - 1980s in African fashion
  - Swenka, a South African variant in the 2010s
  - 2010s in African fashion
- The Moon is a Harsh Mistress, a 1966 novel by Robert A. Heinlein describing a similar fictional subculture on the Moon
- Potápky, Czech urban youth subculture
- Swingjugend, youth culture in Nazi Germany
