= Halbstarke =

Term describing a 1950s German youth subculture

Halbstarke (German: [ˈhalpʃtaʁkə], lit. "half-strengths", loosely "greaser" or "rocker") is a German term describing a postwar-period subculture of adolescents – mostly male and of working class parents – that appeared in public in an aggressive and provocative way during the 1950s in West Germany, Austria and Switzerland. In German, the term is still in use today for young, aggressive, mostly male adolescents.

== Literal meaning ==
The word itself literally means “the half-strong”. But it is likely that any defamatory meaning was not very defamatory to the subculture itself, because its members began calling themselves “Halbstarke”, too. In German, both terms also have an adjective-form (halbstark / halbgewalkt).

== “Halbstarke“ during the 50s ==
These Halbstarke had found prototypes for their fashion and style in American movies, e.g. James Dean in Rebel Without a Cause (German title: …denn sie wissen nicht, was sie tun) and Marlon Brando, as well as the stars of rock 'n' roll, that was gaining popularity then. In 1956, Karin Baal and Horst Buchholz became idols thanks to the movie Die Halbstarken. That same year Bill Haley & His Comets' song Rock Around The Clock reached #1 in the West German Pop charts. Often, the Halbstarken wore a quiff, jeans, checked shirts and leather jackets. Their look separated them from the other, more widespread, West German youth culture. Mopeds and motorbikes were very popular and used for riding in 'gangs' (as seen in American movies). Because there weren't a lot of alternatives, the Halbstarken often spent their leisure time outdoors. Their cliques met at corners of the road, in parks or at other public places. This behaviour wasn't appreciated by elder citizens and so they described it as “bumming around” (gammeln). Rock 'n' roll offered tunes and rhythms that were revolutionary and a catalyzer for the youths' emotions and fears, unlike the then-popular but shallow genre Schlager. The effect of this was probably maximized by the new music being rejected by wide parts of the population. During the 1950s, more or less 5% of youth could be referred to as Halbstarke.

== Riots by the Halbstarken ==
The first Halbstarken riots happened after concerts or cinema screenings, which usually were preceded later uprisings as well. On December 30, 1956, about 4,000 juveniles walked through Dortmund's city, affronting passers-by, rampaging and having battles with the police, after a cinema show of Außer Rand und Band (Rock Around the Clock with Bill Haley). Big riots occurred especially from 1956 to 1958. Often, the furniture of cinemas and concert halls was totally destroyed. These riots started severe discussions in media and politics. The seeming sense- and directionlessness of the riots wasn't comprehensible. Often, the American popular culture was considered guilty. Nowadays, the riots and all of the Halbstarken-phenomenon is seen as a protest against society and its authorities which seemed draconic and bleak. But the protest was neither organized nor politically motivated.

== Literature ==
- Poiger, Uta G.: Jazz, Rock and Rebels, 2000.
- Maase, Kaspar: BRAVO Amerika, Hamburg 1992.
- Schildt, Axel: Modernisierung und Wiederaufbau, Bonn 1993.
- Grotum, Thomas: Die Halbstarken. Zur Geschichte einer Jugendkultur der 50er Jahre, Frankfurt am Main, 1994.
