= Southside Festival =

Annual music festival that takes place near Tuttlingen, Germany

Coordinates: 47°58′37″N 8°54′15″E

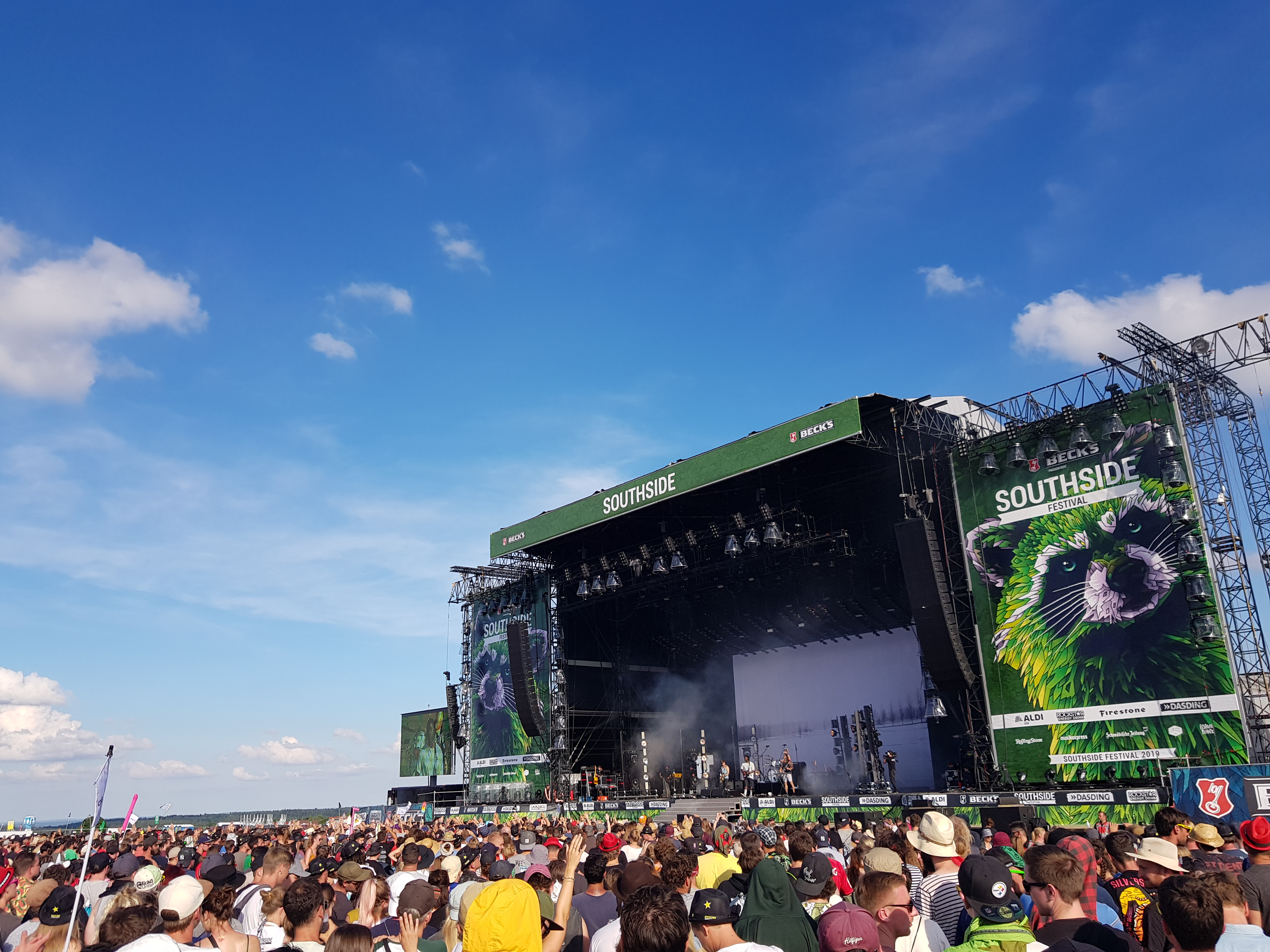
- Genre: Alternative rock
- Dates: June
- Locations: Neuhausen ob Eck Airfield, Neuhausen ob Eck, Germany (2002–present)
- Years active: 1999–present
- Attendance: 40,000 (2015)
- Website: Festival Website

The Southside Festival (simply known as Southside) is an annual music festival that takes place near Tuttlingen, Germany, usually every June. The festival as well as its artists and audiences are generally associated within the alternative part of popular music.

The Hurricane Festival, often referred to as the "sister" of Southside, takes place on the same three days in the very north of Germany (contrary to Southside, which is in the very south).

== General information ==
The name Southside refers to Southern Germany where the festival takes place. Festival organizers are FKP Scorpio and KOKO & DTK Entertainment. The festival site consists of 800,000 square meters of former military and airport precincts and features four stages. The festival first took place on the former military airport of Neubiberg (Munich) with approximately 15,000 visitors. In 2002, the number of visitors had risen to 30,000 and kept rising up to 60,000. The revenue for one festival weekend, according to the organizers, amounts to between five and ten million euros. The paramedic service is provided by the Malteser Hilfsdienst, the Johanniter-Unfall-Hilfe (regional association Bodensee-Oberschwaben) and the German Red Cross. Throughout the entire weekend, around 400 helpers do approximately 12,000 hours of work. Crowd surfing is strictly against the festival's safety policy.

=== History ===
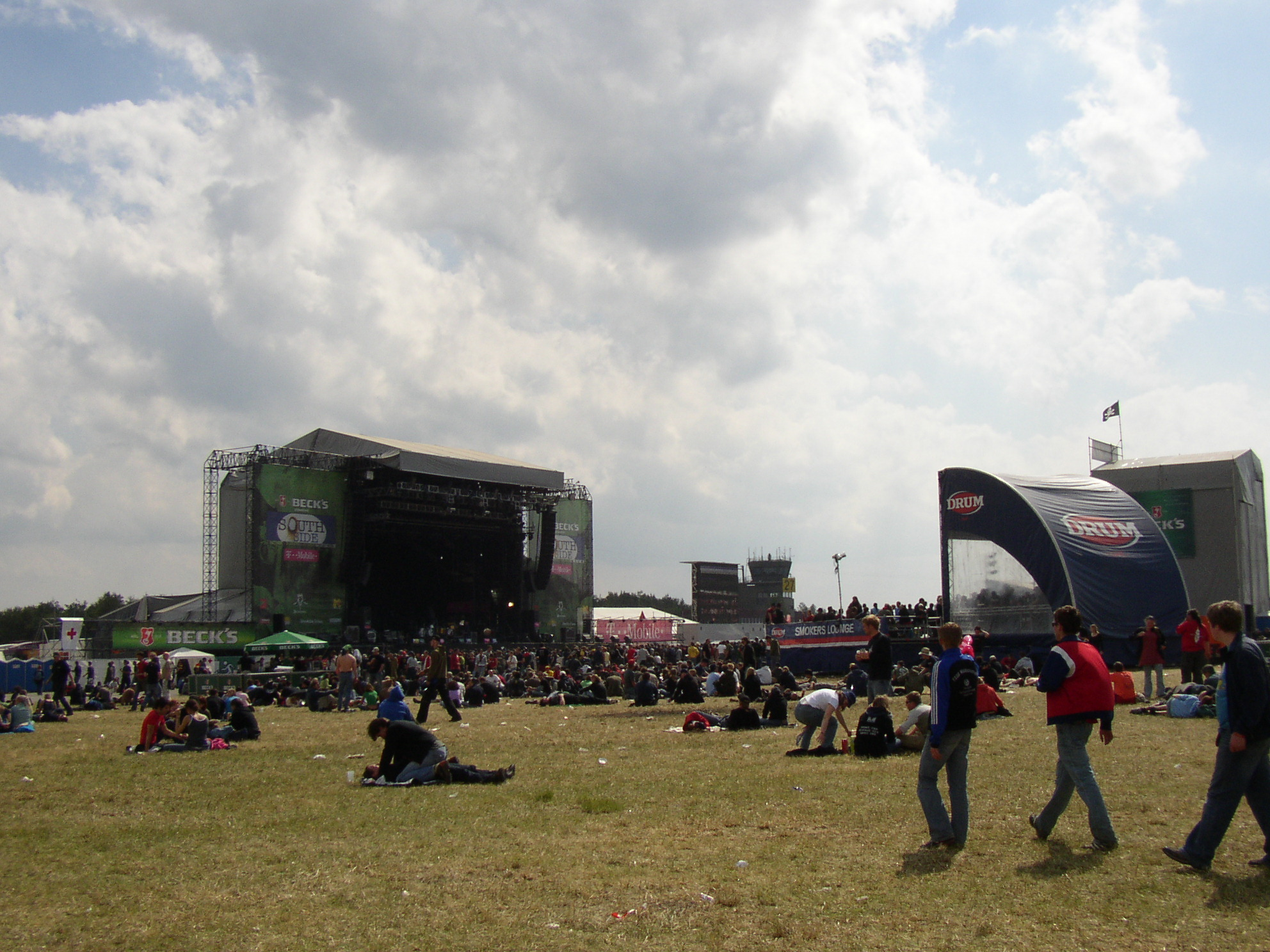
Southside Festival in 2005

The Southside festival first took place in 1999 as a counterpart to Hurricane festival. In 2000, it was moved to Neuhausen ob Eck. Recurring musical acts included:

- Queens of the Stone Age (1999, 2001, 2002, 2005, 2007, 2013)
- Flogging Molly (2005, 2008, 2011, 2014, 2016, 2017)
- The Sounds (2003, 2006, 2007, 2009, 2011, 2014)
- Billy Talent (2004, 2006, 2008, 2010, 2013, 2018)
- Beatsteaks (2002, 2004, 2005, 2008, 2010)
- Black Rebel Motorcycle Club (2002, 2004, 2008, 2015, 2018)
- NOFX (2003, 2008, 2013, 2015, 2018)

==== 2007 (storm incident) ====
On the Thursday evening preceding the start of the festival, a storm demolished the tent stage and hurled large and heavy poles through the air. One such pole went through the roof of a paramedic van parked near the stage, killing one occupant and seriously injuring the other. The tent stage acts had to be canceled as a consequence. Festival organizers considered canceling the festival, but decided against it on advice of police, local authorities and even the paramedics team. The two main stages also suffered damage but were sufficiently repaired in time.

==== 2008 ====
In 2008, the festival took place from 20 June to 22 June. It sold out at around 50,000 tickets and registered a new visitor record. The number of visitors and the hot weather led to a water shortage on Sunday at 11 am.

Musical acts on all three stages consisted of:

Apoptygma Berzerk, Bat for Lashes, Beatsteaks, Bell X1, Biffy Clyro, Billy Talent, Black Rebel Motorcycle Club, British Sea Power, Calexico, Deichkind, Die Mannequin, Digitalism, Does It Offend You, Yeah?, Donots, Elbow, Enter Shikari, Flogging Molly, Foals, Foo Fighters, Jaguar Love, Jan Delay & Disko No 1, Jason Mraz, Jennifer Rostock, Johnny Foreigner, Kaiser Chiefs, Kettcar, Krieger, Madsen, Maxïmo Park, Millencolin, Monster Magnet, Nada Surf, NOFX, Oceansize, Operator Please, Panic! at the Disco, Panteón Rococó, Patrice, Paul Heaton, Radiohead, Razorlight, Rise Against, Rodrigo y Gabriela, Shantel & Bucovina Club Orkestar, Shy Guy At The Show, Sigur Rós, Slut, Tegan and Sara, The (International) Noise Conspiracy, The Beautiful Girls, The Chemical Brothers, The Cribs, The Enemy, The Flyer, The Kooks, The Notwist, The Pigeon Detectives, The Subways, The Weakerthans, The Wombats, Tocotronic, Turbostaat, Wrongkong, Xavier Rudd.

In addition, the quarterfinals of the UEFA Euro 2008 were broadcast on the big screen.

==== 2009 ====
In 2009, the Southside Festival took place from 19 June to 21 June. After increasing the capacity to 55,000 visitors, the festival was not sold out with 50,000 visitors. The headliners were Die Ärzte, Kings of Leon and Faith No More.

==== 2010 ====
The Southside Festival 2010, which took place from 18 June to 20 June, was sold out with 50,000 visitors. According to the organizer, it would have been possible to sell 100,000 tickets – two times more visitors than the terrain could hold.[19] For the first time a fourth stage, called "White Stage", got introduced. This tent complemented the main stage ("Green Stage"), the side stage ("Blue Stage") and the second tent ("Red Stage"). In the late afternoon, Electro music was played in this tent. The motto of the second, new tent was "Electric Circus". Headliner of the 2010 festival were Billy Talent, The Strokes, Massive Attack, Mando Diao, The Prodigy, Deichkind and Beatsteaks. With a big screen, the organizer made a broadcast of the FIFA World Cup possible. Due to continuous rain the entire camping and festival terrain turned into mud. In the night of 17 to 18 June, an event of heavy rain (precipitation: 80 L/m^{2}) required an array of workers, iron sheets, over 500m² of wood chips and several semi-trailers of hay, as well as heavy technical equipment to make both entries to the festival terrain passable again.

In addition, the period reached cold temperatures below 10 degrees Celsius. For this reason, the community opened the Homburghalle, and many residents provided private accommodation and showers. On the day of departure, many vehicles got stuck in the mud and had to be salvaged by farmers with their tractors. Furthermore, the Bundesstraße 311 was so slippery from the mud, which the cars brought from the meadow to the roadway, that it had to be cleaned again and again with special machines. A total of 1800 employees were employed on the grounds during the festival, including 420 paramedics and doctors, around 400 security guards and stewards, as well as stage technicians and other helpers. At the end of the events, 450 mobile toilets had to be emptied and 80,000 rubbish sacks had to be disposed of. The amount of rubbish was immense due to the weather in 2010. Since the festival visitors had left more rubbish behind this year than usual, but it sank into the mud and became solid again, some areas had to be ploughed or dug up, levelled, filled up and reseeded. The festival's visitors had to be able to use the waste for the first time in their lives.

==== 2011 ====
Neuhausen ob Eck was the venue of the Southside Festival for the twelfth time from 17 to 19 June 2011. Two days before the line-up began, the festival was sold out with more than 50,000 visitors. For the festival 81 artists were engaged: Also in 2011, there were four stages - two open-air stages and two tent stages. On the fourth stage, called the white stage, which was usually reserved for electric acts, there were additional shows consisting out of acrobatics underlined with electronic music. Newly introduced measurements to protect the environment were, "Green Camping", CO_{2} reduction due to new ways of arriving at the festival and avoidance of creating paper waste. The manager of the estate park outlined at the Southside festival in 2011, that it would be the last one for the time being. Reason for that was the weather. The previous 3 years have been rainy which resulted in the ground being completely sodden, so there was a possibility of the festival not being held for the next 2 to 3 years so the ground could regenerate. The consequences of the mud in 2010, were that the grass only could spear sparsely which is why the soil was then even more in danger. The wood chips which were spread out in front of all the stages also massively acidifies the soil. Als Vorkehrung gegen eine Verschlammung wurden an vielen Stellen Plastikmatten ausgelegt. As a measurement against siltation, some places of the festival area were carpeted with plastic mats.[31] As the festival 2011 was still going on the promoter already announced on 19 June, that even though they have been having mud problems in the years of 2010 and 2011 there is again going to be a festival in Neuhausen ob Eck in 2012, no matter the weather. For this purpose a five-year contract was closed.

==== 2012 ====
Two headliners for the Festival in 2012 were confirmed: Blink-182, who was supposed to perform in 2011, and Die Ärtzte, who already performed at the Festival in 2002, 2005 and 2009. Due to problems in the past years, six-figure sums of money were invested into the preparation of the ground. Many of the lawns were supposed to be graveled.

==== 2013 ====
The Southside Festival 2013 took place from 21 to 23 June. It sold out, totaling 60,000 visitors.

==== 2014 ====
The Southside Festival 2014 started on Friday 20 June and ended on Sunday the 22nd.

==== 2015 ====
The Southside Festival 2015 took place from 19 to 21 June. The line-up was:

Placebo, Florence + the Machine, Farin Urlaub Racing Team, Paul Kalkbrenner, Deadmau5, Marteria, Alt-J, Jan Delay & Disko No. 1, Cro, Madsen, The Gaslight Anthem, Katzenjammer, Milky Chance, LaBrassBanda, Noel Gallagher's High Flying Birds, Parov Stelar Band, Of Monsters and Men, George Ezra, NOFX, Die Antwoord, Angus & Julia Stone, Death Cab for Cutie, Alligatoah, Frittenbude, Death from Above 1979, 257ers, Black Rebel Motorcycle Club, Irie Révoltés, Suicidal Tendencies, Future Islands, The Notwist, Counting Crows, SDP, The Cat Empire, Backyard Babies, Danko Jones, The Tallest Man on Earth, Kontra K, Olli Schulz, All Time Low, Band of Skulls, The Vaccines, Lagwagon, Millencolin, Jupiter Jones, Chet Faker, First Aid Kit, Sheppard, Kodaline, Casper, Back and Fill, Antiheld, Montreal, AronChupa, Superheld, The Mirror Trap, Oscar and the Wolf, Little May, The Bohicas, Gengahr, Nothing But Thieves, Schmutzki, SomeKindaWonderful, We Are The Ocean, Big Sean, Archive, Burning Down Alaska, uvm.

==== 2016 ====
The Southside Festival 2016 should have taken place from 24 to 26 June. Due to severe thunderstorms after the first concerts in the early Friday evening, the festival had to be postponed. Later on, it had to be cancelled completely so that none of the headliners were able to play. Only 18 of 88 bands that were booked were able to perform. The concerts of Tom Odell, Elliphant and Flogging Molly had to be ended prematurely. 82 people were slightly injured. 25 of them were brought to the hospital in Tuttlingen while 57 could be treated on-site.

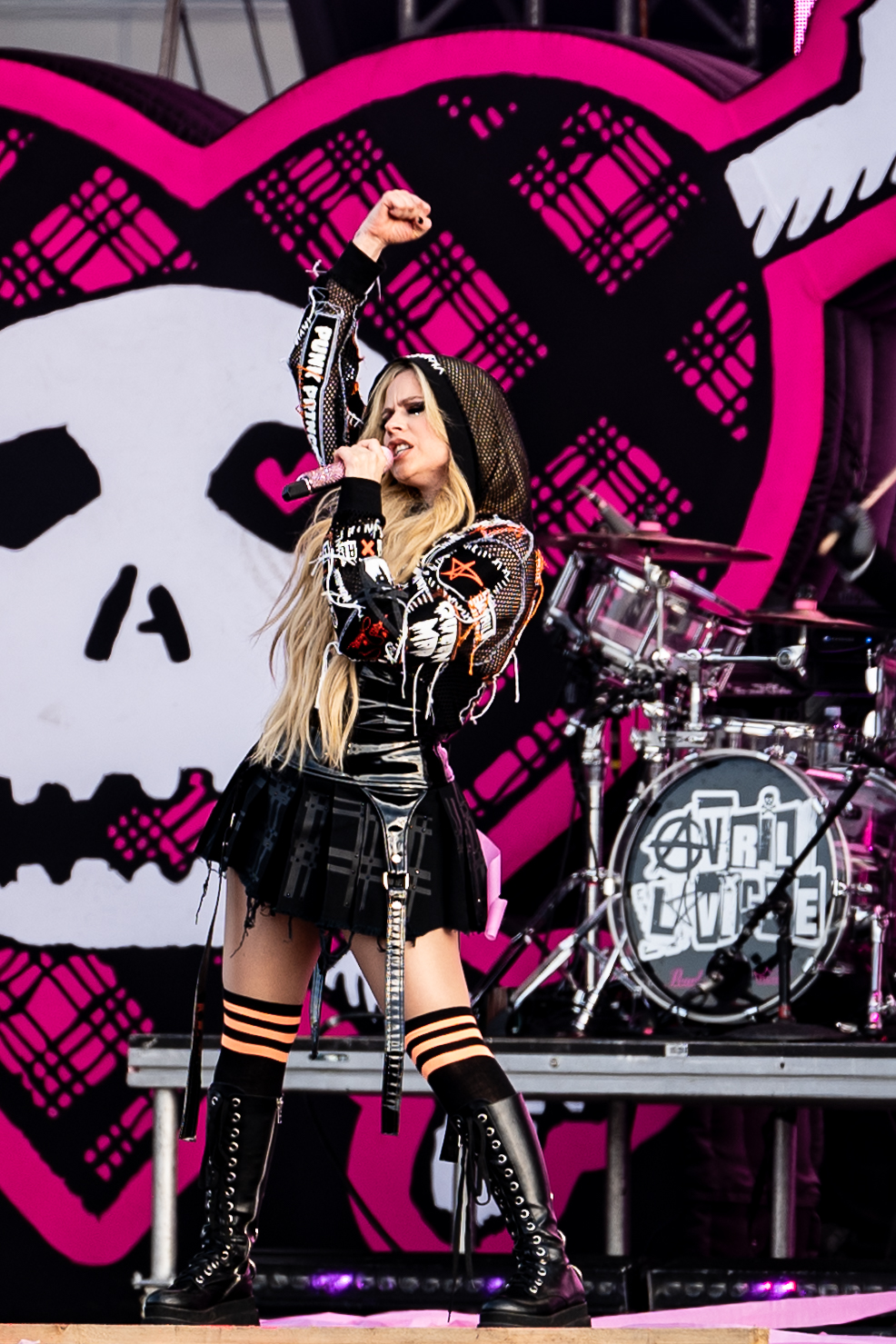
Avril Lavigne at Southside Festival 2024

==== 2017 ====
The festival took place from 23 to 25 June 2017. Because of technical difficulties affecting the Green Stage, the concert of Green Day had to be paused and finally cancelled after two hours.

==== 2018 ====
The Southside Festival 2018 started on 22 June and ended on the 24th.

==== 2019 ====
The festival took place from 21 to 23 June 2019.

== Past lineups ==
=== 2000s ===
2001

- Ash
- Backyard Babies
- Blackmail
- Die Happy
- Donots
- Faithless
- Fantomas
- Fink
- Fun Lovin' Criminals
- Fünf Sterne deluxe
- Goldfinger
- Grand Theft Audio
- The Hellacopters
- The Hives
- Iggy Pop
- Incubus
- JJ72
- Krezip
- K's Choice
- Last Days of April
- Manu Chao
- Nashville Pussy
- The Offspring
- OPM
- Paradise Lost
- Phoenix
- Placebo
- Queens of the Stone Age
- Slut
- Stereo MCs
- Suit Yourself
- Thomas D
- Tool
- Die Toten Hosen
- The Weakerthans
- Weezer
- Wheatus

2002

- ...And You Will Know Us by the Trail of Dead
- A
- Die Ärzte
- Beatsteaks
- Black Rebel Motorcycle Club
- The Breeders
- Dover
- Emil Bulls
- The Flaming Sideburns
- Garbage
- Gluecifer
- Heyday
- The (International) Noise Conspiracy
- Jasmin Tabatabai
- Lambretta
- Less Than Jake
- Lostprophets
- Madrugada
- Mercury Rev
- Nelly Furtado
- New Order
- No Doubt
- The Notwist
- The Promise Ring
- Queens of the Stone Age
- Readymade
- Red Hot Chili Peppers
- Rival Schools
- Simian
- Simple Plan
- Soulfly
- Sportfreunde Stiller
- Such A Surge
- Suit Yourself
- Television
- Tocotronic
- Union Youth
- Zornik

2003

- 22-20s
- Apocalyptica
- Asian Dub Foundation
- Beth Gibbons and Rustin Man
- Blackmail
- Brendan Benson
- Coldplay
- Conic
- Console
- Counting Crows
- Danko Jones
- The Datsuns
- Fu Manchu
- Goldfrapp
- Good Charlotte
- Grandaddy
- Guano Apes
- GusGus
- The Hellacopters
- International Pony
- Interpol
- Kettcar
- Live
- Massive Attack
- The Mighty Mighty Bosstones
- Millencolin
- Moloko
- Nada Surf
- NOFX
- Patrice
- Pete Yorn
- Pinkostar
- Radiohead
- The Roots
- Röyksopp
- Seeed
- Sigur Rós with Amiina
- Skin
- Slut
- The Sounds
- Starsailor
- Supergrass
- Therapy?
- Turbonegro
- Underwater Circus
- Underworld
- Union Youth

2004

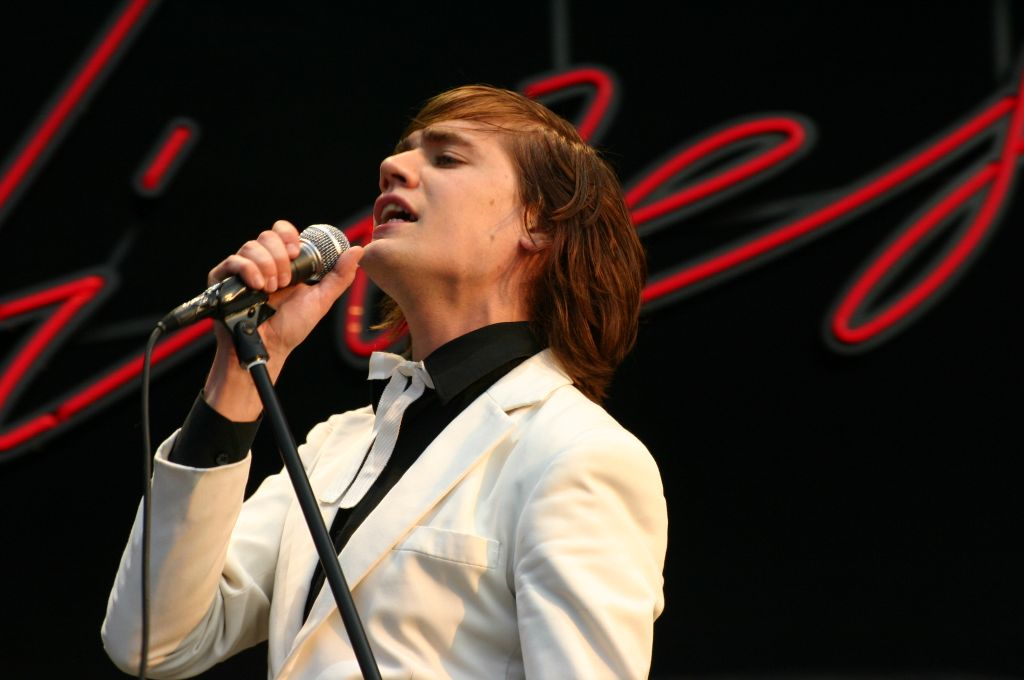
The Hives singer Pelle Almqvist at the 2004 festival

- Air
- Amplifier
- Anti-Flag
- Ash
- Backyard Babies
- Beatsteaks
- Beginner
- Billy Talent
- Black Rebel Motorcycle Club
- The Bones
- Breed 77
- Bright Eyes
- Bungalow Bang Boys
- Colour of Fire
- The Cure
- Cypress Hill
- Danko Jones
- Die Happy
- Dropkick Murphys
- Die Fantastischen Vier
- Fireball Ministry
- Franz Ferdinand
- Fünf Sterne deluxe
- Gentleman & The Far East Band
- Gluecifer
- Graham Coxon
- grannysmith
- The Hives
- I Am Kloot
- Ill Niño
- The (International) Noise Conspiracy
- Jupiter Jones
- Die Kleinen Götter
- Life of Agony
- Mando Diao
- Mclusky
- Mogwai
- Monster Magnet
- Pixies
- PJ Harvey
- Placebo
- Sarah Bettens
- Snow Patrol
- Sportfreunde Stiller
- Tomte
- Wilco
- Within Temptation

2005

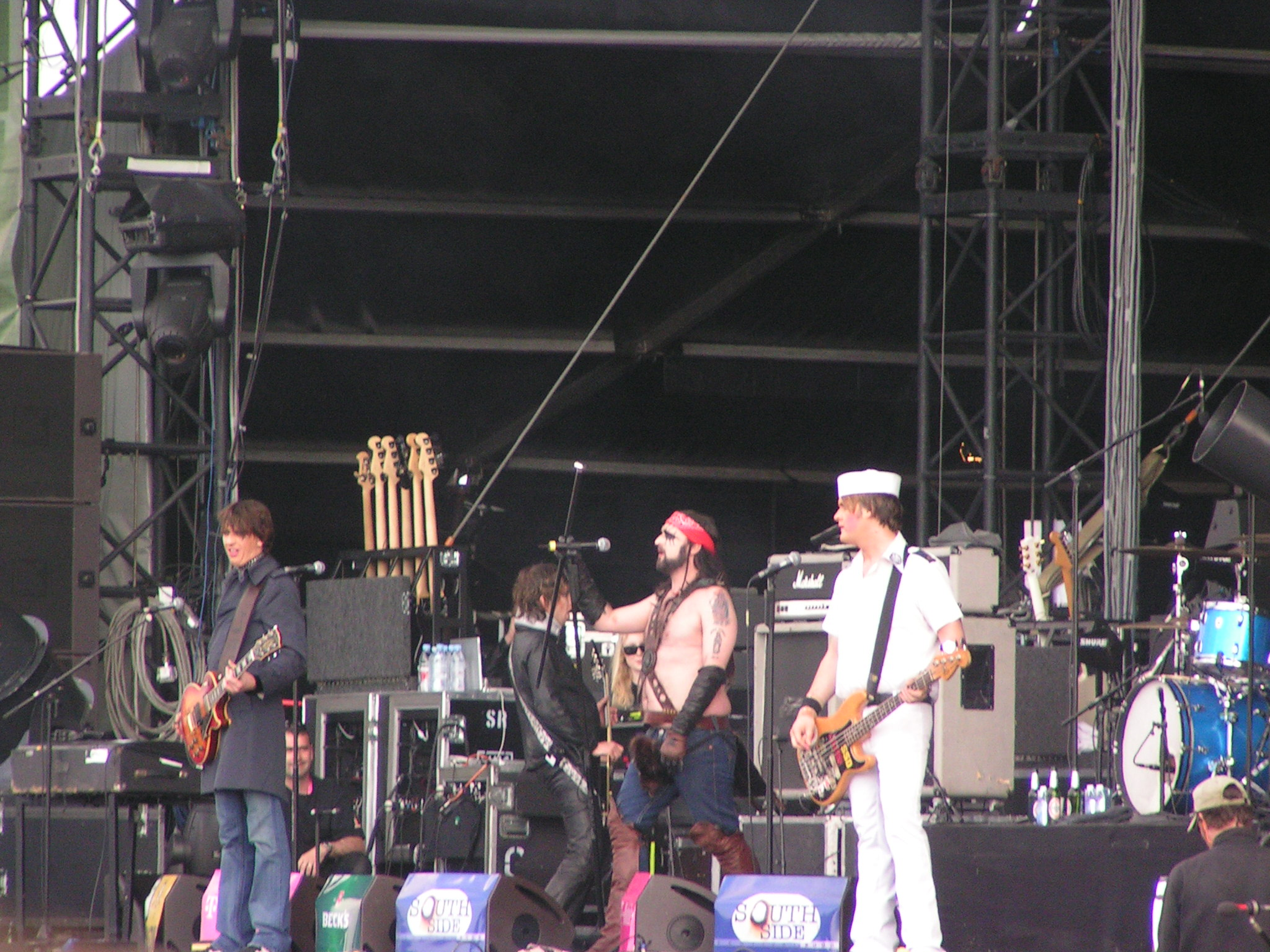
Turbonegro performing at the 2005 festival

- 2raumwohnung
- Amplifier
- ...And You Will Know Us by the Trail of Dead
- Athlete
- Audioslave
- Beatsteaks
- Beck
- Boysetsfire
- Brendan Benson
- Broken Social Scene
- Die Ärzte
- Dinosaur Jr.
- Dioramic
- The Dresden Dolls
- Eagles of Death Metal
- Fantômas
- Feist
- Flogging Molly
- Idlewild
- Ken
- Kettcar
- La Vela Puerca
- Long Jones
- Madrugada
- Madsen
- Mando Diao
- Millencolin
- Moneybrother
- New Order
- Nine Inch Nails
- Oasis
- Phoenix
- Queens of the Stone Age
- Rammstein
- Sarah Bettens
- Ska-P
- Slut
- System of a Down
- Team Sleep
- The Eighties Matchbox B-Line Disaster
- The Robocop Kraus
- The Stands
- Turbonegro
- Underoath
- Wir sind Helden

2006

- Adam Green
- The Answer
- Apocalyptica
- Archive
- Arctic Monkeys
- Ben Harper & the Innocent Criminals
- Ben Jammin
- Billy Talent
- Blackmail
- Coheed and Cambria
- The Cooper Temple Clause
- Death Cab for Cutie
- Nada Surf
- dEUS
- Delays
- Donavon Frankenreiter
- Duels
- Elbow
- Element of Crime
- Fettes Brot
- Hard-Fi
- Karamelo Santo
- Klee
- Lagwagon
- The Lightning Seeds
- Live
- Mad Caddies
- Mando Diao
- Manu Chao Radio Bemba Sound System
- Maxïmo Park
- Photonensurfer
- The Raconteurs
- Muse
- Panteón Rococó
- Seeed
- Shout Out Louds
- Sigur Rós
- Skin
- The Brian Jonestown Massacre
- The Cardigans
- The Feeling
- The Hives
- The Kooks
- The Strokes
- Tomte
- Two Gallants
- Wallis Bird
- The Weepies
- Wir sind Helden
- Within Temptation
- Wolfmother
- Zebrahead

2007

- Arcade Fire
- Beastie Boys
- Bloc Party
- Bright Eyes
- Cold War Kids
- Deichkind
- Die Fantastischen Vier
- Dropkick Murphys
- Editors
- Fotos
- Incubus
- Interpol
- Jet
- Juliette and the Licks
- Kings of Leon
- La Vela Puerca
- Less Than Jake
- Manic Street Preachers
- Marilyn Manson
- Me First and the Gimme Gimmes
- Pearl Jam
- Placebo
- Queens of the Stone Age
- Snow Patrol
- Sonic Youth
- The Brayndead Freakshow
- Sugarplum Fairy
- The Bravery
- The Films
- The Sounds
- Tokyo Police Club

2008

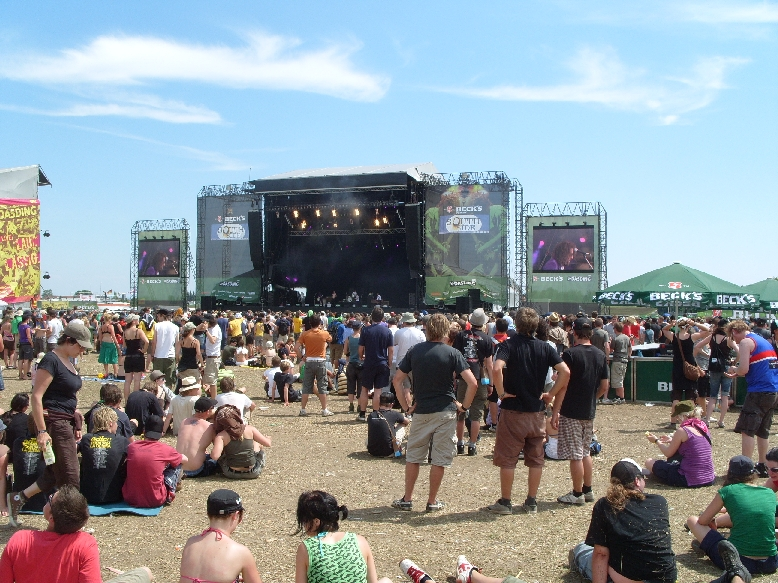
2008 festival

- Radiohead
- Foo Fighters
- British Sea Power
- Maxïmo Park
- Nada Surf
- Tegan and Sara
- The Chemical Brothers
- The Kooks
- The Weakerthans
- Turbostaat
- Panic! at the Disco
- Elbow
- Flogging Molly
- Calexico
- Billy Talent
- Panteón Rococó

2009

- Die Ärzte
- Anti-Flag
- Ben Harper
- Blood Red Shoes
- Brand New
- Clueso
- Culcha Candela
- Dendemann
- Disturbed
- Duffy
- Eagles of Death Metal
- Editors
- Eskimo Joe
- Faith No More
- Fettes Brot
- Fleet Foxes
- Frank Turner
- Franz Ferdinand
- Friendly Fires
- Get Well Soon
- Gogol Bordello
- Johnossi
- Karamelo Santo
- Katy Perry
- Kings of Leon
- Kraftwerk
- Less Than Jake
- Lykke Li
- Moby
- Nick Cave and the Bad Seeds
- Nine Inch Nails
- No Use for a Name
- Paolo Nutini
- Ska-P
- Social Distortion
- The Asteroids Galaxy Tour
- The Gaslight Anthem
- The Living End
- The Mars Volta
- The Ting Tings
- The Whip
- The Wombats

=== 2010s ===
2010

- Archive
- Band of Skulls
- Beatsteaks
- Biffy Clyro
- Bigelf
- Billy Talent
- Bonaparte
- Boys Noize
- Charlie Winston
- Coheed and Cambria
- Cosmo Jarvis
- Cymbals Eat Guitars
- Danko Jones
- Deftones
- Deichkind
- Dendemann
- Does It Offend You, Yeah?
- Donots
- Dropkick Murphys
- Element of Crime
- Enter Shikari
- Erol Alkan
- Faithless
- Florence and the Machine
- FM Belfast
- Frank Turner
- Frittenbude
- Horse the Band
- Hot Water Music
- Ignite
- Jack Johnson
- Jennifer Rostock
- K's Choice
- Kashmir
- Katzenjammer
- La Roux
- LaBrassBanda
- LCD Soundsystem
- Madsen
- Mando Diao
- Marina and the Diamonds
- Massive Attack
- Moneybrother
- Mr. Oizo
- Paramore
- Phoenix
- Porcupine Tree
- Revolverheld
- Shout Out Louds
- Skindred
- Skunk Anansie
- Stone Temple Pilots
- Tegan and Sara
- The Bloody Beetroots
- The Gaslight Anthem
- The Get Up Kids
- The Hold Steady
- The Prodigy
- The Specials
- The Strokes
- The Temper Trap
- The xx
- Timid Tiger
- Turbostaat
- Two Door Cinema Club
- Vampire Weekend
- We Are Scientists
- White Lies
- Zebrahead

2011

- Foo Fighters
- Incubus
- Arcade Fire
- The Chemical Brothers
- Portishead
- Arctic Monkeys
- Kaiser Chiefs
- My Chemical Romance
- Clueso
- The Hives
- Suede
- Kasabian
- The Subways
- Gogol Bordello
- Flogging Molly
- Elbow
- The Wombats
- Jimmy Eat World
- Sublime with Rome
- Two Door Cinema Club
- Boysetsfire
- Monster Magnet
- The Kills
- Lykke Li
- Selig
- Kashmir
- Glasvegas
- Band of Horses
- The Sounds
- Bright Eyes
- Sum 41
- All Time Low
- Klaxons
- Eels
- Sick of It All
- Parkway Drive
- William Fitzsimmons
- Blood Red Shoes
- Jupiter Jones
- I Blame Coco
- Irie Révoltés
- Young Rebel Set
- I Am Kloot
- Friendly Fires
- Darwin Deez
- Comeback Kid
- Converge
- The Asteroids Galaxy Tour
- Portugal. The Man
- Warpaint
- The Vaccines
- An Horse
- Pulled Apart by Horses
- Kvelertak
- You Me at Six
- Brother
- Tame Impala
- Cloud Control
- Miles Kane
- Yoav
- Digitalism
- Crookers
- Trentemøller
- A-Trak
- Hercules and Love Affair
- Frittenbude
- Egotronic

2012

- Die Ärzte
- The Cure
- Blink-182
- Justice
- Rise Against
- The Stone Roses
- Mumford & Sons
- Sportfreunde Stiller
- The Kooks
- The xx
- New Order
- Noel Gallagher's High Flying Birds
- Wolfmother
- LaBrassBanda
- Casper
- Katzenjammer
- Kettcar
- The Mars Volta
- The Shins
- Broilers
- Florence and The Machine
- Madsen
- Garbage
- Thees Uhlmann & Band
- Eagles Of Death Metal
- The Temper Trap
- Beirut
- Bosse
- Bonaparte
- Boy
- Kraftklub
- Ed Sheeran
- K.I.Z
- City And Colour
- Bat For Lashes
- Jennifer Rostock
- Frank Turner & The Sleeping Souls
- Royal Republic
- Pennywise
- Lagwagon
- M83
- Hot Water Music
- Mad Caddies
- La Vela Puerca
- Kakkmaddafakka
- The Vaccines
- Less Than Jake
- Zebrahead
- My Morning Jacket
- All Shall Perish
- My Morning Jacket
- The Dø
- Adept
- Selah Sue
- The Bronx
- La Dispute
- Little Dragon
- Disco Ensemble
- Band Of Skulls
- GusGus
- Nneka
- Bombay Bicycle Club
- M.Ward
- Die Antwoord
- Spector
- Black Box Revelation
- Young Guns
- Other Lives
- Twin Shadow
- The Computers
- Nerina Pallot
- Switchfoot
- Eastern Conference Champions
- Kurt Vile & The Violators
- All The Young
- Hoffmaestro
- Golden Kanine
- Turbowolf
- We Are Augustines
- Willy Moon
- Alt-J
- Casting Louis
- Fritz Kalkbrenner
- Steve Aoki
- Sebastian
- Beardyman
- Busy P
- Bassnectar
- Azari & III
- Supershirt
- Bratze
- Dumme Jungs

2013

- Parov Stelar
- Gesaffelstein
- Archive (band)
- Netsky (musician)
- Rammstein
- Billy Talent
- Queens of the Stone Age
- NOFX
- Passenger (singer)
- Frittenbude
- Macklemore & Ryan Lewis
- Triggerfinger
- Kyteman
- Arctic Monkeys
- Deichkind
- Paul Kalkbrenner
- Sigur Rós
- Bloc Party
- Ska-P
- The Gaslight Anthem
- The Hives
- Of Monsters and Men
- Belle and Sebastian
- Marteria
- Left Boy
- Prinz Pi
- Dallas Green (musician)
- Boysetsfire
- Danko Jones
- Callejon (band)
- Friska Viljor
- Every Time I Die
- The Devil Wears Prada (band)
- Turbostaat
- The Bouncing Souls
- C2C (group)
- Two Door Cinema Club

2014

- Abby
- Angus & Julia Stone
- Apologies, I Have None
- Arcade Fire
- Augustines
- Baauer
- Bad Religion
- Balthazar
- Bastille
- Belle and Sebastian
- Bilderbuch
- Blaudzun
- Blood Red Shoes
- Bombay Bicycle Club
- Bonaparte
- Bosse
- Bring Me the Horizon
- Broilers
- Casper
- Chuck Ragan
- Chvrches
- Circa Waves
- Crookers
- Dave Hause
- Deaf Havana
- Dispatch
- Donots
- Drenge
- Dropkick Murphys
- Ed Sheeran
- Egotronic
- Elbow
- Family of the Year
- Feine Sahne Fischfilet
- Fettes Brot
- Flogging Molly
- Franz Ferdinand
- Fucked Up
- Fünf Sterne deluxe
- George Ezra
- Heisskalt
- I Heart Sharks
- Interpol
- James Blake
- Jennifer Rostock
- Johnny Flynn & The Sussex Wit
- Kavinsky
- Kraftklub
- Lily Allen
- London Grammar
- Lykke Li
- Macklemore & Ryan Lewis
- Marathonmann
- Marcus Wiebusch
- Marek Hemmann
- Metronomy
- Midlake
- Moderat
- Moonbootica
- Panteón Rococó
- Passenger
- Pixies
- Poliça
- Rodrigo y Gabriela
- Royal Blood
- Samaris
- Seeed
- Selah Sue
- Skindred
- The 1975
- The Asteroids Galaxy Tour
- The Black Keys
- The Bots
- The Dillinger Escape Plan
- The Durango Riot
- The Kooks
- The Naked and Famous
- The Sounds
- The Subways
- The Wombats
- Thees Uhlmann & band
- Tocotronic
- Tom Odell
- Twin Atlantic
- Volbeat
- We Butter the Bread with Butter
- We Invented Paris
- White Lies
- You Me at Six
- Young Rebel Set
- Zebrahead

2015

- 257ers
- Adam Angst
- Alligatoah
- All Time Low
- Alt-J
- Angus & Julia Stone
- Antemasque
- Archive
- AronChupa
- Backyard Babies
- Band of Skulls
- Big Sean
- Black Rebel Motorcycle Club
- Booka Shade
- Burning Down Alaska
- Captain Capa
- Casper
- Catfish and the Bottlemen
- Chet Faker
- Counting Crows
- Cro
- Crystal Fighters
- Danko Jones
- Darkest Hour
- Deadmau5
- Death Cab For Cutie
- Death From Above 1979
- Die Antwoord
- Dub FX
- Dumme Jungs
- Eagulls
- East Cameron Folkcore
- Every Time I Die
- Farin Urlaub Racing Team
- Fidlar
- First Aid Kit
- Frittenbude
- Florence + The Machine
- Future Islands
- Gengar
- George Ezra
- Irie Révoltés
- Jan Delay
- John Coffey
- Johnny Mauser
- Jupiter Jones
- K.I.Z.
- Katzenjammer
- Klingande
- Kodaline
- Kontra K
- LaBrassBanda
- Lagwagon
- Lillywood
- Little May
- Madeon
- Madsen
- Mantar
- Marmozets
- Marteria
- Metz
- Milky Chance
- Millencolin
- Mø
- Neonschwarz
- Noel Gallagher's High
- Flying Birds
- NOFX
- Nothing but Thieves
- Of Monsters and Men
- Olli Schulz
- Oscar and the Wolf
- Parov Stelar Band
- Paul Kalkbrenner
- Placebo
- Public Service Broadcasting
- Rone
- Schmutzki
- SDP
- Sheppard
- Shoshin
- Skinny Lister
- SomeKindaWonderful
- St. Paul & The Broken Bones
- Strung Out
- Suicidal Tendencies
- Sunset Sons
- Superheld
- Teesy
- The Bohicas
- The Cat Empire
- The Districts
- The Dø
- The Gaslight Anthem
- The Glitch Mob
- The Mirror Trap
- The Notwist
- The Tallest Man On Earth
- The Toxic Avenger
- The Vaccines
- Tonbandgerät
- Trümmer
- Turbowolf
- We Are The Ocean
- WhoMadeWho
- Zugezogen Maskulin

2016

- A-Trak
- AnnenMayKantereit
- Anti-Flag
- Augustines
- Axwell & Ingrosso
- Balthazar
- Barns Courtney
- Bear's Den
- Bloc Party
- Blossoms
- Blues Pills
- Bosse
- Boy
- BoySetsFire
- Boys Noize
- BØRNS
- Chakuza
- Chefket
- Courtney Barnett
- Deichkind
- Digitalism
- DMA'S
- Dropkick Murphys
- Editors
- Egotronic
- Elle King
- Elliphant
- Emil Bulls
- Erik Cohen
- Eskimo Callboy
- Feine Sahne Fischfilet
- Fjort
- Flogging Molly
- Fraktus
- Frank Turner & The Sleeping Souls
- Fritz Kalkbrenner
- Genetikk
- Gestört aber Geil
- Gloria
- Good Riddance
- Haftbefehl
- Half Moon Run
- Herrenmagazin
- Hiatus Kaiyote
- High As A Kite
- Ho99o9
- HVOB
- I AM JERRY
- Jack Garratt
- James Bay
- Jamie Lawson
- Jennifer Rostock
- Joris
- K.I.Z.
- Kelvin Jones
- Kiko King & Creativemaze
- Kvelertak
- Lance Butters
- Maeckes
- Marathonmann
- Maxïmo Park
- Mumford & Sons
- Oh Wonder
- Orsons
- Ostblockschlampen
- Pennywise
- Poliça
- Prinz Pi
- Rammstein
- Rampue
- Red Boy
- Royal Republic
- Ryan Bingham
- Schmutzki
- Skindred
- The Devil Makes Three
- The Fofftig Penns
- The Heavy
- The Hives
- The London Souls
- The Offspring
- The Prodigy
- The Stanfields
- The Subways
- The Wombats
- Tired Lion
- Tom Odell
- Trailerpark
- Turbostaat
- Twin Atlantic
- Two Door Cinema Club
- Tüsn
- Von Brücken
- Walk Off The Earth
- Wanda
- Weekend
- WOW
- X Ambassadors
- Yeasayer
- Zebrahead
- Zeds Dead
- Zugezogen Maskulin

2017

- 257ers
- A Day to Remember
- Ace Tee & Kwam E
- Afrob
- Alex Mofa Gang
- Alle Farben
- Alt-J
- Amber Run
- Antilopen Gang
- Archive
- Axwell & Ingrosso
- Baroness
- Bilderbuch
- Blink-182
- Boy
- Boys Noize
- Callejon
- Casper
- Clueso
- Counterfeit
- Danko Jones
- Dave Hause & The Mermaid
- Die Antwoord
- Die Boys
- Die Kassierer
- Die Orsons
- Digitalism
- Disco Ensemble
- Drunken Masters
- Editors
- Erik Cohen
- Fatoni
- Flogging Molly
- Frank Turner & The Sleeping Souls
- Frittenbude
- Fritz Kalkbrenner
- Future Islands
- Gestört aber Geil
- Gloria
- Gogol Bordello
- Green Day
- Haftbefehl
- Halsey (singer)
- Heisskalt
- Highly Suspect
- Ho99o9
- Imagine Dragons
- Irie Révoltés
- Jennifer Rostock
- Jimmy Eat World
- Joris
- JP Cooper
- K. Flay
- Kakkmaddafakka
- Kensington
- Kodaline
- Kontra K
- Leif Vollebekk
- Linkin Park
- Lorde
- Louis Berry
- LP
- Luke Noa & The Basement Beats
- Mando Diao
- Maxïmo Park
- Me First and the Gimme Gimmes
- Mikroschrei
- Milky Chance
- Modestep
- Montreal
- Moose Blood
- Nathaniel Rateliff & the Night Sweats
- Neonschwarz
- Nothing but Thieves
- Of Mice & Men
- OK Kid
- Passenger
- Pictures
- Rampue
- Rancid
- Rebels of the Jukebox
- Red Fang
- RL Grime
- Royal Blood
- Schlachthofbronx
- Seasick Steve
- SDP
- Skinny Lister
- Smile and Burn
- SSIO
- Stu Larsen
- SXTN
- Tall Heights
- The Dirty Nil
- The King Blues
- The Smith Street Band
- Tuesday Night Project
- Twin Atlantic
- Wolfmother
- Xavier Rudd
- You Me at Six

2018

- Adam Angst
- Angus & Julia Stone
- Arcade Fire
- Arctic Monkeys
- Basement
- Beginner
- Benjamin Clementine
- Biffy Clyro
- Billy Talent
- Black Rebel Motorcycle Club
- Blackout Problems
- Bonaparte
- Bonez MC & RAF Camora
- Booka Shade
- Boysetsfire
- Brian Fallon & The Howling Weather
- Brkn
- Broilers
- Chefket
- Chvrches
- Coasts
- Creeper
- Culture Abuse
- Deap Vally
- Dendemann
- Dermot Kennedy
- DMA'S
- Donots
- Drangsal
- Egotronic
- Emil Bulls
- Eskei83
- Feine Sahne Fischfilet
- Fjørt
- Frank Carter & The Rattlesnakes
- Franz Ferdinand
- Gang of Youths
- Ganz
- Gavin James
- George Ezra
- Haiyti
- Heisskalt
- Jain
- James Bay
- Jeremy Loops
- Johnossi
- Jungle
- Juse Ju
- Justice
- Kmpfsprt
- Kolari
- Kraftklub
- London Grammar
- Madsen
- Marmozets
- Marteria
- Martin Jensen
- Massendefekt
- Meute
- MHD
- Mighty Oaks
- Mike Perry
- MØ
- Moonbootica
- Neck Deep
- NOFX
- Pale Waves
- Parcels
- Pennywise
- Portugal. The Man
- Prinz Pi
- Red City Radio
- RIN
- Romano
- Samy Deluxe
- Sascha Braemer
- Schlaraffenlandung
- Stick to Your Guns
- Swiss und die Andern
- SXTN
- Talco
- The Glorious Sons
- The Hunna
- The Kooks
- The Offspring
- The Prodigy
- The Vaccines
- Thrice
- Tom Grennan
- Tom Walker
- Tommy Haug
- Tonbandgerät
- Touché Amoré
- Trettmann
- Two Door Cinema Club
- Underøath
- Valentino Khan
- Wanda
- X Ambassadors
- Yonaka

2019

- 257ers
- Alex Mofa Gang
- Alice Merton
- Alma
- AnnenMayKantereit
- Bausa
- Bear's Den
- Betontod
- Bilderbuch
- Black Honey
- Bloc Party
- Blond
- Bosse
- Christine and the Queens
- Cigarettes After Sex
- Danger Dan
- Descendents
- Die Höchste Eisenbahn
- Die Orsons
- Die Toten Hosen
- Dub FX
- Enno Bunger
- Enter Shikari
- Faber
- Flogging Molly
- Flux Pavilion
- Foo Fighters
- Frank Turner & The Sleeping Souls
- Fünf Sterne deluxe
- Grossstadtgeflüster
- Gurr
- Idles
- Interpol
- Johnny Marr
- La Dispute
- Lauv
- Leoniden
- Lion
- Macklemore
- Me First and the Gimme Gimmes
- Mischa
- Moguai
- Montreal
- Muff Potter
- Mumford & Sons
- Neonschwarz
- OK Kid
- Papa Roach
- Parkway Drive
- Pascow
- Pond
- Rosborough
- Royal Republic
- Sam Fender
- Schmutzki
- Skinny Lister
- Sofi Tukker
- Sookee
- Steiner & Madlaina
- Steve Aoki
- Swmrs
- Syml
- Tame Impala
- Teesy
- Ten Tonnes
- The Cure
- The Dirty Nil
- The Gardener & the Tree
- The Sherlocks
- The Streets
- The Wombats
- Trettmann
- Ufo361
- Voltkid
- White Denim
- Wolfmother
- You Me at Six
- Yung Hurn
- Zebrahead

== 2020s ==
2020

- Antilopen Gang
- Aurora
- BHZ
- Bad Religion
- Blond
- Blues Pills
- Bombay Bicycle Club
- Bring Me the Horizon
- Brutus
- Deichkind
- Dermot Kennedy
- Ferdinand And Left Boy
- Fil Bo Riva
- Flash Forward
- Foals
- Fontaines D.C.
- Frittenbude
- Georgia
- Giant Rooks
- Half Moon Run
- Hot Milk
- JC Stewart
- Jimmy Eat World
- Juju
- Kelvyn Colt
- Killswitch Engage
- Kings of Leon
- KitschKrieg
- Kollektiv Turmstrasse
- Kontra K
- Kummer
- LP
- Lari Luke
- Mando Diao
- Martin Garrix
- Mayday Parade
- Millencolin
- Mine
- Miya Folick
- Modeselektor Live
- Neck Deep
- Nothing but Thieves
- Nura
- Of Monsters and Men
- Oh Wonder
- PUP
- RIN
- Rise Against
- SDP
- Seeed
- Skindred
- Sofi Tukker
- Sum 41
- Swiss & die Andern
- The 1975
- The Dead South
- The Hives
- The Killers
- The Lumineers
- Thees Uhlmann & Band
- Tones and I
- Turbostaat
- Twenty One Pilots
- Von Wegen Lisbeth
- While She Sleeps
- Wolf Alice

2021 cancelled due to COVID-19 Pandemic

2022

- Alice Merton
- Antilopen Gang
- Aurora
- Avralize
- Bad Religion
- Blond
- Blues Pills
- Bring Me the Horizon
- Brutus
- Buntspecht
- Charli XCX
- Deichkind
- Dermot Kennedy
- Electric Callboy
- Felix Kummer
- Fil Bo Riva
- Flash Forward
- Foals
- Fontaines D.C.
- Frittenbude
- Giant Rooks
- Goat Girl
- Half Moon Run
- Holly Humberstone
- Hot Milk
- Idles
- Inhaler
- JC Stewart
- Jeremias
- Jimmy Eat World
- Juju
- Kat Frankie
- Kelvyn Colt
- Kings of Leon
- KitschKrieg
- K.I.Z.
- Kollektiv Turmstrasse
- Kontra K
- Lari Luke
- Left Boy
- LP
- Mando Diao
- Martin Garrix
- Megaloh
- Millencolin
- Mine
- Neck Deep
- Nura
- Nothing But Thieves
- Oh Wonder
- OK KID
- Press Club
- Provinz
- Reignwolf
- Rise Against
- Royal Blood
- The Dead South
- The Hives
- The Lathums
- The Killers
- The Stickmen Project
- Thees Uhlmann
- Tom Gregory
- Tones and I
- Turbostaat
- Twenty One Pilots
- Schmyt
- SDP
- Seeed
- Skindred
- Swiss und die Andern
- Von Wegen Lisbeth
- Wargasm
- While She Sleeps

2023

- 01099
- Akne Kid Joe
- Alle Farben
- Alli Neumann
- Anti-Flag
- Ashnikko
- Badmómzjay
- Beauty & The Beats
- Beauty School Dropout
- Betontod
- Betterov
- BHZ
- Billy Talent
- Bosse
- Bukahara
- Casper
- Chvrches
- Cloudy June
- Clueso
- Daði Freyr
- Deaf Havana
- Die Ärzte
- DMA's
- Domiziana
- Donots
- Drunken Masters
- Dylan
- Edwin Rosen
- Enter Shikari
- Fjørt
- Fortella
- Frank Turner & The Sleeping Souls
- Frittenbude
- Funeral for a Friend
- Gayle
- James Bay
- Kaffkiez
- Kaleo
- Kelsy Karter & The Heroines
- Kid Kapichi
- Kraftklub
- Lilly Palmer
- Lionheart
- Lola Marsh
- Loyle Carner
- Madsen
- Majan
- Marteria
- Mezerg
- Muse
- My Ugly Clementine
- Nina Chuba
- Ostblockschlampen
- Palaye Royale
- Pascow
- Peter Fox
- Picture This
- Placebo
- Power Plush
- Provinz
- Razz
- Rikas
- RIN
- Schmutzki
- Sleaford Mods
- Sondaschule
- Tash Sultana
- Taylor Acorn
- The 1975
- The Amazons
- The Interrupters
- The Lumineers
- The Pale White
- Trettmann
- Two Door Cinema Club
- Wanda
- Will Linley
- Queens of the Stone Age
- Zebrahead

2024

- 100 Kilo Herz
- 102 Boyz
- Aaron
- Adam Angst
- Alice Merton
- Avril Lavigne
- Ayliva
- Becky Hill
- Bess Atwell
- Booka Shade
- Bombay Bicycle Club
- Boston Manor
- Bring Me the Horizon
- Bruckner
- Brutalismus 3000
- Buntspecht
- Bury Tomorrow
- Cari Cari
- Danko Jones
- Deichkind
- Deine Cousine
- Dilla
- Ed Sheeran
- Editors
- Ennio
- Fast Boy
- Fatoni
- Feine Sahne Fischfilet
- Flore
- Fontaines D.C.
- Frank Carter & The Rattlesnakes
- Giant Rooks
- Glockenbach
- Grossstadtgeflüster
- High Vis
- IDKHOW
- Idles
- Jules
- Jungle
- Karpe
- K.I.Z.
- Kneipenchor „Mädelsabend“
- Kontra K
- Lari Luke
- Leoniden
- Maeckes
- Makko
- Malastaire
- Marathonmann
- Marsimoto
- Me First and the Gimme Gimmes
- Noga Erez
- Ottolien
- Pashanim
- Paula Carolina
- Paula Hartmann
- Querbeat
- Revol
- Ritter Lean
- Roy Bianco & Die Abbrunzati Boys
- Ruby Waters
- Sea Girls
- Sido
- Silverstein
- Simple Plan
- Ski Aggu
- Sprints
- Stella Bossi
- Stone
- Sum 41
- Team Scheisse
- The Gaslight Anthem
- The Hives
- The Kooks
- The Lathums
- The Last Dinner Party
- The Mysterines
- The National
- The Offspring
- The Reytons
- The Subways
- Tom Odell
- Turnstile
- $oho Bani

2025

- 01099
- 070 Shake
- 102 Boyz
- Alligatoah
- Amyl and the Sniffers
- AnnenMayKantereit
- Antilopen Gang
- Apache 207
- Apashe
- Bad Nerves
- Bennett
- Berq
- Bibiza
- Biffy Clyro
- Big Special
- Bilk
- Blackout Problems
- Blond
- Circa Waves
- Creeds
- Dayseeker
- Deftones
- Djo
- Dotan
- Electric Callboy
- Freddie Dredd
- Friedberg
- Freude
- Girl in Red
- Green Day
- Heisskalt
- Hot Milk
- Hot Water Music
- Ikkimel
- Irie Révoltés
- Itchy
- Jan Böhmermann & das Rundfunk-Tanzorchester Ehrenfeld
- Jeremias
- Jimmy Eat World
- Kadavar
- Kafvka
- Kalte Liebe x Caiva
- Kate Nash
- Kneecap
- Lagwagon
- Landmvrks
- Love'n'Joy
- Lucy Dacus
- Marlo Grosshardt
- Mehnersmoos
- Mothica
- Motionless in White
- Nina Chuba
- Nova Twins
- Ok.danke.tschüss
- Parcels
- Paris Paloma
- Pretty Pink
- Querbeat
- Rise Against
- Royal Republic
- Sam Fender
- Sawyer Hill
- SDP
- Slowdive
- Souly
- Steiner & Madlaina
- Swiss und die Andern
- The Backseat Lovers
- The Kiffness
- The Murder Capital
- The Prodigy
- The Wombats
- Thrice
- Tiefbasskommando
- Turbostaat
- Vicky
- Von Wegen Lisbeth
- Wet Leg
- Yellowcard
- Zartmann
- Zeal & Ardor

2026
