= OK Kid =

German pop/rap band

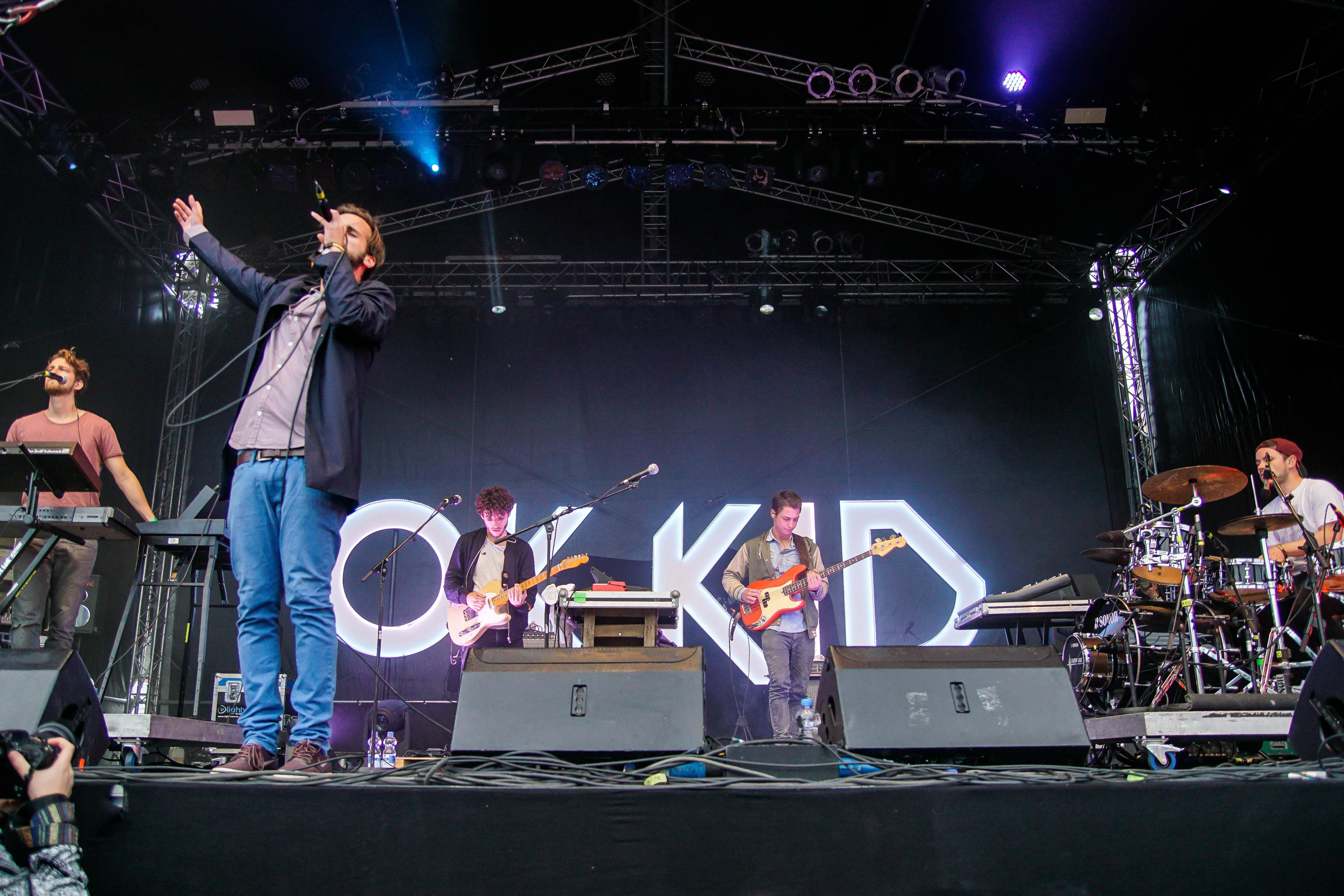
- OK Kid live at the Rocken am Brocken festival 2015

Background information
- Origin: Gießen, Germany
- Genres: Pop, rap
- Years active: 2012–present
- Label: Four Music
- Members: Jonas Schubert; Moritz Rech; Raffael "Raffi" Kühle
- Website: okkidmusik.de

OK Kid is a German band founded in mid-2012. Their name is made up of the album names OK Computer and Kid A from the band Radiohead.

== History ==
From 2006 to mid 2012, the members of OK Kid were part of a band from the Gießen region called Jona:S. ' In April 2013, the now three man band released their first album titled "OK Kid" in Cologne, produced by Sven Ludwig and Robert Koch, under the label Four Music, a subsidiary of Sony Music. In Spring of 2014, the band released their first EP, "Grundlos".

Their song "Am Ende" was included in one of the official soundtracks of FIFA 14.

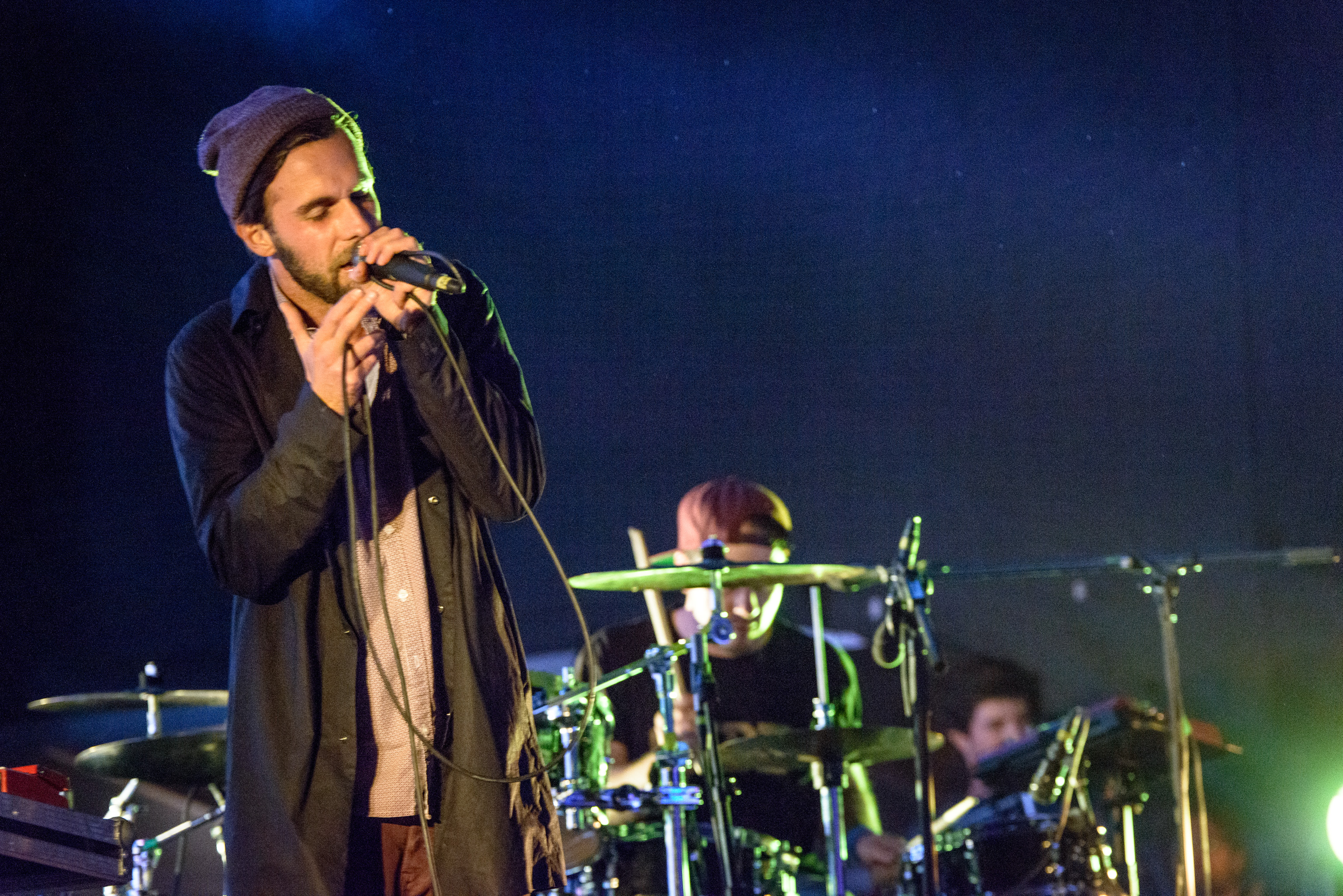
Jonas Schubert

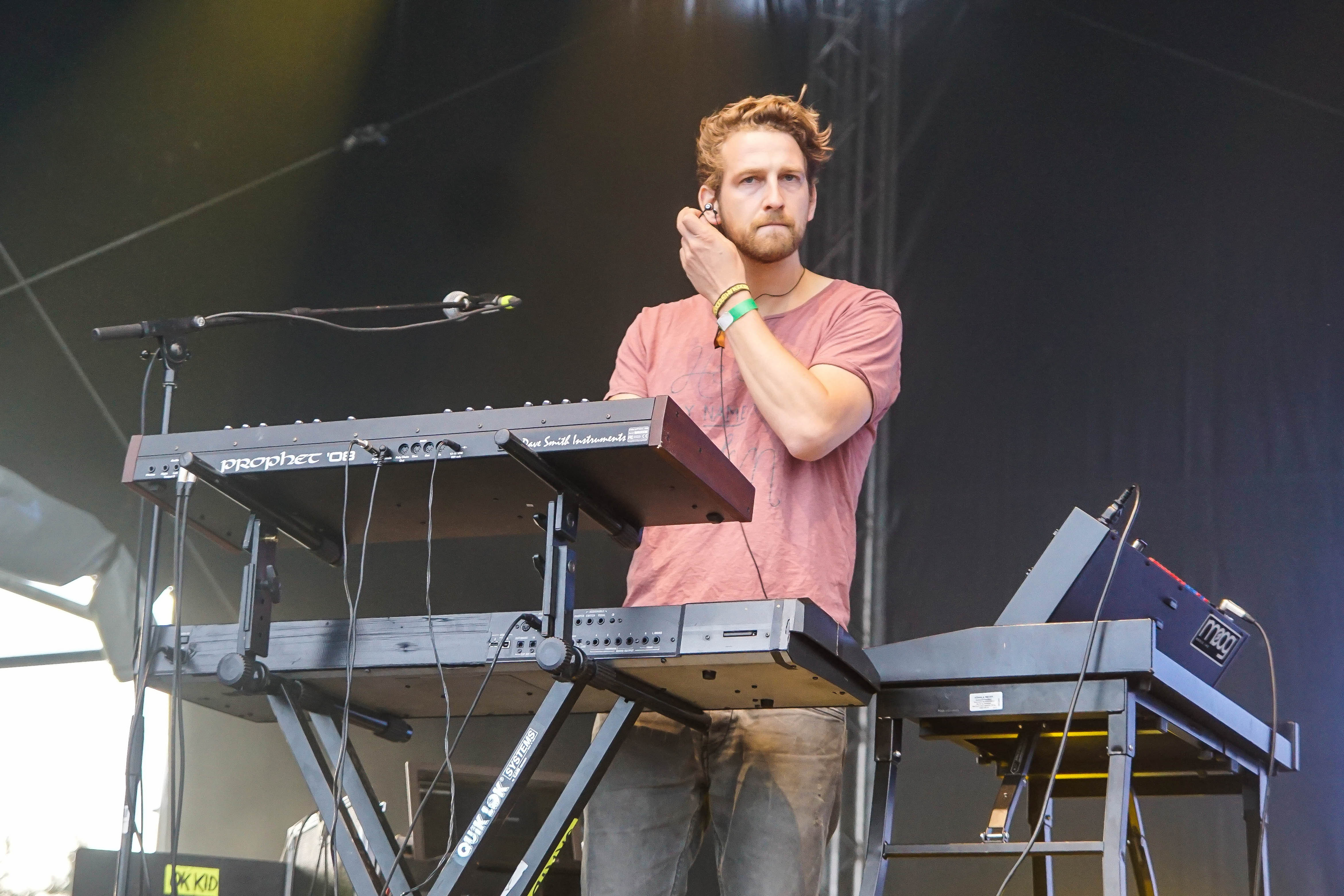
Moritz Rech

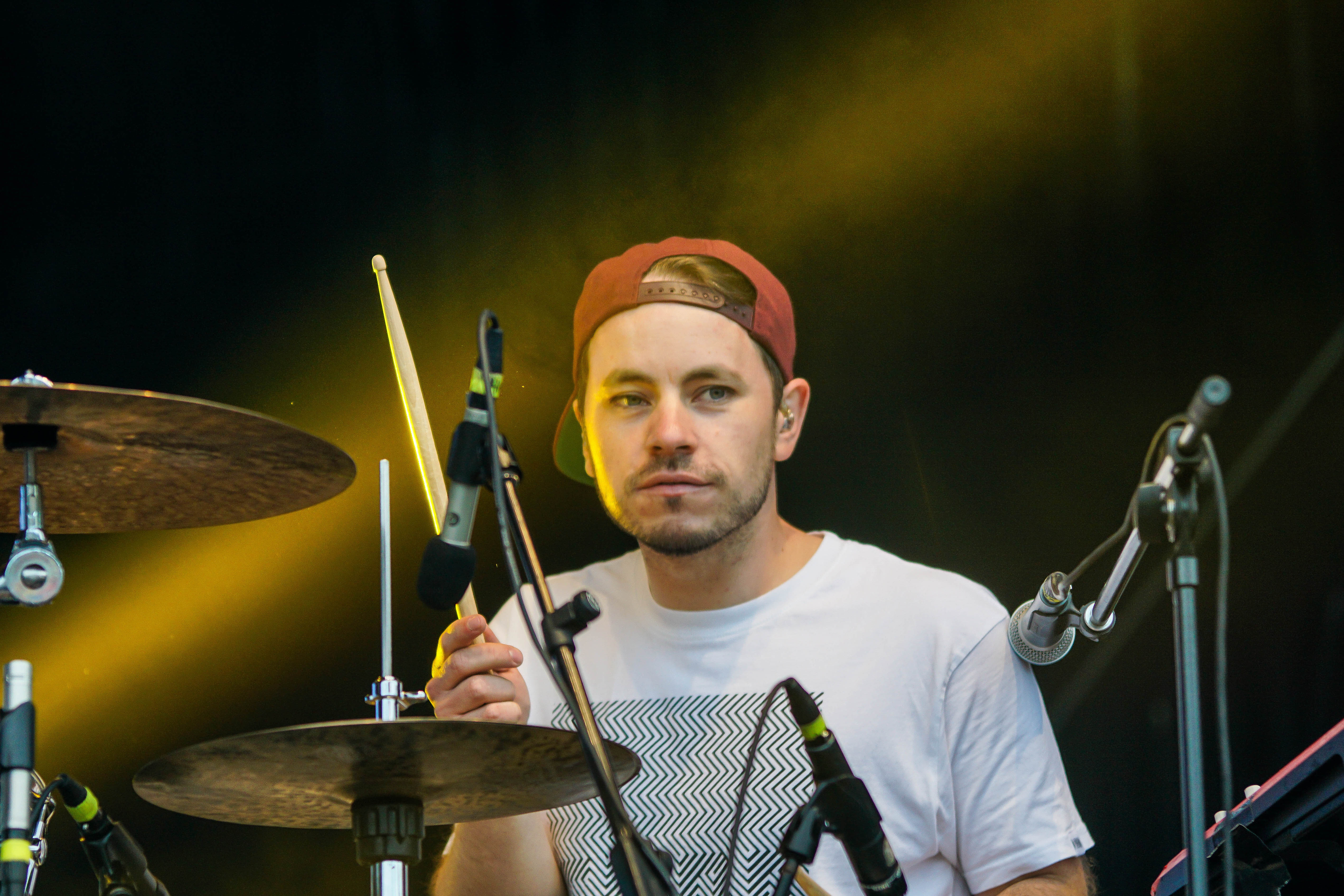
Raffael "Raffi" Kühle

== Discography ==
=== Albums ===
- 2013: OK Kid (Four Music Productions)
- 2016: Zwei (Four Music)
- 2018: Sensation (Four Music)
- 2019: Woodkids (Four Music)
- 2022: Drei (Four Music)

=== Singles ===
- 2013: Kaffee warm (Four Music)
- 2013: Stadt ohne Meer (Four Music)
- 2014: Unterwasserliebe (Four Music)
- 2015: Gute Menschen (Four Music)
- 2016: Bombay Calling (Four Music)
- 2016: Ich kann alles (Four Music)
- 2016: Es ist wieder Februar (Four Music)
- 2017: Warten auf den starken Mann (Four Music)
- 2018: Wut lass nach (Four Music)

=== EPs ===
- 2014: Grundlos (Four Music)
