= Madsen (band) =

German rock band

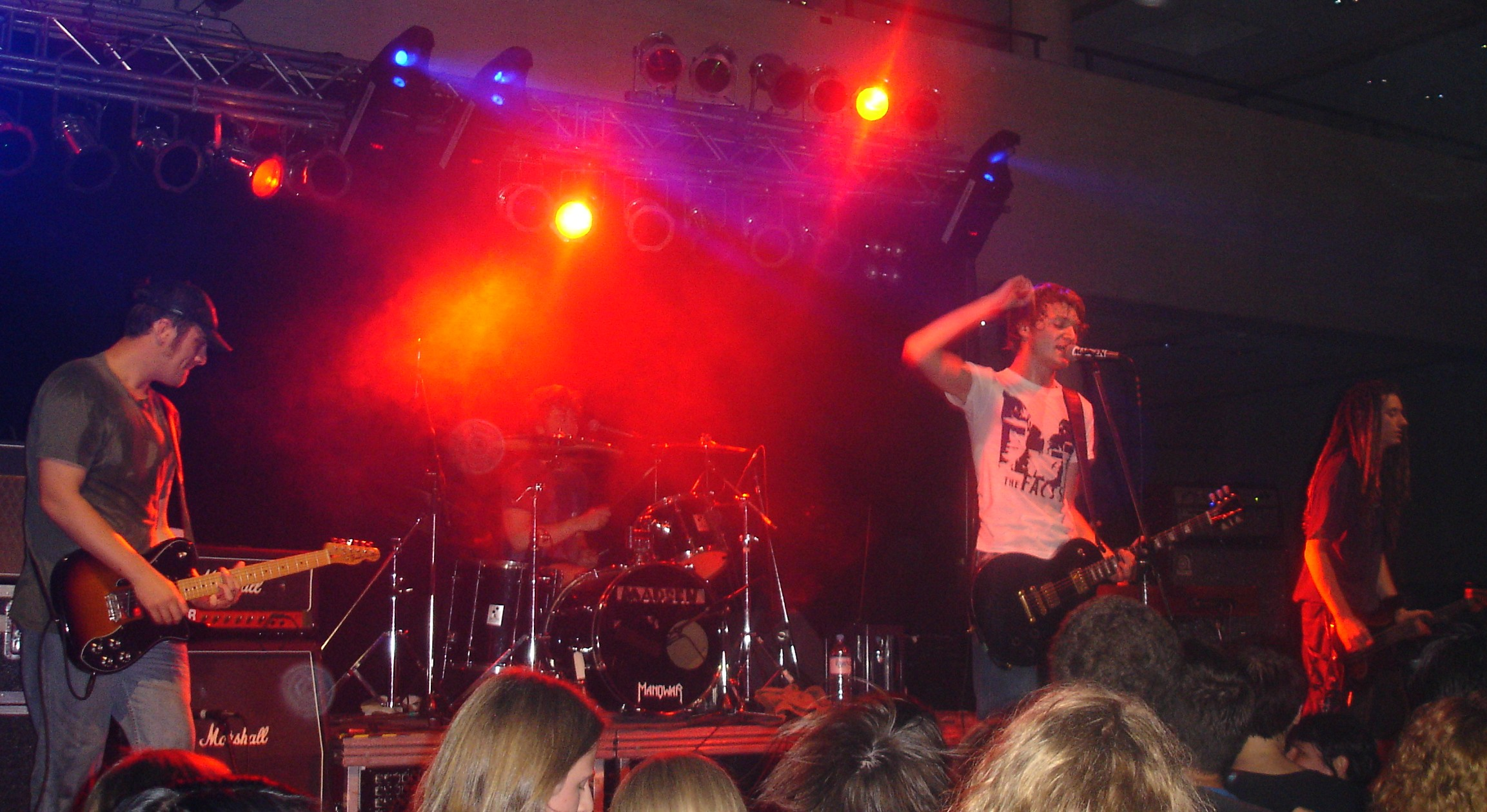
- Madsen performing at Campus Live Open Air in 2005

Background information
- Origin: Priesseck, Germany
- Genres: Alternative rock, indie rock, punk rock, pop punk
- Years active: 2004–present
- Labels: Universal; Arising Empire
- Members: Sebastian Madsen; Johannes Madsen; Sascha Madsen; Niko Maurer
- Past members: Folkert Jahnke
- Website: madsenmusik.de

Madsen is a German rock band that hails from Priesseck, a section of Clenze in the Wendland. Three of the members are brothers with the surname Madsen, hence the band's name.

Their music combines elements of pop, rock, indie and punk together with lyrics in German. They released their self-titled debut album in 2005 and reached No. 23 on the German music charts. In 2006, they released their second album, Goodbye Logik. Frieden im Krieg was released in 2008 and Labyrinth in 2010.

== History ==
The Madsen brothers began playing music at an early age. Towards the end of the 1990s, they had already been in two bands: Alice's Gun and Hoerstuatz. One group based itself upon the hard rock genre, while the other experimented with hip hop music and crossover elements. In 2004, the band wanted to further develop their music and lyrics and choose to change their name to Madsen. They sent their demos to Universal Music, which listened and signed Madsen to a contract at the end of 2004.

The band played many local and regional shows and became local heroes of a sort in the Wendlands area. After playing before predominantly small audiences in 2004, the band – through publicity generated by Universal Music – received the opportunity to play before larger audiences. They have since performed in several open-air music festivals, and have made appearances on MTV and various radio stations. In April and June 2005, Madsen's first two singles appeared, and in May 2005 their self-titled debut album was released. The album peaked at No. 23 on the German Charts and No. 39 on the Austrian Charts.

In 2005, the band performed in many German music festivals, including: Rock im Park, Rock am Ring, Highfield, and Hurricane. In June 2006 Madsen performed at the Nova Rock music festival, which has boasted such performers as Audioslave, System of a Down, Green Day, Metallica, and Guns N' Roses.

Madsen spent much of late 2005 and early 2006 in the recording studio. In August 2006, they released their second album, Goodbye Logik, which reached No. 8 on German charts and No. 18 on the Austrian Charts.

In March 2008, the third album Frieden im Krieg (Peace in war) was released.

They performed at Nova Rock 2009, along with such acts as Metallica, Faith No More and Nine Inch Nails.

They played their first concert in the United States on 16 October 2011 as a part of the Goethe Institute's "Do Deutsch" project. They played their first stop in Boston, Massachusetts.

== Music ==
Madsen's music contains elements of punk and rock, and includes sequences ranging from quiet reflection to passionate displays of emotion. Many fans say the band's lyrics are insightful and well-developed, as they reflect a wide variety of themes and subjects —- including "you, me, the world, the sky, hell, heaven, and everything else." Madsen's upbeat songs and passionate vocals are said to be a major factor in their relative success in Germany.

Madsen's style of music reminds some of a former popular German group, Tocotronic, and many music critics see the band as a new hope for the German music market.

== Political views ==
While the band has not taken any specific positions on political issues, they are known for their anti-racist views. The band members can be seen wearing anti-fascist T-shirts with slogans such as "Nazis Raus" ("Nazis out"). They also starred in the DVD film "Kein Bock auf Nazis" ("No room for Nazis") along with other prominent German bands such as Die Ärzte, ZSK, Beatsteaks and Wir sind Helden.

== Members ==
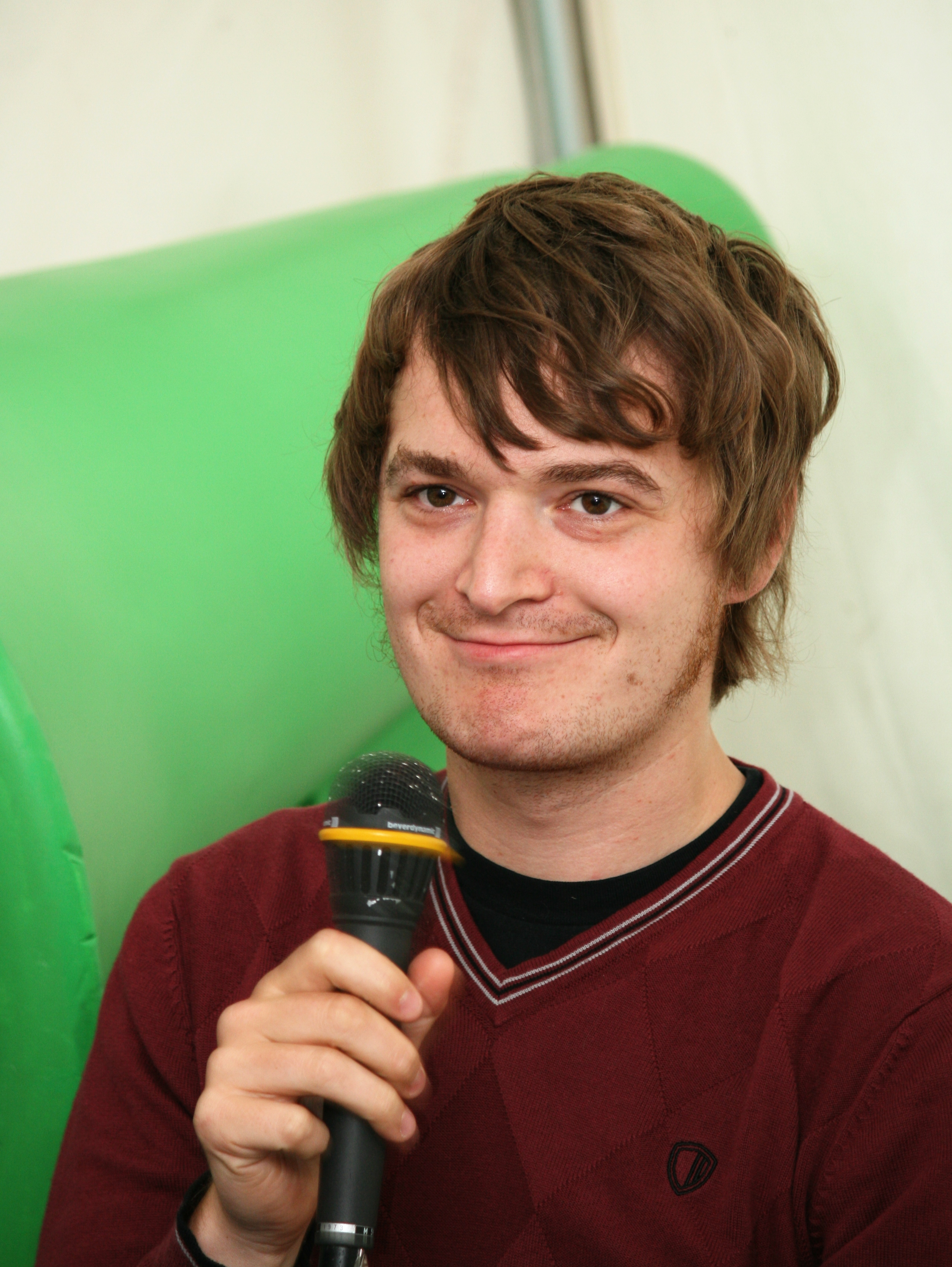
Sebastian Madsen: vocals and guitar

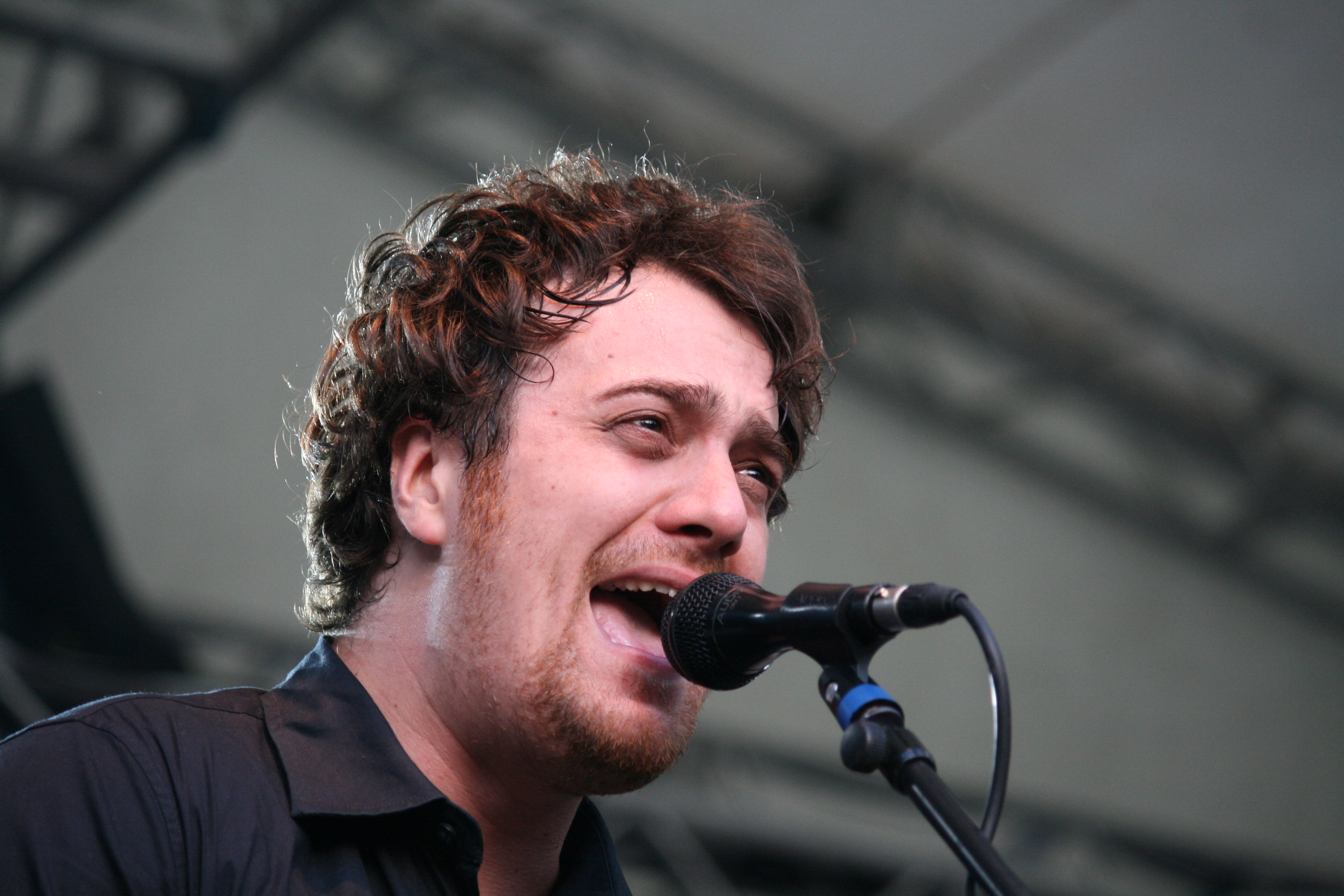
Johannes Madsen: guitar

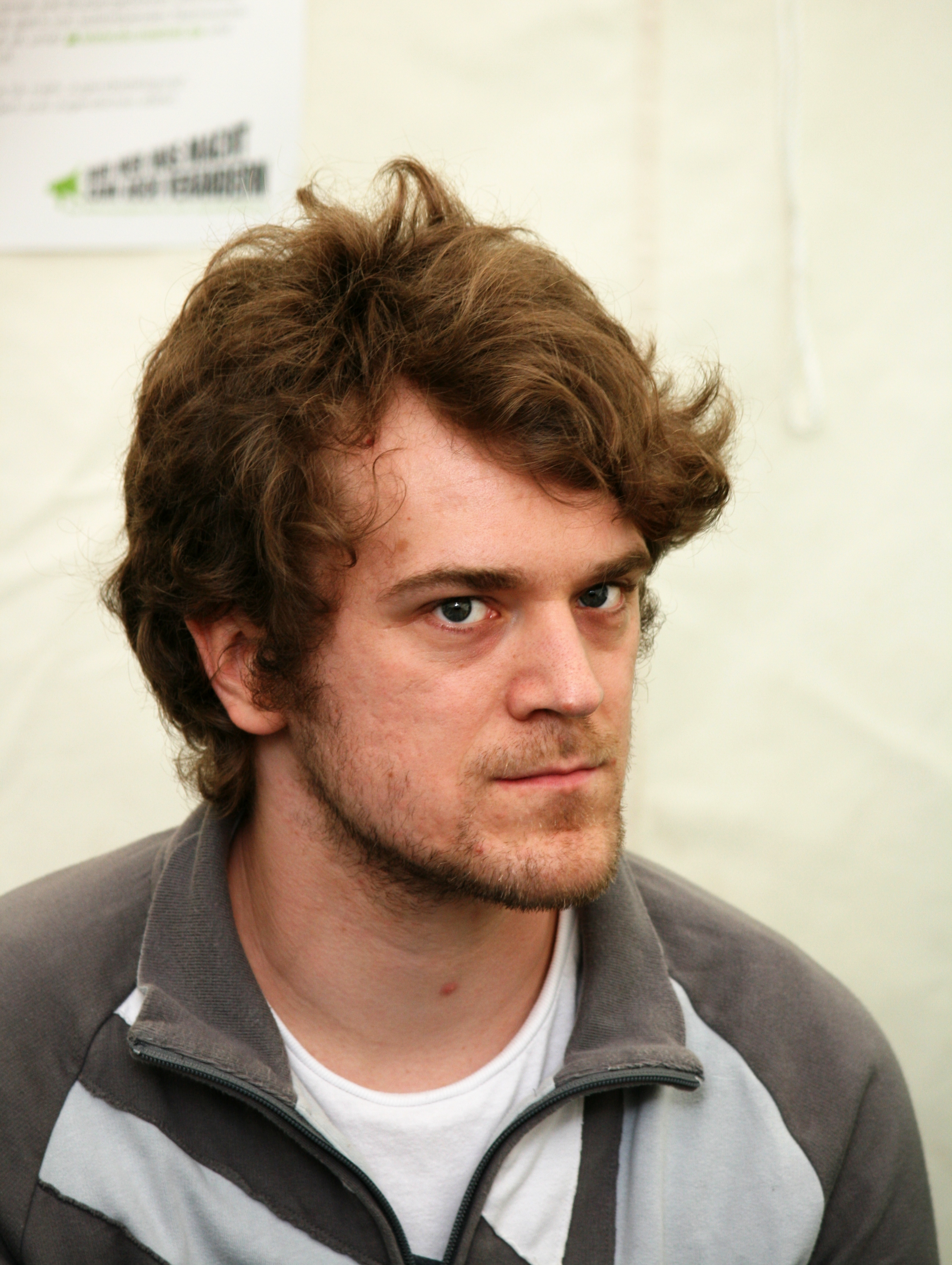
Sascha Madsen: percussion

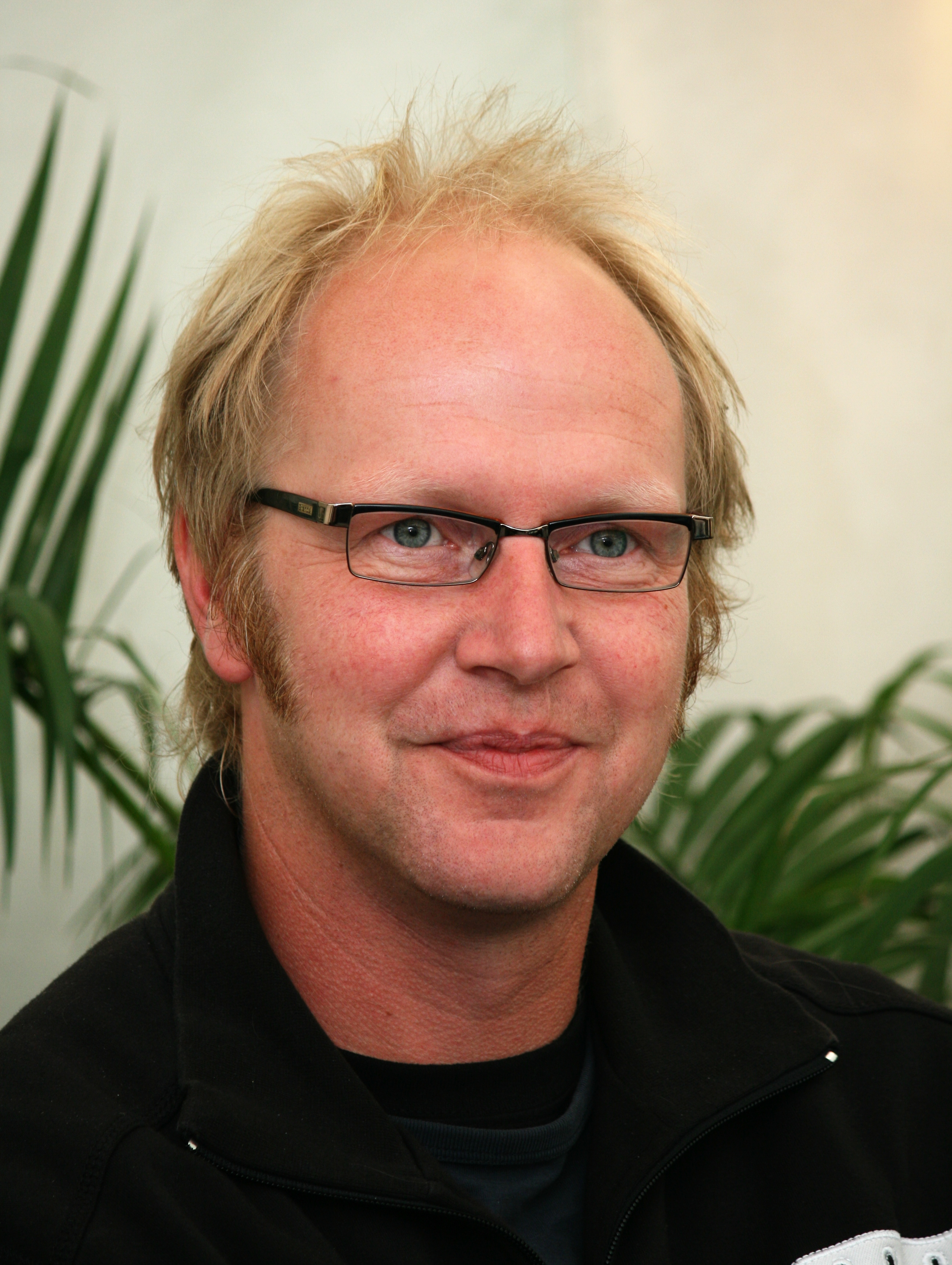
Folkert Jahnke: keyboards

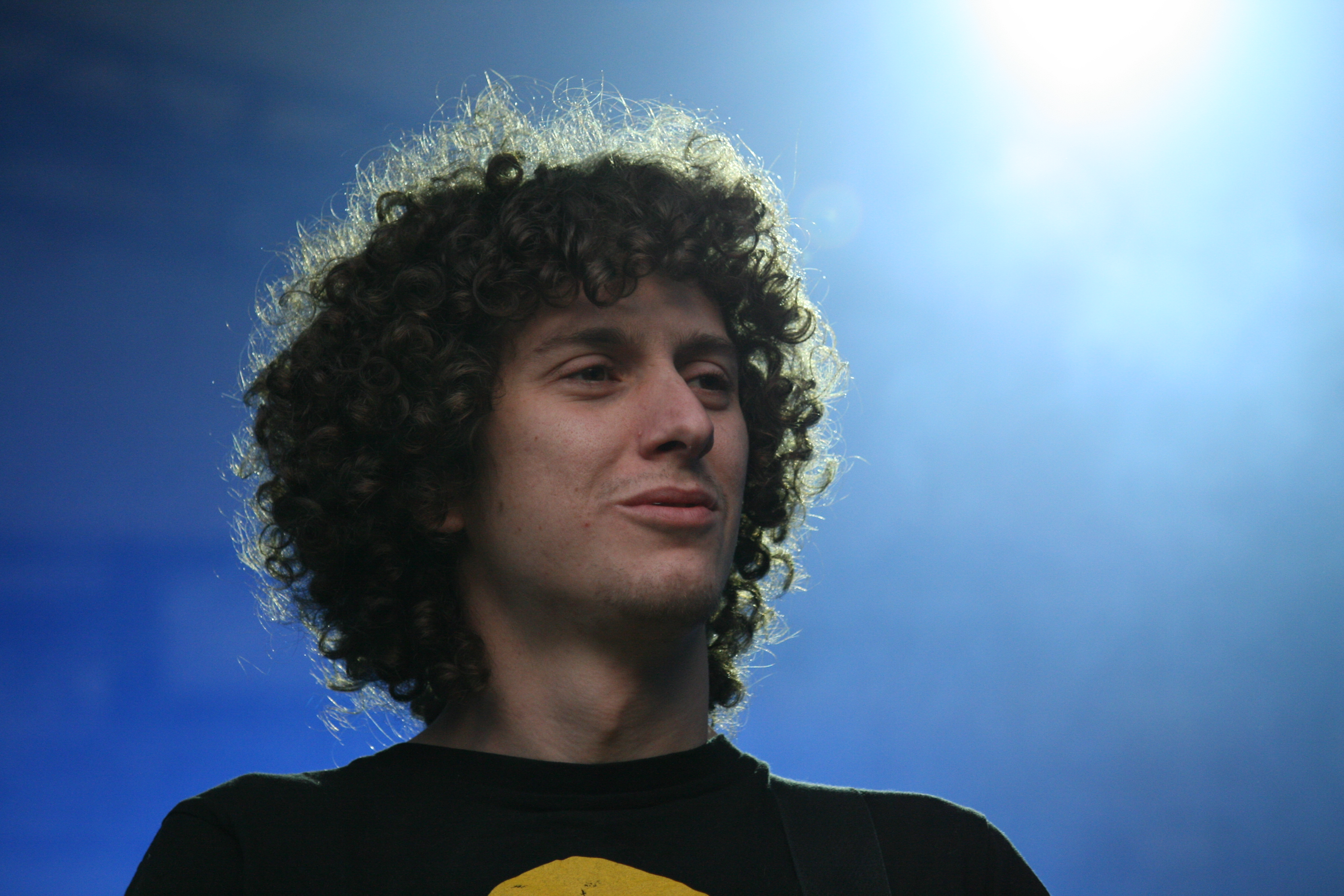
Niko Maurer: bass guitar

== Discography ==
- Madsen (2005)
- Goodbye Logik (2006)
- Frieden im Krieg (2008)
- Labyrinth (2010)
- Wo es beginnt (2012)
- Kompass (2015)
- Lichtjahre (2018)
- Na Gut Dann Nicht (2020)
- Hollywood (2023)
- Die Weihnachtsplatte (2024)
- SMILE (2026)
