= Little May =

Australian folk band

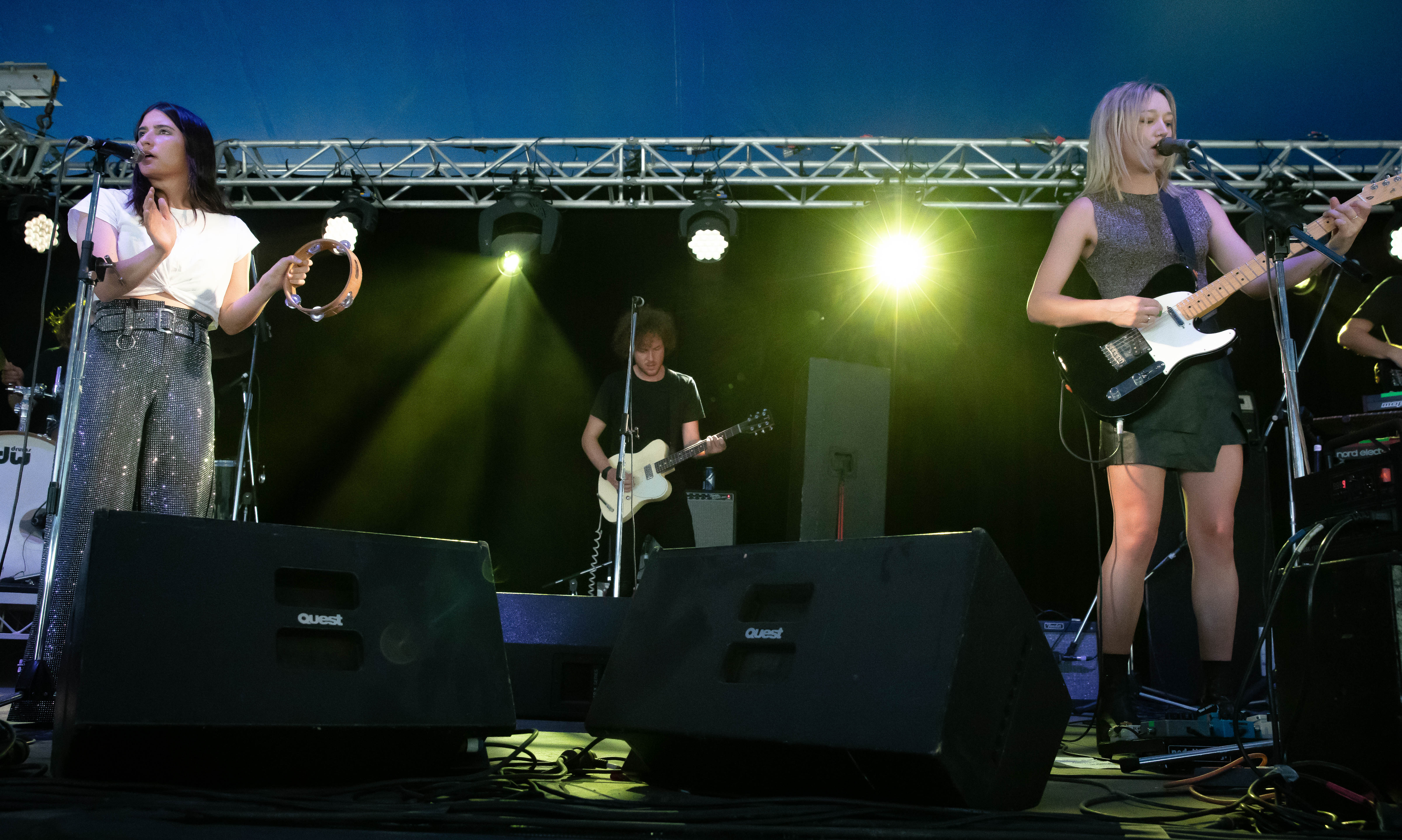

Background information
- Origin: Sydney, Australia
- Genres: Folk; indiepop
- Years active: 2012–2019
- Labels: Dew Process, Universal Music Group
- Past members: Liz Drummond; Hannah Field; Annie Hamilton

Little May were an Australian folk band. Little May was founded in 2012 in Sydney by singer Hannah Field with guitarists Liz Drummond and Annie Hamilton.

The band has taken inspiration from music by The National and alt-J. After various performances in the Sydney area, the band released a self-titled EP in 2014, which they had been working on for two years. In 2015, the duo worked on their debut album in New York City. The album was produced by Aaron Dessner of The National. To support the release of the album, the band went on an extensive tour through Europe, aided by bass keyboard player Mark Harding and drummer Cat Hunter. On 20 June 2015, the band performed in Netherlands on Best Kept Secret in Hilvarenbeek. On 9 October 2015 the album "For the company" was released. Dessner, who appeared on the album on various instruments, was credited on three tracks as a co-writer. A week after the release of the album the band played in Paradiso Amsterdam.

On May 3, 2019, Little May released "Blame My Body," on the Dew Process label, to generally positive reviews with critics citing the new direction as a duo as a positive development. Later that year, Little May announced on Instagram that they had disbanded.

== Members ==
=== Principal members ===
- Hannah Field – vocals (2012–2019)
- Liz Drummond – guitar and vocals (2012–2019)
- Annie Hamilton – guitar and vocals (2012–2018)

=== Live members ===
- Mark Harding – bass guitar and keyboard
- Cat Hunter – drums and percussion

== Discography ==
=== Albums ===
List of albums
Title	Details
For the Company	Released: 2015; Label: Dew Process (DEW9000797); Formats: CD, LP, digital
Blame My Body	Released: 2018; Label: Dew Process (DEW9001131); Formats: CD, LP, digital

=== Extended Plays ===
List of EPs
Title	Details
Little May	Released: 2014; Label: Dew Process (DEW9000712); Formats: CD, LP, digital

=== Certified songs ===
List of charted songs, with certifications
Title	Year	Chart positions	Certifications	Album
Title	Year	AUS	Certifications	Album
"Boardwalks"	2015	—	ARIA: Gold	For the Company
