= Von Wegen Lisbeth =

German indie-pop band

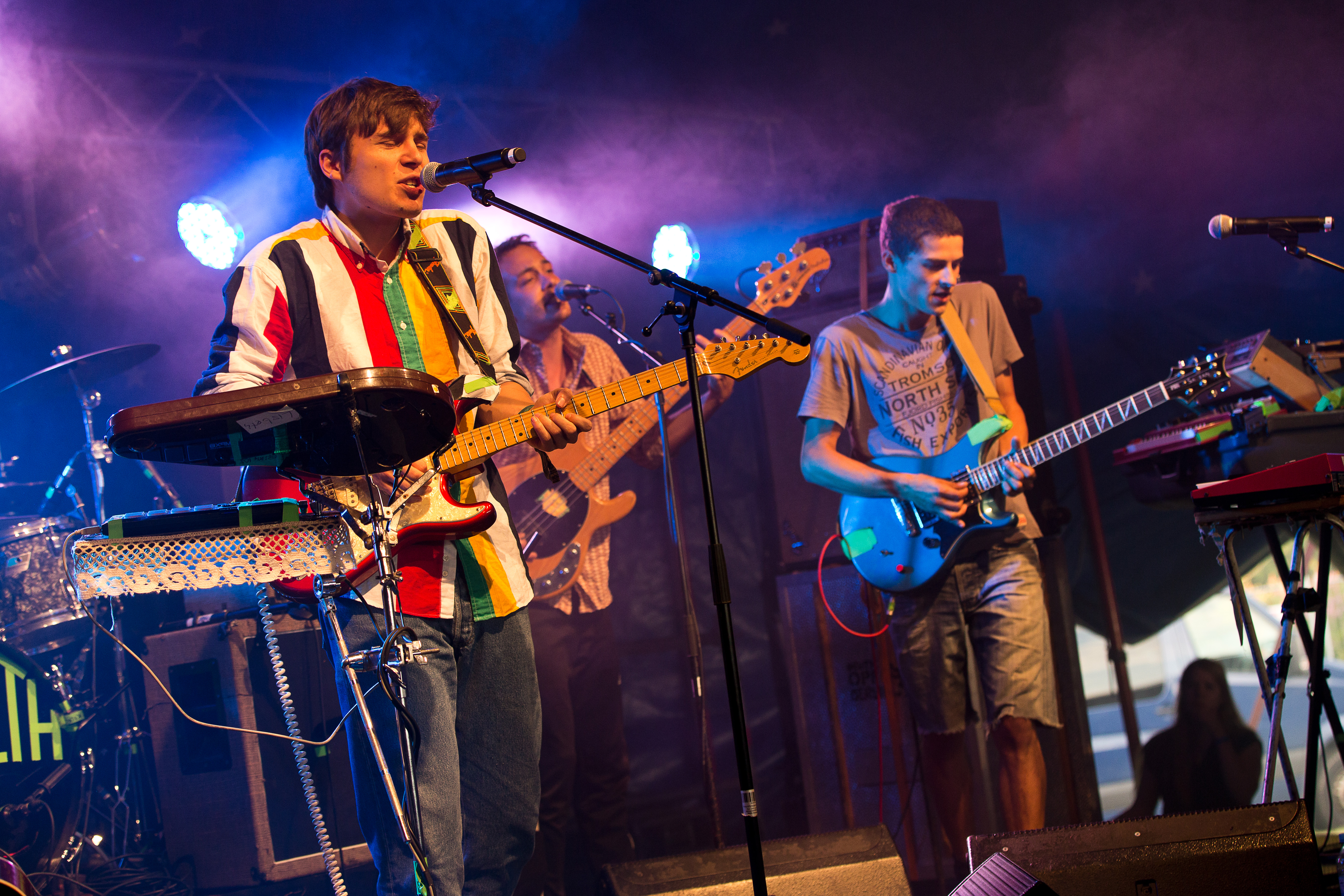
- Von Wegen Lisbeth at Rocken am Brocken, 2016

Background information
- Origin: Berlin, Germany
- Genres: Indie pop, indie rock
- Years active: 2006–present
- Members: Julian Hölting (E-bass); Matthias Rohde (singer, guitar); Robert Tischer (synthesizer, percussion); Dominik "Doz" Zschäbitz (guitar); Julian Zschäbitz (drums)
- Website: vonwegenlisbeth.de

Von Wegen Lisbeth (English: "Because of Lisbeth" or "As if, Lisbeth!") (German pronunciation: [ˈfɔn veːgən̩ liːzbɛt]) is a German indie-pop band from Berlin that was founded in 2006 under the name Fluchtweg. The group sings in German; a special feature is the use of unusual musical instruments such as a children's ɡlockenspiel.

== History ==
The band was founded when the members were in seventh grade at the Beethoven-Gymnasium in Berlin, after sports lessons were cancelled due to the teacher having called in sick. They have described their earlier musical style as "from hardcore punk to 8-bit Gameboy Casio music". After high school, all band members started studying subjects like architecture, film music, mathematics, electrical engineering and art. However, they took a break from university in order to focus on their first album and the associated tour.

In 2014, Von Wegen Lisbeth went on tour as the supporting act to AnnenMayKantereit, and in November they released their EP “Und plötzlich der Lachs”. This was followed by 18 more concerts with AnnenMayKantereit at the beginning of 2015, and their first tour as headliner called "Störung im Betriebsablauf" at the end of the year.

After they went on tour with Element of Crime and again AnnenMayKantereit in early 2016., they released their debut album Grande on July 15, 2016, which was followed by a tour in September and October of the same year. They also played at several music festivals in 2016, such as the Appletree Garden Festival, the Kosmonaut Festival, Rocken am Brocken and the Fusion Festival. In 2018, they performed at the Campus Festival in Bielefeld as well as at the Deichbrand in Nordholz.

In 2019, the band released their second album sweetlilly93@hotmail.com. In the summer of 2019, they performed at numerous festivals like the Open Air Werden, the Taubertal-Festival and others. That same year, they also toured Germany, Austria and Switzerland with their “Britz-California”-tour, their fourth tour as headliners

== Style ==
Their song lyrics are mainly written by the band’s singer Matthias Rohde, who integrates everyday situations and conversations into his songs.

“These are all everyday experiences that you unconsciously pick up. The basic ideas are usually autobiographical, but when developing the lyrics, I add a lot of stuff.”

Characteristic for their musical style are instruments such as an electronic Casio-Keyboard or a steel drum, which the band has partly borrowed or bought from an opera house.

Von Wegen Lisbeth, Live

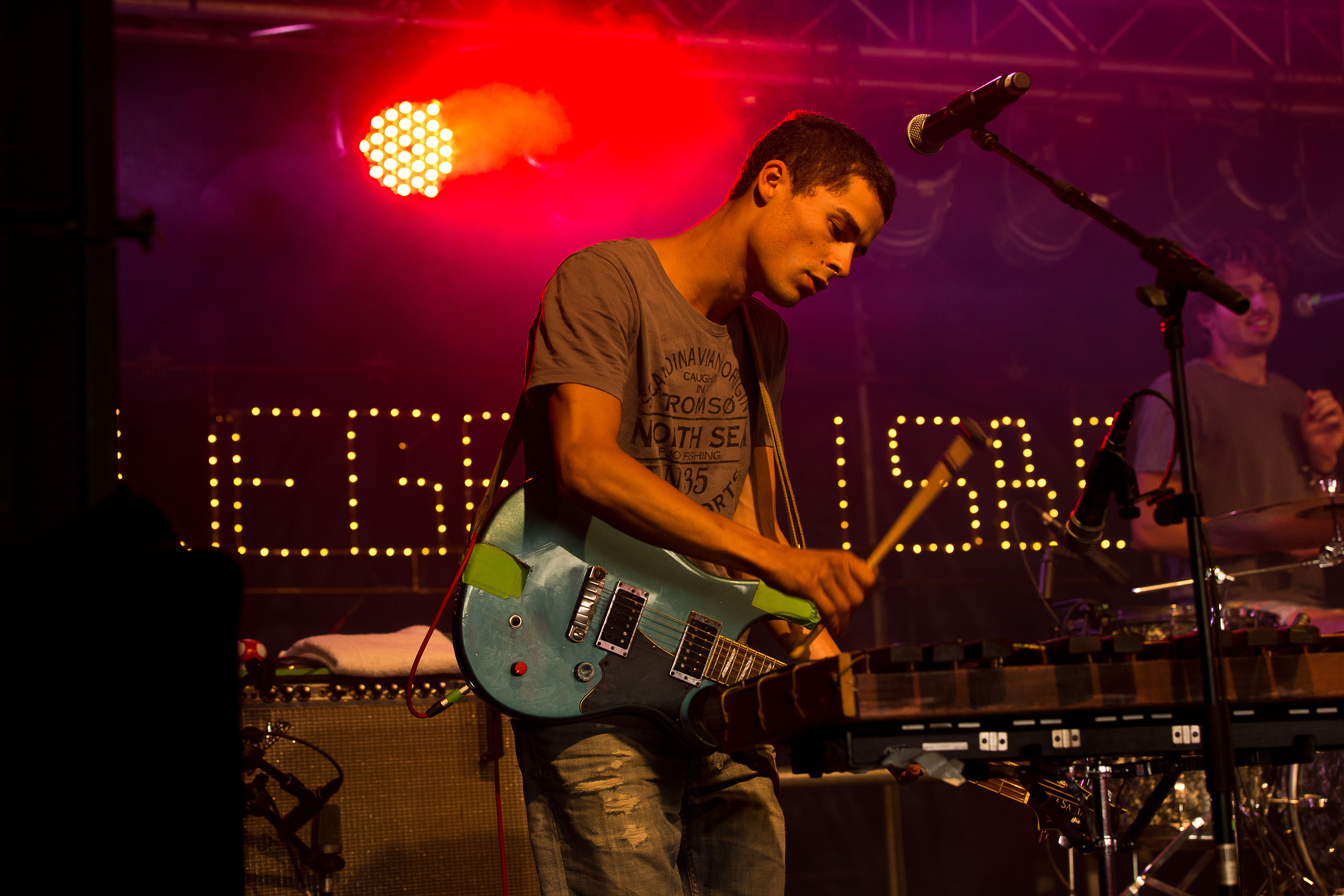
Doz Zschäbitz

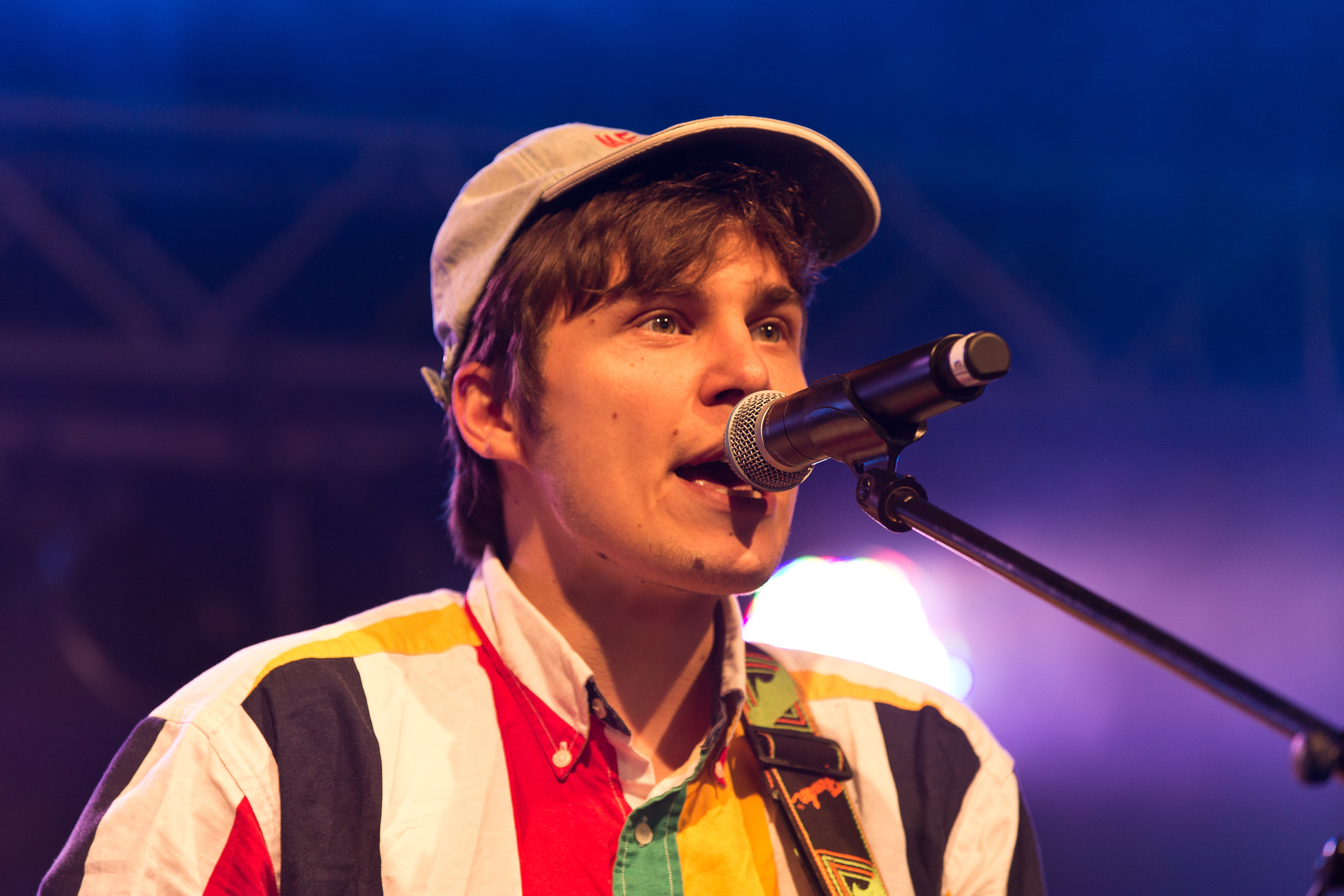
Matthias Rohde

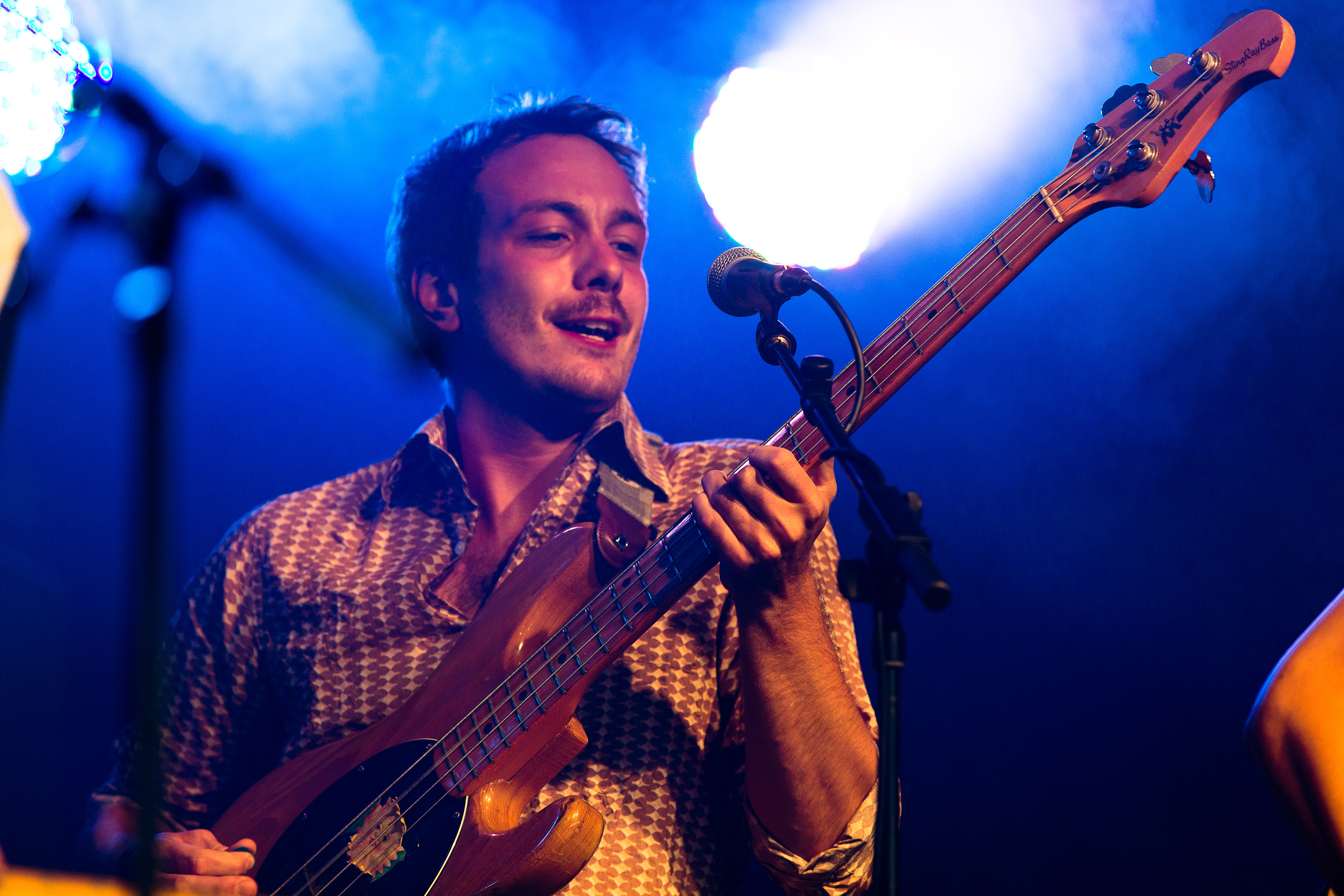
Julian Hölting

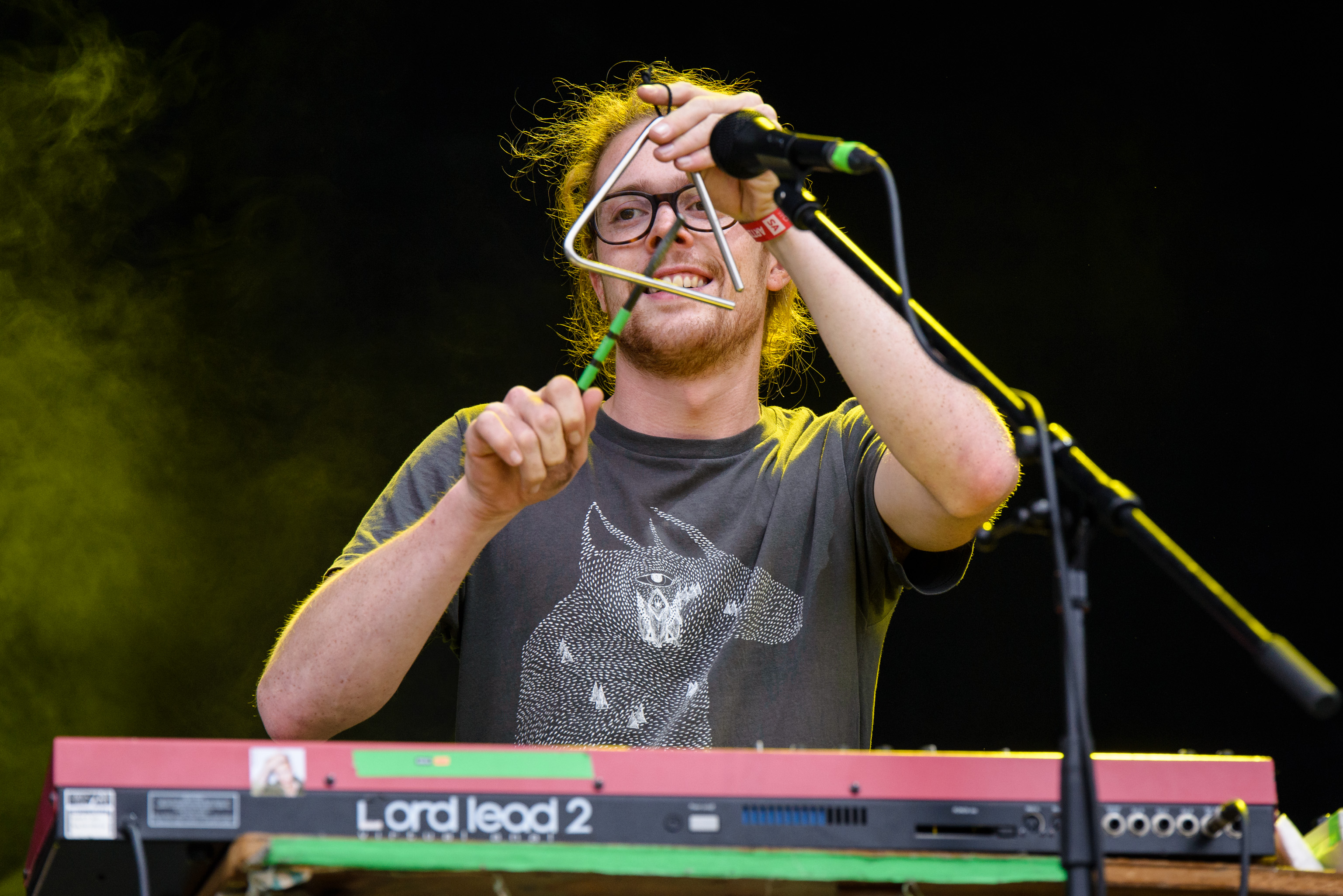
Robert Tischer

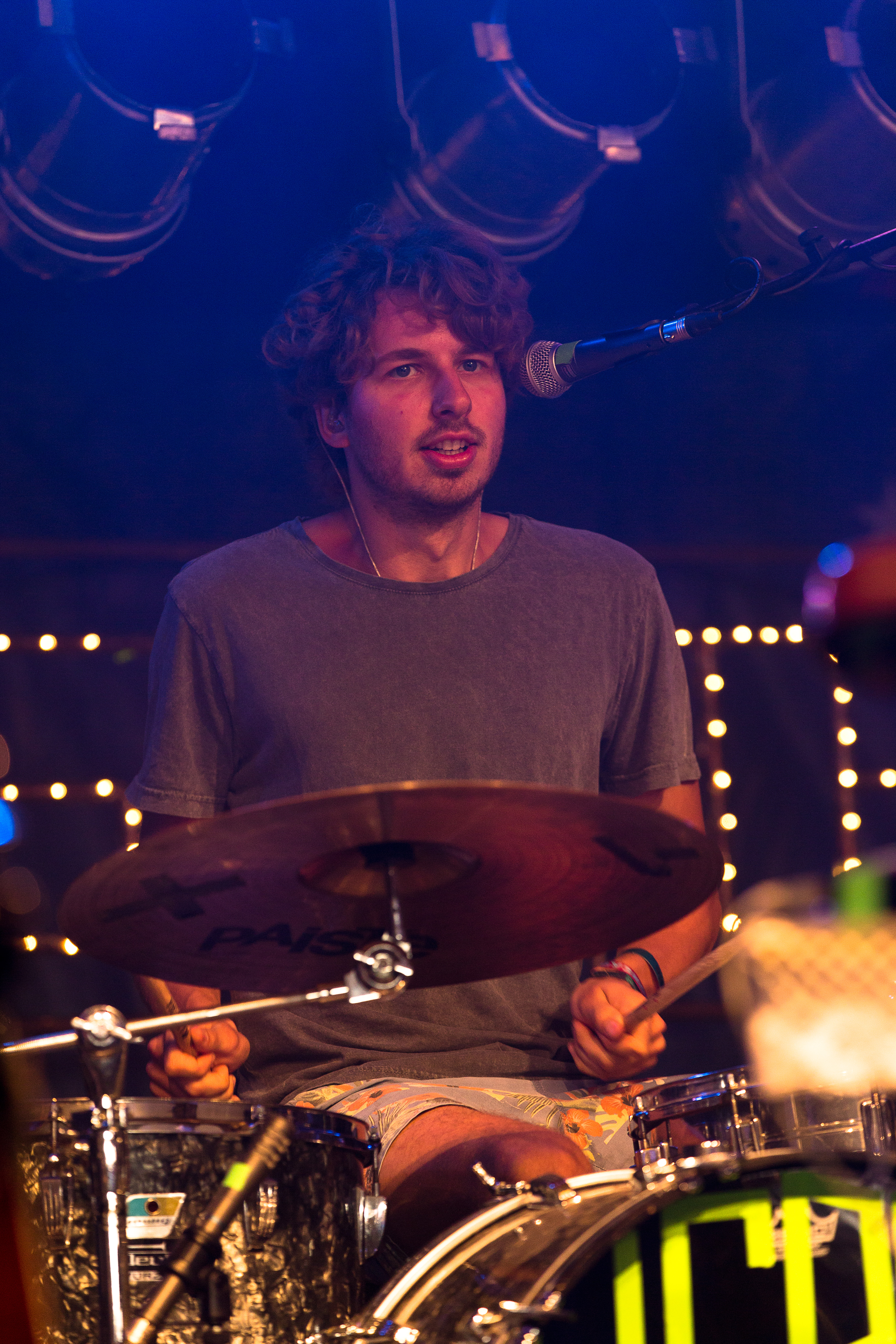
Julian Zschäbitz

== Discography ==
=== Studio albums ===
Year	Title record label	Chart Position			Comments
Year	Title record label	DE	AT	CH	Comments
2016	Grande Sony Music	25 (3 weeks)	—	—	Released: July 15, 2016
2019	sweetlilly93@hotmail.com Columbia	14 (5 weeks)	19 (2 weeks)	30 (1 week)	Released: May 3, 2019
2022	EZ Aquarii Columbia	11 (2 weeks)	40 (1 week)	96 (1 week)	Released: September 23, 2022
2025	Strandbad Eldena Columbia	26 (1 week)	—	—	Released: December 12, 2025

=== Live albums ===
Year	Title record label	Chartposition			Comments
Year	Title record label	DE	AT	CH	Comments
2020	Von Wegen Lisbeth - Live in der Columbiahalle Columbia	24 (1 week)	—	—	Released: May 22, 2020

=== EPs ===
- 2012: Promo 2012 (first publication: November 20, 2012)
- 2014: Und plötzlich der Lachs (And Suddenly the Salmon) (Chateau Lala, first publication: November 1, 2014)

== Awards ==
- 2017: Deutscher Musikautorenpreis (German Music Authors' Prize): Young Talent Award
- 2017: ECHO – Best Video National, Single Bitch
