= Swiss und die Andern =

German Punkrock-band

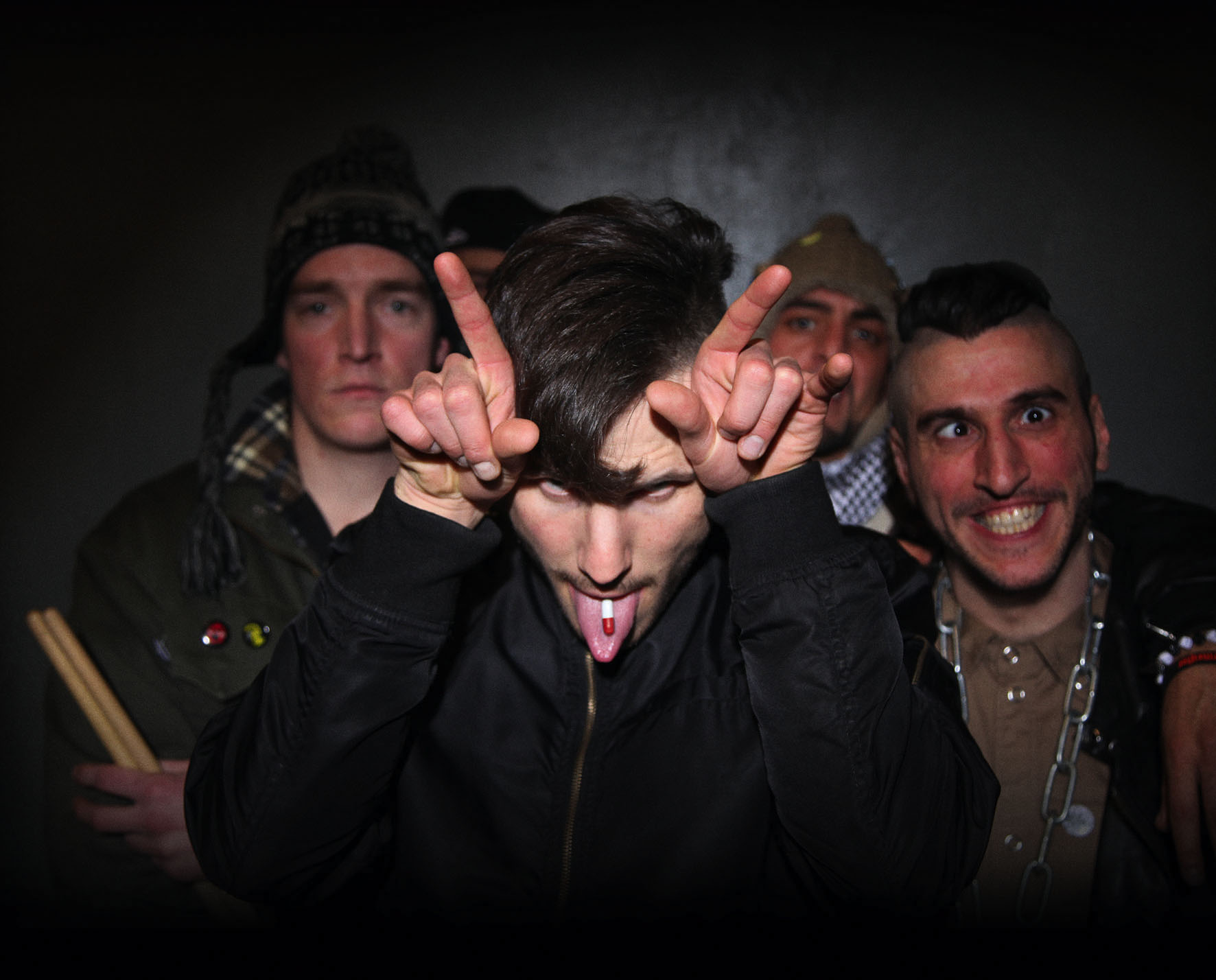
- Swiss und die Andern

Background information
- Origin: Hamburg, Germany
- Members: Swiss (vocals); Jakob Schulze (guitar); Matze Grimm (base guitar); Da Wizard (DJ); Tobias Gerth (drums)
- Past members: Shocky (background vocals)
- Website: https://missglueckte-welt.de/

Swiss und die Andern (English: Swiss and the others), also stylized as Swiss + die Andern, are a German Punkrock-band from Hamburg that also uses a lot of crossover elements. The band consists of frontman Swiss, Jakob Schulze on the guitar, Matze Grimm on the base guitar, drummer Tobias Gerth and DJ Da Wizard. Their style is heavily influenced by political topics.

== History ==
In September 2014, the band officially released their first EP Schwarz Rot Braun via their own label Missglückte Welt. It was distributed by Soulfood. Following the release, Swiss und die Andern performed three live shows for fans and journalists aboard a boat in the port of Hamburg. In fall 2014, the band went on tour through Germany, Austria and Switzerland together with J.B.O. After that they had several appearances on the German TV programme ARD as well as performances on multiple festivals.

In January 2015 the band released their first studio album Große Freiheit (Great Freedom), which ranked 44th in the German album charts. In 2016, the second album Missglückte Welt (Failed World) appeared. After the EP Wir gegen die (We against them) the third studio album Randalieren für die Liebe (riot / rampage for love) was released in 2018. In 2020, the fourth album Saunaclub was released, followed by the fifth album Orphan in February 2021.

In 2023, the band released Erstmal zu Penny. which reached No. 1 on the album chart. Their compilation album 10 Jahre Swiss + Die Andern Best of released in 2024 received a silver award.

== Controversies ==
The band's fans (who call themselves Zecken (ticks), a German slang word for left-wing extremists) are organised in so-called Sippschaften. In exchange for promoting the band, these fans get early access to tickets and merchandise, additionally they are allowed to enter concerts, while soundchecks are still carried out. In 2022, the newspaper Main-Post reported, that the band had been heavily criticized on social media. The band would undermine the anticapitalistic tendencies inherent in the punk community by selling expensive merchandise and promoting sect-like structures in the Sippschaften.

== Discography ==
=== Albums ===
Title	Details	Peak chart positions
Title	Details	GER
Große Freiheit	Released: 9 January 2015; Label: Missglückte Welt / Soulfood	44
Missglückte Welt	Released: 1 April 2016; Label: Missglückte Welt / Soulfood	28
Randalieren für die Liebe	Released: 24 August 2018; Label: Missglückte Welt / Soulfood	2
Saunaclub	Released: 1 May 2020; Label: Missglückte Welt / Soulfood	4
Orphan	Released: 5 February 2021; Label: Missglückte Welt / Soulfood	2
Erstmal zu Penny	Released: 19 May 2023; Label: Missglückte Welt / Columbia	1
10 Jahre Swiss + Die Andern Best of	Released: 16 August 2024; Label: Missglückte Welt / Soulfood	2
Punk ist tot	Released: 5 September 2025; Label: Missglückte Welt / Soulfood	2

=== EPs ===
Title	Details	Peak chart positions
Title	Details	GER
Schwarz Rot Braun	Released: 19 September 2014; Label: Missglückte Welt	—
Radikal EP	Released: 2015; Label: Missglückte Welt	—
Wir gegen Die	Released: 5 May 2017; Label: Missglückte Welt	—
Kill your Darlings	Released: 23 August 2018; Label: Missglückte Welt	—
Herz auf St. Pauli	Released: 2020; Label: Missglückte Welt	—
Keine Gewalt ist auch keine Lösung	Released: 2022; Label: Missglückte Welt / Columbia	50
