= Left Boy =

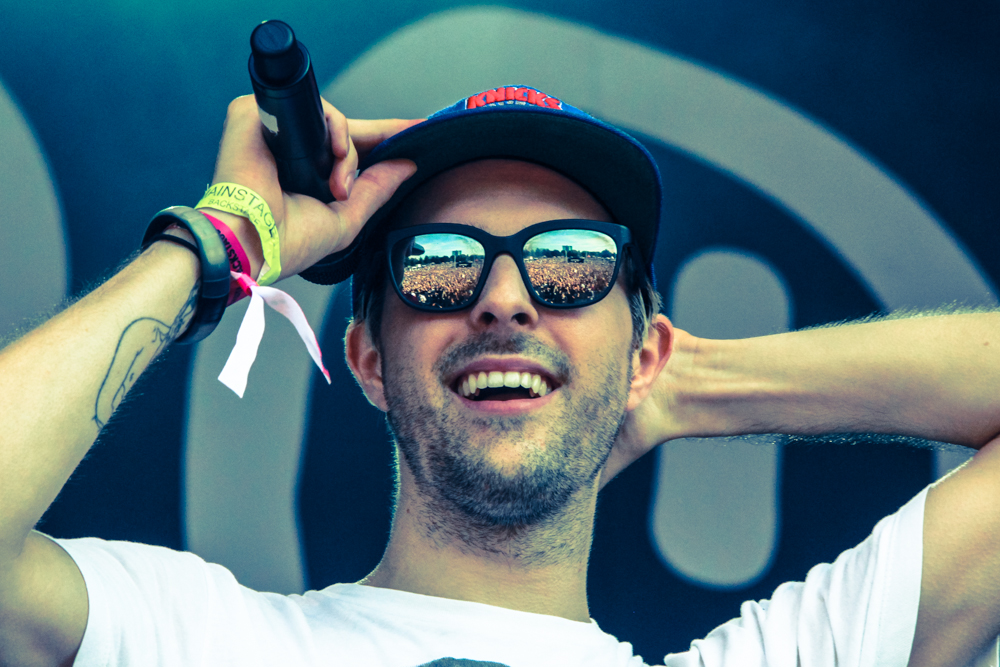
- Left Boy (2013)

Background information
- Born: Ferdinand Sarnitz; 17 December 1988 (age 37); Vienna, Austria
- Genres: Rap, future pop, electro, dubstep, drum and bass
- Occupations: Rapper, singer, producer
- Years active: 2010–present
- Labels: Warner; JIVE Germany
- Website: www.ferdi.site

Ferdinand Sarnitz, (born 17 December 1988) known by his stage name Ferdinand fka Left Boy, is an Austrian singer and producer from Vienna, Austria.

== Biography ==
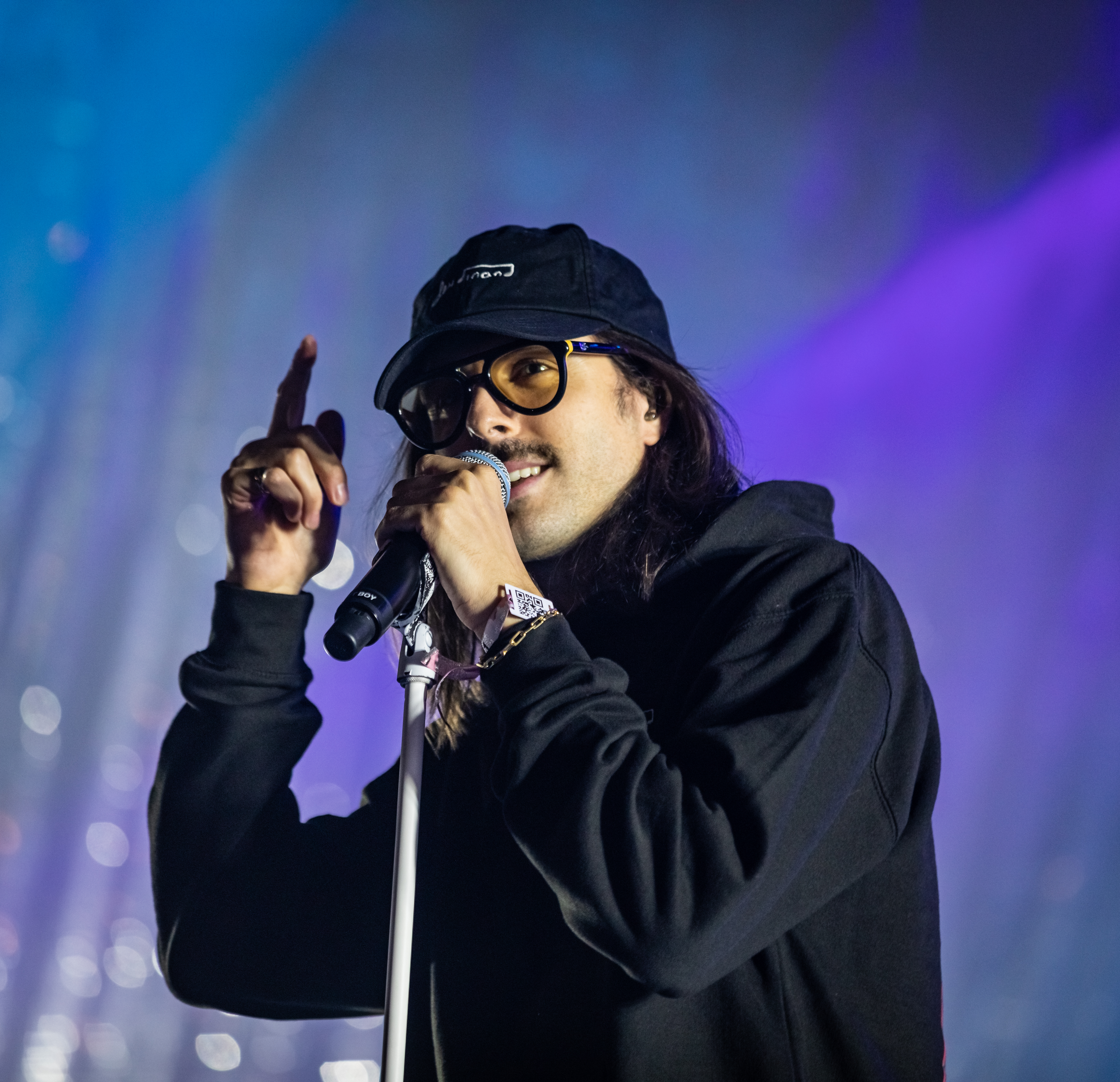
Left Boy live at Rock am Ring 2019

Sarnitz was born on 17 December 1988 in Vienna, Austria to Austrian musician André Heller and Sabina Sarnitz. He attended the American International School of Vienna and graduated in 2007. Sarnitz spent much of his free time at school rapping. At the age of 18, Sarnitz went to New York City to study audio engineering at the Institute of Audio Research for a year. After living in his hometown Vienna for a short while, he moved to Brooklyn to live in a shared apartment with two directors, a producer and a photographer.

In December 2010, Sarnitz released his first mixtape, The Second Coming, for free download. In mid-2011, he started making music videos for all of the songs. Sarnitz often uses samples for his English songs which haven't been released for usability which is why an official sound carrier couldn't be released. Even though he hadn't been signed to a record label, he was able to perform at festivals in 2012, including Sea of Love and HipHop Open. Live, he is accompanied by the dance group Urban Movement. Sarnitz has a son called Yves-Louis. He cites Wu-Tang Clan, Oxmo Puccino, De La Soul, Atmosphere, Ugly Duckling, Daft Punk, Édith Piaf, Nina Simone, Oumou Sangaré, and Gipsy Kings as his inspirations.

In 2015, he rapped in the Official Theme Tune for the Eurovision Song Contest 2015 "Building Bridges".

== Discography ==
=== Album ===
Title	Details
Permanent Midnight	Released: 14 February 2014; Label: Self-released; Formats: Digital download, Audio CD
Ferdinand	Released: 6 April 2018; Label: Self-released; Formats: Digital download, Audio CD

=== Mixtapes ===
Title	Details
The Second Coming	Released: 2010; Label: Self-released; Formats: Digital download
Eternal Sunshine	Released: 2013; Label: Self-released; Formats: Digital download

=== EP ===
Title	Details
Guns, Bitches and Weed	Released: 2012; Label: Self-released; Formats: Digital download
NEW PAGE WHO DIS?	Released: 2019; Label: Made Jour Label; Formats: Digital download

=== Singles ===
Title	Year
"Jack Sparrow"	2011
"I Want To"	2011
"Gangstash"	2011
"Outro"	2011
"Video Games" (featuring Mirakle)	2011
"Survive" (featuring Océane)	2011
"Vie"	2011
"Call Me Maybe"	2012
"Hundred K"	2013
"Black Dress"	2013
"Girl"	2013
"Get It Right"	2013
"Security Check"	2014
"Sweet Emotions"	2015
"Healthy Ego"	2015
"Dangerous"	2016
"The Return Of..."	2017
"Get High"	2017
"Father of God"	2018
"Sweet Goodbye"	2018
"Kid"	2018
"Bitte brich mein Herz nicht Baby..."	2018
"Sex Party"	2019
"Dynamite"	2019
"Stay at Home to Save the World"	2020
"Every Single Summer"	2020
"Money Right"	2020
"Vampire"	2020
"Das ist Liebe"	2021
"Ohne Dir"	2022
"Summer Love"	2022
"Sweet Dreams (Sky Like Dreams)"	2023
"TECHNO BABY"	2025
