= De fofftig Penns =

German hip-hop and electro band

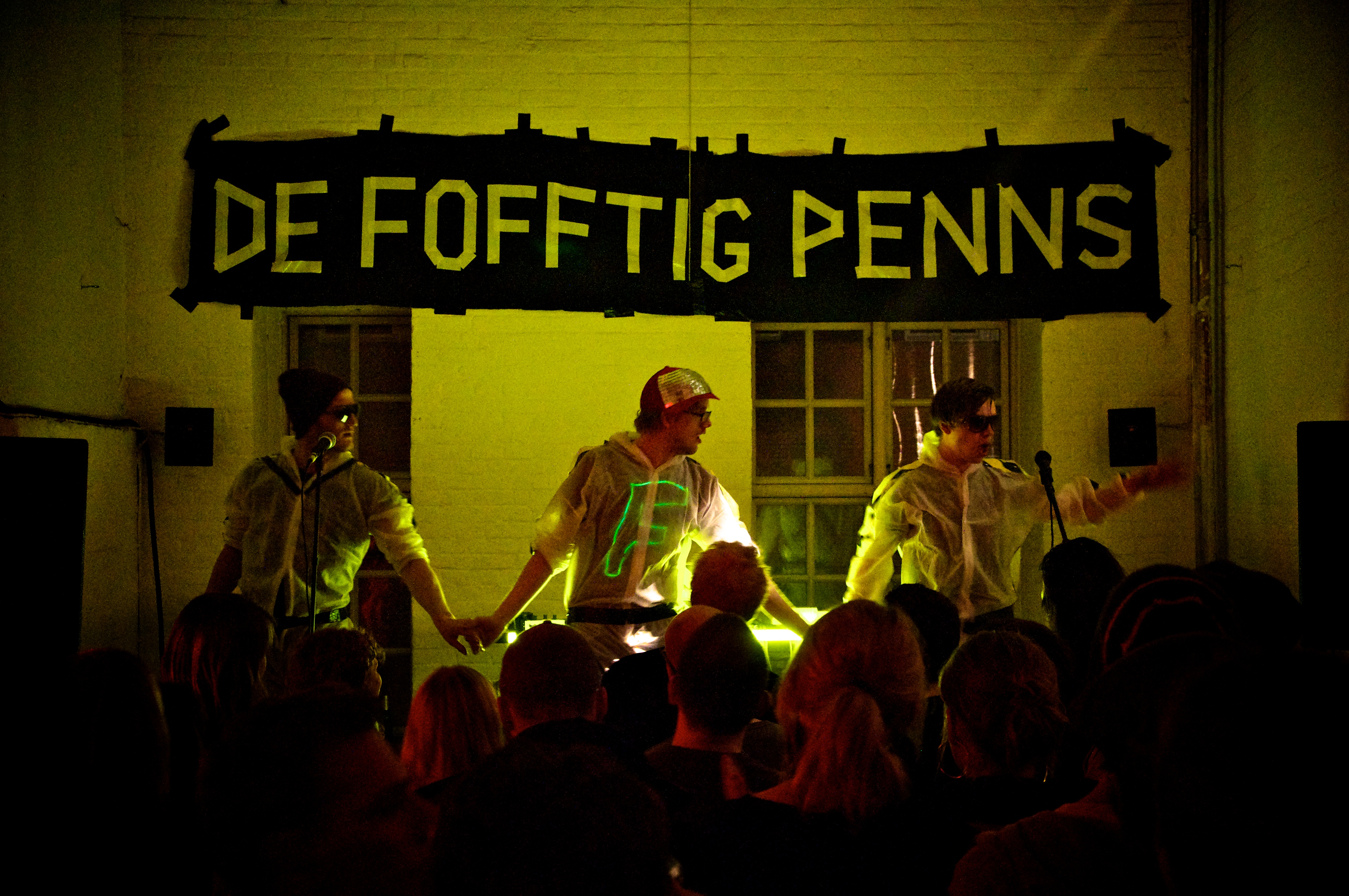
- Live in Hamburg, 2010

Background information
- Origin: Bremen, Germany
- Genres: Hip hop, electro
- Years active: 2009–2018
- Members: Riemelmeester Malde; Kommodige Jaykopp; Plietsche Torbän; Simoin
- Website: www.defofftigpenns.de

De fofftig Penns (Standard German: Die fünfzig Pfennige; English: The Fifty Pennies) was a German hip-hop and electro band. Unusually, their lyrics are exclusively in Low German, a minority Germanic language of northern Germany and the eastern Netherlands.

== History ==
De fofftig Penns was founded in 2003, purely for fun, by three schoolfriends from Bremen-Nord, a district of the port city of Bremen in north-west Germany. They were Malte Battefeld ("Riemelmeester Malde"), Jakob Köhler ("Kommodige Jaykopp") and Torben Otten ("Plietsche Torbän"). Until near the end of their schooldays, they knew hardly any Low German at all. They chose the name as a tongue-in-cheek tribute to American rapper 50 Cent; their first song was a parody of his song "P.I.M.P.". They were attracted by the idea of performing in a modern musical genre using a dialect most often associated with their grandparents' generation. Jaykopp has said that their first song was not free of linguistic mistakes, but that after a while they all learned to speak good Low German. His grandmother was delighted that they had learned how to chat with their grandparents in their native tongue. Torbän's grandmother has even attended one of the band's more recent concerts; but left rapidly, because it was too loud. The band broke up after its members graduated from school, but reformed in 2007.

They began to perform live in 2009, as a supporting act for other bands in northern Germany. In October 2009, they competed as the representatives for Low German at Liet International, a music competition for the regional and minority languages of Europe, where they placed eighth but attracted favourable critical attention.

In early 2010, they began to tour as a headline act. In August and September 2010, they performed live at seven schools in northern Germany, on the invitation of the Lower Saxony School Board. Jaykopp said that the band had to get out of bed at the same time as the schoolkids so that they could carry out soundchecks at 8 AM - but that when they saw the kids dancing on tables at 10 AM, they knew that the kids were now awake.

The band represented the German state of Bremen in the Bundesvision Song Contest 2013 with their song "Löppt" (English: "It Works"), where they placed seventh.

For inspiration, they largely rely on songs by better-known musicians; such as Nachlader, Egotronic, Mediengruppe Telekommander, Saalschutz and Supershirt. Their 2016 song "An de Nordseeküste" is a version of the 1985 song "An der Nordseeküste" by Klaus und Klaus - with backing vocals in Low German by the original performers.

The band disbanded in late 2018 following a farewell tour.

== Awards ==
- 2012 – Heinrich Schmidt Barrien Prize, for services to the Low German language.
- 2013 – HANS – Der Hamburger Musikpreis, Hamburger Nachwuchs des Jahres ("Hamburg Newcomers of the Year") - De fofftig Penns.
- 2013 – HANS – Der Hamburger Musikpreis, Hamburger Song des Jahres ("Hamburg Song of the Year") - De fofftig Penns, "Löppt".

== Personnel ==
- Riemelmeester Malde - rapping, vocals, synthesiser
- Kommodige Jaykopp - drum machine, laptop, rapping, vocals
- Plietsche Torbän - rapping, vocals, megaphone
- Simoin - producer, keyboards, accordion

== Partial discography ==
- 2010 – "Platt" (single, BoingBoingRecords)
- 2012 – "Loops" (single, Random Mode Records)
- 2013 – Dialektro (album, Welcome Home Music)
- 2013 – "Löppt" (single). Charted in Germany for one week at No. 87.
- 2014 – Een Vun De Fofftig Penns (EP, Welcome Home Music)
- 2015 – "Dasha 'n Ding" (single, Welcome Home Music)
- 2016 – "An de Noordseeküste" feat. Klaus und Klaus (single, Welcome Home Music)
