= Katarzyna Jaszczolt =

British linguist

Kasia Jaszczołt
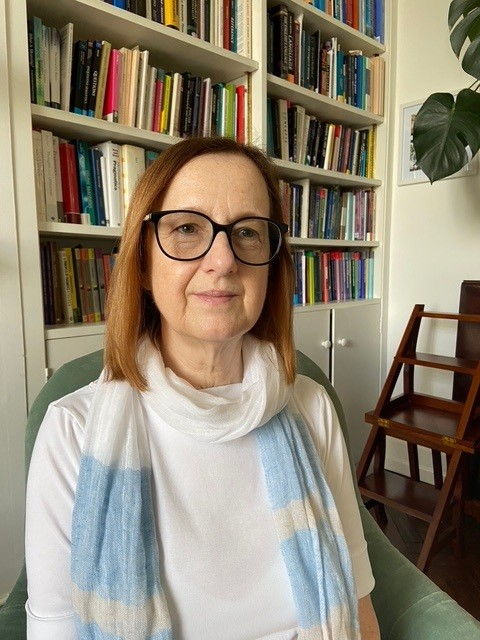
- Jaszczolt at Newnham College, 2017
- Education: University of Oxford
- Known for: Default semantics, research on belief ascription, semantics of propositional attitudes, and conceptualisation of time
- Scientific career
- Fields: Linguistics, Philosophy
- Workplaces: Newnham College, University of Cambridge

Katarzyna Małgorzata Jaszczołt (/ˈjɑːʃtʃoʊt/ ), known as Kasia Jaszczolt, born 9 December 1963, is a Polish linguist and philosopher. She is currently Professor of linguistics and philosophy of language at the University of Cambridge, and Professorial Fellow at Newnham College, Cambridge. She was the first Polish woman appointed to professorship at the University of Cambridge. She is the author of Default Semantics, a theory of discourse meaning.

== Life, education and career ==
Kasia Jaszczolt was born in Łódź, Poland, where she attended the prestigious Nicolaus Copernicus Lycée, before studying English (1982–87) and Philosophy (1983-88) at the University of Łódź. Her master’s thesis in linguistics was devoted to the influence of the Vienna Circle philosophy of language on paradigms in modern linguistics. Her master’s thesis in philosophy concerned the applicability of Kuhn’s paradigms to linguistics. She conducted her doctoral studies at the University of Oxford (1988-1992), first as a Soros scholar at Somerville College and subsequently as Rawnsley scholar at St Hugh’s College. She received her D.Phil. from the University of Oxford for the thesis in philosophy of language devoted to belief sentences and the semantics of propositional attitude reports.

She took up the position of Assistant Lecturer at the University of Cambridge in 1995, followed by posts as Lecturer and Reader. Since 2010 she has been full Professor of Linguistics and Philosophy of Language at the University of Cambridge, where in addition to teaching and research she has held various administrative roles, including Head of Department and President of Cambridge Institute of Linguistic Research. Jaszczolt has also been a Fellow and Director of Studies in Linguistics of Newnham College since 1995. Previously she taught at universities of Oxford, Sussex and Brighton.

From 1996 to 2008 she was principal editor of a book series Current Research in the Semantics/Pragmatics Interface, Elsevier. She has also served as an officer of the Linguistics Association of Great Britain (LAGB). She is general editor of a book series Oxford Studies of Time in Language and Thought, Oxford University Press, and member of several editorial boards of linguistics journals and book series, including Journal of Pragmatics and Intercultural Pragmatics.

== Research ==
Her academic career combines interests in meaning in natural language and in communication with interests in philosophy of language and mind, epistemology and metaphysics. From her early work on propositional attitude reports and semantic and pragmatic ambiguities she moved to projects on expressing the self across languages and cultures and, more recently, representing time in language and linguistic explanations of human experience of time flow.

Her theory of Default Semantics breaks away from the tradition of modelling utterance meaning by means of a sentence-based proposition and proposes instead so-called dynamic functional propositions, represented as merger representations – conceptual representations that combine the output of various linguistic and non-linguistic sources of information leading to the recovery of speaker meaning, shifting compositionality from the level of syntactic structures to the level of the merger.

She has published widely on various topics in philosophy of language, semantics and pragmatics. She is the author of 6 authored books, 13 edited and co-authored volumes, and over 100 research articles.

== Awards and honours ==
- Alumnus VIP, University of Łódź (2015)
- Elected member of Academia Europaea (2012)

== Selected publications ==
- Semantics, Pragmatics, Philosophy: A Journey Through Meaning. 2023. Cambridge: Cambridge University Press.
- Meaning in Linguistic Interaction: Semantics, Metasemantics, Philosophy of Language. 2016. Oxford: Oxford University Press.
- Representing Time: An Essay on Temporality as Modality. 2009. Oxford: Oxford University Press.
- Default Semantics: Foundations of a Compositional Theory of Acts of Communication. 2005. Oxford: Oxford University Press.
- Semantics and Pragmatics: Meaning in Language and Discourse. 2002. London: Longman.
- Discourse, Beliefs and Intentions: Semantic Defaults and Propositional Attitude Ascription. 1999. Oxford: Elsevier Science.
