= A.G.Trio =

Austrian electro house group

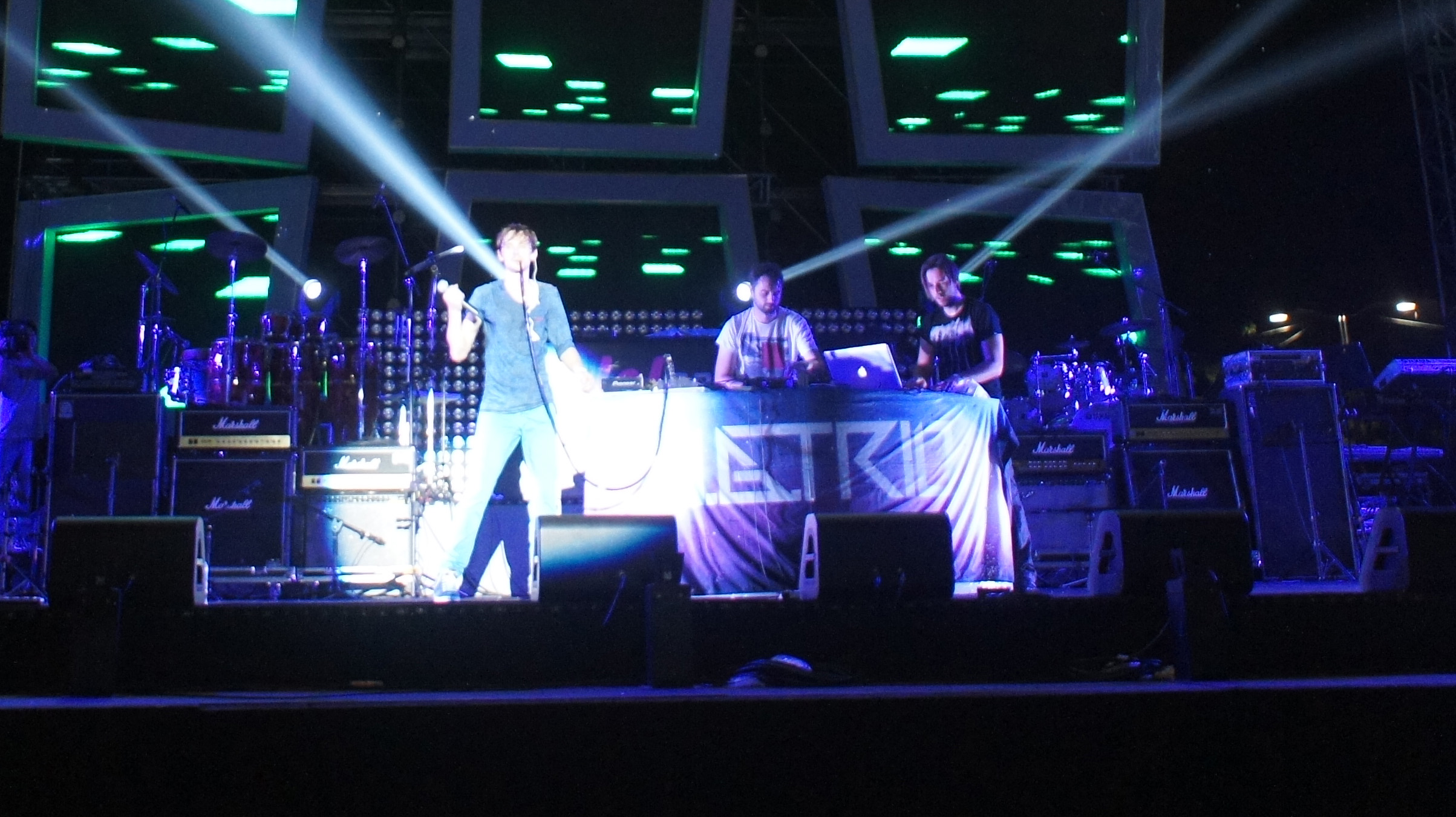
- The A.G.Trio performing live at World Electronica Carnival in South Korea, August 2012

Background information
- Also known as: Ages
- Origin: Linz, Austria
- Genre: Electro house
- Years active: 2004-present
- Labels: Freaks like us!, Etage Noir Special
- Members: Roland von der Aist; Andy Korg; Aka Tell
- Website: theagtrio.com; ages-music.com

A.G.Trio is an Austrian electro house group. It was founded in 2004 in Novi Sad, Serbia, during a combined tour of the founding members Roland von der Aist, Andy Korg & Aka Tell (civil names Roland Bindreiter, Jürgen Oman & Markus Reindl). The A.G.Trio is known for its excessive live-act and its remixes for popular Artists like Parov Stelar. In December 2014 they announced that A.G.Trio is on hiatus and presented their new project Ages.

== History ==
A.G.Trio was founded in 2004 out of the solo artists Roland Bindreiter, Jürgen Oman and Markus Reindl from the upper Austrian artist collective Backlab during a concert trip to Novi Sad, Serbia, under the name "Adalbert Günther Trio".

After releasing many singles, EPs and remixes, A.G.Trio released a double-album called "Action" in 2012, which contained both their own productions as well as remixes. After extensive touring with their debut album, the band released a compilation called "Reaction" that collects the remixes they had made over the past two years. In April 2014, they confirmed in an interview with the Austrian magazine The Gap that they are already working on their second album.

In December 2014 they announced that A.G.Trio is on hiatus and presented their new project Ages. In November 2015, on the occasion of the release of their album "Roots", Ages was named "Artist of the Week" on the Austrian radio station FM4.

In late 2017 band member Markus Reindl was announced artistic director of the newly founded Stream Festival in Linz. In interviews he gave on that occasion he made no statement about the status of the band project.

== Discography ==
=== Albums ===
- 2012: Action (2xCD, Etage Noir Special)

=== Compilations ===
- 2014: Reaction (CD, Etage Noir Special)

=== Singles & EPs ===
- 2009: Zombies In The Disco (Digital, Etage Noir Special)
- 2009: Electro Messiah (Digital)
- 2009: Things You Wanna Play (Digital, Freaks Like Us! Entertainment)
- 2009: Replay (Digital, Freaks Like Us! Entertainment)
- 2010: Dancen (Digital, Etage Noir Special)
- 2010: Bass Effect (Digital, Etage Noir Special)
- 2010: Planet Disco (Digital, Etage Noir Special)
- 2011: Everyone With Us (Digital, Etage Noir Special)
- 2012: Everyone Withs Us (Remixes) (Digital, Etage Noir Special)
- 2012: Countably Infinite feat. M. Zahradnicek (Digital, Etage Noir Special)
- 2012: Moldance (Digital, Etage Noir Special)
- 2012: Give A Damn (Digital, Etage Noir Special)
- 2013: Duckstep (Digital, Etage Noir Special)
- 2013: Slice & Stitch EP (Digital, Etage Noir Special)

=== Remixes ===
- 2008: Hot Pants Road Club - Especially Tonight (FM Music)
- 2009: Johnny Mitchell - Errare (Freaks Like Us! Entertainment)
- 2009: Näd Mika - UFO (Drunkn Punx Rec.)
- 2010: Eriq Johnson - Boy Who Is A Girl (Dandy Kids Records)
- 2010: Egotronic - Was Solls (Audiolith Records)
- 2010: Bilderbuch - Bitte, Herr Märtyrer (Schönwetter Schallplatten)
- 2010: ULTRNX - Rockstr (Audiolith Records)
- 2010: Just Banks - Blockparty (Proper Nightlife)
- 2011: Bunny Lake - Army Of Lovers (Universal Music Group)
- 2011: Ira Atari - Don't Wanna Miss You (Audiolith Records)
- 2011: Dead C∆T Bounce & You Killing me - Justice! (Mähtrasher)
- 2011: The Sexinvaders - LA Love (Riot Riot)
- 2012: Gorillas On Drums - We Are God (Dreieck)
- 2012: Pola-Riot – Brazza (Etage Noir Special)
- 2012: Orchestra Psychodelia - Cybertown (Etage Noir Special)
- 2012: Tits & Clits – Daedalus (Gigabeat)
- 2012: Parov Stelar – Nobody's Fool (Etage Noir Recordings)
- 2012: Cosmic Sand – Sombra (Jet Set Trash Records)
- 2012: Hypomaniacs – There's No Way Back (Jet Set Trash Records)
- 2013: The Sexinvaders – Empire (Pink Pong Records)
- 2013: Russkaja – Energia (Napalm Records)
- 2013: Beef Theatre – Beef Is Back (Techno Changed My Life)
- 2013: Allen Alexis – Who Cares (Lamb Lane Records)

=== Albums as Ages ===
- 2015: Roots (Vinyl/CD/Digital, Etage Noir Special)

=== Singles as Ages ===
- 2015: Return (Digital, Etage Noir Special)
- 2015: I Want It (Digital, Etage Noir Special)
- 2015: Hymn (Digital, Etage Noir Special)
- 2015: Chances (Digital, Etage Noir Special)

== Music videos ==
=== A.G.Trio ===
List of music videos, showing year released and director
Title	Year	Director(s)
"Dancen"	2010	A.G.Trio
"Planet Disco"	2010	Luzi Katamay, Christian Dietl
"Everyone With Us"	2011	A.G.Trio
"Countably Infinite feat. M. Zahradnicek"	2012	Luzi Katamay

=== Ages ===
List of music videos, showing year released and director
Title	Year	Director
"Return (feat. Zanshin)"	2014	Jürgen Oman
"I Want It (feat. Laura Goméz)"	2015	Jürgen Oman
"Hymn (feat. Inner)"	2015	Andreas Jalsovec
"Chances (feat. Johannes Eder)"	2015	Jürgen Oman

== Charts ==
A.G.Trio's "Countably Infinite" feat. M. Zahradnicek entered the charts of Austrian radio station FM4 on 12 May 2012 and was number one for two weeks. It stayed in the charts for seven weeks and was number 13 in the FM4 year charts of 2012, which was highest charting title by an Austrian artist or group.

"Countably Infinite" also entered the German Club Charts on 25 May 2012 and remained in the charts for five weeks with best position 7.

A.G.Trio's singles "Dancen", "Planet Disco" and "Countably Infinite", as well as their album "Action" reached position one in their respective genre charts on iTunes in Austria.

The singles "Replay" and "Things You Wanna Play" reached top rankings in the Canadian and U.S. dance charts.

All four Ages singles entered the radio FM4 charts in 2015 with "Chances" feat. Johannes Eder taking position 13 in the FM4 year charts of 2015.

== Awards ==
In 2010 A.G.Trio was voted "Soundpark Band of the Year" by the listeners of the Austrian radio station FM4.

In 2013 A.G.Trio was nominated in the categories "Electronic/Dance" and "FM4 Award" at the Amadeus Austrian Music Awards. They were again nominated for the Amadeus Austrian Music Award in the category "Electronic/Dance" in 2015.

Ages was nominated for the "FM4 Award" at the Amadeus Austrian Music Awards in 2016.
