= Barbara Abbott =

American linguist

Barbara Kenyon Abbott
- Born: Barbara Kenyon Abbott; 1943 (age 82–83)

Academic background
- Education: University of California at Berkeley
- Thesis: A study of referential opacity (1976)
- Academic advisor: George Lakoff

Academic work
- Discipline: Linguist
- Sub-discipline: Semantics; Pragmatics
- Institutions: Michigan State University

Barbara Kenyon Abbott (born 1943) is an American linguist. She earned her PhD in linguistics in 1976 at the University of California at Berkeley under the supervision of George Lakoff. From 1976 to 2006, she was a professor in the department of linguistics and Germanic, Slavic, Asian, and African languages at Michigan State University, with a joint appointment in philosophy. She is now a Professor Emerita.

== Career ==
Abbott's semantics and pragmatics research examines topics in reference and noun phrase interpretation, focusing on philosophically influenced aspects of word meaning, presupposition, and conditional sentences. She has been pivotal in both uniting formal semantics—which adapts analytical techniques from logic to natural languages—and analytical pragmatics—which clarifies the workings of definite and indefinite noun phrases in English. Her work surveying the uses of definiteness in different languages shows how it has mainly been seen in terms of familiarity or uniqueness. Her book Reference, focusing on noun phrases as referring expressions, shows that the issue of speakers' use of language forms to refer to entities has been at the heart of debate among linguists and philosophers for centuries.

Abbott was a professor at Michigan State University where she taught linguistics and philosophy from 1976 to 2006. Her main concentrations are semantics and pragmatics Her book Reference focuses on the issue of how far reference is and if it is a two-place or three-place relation. Abbott is also known for her other published works which include Natural Language Semantics, Language, Linguistics and Philosophy, Journal of Pragmatics, and Mind. She has also published articles, such as Some Problems In Giving An Adequate Model-Theoretic Account of Cause in 1974, and Some Remarks on Referentiality, in 2011.

In 1993, Abbott received an Outstanding Faculty & Staff Award at MSU for "contributions to equal opportunities for achievement and providing an environment that encourages excellence". In 2005, she was an invited speaker at the Third International Conference in Contrastive Semantics and Pragmatics held in at the Shanghai International Studies University in China, and was featured as a guest speaker at the International Cognitive Science Conference held at Pomona College that same year. In 2009, she was an invited speaker at the Second Conference on Concept Types and Frames in Language, Cognition, and Science at the Heinrich-Heine-University of Duesseldorf.

Abbott has served on the editorial board of academic journals including The Journal of Pragmatics, Natural Language and Linguistic Theory, and Intercultural Pragmatics, as well as serving as a referee for articles in Philosophy of Science and in Language.

== Personal life ==
Abbott grew up in Greenwich, Connecticut and currently resides in Michigan with her husband, Larry Hauser.

== Publications ==
=== Books ===
- Abbott, B. 2010. Reference. Oxford: Oxford University Press.
- Gundel, Jeanette K. and Barbara Abbott, eds. 2019. The Oxford Handbook of Reference. Oxford University Press.

=== Significant articles ===
- Abbott, B. 1976. "Right node raising as a test for constituenthood," Linguistic Inquiry.
- Abbott, B. 1993. “A pragmatic account of the definiteness effect in existential sentences,” Journal of Pragmatics 19, 39–55.
- Abbott, B. 1995. "Some remarks on specificity," Linguistic Inquiry 26:2, 341–7.
- Abbott, B. 1996. "Doing without a partitive constraint," In J. Hoeksema (ed.) Partitives: Studies on the Syntax and Semantics of Partitive and Related Constructions.
- Abbott, B. 1997. “Definiteness and existentials,” Language.
- Abbott, B. 1997. “A note on the nature of 'Water'." Mind 106, 311–319.
- Abbott, B. 1999. "Support for a unique theory of definiteness," Proceedings of Semantics and Linguistics Theory (SALT) 9.
- Abbott, B. 1999. “Water = H2O." Mind 108, 145–148.
- Abbott, B. 2000. “Presuppositions as nonassertions,” Journal of Pragmatics, 32: 1419–1437.
- Abbott, B. 2002. "Donkey Demonstratives," Natural Language Semantics.
- Abbott, B. 2002. "Definiteness and Proper Names: Some Bad News for the Description Theory," Journal of Semantics.
- Abbott, B. 2003. "Some notes on quotation," Belgian Journal of Linguistics.
- Abbott, B. 2003. "A reply to Szabo's "Descriptions and uniqueness," Philosophical Studies.
- Abbott, B. 2004. “Definiteness and Indefiniteness,” The Handbook of Pragmatics, L Horn and G. Ward (eds.) Malden. MA: Blackwell.
- Abbott, B. 2006. “Definite and Indefinite," Encyclopedia of Language and Linguistics.
- Abbott, B. 2008. “Presuppositions and Common Ground,” Linguistics and Philosophy.
- Abbott, B. 2010. “Where have some of the presuppositions gone?” Drawing the Boundaries of Meaning: Neo-Gricean Studies in Pragmatics and Semantics in Honor of Laurence R. Horn, B. Birner, G. Ward (eds.) Amsterdam/Philadelphia: John Benjamins.
- Abbott, B. 2011. "Out of control: The semantics of some infinitival VP complements, " In Pragmatics and Autolexical Grammar: In honor of Jerry Sadock, edited by Etsuyo Yuasa, Tista Bagchi and Katharine Beals. pp. 229–242. Amsterdam/Philadelphia: John Benjamins.
- Horn, L. and B. Abbott. 2012. "(in)definiteness and implicature," In W. Kabasenche, M. O'Rourke, and M Slater (eds.) Reference and Referring. MIT Press.
- Abbott, B. 2013. Linguistic solutions to philosophical problems: The case of knowing how. In John Hawthorne & Jason Turner, eds., Philosophical Perspectives 27, 1–21.
