= Rasmus Andresen =

German politician (born 1986)

Rasmus Andresen MEP
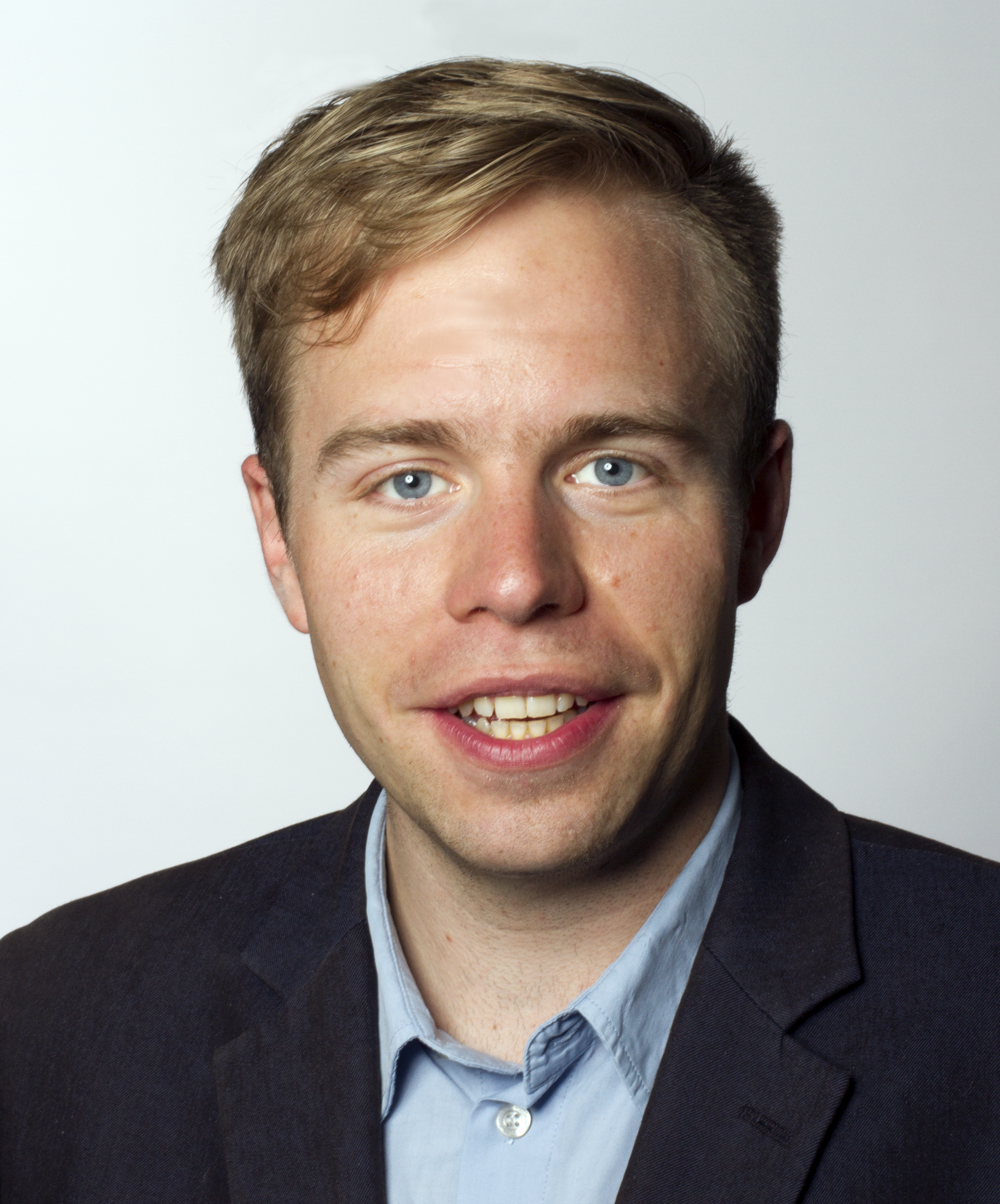
- Andresen in 2016

Member of the European Parliament for Germany
- Incumbent
- Assumed office 2 July 2019

Personal details
- Born: 20 February 1986 (age 40) Essen, West Germany
- Party: German; Alliance 90/The Greens; EU; European Green Party
- Education: Roskilde University

Rasmus Andresen (born 20 February 1986) is a German politician of the Alliance 90/The Greens who has been serving as a Member of the European Parliament since 2019.

== Biography ==
Andresen was born in Essen. He mainly grew up in Flensburg and belongs to the Danish minority of Southern Schleswig. He graduated from Duborg-Skolen in Flensburg and later with a bachelor's degree from Roskilde University in Denmark.

== Political career ==
From 2009 to 2019, Andresen served as a member of the Landtag of Schleswig-Holstein, representing Flensburg. At the time of his first election, he was the parliament's youngest member at 23. From 2017 until 2019, he served as vice-president of the Landtag.

Andresen has been a Member of the European Parliament since the 2019 European elections. He has since been serving on the Committee on Budgets. He is also his parliamentary group's coordinator on the committee.

In addition to his committee assignments, Andresen is part of the Parliament's delegation for relations with Canada. He is also a member of the European Internet Forum, the European Parliament Intergroup on Anti-Corruption, the European Parliament Intergroup on Anti-Racism and Diversity, the European Parliament Intergroup on LGBT Rights, the European Parliament Intergroup on Seas, Rivers, Islands and Coastal Areas and the European Parliament Intergroup on Traditional Minorities, National Communities and Languages.

Since 2021, Andresen has been leading the German delegation within the Greens–European Free Alliance group, succeeding Sven Giegold.

== Other activities ==
- Institut Solidarische Moderne (ISM), Member (since 2010)

== Political positions ==
In May 2021, Andresen joined a group of 39 mostly Green Party lawmakers from the European Parliament who in a letter urged the leaders of Germany, France and Italy not to support Arctic LNG 2, a $21 billion Russian Arctic liquefied natural gas (LNG) project, due to climate change concerns.

On March 16, 2021, Andresen took on a godparenthood for Igor Bancer, a singer and political prisoner from Belarus.
