= Jacob L. Mey =

Danish linguist and author (1926–2023)

- Born: 30 October 1926; Amsterdam, Netherlands
- Died: 10 February 2023 (aged 96); Austin, Texas, U.S.
- Education: University of Copenhagen
- Scientific career
- Workplaces: University of Southern Denmark
- Thesis: (1960)
- Doctoral advisor: Louis Hjelmslev
- Doctoral students: Roger Schank

Jacob Louis Mey (30 October 1926 – 10 February 2023) was a Dutch-born Danish professor of linguistics, specializing in pragmatics. He was professor emeritus in the Institute of Language and Communication at the University of Southern Denmark, after retiring in 1996.

== Career ==
Mey received his PhD in Linguistics from the University of Copenhagen in 1960, supervised by Louis Hjelmslev. He has also worked at the University of Oslo, the University of Texas at Austin, Georgetown University, Yale University, Tsukuba University, The National Language Research Institute, Tokyo, Northwestern University, the City University of Hong Kong, the University of Frankfurt, Universidade Estadual de Campinas, Universidade de Brasília, the University of Haifa and Haifa Technion, Södertörn University College, and Örebro University.

Until 2010, he was chief editor of the Journal of Pragmatics, which he founded in 1977 with Hartmut Haberland. He was chief editor of RASK, the international journal of language and communication, and one of the founding editors of Pragmatics & Society.

Mey originated the notion of the pragmeme. His work with Roger Schank (his former student) and the Yale Artificial Intelligence group in the early 1980s influenced much of the early scientific work in AI on natural language processing.

In 1992 he was awarded an honorary doctorate by the University of Zaragoza.

In 2017, Elsevier Publishers established the Jacob L. Mey and Hartmut Haberland Early Career Award in recognition of the Journal of Pragmatics’ founding editors’ support for young scholars.

On 30 October 2021, Jacob L. Mey received the IPrA Award for Foundational Service in the Field of Pragmatics from the International Pragmatics Association.

== Personal life and death ==
Mey had a daughter from his first marriage with Kari Lothe. He was married to Inger Mey from 1965; they had five children: Sara (a veterinarian), IngerElise (a copyright lawyer), Jacob IV (a geochemistry professor), Alexandra (a microbiologist), and Kristianna (an ear, nose, and throat doctor).

Mey died in Austin, Texas on 10 February 2023, at the age of 96.

== Selected works ==
- Mey, Jacob L. Pragmalinguistics: Theory and Practice (1979) Rasmus Rask Studies in Pragmatic Linguistics 1. ISBN 90-279-7757-7
- Mey, Jacob L. Whose Language? A Study in Linguistic Pragmatics (1985) Pragmatics & Beyond Companion Series 3. ISBN 90-272-5004-9
- Mey, Jacob L. Pragmatics: An Introduction (1993) ISBN 0-631-18691-3. 2nd ed. (2001) ISBN 978-0-631-21132-7
- Gorayska, Barbara, and Jacob L. Mey. Cognitive technology. Springer London, 1996.
- Mey, Jacob L. (ed.) Concise Encyclopedia of Pragmatics (1998) ISBN 0-08-042992-0
- Mey, Jacob L. When Voices Clash: A Study in Literary Pragmatics (2000) Trends in Linguistics 115. ISBN 978-3-11-015821-2
- Mey, Jacob L. and István Kecskés (eds.). Intention, Common Ground and the Egocentric Speaker-Hearer (2008) Mouton Series in Pragmatics 4. ISBN 978-3-11-020606-7

== Sources ==
- Contributor biography, The handbook of Discourse Analysis, ed. Deborah Schiffrin, Deborah Tannen, and Heidi Ehernberger Hamilton, (2001, repr. 2004), ISBN 0-631-20596-9, pp. xv-xvi
- Jørgen Dines Johansen and Harly Sonne, "Foreword," Pragmatics and Linguistics: Festschrift for Jacob L. Mey on his 60th Birthday 30 October 1986, eds. Jørgen Dines Johansen, Harly Sonne, and Hartmut Haberland (1986) ISBN 87-7492-603-9
