= Captain Capa =

German electronic band

- Origin: Bad Frankenhausen, Germany
- Genres: Electronic music, Techno, Electropunk, Electroclash
- Years active: 2007-present
- Label: Audiolith Records
- Members: Hannes „Ashi“ Naumann; Maik Biermann

Captain Capa is a German electronic band from Bad Frankenhausen. The band was first signed at Cobretti Records but has been signed at Audiolith Records since 2010.

== Work ==
In December 2007 Captain Capa released their EP These Fights Are Never Over, which was re-released as a special edition including various remixes several months later. The EP also included the 2008 single "Adolescence".

The band's first album Tonight Is The Constant was produced by Hamburg-based Electro musician Norman Kolodziej (Der Tante Renate, Bratze) and released in 2009 at Cobretti Records. The Cover was designed by Hannes Naumann.

The album received mainly positive reviews. Michael Möller of Laut.de for instance called it a "truly acceptable record" with "fitting sound and direction". However, Möller stated he expected more originality for the next album. In his review for Intro, Benjamin Walter classified the music not as Techno but rather as "High-Speed-Pop", which he described as highly danceable. He specifically praised the choruses and the work of producer Kolodziej.

The album Ausflug mit Freunden by Egotronic features the song "You", a collaboration with Captain Capa. Furthermore, Naumann was featured in tracks by Juri Gagarin and Kasaka. In 2010, Captain Capa released the split EP Tote Tiere with Supershirt, which also features the eponymous title track, a collaboration between the two bands. The EP was released by Audiolith Records, where Captain Capa signed in the summer of 2010. The release was also accompanied by a tour through Germany.

In May 2011 Captain Capa released their second studio album, Saved My Life. It was also produced by Norman Kolodziej and released via Audiolith Records.

In September 2011, the band was awarded the "New Music Award" by various ARD youth radio programs.

In February 2012, Captain Capa was confirmed to be playing the Vans Warped Tour on select dates in July–August 2012.

They announced the release of their third album in fall 2013.

On 12 January 2015 Captain Capa has announced that Biermann will leave the band due to personal commitments. Despite this, new songs and an upcoming tour are scheduled to be released in the same year.

== Discography ==
Singles:

- 2008: Adolescence (Cobretti)
- 2011: Faraday (Audiolith)
- 2011: Rivals (feat. Deniz Jasperspen (Herrenmagazin)) (Audiolith)

EPs:

- 2007: These Fights Are Never Over (Cobretti)
- 2008: These Fights Are Never Over Special Edition (Cobretti)
- 2010: Tote Tiere (Split-EP with Supershirt)

Albums:

- 2009: Tonight Is The Constant (Cobretti)
- 2011: Saved My Life (Audiolith)
- 2013: Foxes
