= Knud Illeris =

Danish scientist

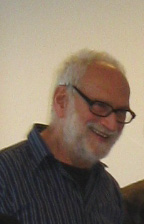
Knud Illeris in Roskilde University. Denmark, 2013

Knud Illeris (born 7 March 1939) is a Danish scientist and professor of lifelong learning. His work mainly revolves around the way adults learn and continue to do so. Illeris' work both as author and editor is widely renowned and published in more than ten countries, including China, Germany and the Netherlands. In 2005 Knud Illeris was made Honorary Adjunct Professor of Teachers College, Columbia University, New York City.
Other objectives of his work are skill development and workplace learning.

== Theory ==
Illeris' concept of learning is based on his idea of three dimensions of learning and competence development. These three main dimensions are Functionality, Sensitivity and Integration.

Functionality refers to the learning content and the individual's capacity and understanding thereof.
Sensitivity stresses the importance of the individual's incentive for learning: motivation, emotion and volition.
The final dimension is that of Integration: the ways in which the individual can adhere the learning to make sense to him. This dimension focuses on interaction with fellow learners or the environment.

These are the core elements of Illeris' learning theory, but all in all he maintains a very broad concept of learning, which is illustrated in his editing of the book Contemporary Theories of Learning.
