= Gundel (surname) =

Gundel is a German language surname derived from a given name beginning with gund "battle". Notable people with the name include:

- Bence Gundel-Takács (1998), Hungarian football player
- Jeanette Gundel (1942–2019), American linguist
- Károly Gundel (1883–1956), Hungarian restaurateur
