= Messed Up =

Belarusian girls' punk rock band from Grodno

- Messed Up live in Grodno (March 2020)

Background information
- Origin: Grodno, Belarus
- Genres: Punk rock
- Years active: 2015–2021; 2022–2025
- Labels: Audiolith Records
- Members: Nastya; Liza; Masha

Messed Up were a punk rock band from Grodno, West Belarus. Formed in 2015, they have been referred to as the first all-female punk band in Belarus and compared to the riot grrrl movement.

Their lyrical themes were mostly concerned with "how a post-Soviet society favours an ordinary person, and how people in positions of power oppress those who choose to live differently". Due to their country's authoritarian government, restriction of personal and political freedoms, as well as its patriarchal social norms, Messed Up have oftentimes had to organise concerts practically illegally and thus had arguably found greater success playing abroad in the neighbouring countries of Poland and Lithuania, where they had frequently performed at numerous points throughout the band's history. Igor Bancer, frontman of Grodno-based street punk group Mister X, helped the band grow and aided its members with translation as well as promotion; Messed Up and Mister X had also performed together at various concerts in several countries across Eastern Europe. For a time, Messed Up founding member Katya also played as the drummer for Mister X.

All members of the band were activists in their personal lives and strictly opposed sexism, homophobia, racism, fascism, and ageism. Inspired by left-wing and anarchist themes, all the founding members were in their late teens when the band was formed and identified as feminists. Messed Up have played alongside Moscow Death Brigade in Germany, at the Wrocław Tattoo Konwent 2017, as well as performing at the fourth edition of the 161 Fest in Warszawa, Poland. They released their first demo available for free download in October 2016. Their first full-length album, released on vinyl and CD in November 2019 via Audiolith Records, was met with positive reviews and followed by a promotional tour throughout Germany with their own workshops about the feminist scene in Belarus. The band has been featured in a number of international media, from interviews in old-school punk zines to articles in online multilingual projects.

In early to mid August 2020, when the 2020 Belarusian protests escalated following the announcement of falsified election results, two members of the band (first Timofei and then Maryia) were imprisoned by police forces of the authoritarian government for taking part in demonstrations against the regime. However, eventually they were both released after some time in arrest. Most members of Messed Up were eventually forced to leave Belarus due to political repression and found refuge in Poland; due to this and the damaging effects of the COVID-19 pandemic, in July 2021, the band decided to indefinitely cease their activity. Nearly a year later, in March 2022, the band announced a return. Finally, on 4th May 2025, the group disbanded.

== Band members ==
The band started out as an all-female group, but in late 2018 their drummer Katya left the band and moved out of Grodno to pursue her career. While looking for a new female drummer, Artur Lemantovich from The Goonzz! and Mister X stepped in to help as a temporary drummer for Messed Up. Liza, one of the founding members and the band's guitarist, wrote the lyrics for Messed Up's songs.

=== Last line-up ===
- Anastasiya "Nastya" Kapytok – vocals
- Lizaveta "Liza" Krotek – guitar, backing vocals
- Maryia "Masha" Yatsevskaya – bass guitar, backing vocals
- Aleksandra - drums

=== Former members ===
- Ekaterina "Katya" Khvostikova – drums
- Artur "Archie" Lemantovich - drums
- Timofei "Tim" Shtarev – drums

== Discography ==
- 100% GRLZZZ PUNK ROCK (2016 demo)
- Всё во что ты веришь / Everything you believe in (2019 album)
