= Warped Tour 2012 =

2012 concert tour

- Tour by Warped Tour
- Location: North America; United Kingdom
- Start date: June 16, 2012
- End date: November 10, 2012
- No. of shows: 42

Warped Tour concert chronology
- Warped Tour 2011; Warped Tour 2012; Warped Tour 2013

Warped Tour 2012 was the eighteenth edition of the Vans Warped Tour. The North American leg of the tour began in Salt Lake City, Utah, on June 16, 2012 and ended in Portland, Oregon on August 5, 2012 and spanned 41 dates. The tour’s roster and line-up was revealed at a launch party on March 29, 2012 at Club Nokia in Los Angeles. The party featured performances from Yellowcard, Falling in Reverse, The Used and more.

One week after the final show in Portland, a single UK date of November 10, 2012, was announced on the Warped Tour website, with the venue being The Alexandra Palace in London. The full line-up was also listed, and tickets were available to purchase on the same day. 2012 was the first time that the Vans Warped Tour had travelled to the UK since 1999, thirteen years prior.

The tour featured thirteen unique stages, the majority of which were named after sponsors of the year’s tour. Larger bands would play all of their dates on main stages such as the Kia and Monster Energy stages for the whole tour, whereas bands with less of a following played on the smaller stages on select dates of the tour.

Warped Tour 2012 featured over 100 performing bands and artists, the most notable of which included All Time Low, Pierce The Veil, Rise Against and Mayday Parade. In an article for Alternative Press, Rachel Campbell ranked 2012 ninth in her list of top ten Warped Tour line-ups.

== Bands ==
- A Loss For Words
- After The Burial
- All Time Low
- Amyst
- Anthony Raneri
- Anti Flag
- Ballyhoo!
- Bangups
- Bayside
- Blessthefall
- Blood On The Dance Floor
- Born Of Osiris
- Breathe Carolina
- Brian Marquis
- Captain Capa
- CatchingYourClouds
- Champagne Champagne
- Chelsea Grin
- Cherri Bomb
- Chuck Ragan
- Chunk! No, Captain Chunk!
- Cold Forty Three
- Danielle Barbe
- Dead Sara
- Divided By Friday
- Dustin Jones And The Rising Tide
- Echo Movement
- Emily's Army
- Every Time I Die
- Falling In Reverse
- Fireworks
- For Today
- Four Year Strong
- Funeral Party
- G-Eazy
- Hostage Calm
- Hyro Da Hero
- I Am The Avalanche
- I Call Fives
- I Fight Dragons
- Impending Doom
- Into It. Over It.
- It Boys!
- Iwrestledabearonce
- June Divided
- Justina
- Koji
- Living With Lions
- Lost In Society
- Lostprophets
- Machine Gun Kelly
- Make Do And Mend
- Man Overboard
- Matt Toka
- Mayday Parade
- Memphis May Fire
- Mighty Mongo
- Miss May I
- Mod Sun
- Motionless In White
- Neo Geo
- New Empire
- New Found Glory
- Noise Brigade
- Of Mice And Men
- Oh No Fiasco
- Owen Plant
- Pierce The Veil
- Polar Bear Club
- Railroad To Alaska
- Rise Against
- Rise To Remain
- Senses Fail
- Sick Of Sarah
- Skip The Foreplay
- Sleeping With Sirens
- Sleepwalker
- Stepdad
- Streetlight Manifesto
- Super Water Sympathy
- T. Mills
- Taking Back Sunday
- Taylor Thrash
- Ten Second Epic
- The Constellations
- The Darlings
- The Ghost Inside
- The Green
- The Jukebox Romantics
- The Scissors
- The Silver Comet
- The Used
- They All Float
- Title Fight
- Tomorrow's Bad Seeds
- Tonight Alive
- Tony D'Angelo
- Transit
- Twin Atlantic
- Vampires Everywhere!
- Vanna
- Vinnie Caruana
- Wax
- We Are The In Crowd
- We Are The Ocean
- We The Kings
- Wick-it The Instigator
- Yellowcard
- You Me At Six

== Tour dates ==
Date	City	Country	Venue
North America
June 16, 2012	Salt Lake City	United States	Utah State Fairpark
June 17, 2012	Denver	United States	Sports Authority Field at Mile High
June 20, 2012	Las Vegas	United States	Luxor Hotel Parking Lot
June 21, 2012	Irvine	United States	Orange County Great Park
June 22, 2012	Pomona	United States	Pomona Fairplex
June 23, 2012	San Francisco	United States	AT&T Parking Lot
June 24, 2012	Ventura	United States	Ventura County Fair
June 27, 2012	Chula Vista	United States	Cricket Wireless Amphitheatre
June 28, 2012	Glendale	United States	Camelback Ranch
June 29, 2012	Las Cruces	United States	NMSU Practice Field
June 30, 2012	San Antonio	United States	AT&T Center
July 1, 2012	Houston	United States	Reliant Centre Parking Lot
July 3, 2012	Dallas	United States	Gexa Energy Pavilion
July 5, 2012	Maryland Heights	United States	Verizon Wireless Amphitheatre
July 6, 2012	Auburn Hills	United States	The Palace of Auburn Hills
July 7, 2012	Tinley Park	United States	First Midwest Bank Amphitheatre
July 8, 2012	Shakopee	United States	Canterbury Park
July 9, 2012	Bonner Springs	United States	Sandstone Amphitheatre
July 10, 2012	Noblesville	United States	Klipsch Music Center
July 11, 2012	Cuyahoga Falls	United States	Blossom Music Center
July 12, 2012	Burgettstown	United States	First Niagara Pavilion
July 13, 2012	Holmdel	United States	PNC Bank Arts Center
July 14, 2012	Montreal	Canada	Notre-Dame Basilica
July 15, 2012	Toronto	Canada	Flats At Molson Canadian Amphitheatre
July 17, 2012	Darien Center	United States	Darien Lake Performing Arts Center
July 18, 2012	Scranton	United States	Toyota Pavilion
July 19, 2012	Mansfield	United States	Comcast Center
July 20, 2012	Camden	United States	Susquehanna Bank Center
July 21, 2012	Uniondale	United States	Nassau Veterans Memorial Coliseum
July 22, 2012	Hartford	United States	Comcast Theatre
July 24, 2012	Columbia	United States	Merriweather Post Pavilion
July 25, 2012	Virginia Beach	United States	Farm Bureau Live at Virginia Beach
July 26, 2012	Atlanta	United States	Aaron's Amphitheatre at Lakewood
July 27, 2012	Orlando	United States	Central Florida Fairgrounds
July 28, 2012	West Palm Beach	United States	Cruzan Amphitheatre
July 29, 2012	St. Petersburg	United States	Vinoy Park
July 30, 2012	Charlotte	United States	Charlotte Verizon Wireless Amphitheatre
July 31, 2012	Cincinnati	United States	Riverbend Music Center
August 1, 2012	Milwaukee	United States	Marcus Amphitheatre
August 4, 2012	Auburn	United States	White River Amphitheatre
August 5, 2012	Portland	United States	Rose Quarter Riverfront
Europe
November 10, 2012	London	England	Alexandra Palace

== Sponsors ==
=== Featured ===
- Vans
- Kia
- Monster Energy

=== Other sponsors ===
- 1Love
- Action For Animals
- Air Force Reserve
- All Girl Skate Jam
- American Rag
- Alternative Press
- Arby's Foundation
- Arnette
- Art Feeds
- ASCAP
- Boarding For Breast Cancer
- BANDHAPPY
- Buy Green
- CANVAS Foundation
- Chicago Custom Percussion
- Century Media Records
- Dark Horse Percussion
- Daisy Rock
- Digitech
- Epitaph Records
- Equal Vision Records
- Ernie Ball
- Eventbrite
- Farm Animal Rights Movements
- Fat Kid Rules The World
- Fearless Records
- Feed Our Children Now
- f'real
- Fueled By Ramen
- Full Sail University
- Fuse
- The Gray Haven Project
- Greenvans
- The Hands That Rock
- Hollywood Waste
- Hopeless Records
- House Of Marley
- Invisible Children
- Jack In The Box
- John Lennon Educational Tour Bus
- Keep A Breast Foundation
- Klean Kanteen
- Krochet Kids
- Live Olley
- Living The Dream Foundation
- Mackr
- Magic: The Gathering
- MATADOR Beef Jerky
- Mr Broken Place
- NAMM
- NARAS
- Natural High
- Orange Amps
- Paradiddles
- Peta2
- Peter Says Denim
- Project X
- The Punky Pets
- Pure Noise Records
- Renee The Movie
- Rise Records
- Rockford Fosgate
- Sabian
- Shirts For A Cure
- SideOneDummy Records
- SJC Drums
- Skad
- Skelanimals
- So So Happy
- Snagola
- Sumerian Records
- Trojan
- Tilly's
- Truth Initiative
- To Write Love On Her Arms
- Umbrella Clothing
- Unite The United
- Visual Sound
- The Wishbone Foundation
