= Historical pragmatics =

Study of linguistic pragmatics over time

Historical pragmatics is the study of linguistic pragmatics over time. Research in historical pragmatics is mainly carried out on written corpora as recordings of spoken language are a relatively recent phenomenon.

== State of the art ==
Since the late 1970s, historical linguists have shown growing interest in pragmatic questions—first in German, then in Romance linguistics. The field has also been attracting more and more colleagues from English linguistics since the mid-1990s, with Andreas Jucker being one of the first and most influential proponents. In Romance linguistics, work by Ulrich Detges, Richard Waltereit, Maj-Britt Mosegaard Hansen and Jacqueline Visconti has led to a resurgence of historical pragmatic work focusing on the role of the listener in language change. The Journal of Historical Pragmatics is edited by Dawn Archer.

== Methodology ==
Historical pragmatics has to rely exclusively on written corpora. This leads to the question "How can we find out about the ways people talked to each other in medieval and early modern times?" The difficulty of unmasking spoken language in earlier periods has been discussed several times; for medieval times there are practically no reflexes of or on spoken language, and a majority of studies on historical pragmatics do not delve into texts prior to the 17th century.

== See also ==
- Historical linguistics
- Pragmatics
- Speech act
- Text linguistics
- Henry Cecil Wyld
