= Innaway =

- Origin: Orange County, California
- Genres: neo-psychedelia indie rock psychedelic rock shoegaze
- Years active: 2001-2011
- Labels: Some Records; Audiolith Records; Prime Directive Records
- Members: Jim Schwartz; Barry Fader; Reid Black; Darrick Rasmussen; Gabe Palmer
- Past members: Maori Konishi
- Website: innawaymusic.com

Innaway was an American psychedelic rock band from Southern California formed in 2001. In 2002, their demo was pressed in limited quantities by German label Audiolith Records but there wasn't a US release until 2005 when Some Records released a self-titled album by the band. Critical reviews were positive for the debut with music critic John Brady selecting it as one of the top three records of 2005 for NPR's Day to Day show. The band then spent some time on the road supporting the album touring with likes of Echo & the Bunnymen and The Brian Jonestown Massacre. In 2007 they released a 12" E.P. on Prime Directive Records. In 2011, they released their follow-up LP on their own via digital distribution on iTunes called Innaway 2. Both LP's were mixed at Soma Electronic Music Studios by John McEntire. The band toured with the reunited Rival Schools in 2008.

== Discography ==
=== Singles & EPs ===
- (2002) - The Ghost Admirers (EP) (Audiolith Records)
- (2005) - Rise (single) (Some Records)
- (2007) - Tired of Waiting (EP) (Prime Directive Records)

=== Albums ===
- (2005) - Innaway (Some Records)
- (2011) - Innaway 2 (self-released)

== Trivia ==
- Reid Black plays bass in the re-united line-up of Into Another.
- Gabe Palmer played drums in The Aquabats as the fictional character "Dr. Rock" on their album "The Aquabats! vs. the Floating Eye of Death!".
- The song "Rise" is featured on the soundtrack for the David Arquette-directed movie, The Tripper.
- "Stolen Days", "Tiny Brains", and "Threathawk" are featured in Tony Hawk's Secret Skatepark Tour 3 skate video.
