= Hartmut Haberland =

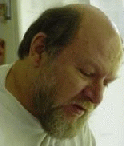
Hartmut Haberland

Hartmut Haberland (born 3 February 1948 in Hanover, Germany) is a German-Danish linguist and professor emeritus at Roskilde University in Denmark.

In 1977, he founded the Journal of Pragmatics together with Jacob Mey. Currently, he is a co-editor of Pragmatics and Society, and an editor of Acta Linguistica Hafniensia, the journal of the Linguistic Circle of Copenhagen.

In 2005, Haberland became a Danish citizen.

== Research ==
Haberland's textbook Soziologie + Linguistik. Die schlechte Aufhebung sozialer Ungleichheit durch Sprache from 1973 was used in Europe as his first work with widespread recognition.

The launch of Journal of Pragmatics (with co-editor Jacob L. Mey) went against the Chomskyan perspectives on linguistics at the time. This was part of the establishment of an interdisciplinary linguistics.

Haberland has also done important work in the area of language contact and the domains of certain languages. In particular, he created attention to the influence of English on the Danish language in terms of power and ideology, through concepts on hegemony and globalization.

== Career ==
Haberland studied German, linguistics and philosophy at the Freie Universität Berlin, Technische Universität Berlin and University of Stuttgart. He graduated with an MA from Freie Universität Berlin in 1971. After teaching at Freie Universität Berlin he took a job at Roskilde University in 1974, first as an associate professor. In 2012, he become professor of German language and the sociolinguistics of globalisation. He retired in 2018.

He has been a guest professor, researcher or summer school professor in Athens (1993), Soka (Japan) (1995), Beijing (1996), Guangzhou (2006), Osaka (2009), Hong Kong (2010 and 2011) and Shanghai (2019)). He was a keynote speaker at conferences in Kyoto (2009), Krakow (2017), and Shanghai (2019).

In 2011, a festschrift was published with contributions based on a symposium held at his 60th birthday in 2008.

In 2017, Elsevier Publishers inaugurated the Jacob L. Mey and Hartmut Haberland Early Career Award for young and promising researchers in the field of Pragmatics.
