= Saalschutz =

- Origin: Zurich, Switzerland
- Genres: Electronic music, electropop, Electropunk
- Years active: 2001–present
- Label: Audiolith Records
- Members: MT Dancefloor; DJ Flumroc
- Website: saalschutz.com

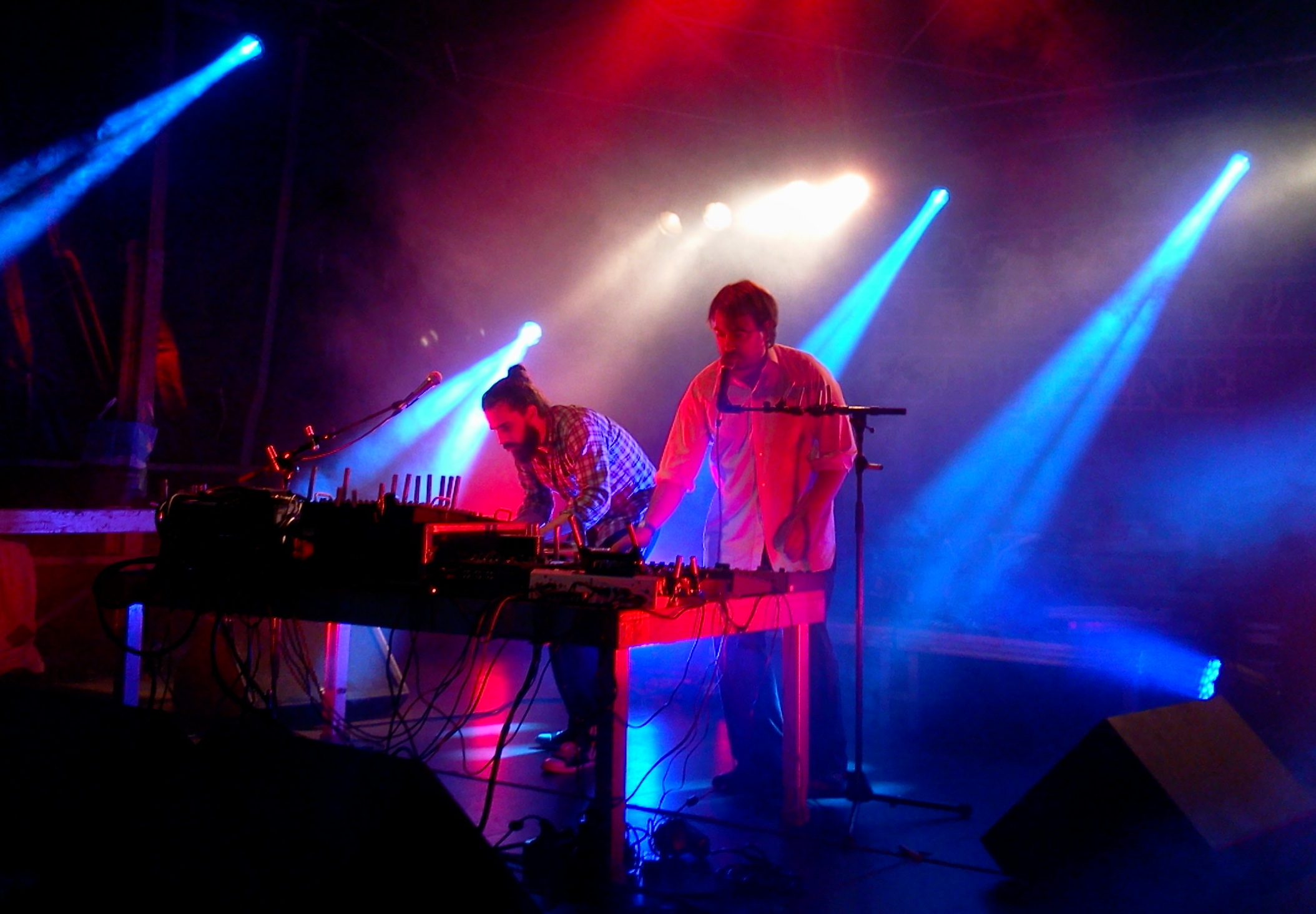
Saalschutz in 2013

Saalschutz is a Swiss electropop band from Zurich. The band classifies its style as "techno punk".

== Band history ==
After a split single with Knarf Rellöm, released on Rewika Records in 2003, the first album Das ist nicht mein Problem followed in 2004, released on ZickZack records. Saalschutz combines electronic dance music with mostly German, sometimes English and seldom French or Swiss German lyrics which often have dadaistic characteristics. It combines the styles of synthpop, electropunk and electroclash – as well as metal, garage rock, tribal house and trance – creating a style similar to that of Knarf Rellöm, Räuberhöhle and (in parts) Egotronic. In 2006, the second regular album Saalschutz machts möglich was released on ZickZack and Audiolith Records. (meaning "Saalschutz makes it possible") After touring extensively, the band released their third album Entweder Saalschutz in November 2010.

While, compared to bands like Egotronic or Frittenbude, not being explicitly political in their lyrics, Saalschutz supports political initiatives such as I Can't Relax in Deutschland or Rage Against Abschiebung.

== Discography ==
Singles:

- 2010 "Ravepunk für eine bessere Welt"
- 2010 "Headliner der Herzen"

Albums:

- 2004 Das ist nicht mein Problem
- 2006 Saalschutz machts möglich
- 2010 Entweder Saalschutz
- 2013 Saalschutz Nichtsnutz

Splits:

- 2003: Knarf Rellöm & DJ Patex / Saalschutz: Little Big City / Technopunk
- 2005: Saalschutz / The Dance Inc.: Never Mind The Remix
- 2005: Egotronic / Saalschutz: Luxus
- 2006: Saalschutz / Räuberhöhle: Saalschutz loves Räuberhöhle
