= Andreas H. Jucker =

Swiss linguist

Andreas H. Jucker is a Swiss linguist and academic. He is Professor Emeritus of English Linguistics at the University of Zurich (UZH). Jucker is regarded as one of the pioneers of the field of historical pragmatics and is known for his research on the history of politeness, speech act theory, and the pragmatics of fiction. From 2019 to 2024, Jucker served as the President of the European Society for the Study of English (ESSE).

== Education ==
Jucker studied at the University of Zurich, where he earned his PhD (Dr. phil.) in 1986. His doctoral thesis, a pragmalinguistic analysis of news interviews, was published that same year by John Benjamins. He continued his postdoctoral research at Zurich and completed his Habilitation in 1992. His habilitation thesis on "Social Stylistics: Syntactic Variation in British Newspapers" was published by Mouton de Gruyter.

During his early career, he spent time as a researcher at the University of Cambridge and as a guest professor at Adam Mickiewicz University in Poznań, Poland.

== Academic career ==
In 1992, shortly after his Habilitation, Jucker was appointed Professor of English Linguistics at the Justus Liebig University Giessen in Germany. He held this position for ten years before returning to Switzerland in 2002 to accept the Chair of English Linguistics at the University of Zurich. During his tenure at UZH, he served as Dean of the Faculty of Arts and Social Sciences from 2013 to 2017. He retired in 2022 and currently holds the title of Professor Emeritus.

== Research and contributions ==
Jucker is widely recognized as one of the founding figures of historical pragmatics, a subfield of linguistics that investigates how language use and communicative patterns have evolved over time. He co-founded the Journal of Historical Pragmatics in 2000, which became the central publication for the field.

=== Professional service ===
Jucker has played a significant role in the governance of English studies in Europe:

- President of ESSE: He served as President of the European Society for the Study of English (ESSE) from 2019 to 2024.
- Editorial Roles: He is the Co-Editor-in-Chief of the Journal of Pragmatics (Elsevier) and was the founding editor of the Journal of Historical Pragmatics (John Benjamins).

=== Selected publications ===
Jucker has authored and edited numerous books and articles. His key monographs include:

- News Interviews: A Pragmalinguistic Analysis (John Benjamins, 1986)
- Social Stylistics: Syntactic Variation in British Newspapers (Mouton de Gruyter, 1992)
- History of English and English Historical Linguistics (Klett, 2000)
- Speech Acts in the History of English (with Irma Taavitsainen; John Benjamins, 2008)
- English Historical Pragmatics (with Irma Taavitsainen; Edinburgh University Press, 2013)
- Politeness in the History of English: From the Middle Ages to the Present Day (Cambridge University Press, 2020) It was reviewed in the Journal of Historical Pragmatics as a comprehensive overview of the field.
- The Pragmatics of Fiction (with Miriam Locher; Edinburgh University Press, 2021)
- Speech Acts: Discursive, Multimodal, Diachronic (Cambridge University Press, 2024)
