= Mister X (band) =

Belarusian street punk band from Grodno

- The band's logo

Background information
- Origin: Grodno, Belarus
- Genres: Street punk; Oi!; hardcore punk
- Years active: 2003–2021
- Labels: Street Beat Records; No Pasaran Records; Audiolith Records
- Members: "BanCar" (Igor Bancer); Sapl; Slav
- Website: www.facebook.com/mx.band.69

Mister X are a Belarusian street punk band formed in Grodno, West Belarus, in 2003 by Igor Bancer and Boris of Oi! Bombers. They openly identify as SHARP and belong to the small, but healthy and growing anti-racist skinhead scene in Belarus. They are well known on the underground punk scene in Poland, where they have numerous times been referred to as "the most well-known Belarusian punk rock band" and "the flagship of Belarusian street punk", though they frequently tour other parts of Eastern Europe as well (Russia, Latvia, and Lithuania, among other countries) and have played in Western Europe too. Although most of their work is in Russian, they are also known for singing in Polish, Belarusian, and occasionally English – almost all of their digitally released albums are annotated in Russian, Polish, and English. Their frontman and founder Igor Bancer is of Polish descent. Mister X prides itself in being the first Oi! band in Belarus; their inspirations are: The Analogs (whose songs they have covered in the past), The Business, Oxymoron, The Oppressed, Cock Sparrer, Last Resort, and many more.

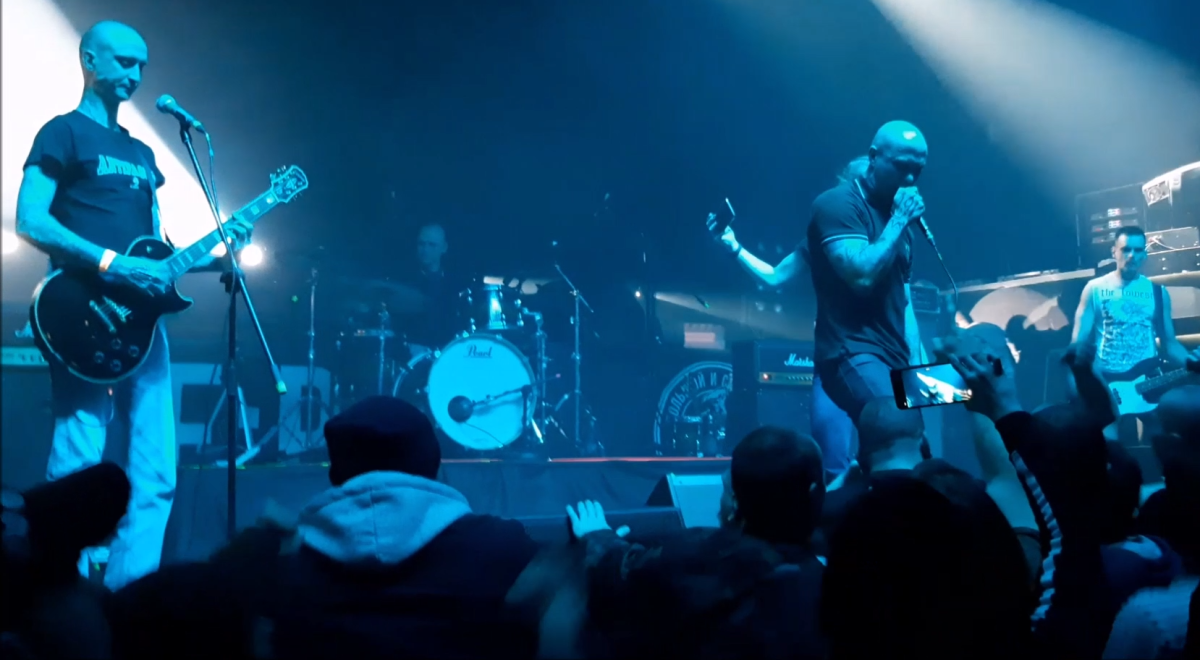
Mister X performing live in Minsk, in March 2020.

As a group they claim to be apolitical and the lyrics of their songs are generally quite subcultural in nature – about having fun, being honest and living life accordingly to your ideals – but all members are committed to anti-fascism and some of them take part in various sports or anarchist initiatives during their free time. They also have a zero tolerance attitude towards racism and recognise the diverse roots of their musical genre. Although Mister X's self-proclaimed apolitical stance initially led to them being somewhat ostracised on the then highly politicised Belarusian punk scene, it has not stopped them from garnering an international following of fans in the years following the band's creation, despite difficulties with the country's regime and travelling. One of their gigs in Ryazan was broken up by the Russian law enforcement under false accusation of drug use, which later led to several cases of police brutality and torture on numerous members of the audience.

At the beginning of 2018, the band released in Germany a split-album with the Russian hardcore band What We Feel. This meant that Mister X became the first Belarusian band signed at a German label. Members of the band, including frontman Igor Bancer, have been involved in the 2020 Belarusian protests against dictator Alexander Lukashenko; Bancer, a long-time activist, was beaten and imprisoned multiple times during this period. In June 2021, due to Igor being sentenced to 1.5 years of penal labour in a correctional facility for protesting, the band was forced to temporarily put its on activity on hold.

== Band members ==
Igor Bancer, one of the founding members of the band, its main vocalist, and generally the group's spokesperson has been with Mister X since their formation. Him and Alex "SlepOi!" Kot, the band's guitarist who also performs the backing vocals, form the core of the group as Mister X's two most long-term members. It is usually these two men that appear in most interviews with the band, often together. Before leaving both bands to be then replaced by Artur, Katya from Messed Up was for a while the drummer of Mister X.

=== Current members ===
- "BanCar" (Igor Bancer) – vocals
- . . . – guitar
- "Sapl" – bass guitar
- Slav – drums

=== Former members ===
- Alex "SlepOi!" Kot – guitar, backing vocals
- Artur "Archie" Lemantovich – drums
- Vadim – bass guitar
- Ekaterina "Katya" Khvostikova – drums
- "Sok" – guitar
- "Siniy" – drums
- "Burik" – bass guitar
- "Pashtet" – bass guitar, backing vocals
- "MalOi!" – drums

== Discography ==
- Punx & Skins Unite & Win (Demo EP) (2005)
- A.C.A.B. (2007)
- Unreleased (2010)
- Anti... Anti... Anti... (2011)
- Не отступай никогда (Never give up / Nie poddawaj się nigdy) (2011)
- ...какими мы стали (Who did we become / Jakimi się staliśmy) (2013)
- До самого конца (Till the end / Do samego końca) (2016)
- What We Feel / Mister X - All Against All - Split (2018)
