= Feine Sahne Fischfilet =

German punk band

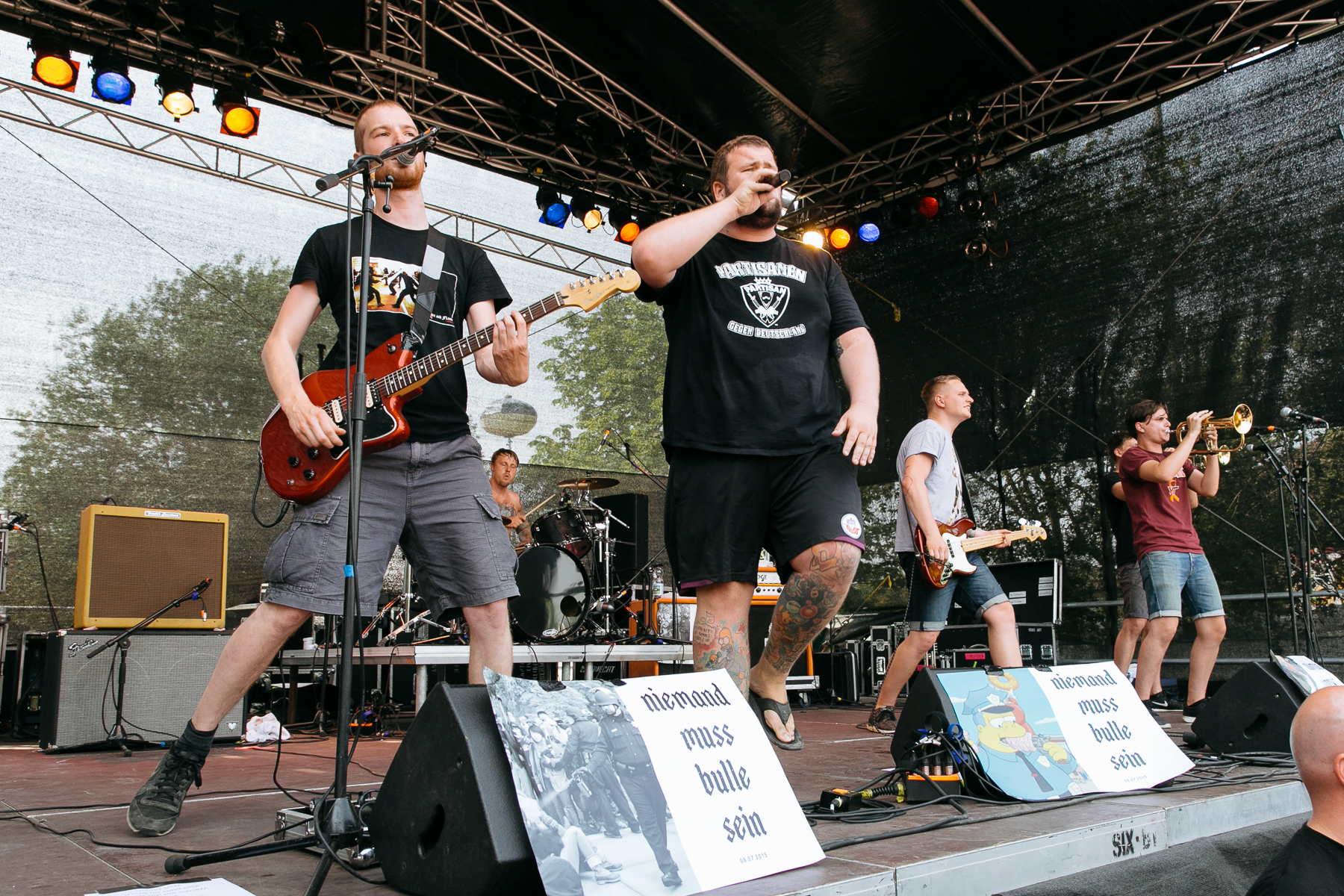
- Feine Sahne Fischfilet performing at Vainstream Rockfest in Münster, Germany, 2015

Background information
- Origin: Rostock, Demmin, Jarmen, Wismar, Greifswald, Loitz, Hanshagen, Mecklenburg-Vorpommern, GER
- Genres: Punk; Ska punk; Indie rock
- Years active: 2004–present
- Labels: Diffidati; Audiolith
- Members: Jan ″Monchi″ Gorkow; Max Bobzin; Kai Irrgang; Olaf Ney; Hauke Segert
- Past members: Christoph Sell; Jacobus North
- Website: feinesahnefischfilet.de

Feine Sahne Fischfilet ("Fine Cream Fish Fillet") is a German punk band formed in 2004 in Mecklenburg-Vorpommern. The band's members are from Jarmen, Greifswald, Rostock, Demmin, Loitz, Hanshagen and Wismar.

The band has officially released five studio albums: Backstage mit Freunden in 2009 and Wut im Bauch, Trauer im Herzen a year later — both released via Diffidati Records —, Scheitern & Verstehen in 2012, Bleiben oder Gehen in 2015 and Sturm & Dreck in 2018 via Audiolith Records. The 2015 released fourth studio album peaked at no. 21 in the German Albums Charts. Sturm & Dreck reached no. 3 in German Albums Charts, no. 12 in the Austrian Albums Charts and no. 30 in the Swiss Albums Charts.

In 2009 the Landeskriminalamt Mecklenburg-Vorpommern (Mecklenburg-West Pomerania State Criminal Police Office) filed a lawsuit before the German federal censorship agency (officially the Federal Department for the Protection of Children and Young People in the Media) against the band arguing the song Staatsgewalt ("Authority of the State") released on their debut record Backstage mit Freunden for potential violent content. The lawsuit was later dismissed. Two years later the band was mentioned in the Verfassungsschutzbericht of Mecklenburg-Vorpommern for having an explicit anti-state attitude. The band was featured in the Verfassungsschutzbericht again a year later.

Feine Sahne Fischfilet played at major music festivals like Rock am Ring and Rock im Park, Hurricane Festival, Southside and Vainstream Rockfest. As a reaction of the protests in Chemnitz the band took part at the free-for-all concert under the moniker #WirSindMehr alongside Die Toten Hosen, Kraftklub, Marteria, Casper and K.I.Z against hate and racism. German president Frank-Walter Steinmeier shared a posting about this concert on his social media and got criticized for supporting left extremists in content of the participation of Feine Sahne Fischfilet.

The band won several prizes like the Preis für Popkultur in 2017 for their campaign Noch nicht komplett im Arsch. Feine Sahne Fischfilet ranked second at the 2013s Courage Prize of the Linksfraktion at the Landtag of Mecklenburg-Vorpommern. Prior to that the band was nominated as Best Newcomer at the VIA! Vut Indie Awards. In 2018 the band was nominated at the Best German Act category at the 2018 MTV Europe Music Awards.

== Discography ==
Year	Title	Peak positions			Label
Year	Title	GER	AUT	SWI	Label
2009	Backstage mit Freunden	—	—	—	Diffidati Records
2010	Wut im Bauch, Trauer im Herzen	—	—	—	Diffidati Records
2012	Scheitern & Verstehen	—	—	—	Audiolith Records
2015	Bleiben oder Gehen	21	—	—	Audiolith Records
2018	Sturm & Dreck	3	12	30	Audiolith Records
2023	Alles glänzt	3	14	11	Plattenweg Tonträger
2025	Wir kommen in Frieden	1	6	11	Plattenweg Tonträger

== Accolades ==
Year	Nominated work	Award	Category	Result	Place	Notes
2012	Feine Sahne Fischfilet	VIA! Vut Indie Awards	Best Newcomer	Nominated	—	
2013	Feine Sahne Fischfilet	Courage Prize of the Linksfraktion at the Landtag of Mecklenburg-Vorpommern	–	Won	2nd	
2017	Noch nicht komplett im Arsch	Preis für Popkultur	Most exciting Idea/Campaign	Nominated	—	
2018	Feine Sahne Fischfilet	MTV Europe Music Awards	Best German Act	Nominated	—	

== Band members ==
Current members

- Kai Irrgang – bass (2004–present)
- Jan ″Monchi″ Gorkow – lead vocals (2006–present)
- Olaf Ney – drums (2008–present)
- Max Bobzin – trumpet, backing vocals (2009–present)
- Hauke – guitar, lead vocals (2022–present)

Former members

- Ahl – drums (2004–2008)
- Danny – guitar, lead vocals (2004–2009)
- Tillmann – trumpet (2008–2009)
- Christoph Sell – guitar, lead vocals (2009–2022)
- Jacobus North – trumpet, backing vocals (2010–2022)

== Trivia ==
- Several members, including vocalist Jan Gorkow are part of the FC Hansa Rostock fan scene.
- The song Ostrava was dedicated to the FC Hansa fan scene; Keine Träne describes the estrangement of the fan scene.
- Vocalist Jan Gorkow had to face a lawsuit because he was accused to be involved in a confrontation with a neo nazi. He was later acquitted by the court.
- Charly Hübner directed the documentary movie Wildes Herz which is about the band.
- In 2017 originally comedian Jan Böhmermann was receiving the VUT Indie Award but he didn't attend the Awards ceremony. Feine Sahne Fischfilet were declared as winner afterwards. Böhmermann and the band's members auctioned the prize on eBay and donated that money to Jugend rettet, an organization which helps rescuing refugees in the Mediterranean Sea.
- Jan Gorkow is involved in the campaign MV for Kobane.
- In October 2016, Jan Gorkow was part of TV show ″Applaus und raus!″ on Pro Sieben moderated by stand-up comedian Oliver Polak.
