= Anders Bæksgaard =

Danish journalist

- Education: Roskilde University
- Occupation: Journalist

Anders Bæksgaard is a Danish journalist and the current political editor at the newspaper Politiken.

== Biography ==
Anders Bæksgaard enrolled at Roskilde University in 2007 from where he obtained a master's degree in 2015. From 2011 he worked for Berlingskes Nyhedsbureau. After completing his education, he assumed a position as political journalist at Berlingske on 1 February 2014. He succeeded Jesper Thobo-Carlsen as political editor at Politiken on 16 August 2016.
