= Mediengruppe Telekommander =

Austrian/German electronic band

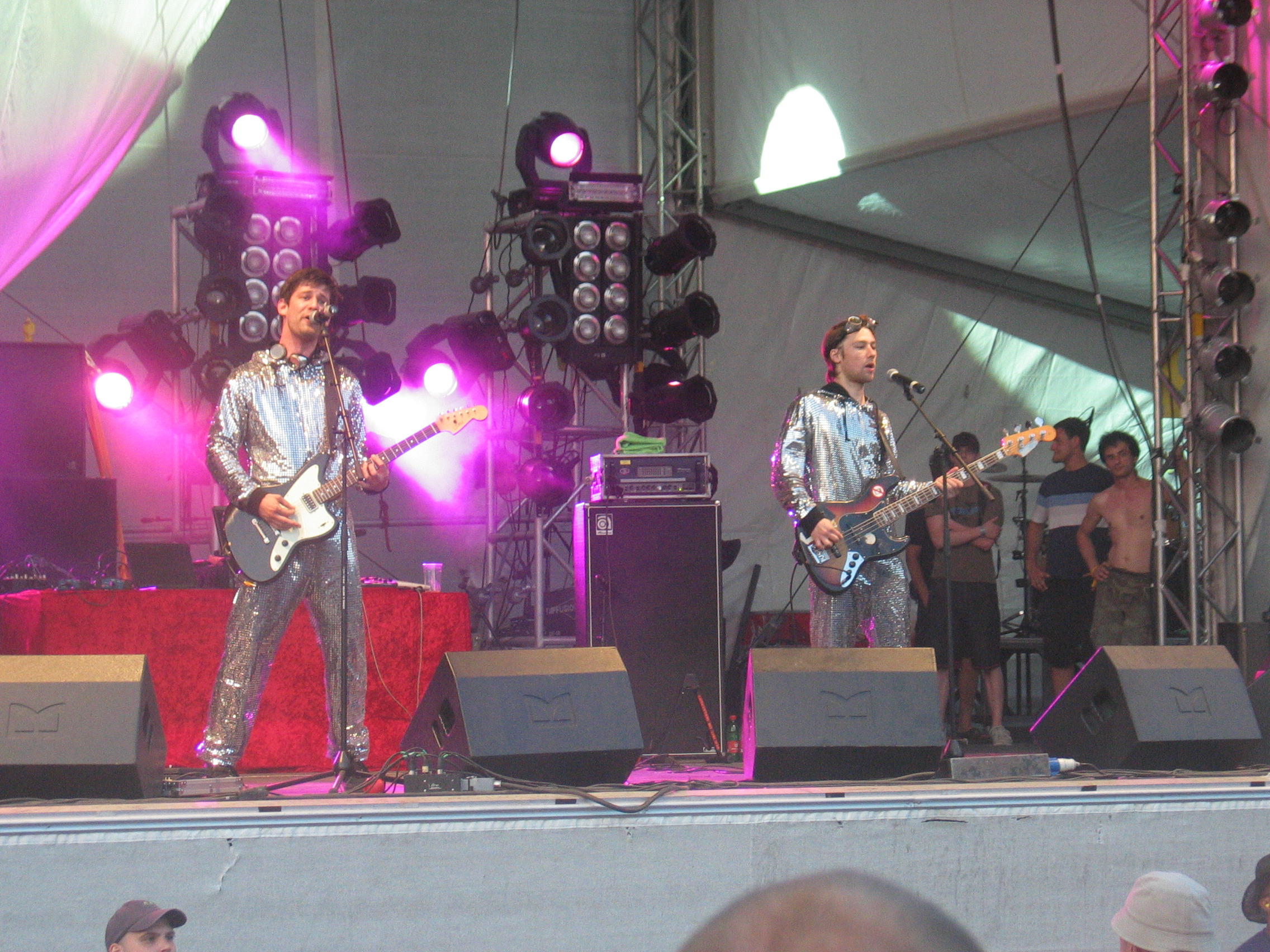
Mediengruppe Telekommander performing live at the Donauinselfest 2006 festival on the Danube Island in Vienna, Austria, on June 25, 2006

Mediengruppe Telekommander, founded in 2001 by Florian Zwietnig and Gerald Mandl, was an Austrian/German electronic band. Since 2002, they have gained considerable attention in the media of Germany and Austria.

The band depicts and criticizes today's consumerist culture with harsh lyrics and their distinctive fusion of indie, punk rock, hip hop, and electronic music.

In February 2012, the duo played their farewell concert in Berlin before separating.

== Discography ==
- EP 1 (vinyl single 2002)
- EP 2 (vinyl single 2003)
- Trend (single 2004)
- Die ganze Kraft einer Kultur (2004)
- Bis zum Erbrechen schreien (single 2004)
- Sprengkörper (12" club single 2006)
- Näher am Menschen (2006)
- Endlosrille (single 2009)
- Einer muss in Führung gehen (single 2009)
- Einer muss in Führung gehen (2009)
- Deine Schule (Single) (2011)
- Die Elite der Nächstenliebe (Album) (2011)
- Billig (Single) (2011)
