= Igor Bancer =

Polish Belarusian musician

- Ігар Банцэр
- Bancer performing live in Minsk, March 2020
- Born: Igor Bancer; 24 February 1980 (age 46); Minsk, Byelorussian SSR, Soviet Union
- Occupations: Singer; Songwriter; Activist; Journalist; Manual labourer
- Spouse: Anżalika Orechwo
- Musical career
- Genres: Punk rock; Street punk; Hardcore punk
- Instrument: Vocals
- Years active: 2003–present
- Label: Street Beat Records
- Member of: Mister X
- Website: bancer.by mx-band.by

Igor Ramanovich Bancer (Belarusian: Ігар Рaманaвіч Банцэр; Polish: Igor Ramanowicz Bancer; Russian: Игорь Романович Банцер) is a Polish Belarusian musician, opposition figure, and former political prisoner. He is the former editor-in-chief of the Magazyn Polski and of the Głos znad Niemna ("Voice from over the Neman") in exile as well as the former spokesperson of the Union of Poles in Belarus. Bancer is perhaps best known as the founder and singer of the Grodno-based streetpunk band Mister X, though he also served as head of the "Grodno Rock-club".

== Life and career ==
=== Childhood and studies ===
Born in Minsk, then largest city in the Byelorussian SSR and now the capital of the Republic of Belarus, Igor moved with his family to Grodno in 1986. There he attended school number 25 (it is customary in Eastern Europe to name primary schools with numbers). In 1997 he became a member of the Малады Фронт organisation; in the same year he began working as a journalist for the "Пагоня" newspaper. From 1997 until 2002, Bancer lived in Warszawa – capital of Poland – where he studied international relations at the local university. During his stay in Poland he actively took part in efforts to promote the democratisation of Belarus, cooperating with Belarusian political migrants and the Helsinki Foundation for Human Rights. After returning to Belarus he worked as a journalist for several Russian language opposition magazines. Igor was also editor-in-chief of the Polish-language monthly publication Magazyn Polski in 2007.

=== Musical career ===
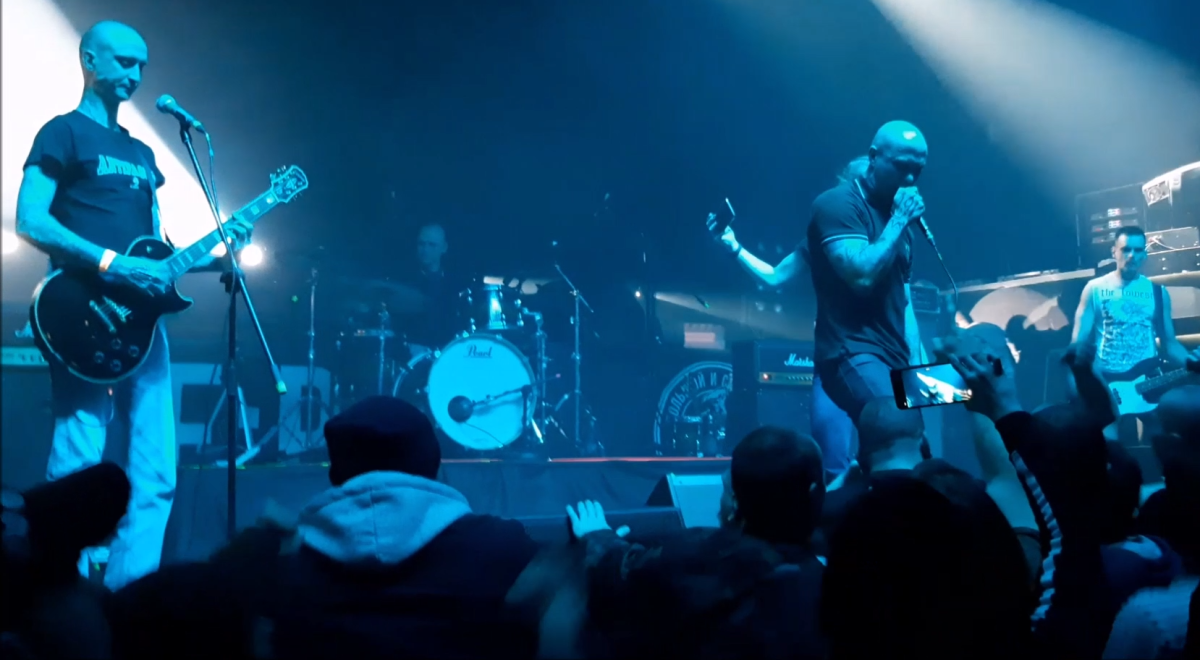
Mister X performing live in Minsk, in March 2020.

Ever since 2003, he founded the Mister X streetpunk band when with Boris from Oi! Bombers, and has been the group's primary vocalist.

The whole band, including Igor, identify as SHARP and form part of the anti-racist skinhead and Oi! scene in West Belarus. Partially thanks to Bancer's fluency in Polish, Mister X have become well known on the underground punk scene in Poland, where they are often referred to as "the most well-known Belarusian punk rock band" and "the flagship of Belarusian street punk".

Since their formation, the band have toured with Igor in many European countries outside of their usual venues of Belarus, Poland, Russia, Latvia, and Lithuania – including Germany and other Western European countries. Depending on the song, Igor writes his lyrics and records his vocals in Russian, Polish, English, or Belarusian.

Although Igor and his band's self-proclaimed apolitical stance initially led to them being somewhat ostracised on the then highly politicised Belarusian punk scene, it has not gotten in the way of garnering an international following of fans in the years following the band's creation, despite difficulties with the country's regime and travelling. The band and their fans have also experienced police brutality and repressions at the hands of the local authorities during one of their gigs in Ryazan, Russia.

=== Activism (2007-2015) ===
Due to his critical stance of opposition towards the authoritarian regime of Alexander Lukashenko, which involves political and social activism on his part, Bancer has been imprisoned and punished by the Belarusian law enforcement numerous times. In March 2007 he was arrested and convicted for "swearing in the presence of militiamen", which resulted in his imprisonment for a period of 10 days and he was yet again stopped in October of the same year. Andżelika Borys stood in his defence, which resulted in her conviction and being charged with a fine. In the following years of 2008, 2009, and 2010, Igor was stopped several times by the militsiya of Belarus – often arrested and sometimes charged with criminal offences, mostly for his reluctance to accept state authority and insistence on protest; at one point in 2010 he went on a hunger strike.

On the morning of 14 June 2011, Bancer was stopped by the militsiya in front of his home in Grodno. In this way he was prevented from making his way to the local courtroom to attend the process of Andrzej Poczobut. For the remainder of the day he was held in solitary confinement. The following day he was convicted to 5 days of arrest and charged for "uncensurable vocabulary". His case was considered in the police building instead of the courts. Under arrest, as a sign of protest, he refused all food and liquids, which resulted in rapid weight loss of 8 kilograms; he was also for a period of time held in an overcrowded cell.

Yet again on 24 June 2011, Igor was brutally stopped by the local authorities, as the militiamen dragged him across the street, for "being in a forbidden place". His process was once again considered in a militia building rather than a proper courtroom. He was accused of "loud swearing in public" and "refusing to submit himself to the militsiya". The case against him was shown by Bancer as being inconsistent, since according to the police he was in 2 places at the same time – his innocence was confirmed by numerous witnesses. Regardless and contrary to the facts, the judge charged him a fine of 2,100,000 rubels (then equal to more than 1,000 Polish złoty). According to Grażyna Szałkiewicz, who gave testimony of Igor's innocence, the judge raised her voice and behaved aggressively towards her and the defence.

In early July 2011, Bancer was arrested and charged the following day for "taking part in an illegal gathering on the 28th of June"; this resulted in a conviction and 10 days of arrest. He once again decided to go on a hunger strike in response to his unfair treatment. On 1 June, in 2012, Igor was stopped and arrested for 13 days after picketing in defence of the Polish School in Grodno. Since 2015, after receiving intimidating phone-calls from the militsiya with threats of forced expulsion from the country, Bancer has been focusing more on pursuing his musical calling while making ends meet.

=== 2020 protests and 2021/2022 sentencing ===
When the 2020 Belarusian protests escalated following the publication of falsified election results on the evening of 9 August 2020, police forces reportedly actively looked for Igor and detained him once he was found. Immediately after being incarcerated, Igor started a hunger strike. Initially his wife and friends, as well as his lawyer, were unable to establish contact with him due to a lack of information from the authorities. He was beaten twice during his time in arrest, but eventually released after 72 hours in detention. As the protests continued in Grodno, all opposition gatherings were eventually outlawed; on 24 August, Bancer was arrested alongside other anarchist and antifascist demonstrators for taking part in peaceful protest. He was given 10 days of arrest, while his peers were given 7, and once again initiated a hunger strike.

Although he was released following the 10 days, police officers came to Bancer's house late on the evening of 20 October to arrest him yet again. This time his apartment was searched and his notebook was seized as well. What set this incident apart from the others was that the local authorities followed it up with disinformation, claiming that Igor showed his genitals to law enforcement as part of his performance protest in front of the police station; a recording from the incident shows him only lowering his trousers to reveal a thong and no frontal nudity could be seen at all. This fabrication was used in conjunction with Bancer's activism to charge him with hooliganism, which according to Belarusian law threatened him with imprisonment for up to 3 years.

Igor was kept in custody until and throughout his trial, which began on 3 March 2021; starting on that day he spent 16 days on a dry hunger strike, refusing all food and liquids. Amnesty International and other worldwide organisations took an interest in his case. On 15 March 2021, nine organisations, including the Viasna Human Rights Centre, the Belarusian Association of Journalists, the Belarusian Helsinki Committee, made a joint statement and recognized him as a political prisoner. The trial's progress was repeatedly artificially delayed, while Bancer's life was on the line. On 16 March 2021, the patronage over the political prisoner was taken by Rasmus Andresen, Member of the European Parliament. Although he was temporarily freed after sentencing, his life-threatening condition induced by the dry hunger strike left him in need of hospitalisation. Ultimately, he was sentenced to 1.5 years of penal labour in a restricted freedom colony in Vitebsk at the other end of Belarus, which began on 17 June 2021 in Open correctional facility No. 9.

Bancer was finally released on 17 December 2021 after spending the last 22 days of his sentence in solitary confinement; during his time imprisoned in Vitebsk he spent a total of 82 days isolated from other inmates.

On 4 August 2022 the front door to Bancer's apartment in Grodno was broken down and the musician abducted by the Belarusian militsiya. Pro-Lukashenko channels then released a video of Igor criticising the Belarusian opposition and claiming that he would never live in Poland as "he loves Belarus" and out of love for it is "even ready to withstand the hardships associated with staying in a Belarusian prison". His whereabouts were unknown for a week after the arrest until his friend, fellow musician Fyodor Zhyvalievski, revealed that he had visited Igor Bancer in Minsk, where he was being held. Bancer was kept in isolation for 15 days and then another 15 days of imprisonment were added; a number of accusations were made against him, including that of disseminating "extremist materials".

=== Back to Poland ===
In October 2022, after years of repression from the regime of Alexander Lukashenko, Igor Bancer moved to Poland and his band Mister X regrouped there with a new lineup not long after; they were active in Warsaw, which became a refuge for many Belarusian dissidents and activists who had to flee their homes amidst the protests. On 27 April 2023, Bancer was detained by the police and forcibly placed in a psychiatric hospital. He claimed that he had been profiled due to his appearance and unjustly arrested. At the start of June of the same year, he was released from the hospital with a diagnosis of bipolar affective disorder.

For some time, Bancer lived at one of the squats in the Śródmieście central district of Warsaw but he was eventually expelled from there. On 26 July 2024, Bancer entered the Ministry of Family, Labour and Social Policy with a bag that contained pepper spray, a knife, a telescopic baton, and possibly an electroshock weapon. Although he behaved in a calm manner, made no threats, and left his bag at security, the staff eventually called the police – leading to the evacuation of 150 people from the building and Igor Bancer's detention. By 23 July 2024, Belarusian media reported that Bancer was houseless and sleeping at a homeless shelter in Warsaw.

== Personal life ==
Igor is a committed anti-fascist with a zero tolerance attitude towards racism in the skinhead scene, recognising the multi-cultural and ethnically diverse roots of his musical genre; likewise, he is an outspoken opponent of homophobia and sexism in punk rock and wider society. He does not eat meat and does not drink alcohol, his personal interests besides punk and rock music include: MMA, Muay Thai, and Rugby. Bancer has been married twice and has three children – one from the first marriage and two from the second. He was married to Polish-Belarusian activist Anżalika Arechwa, (Note: Her name can be rendered as Анжаліка Арэхва (or Anżalika Arechwa) in Belarusian, Anżelika Orechwo in Polish, and Анжелика Орехво in Russian.) with whom he has two children. While his lifestyle in many ways could be seen as straight edge, Igor does not seem to openly identify as such. He is an agnostic.
