= Heinrich-Schmidt-Barrien-Preis =

Heinrich-Schmidt-Barrien-Preis is a literary prize of Germany awarded for the preservation of Low German.
