= Jeanette Gundel =

American linguist (1942–2019)

- Born: July 16, 1942; Kraków, Poland
- Died: November 8, 2019 (aged 77); Minneapolis, Minnesota, US

Academic background
- Education: University of Texas at Austin (PhD)
- Thesis: The Role of Topic and Comment in Linguistic Theory (1974)

Academic work
- Discipline: Linguist
- Sub-discipline: Information structure; Pragmatics
- Institutions: University of Minnesota

Jeanette (Kohn) Gundel (July 16, 1942 – November 8, 2019) was an American linguist noted for her work on information structure and pragmatics.

== Academic career ==
Gundel received her PhD in Linguistics from the University of Texas at Austin, in 1974. Her dissertation, "The Role of Topic and Comment in Linguistic Theory", was published in 1977 by the Indiana University Linguistics Club, and in 1988, in the Outstanding Dissertations in Linguistics Series by Garland.

After having taught at the Ohio State University (1974–1977) and the University of Hawaii at Manoa (1978–1980), Gundel joined the Department of Linguistics at the University of Minnesota in 1980 and became Full Professor there in 1992. She was Head of the academic program in Linguistics from 1999 to 2016, and served as the Director of the Institute of Linguistics from 2010 to 2016. She served as the Director of Graduate Studies in Linguistics from 1991 to 1997 and from 2001 to 2012.

== Research ==
Gundel's research focused primarily on the interface between linguistic theory and pragmatics. Her work was widely published and widely cited. Her foundational 1993 Language paper with Nancy Hedberg and Ron Zacharski, "Cognitive Status and the Form of Referring Expression in Discourse," established the Givenness Hierarchy, a concept that has become crucial not only in linguistics, but also in the domains of psychology and computer science. This paper was included in The Language Anthology, Volume III, The Best of Language 1986–2016, a compilation of the most influential articles published in the history of the journal.

In addition to her publications as author, Gundel co-edited major volumes on reference, including The Oxford Handbook of Reference, published by Oxford University Press in 2019.

A festschrift in her honor was published by John Benjamins in 2007.

== Selected works ==
- Fretheim, Thorstein and Jeanette Gundel, eds. 1996. Reference and referent accessibility. Amsterdam: John Benjamins.
- Gundel, Jeanette K. 1988. Universals of topic-comment structure. In Studies in Syntactic Typology. Amsterdam: John Benjamins, 209–242.
- Gundel, Jeanette K. and Barbara Abbott, eds. 2019. The Oxford Handbook of Reference. Oxford University Press.
- Gundel, Jeanette K. and Thorstein Fretheim. 2003. Information structure. In Handbook of Pragmatics. Amsterdam: John Benjamins.
- Gundel, Jeanette K. and Thorstein Fretheim. 2006. Topic and focus. In Handbook of Pragmatics. Blackwell Publishing Company, pp. 175–196.
- Gundel, Jeanette K. and Nancy Hedberg, eds. 2008. Reference: Interdisciplinary Perspectives. Oxford University Press.
- Gundel, Jeanette K., Nancy Hedberg and Ron Zacharski. 1993. Cognitive status and the form of referring expressions in discourse. Language 69, 274–307.
