= Maj-Britt Mosegaard Hansen =

Linguist

Maj-Britt Mosegaard Hansen is a linguist and Professor of French Language and Linguistics at the University of Manchester, UK.

== Biography ==
Hansen studied at the University of Copenhagen, where she received an MA (Cand.mag.) in 1992, a PhD in 1996 (dissertation title: The Function of Discourse Particles: A Study with Special Reference to Spoken Standard French), and a higher doctorate in 2008 (Particles at the Semantics/Pragmatics Interface: Synchronic and Diachronic Issues). On completion of her PhD she took up an assistant professorship at the same university, and was promoted to associate professor in 2000.

In 2007 she moved to the University of Manchester to take up her current position as Professor of French Language and Linguistics. She was elected Fellow of the Royal Danish Academy of Sciences and Letters in 2013, and Member of the Academia Europaea in 2020.

== Research ==
Maj-Britt Mosegaard Hansen's research falls within the broad areas of semantics and pragmatics, from both a synchronic and a diachronic perspective, with the French language as primary empirical domain. Research areas include verbal interaction, functional and cognitive linguistics, differences between spoken and written French, and Peircean semiotics. Her early work focused especially on discourse particles/markers, and she has also worked extensively on the pragmatics of negation and Jespersen's Cycle. She is currently editor of Brill's Studies in Pragmatics series, and coordinator of an international network on the role of pragmatics in cyclic language change.

== Selected publications ==
=== Academic ===
- Hansen, Maj-Britt Mosegaard. 1997. Alors and donc in spoken French: a reanalysis. Journal of Pragmatics 28(2), 153–187.
- Hansen, Maj-Britt Mosegaard. 1998. The function of discourse particles: a study with special reference to spoken standard French. Amsterdam/Philadelphia: John Benjamins. ISBN 9789027250667
- Hansen, Maj-Britt Mosegaard. 1998. The semantic status of discourse markers. Lingua 104(3-4), 235–260.
- Hansen, Maj-Britt Mosegaard, and Corinne Rosari. 2005. The evolution of pragmatic markers. Journal of Historical Pragmatics 6(2), 177–349.
- Hansen, Maj-Britt Mosegaard, and Jacqueline Visconti (eds.). 2007. Current Trends in Diachronic Semantics and Pragmatics. Leiden: Brill. ISBN 9781849506779
- Hansen, Maj-Britt Mosegaard. 2008. Particles at the semantics/pragmatics interface: Synchronic and diachronic issues. A study with special reference to the French phasal adverbs. Leiden: Brill. ISBN 9780080552934
- Hansen, Maj-Britt Mosegaard, and Jacqueline Visconti (eds.). 2014. The diachrony of negation. Amsterdam/Philadelphia: John Benjamins. ISBN 9789027259257

=== General audience ===
- The structure of modern standard French: a student grammar. Oxford: Oxford University Press. 2016. ISBN 978-0-19-872374-5.
