= Intercultural Pragmatics =

- Discipline: Pragmatics
- Language: English
- Edited by: István Kecskés

Publication details
- History: 2004–present
- Publisher: Mouton de Gruyter (Germany)
- Frequency: Quarterly

Standard abbreviations
- ISO 4: Intercult. Pragmat.

Indexing
- ISSN: 1612-295X (print); 1613-365X (web)
- OCLC no.: 57359121

Links
- Journal homepage

Intercultural Pragmatics is a peer-reviewed academic journal published quarterly by Mouton de Gruyter. It covers both theoretical and practical aspects of pragmatics in an intercultural context, aiming at promoting discussion among researchers within different disciplines, such as theoretical and applied linguistics, psychology and communication studies.

The journal was established in 2004. The current editor-in-chief is István Kecskés (University at Albany, SUNY).
