= Journal of Pragmatics =

- Discipline: Pragmatics
- Language: English
- Edited by: Anne Bezuidenhout, Andreas H. Jucker

Publication details
- History: 1977–present
- Publisher: Elsevier
- Frequency: Monthly
- Impact factor: 1.86 (2021)

Standard abbreviations
- ISO 4: J. Pragmat.

Indexing
- ISSN: 0378-2166
- LCCN: 77641972
- OCLC no.: 3197305

Links
- Journal homepage; Online archive

The Journal of Pragmatics is a monthly peer-reviewed academic journal covering the linguistic subfield of pragmatics. It was established in 1977 by Jacob L. Mey (at that time Odense University) and Hartmut Haberland (Roskilde University). The current Editors-in-Chief are Stavros Assimakopoulos (University of Malta) and Andreas H. Jucker (University of Zurich). Previous editors-in-chief include Anne Bezuidenhout (University of South Carolina; 2021-2024) Marina Terkourafi (Leiden University; 2017–2021), Michael Haugh (The University of Queensland; 2015–2020), Neal R. Norrick (Saarland University; 2010–2016) and Jonathan Culpeper (Lancaster University; 2009–2014). According to Journal Citation Reports, the journal has a 2024 impact factor of 1.7.
