= István Kecskés =

Linguistics researcher (1947–2025)

- Born: 20 September 1947; Miskolc, Hungary
- Died: 24 February 2025 (aged 77); Shanghai, China
- Education: University of Debrecen
- Known for: Pragmatics
- Spouse: Tünde Papp
- Children: 2
- Scientific career
- Fields: Pragmatics
- Workplaces: State University of New York
- Website: Kecskés on the website of State University of New York

István Kecskés (20 September 1947 – 24 February 2025) was a Hungarian-born American linguist and academic who worked at the State University of New York, USA. He taught graduate courses in pragmatics, second language acquisition and bilingualism at SUNY, Albany. He was the President of the American Pragmatics Association (AMPRA) and the CASLAR (Chinese as a Second Language Research) Association. He was the founder and co-director of the Barcelona Summer School on Bi- and Multilingualism (until 2016), and the founder and co-director of Sorbonne, Paris – SUNY, Albany Graduate Student Symposium.

== Background ==
István Kecskés was born in Miskolc, Hungary on 20 September 1947. He got his PhD in comparative linguistics from Kossuth University (now Debrecen University), Debrecen, Hungary in 1977 and an academic degree from the Hungarian Academy of Sciences in 1986.

From 1989, Kecskés lived and worked in the United States, where he was a Distinguished Professor at SUNY Albany. He died on 24 February 2025, at the age of 77.

== Research ==
Kecskés’ book “Foreign language and mother tongue” co-authored by his wife Dr. Tünde Papp and published by Erlbaum in 2000 was the first book that described the effect of the second language on the first language based on a longitudinal research. In his book “Situation-Bound Utterances in L1 and L2” (De Gruyter, 2003) he introduced the notion of SBU. Kecskés’ book “Intercultural Pragmatics” (Oxford University Press, 2014) is considered a groundbreaking monograph that shapes research in the field. Some of his books like “Explorations in Chinese as a Second Language” (Springer 2017) and “Key Issues in Chinese as a Second Language (Routledge 2017) contributed significantly to research in Chinese as a Second Language. His new monograph titled “English as a Lingua Franca: The pragmatic perspective” was published by Cambridge University Press in 2019. Kecskés is considered to be the founder of the sub-field “intercultural pragmatics” and promoter of the socio-cognitive approach with its dynamic model of meaning that combines the intention-based, pragmatic view of cooperation with the cognitive view of egocentrism to incorporate emerging features of communication. His contribution to pragmatics, linguistics, bilingualism and second language acquisition was recognized by his peers in a Festschrift volume for his 70th birthday, “Doing pragmatics interculturally” edited by Rachel Giora and Michael Haugh and published by De Gruyter in 2017.

== Editorial work ==
Kecskés was the founding editor of the journal “Intercultural Pragmatics” (De Gruyter), the “Mouton Series in Pragmatics”, the bilingual (Chinese-English) journal “CASLAR (Chinese as a Second Language Research)” and the co-founding editor of “Journal of Language Aggression and Conflict” published by John Benjamins (co-founder Pilar Garces Blitvich).

== Awards ==
Kecskés received a Senior Fellowship from the Rockefeller Foundation in the Rockefeller Research Center in Bellagio, Italy in 2004, a Senior Fellowship from the Mitteleuropa Foundation, Bolzano, Italy in 2005, an Honorary Professorship from Zhejiang University, Hangzhou in 2009, a Yunshan Chair Professorship from Guangdong University of Foreign Studies, Guangzhou, China in 2011, a Distinguished Visiting Professorship from Monash University, Melbourne, Australia in 2013 and a Guest Professorship from the University of Messina in May 2017 and May 2019. He was the recipient of the Chancellor's Excellence in Research Award of State University of New York in 2014. He had been an Honorary Professor at the National Research Tomsk State University, Russia since 2015 where a Graduate Student Award and Scholarship was named after him in 2016.

== Selected bibliography ==
=== Books ===
Kecskes, Istvan. (ed.) 2022. Cambridge Handbook of Intercultural Pragmatics. Cambridge: Cambridge University Press.

Kecskes Istvan. 2019. English as a Lingua Franca: The pragmatic perspective. Cambridge: Cambridge University Press.

Kecskes, Istvan. 2017. Explorations into Chinese as a Second Language. Cham: Springer.

Kecskes, Istvan and Chaofen Sun (eds.) 2017. Key issues in Chinese as a Second Language Research. London: Routledge.

Kecskes, Istvan. 2014. Intercultural Pragmatics. Oxford, UK: Oxford University Press.

Kecskes, I. &amp; Jesus Romero-Trillo. (eds.) 2013. Research Trends in Intercultural Pragmatics. Berlin/Boston: Mouton de Gruyter.

Kecskes, I. and Laurence Horn. 2007. Explorations in Pragmatics: Linguistic, Cognitive and Intercultural Aspects. Berlin/New York: Mouton.

Kecskes, Istvan and Liliana Albertazzi (eds.) 2007. Cognitive Aspects of Bilingualism. Heidelberg: London: Springer.

Kecskes, Istvan. 2003. Situation-Bound Utterances in L1 and L2. Berlin/New York: Mouton de Gruyter.

Kecskes, Istvan - Papp, Tünde. 2000. Foreign Language and Mother Tongue. Mahwah, NJ: Lawrence Erlbaum.

Articles

Kecskes, I. 2022. The role of context in English as a Lingua Franca. In K. Bolton (Ed.), The Wiley-Blackwell Encyclopedia of World Englishes. Oxford: Wiley-Blackwell.

Kecskes, I. 2022. The Socio-cognitive Approach as a Theoretical Frame for Intercultural Pragmatics. In Kecskes, I. Cambridge Handbook of Intercultural Pragmatics. Chapter 4. Cambridge: CUP.

Kecskes, I. 2021. Processing implicatures in English as a Lingua Franca communication. LINGUA. Vol. 256.

Kecskes, I. 2021. Intercultural communication and our understanding of language. Communication. LANGAGES. 222. pp. 25–42. (publisher Paris: Armand Colin).

Kecskes, I. 2020. Linguistic Creativity in English as a Lingua Franca," Studies in Pragmatics (The Pragmatics Society of Japan), Vol. 22, 1–13.

Kecskes, I. 2019. Impoverished pragmatics? The semantics-pragmatics interface from an intercultural perspective. Intercultural Pragmatics. Vol. 16. No. 5: 489–517.

Kecskes, I. and M. Kirner-Ludwig. 2019. Odd structures in English as a Lingua Franca discourse. Journal of Pragmatics. Volume 151, October 2019, Pages 76–90.

Kecskes, I., Robert E. Sanders and Anita Pomerantz. 2017. The basic interactional competence of language learners. Journal of Pragmatics. Vol. 124: 88–105.

Kecskes, I. 2017. Context-sensitivity in intercultural impoliteness. Journal of Politeness Research. Vol. 13. No. 1: 7-33.

Kecskes, I. 2015. Intracultural communication and intercultural communication: Are they different? International Review of Pragmatics. Vol. 7: 171–194.

Kecskes, I. 2015. How does pragmatic competence develop in bilinguals? International Journal of Multilingualism. Vol. 12. No. 4: 419–434.

Kecskes, I. 2010. Situation-Bound Utterances as Pragmatic Acts. Journal of Pragmatics. Vol. 42. No. 11: 2889–2897.

Kecskes, I. 2010. Dual and Multilanguage Systems. International Journal of Multilingualism. Vol.7. No. 2: 1–19.

Kecskes, I. 2010. The paradox of communication: A socio-cognitive approach. Pragmatics &amp; Society. Vol. 1. No. 1: 50–73

Kecskes, I. & F. Zhang. 2009. Activating, seeking and creating common ground: A socio-cognitive approach. Pragmatics &amp; Cognition. Vol. 17. No. 2: 331–355.

Kecskes, I. 2008. Dueling context: A dynamic model of meaning. Journal of Pragmatics. Vol. 40. Issue 3: 385–406.
