= Audiolith Records =

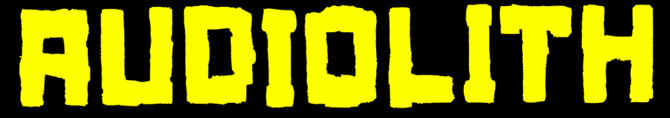
- Founded: 2003
- Founder: Lars Lewerenz
- Distributor(s): BROKEN SILENCE Independent Distribution GmbH, Hamburg
- Genre: Electronic music, electronic rock, indie rock, electropop
- Country of origin: Germany
- Location: Hamburg
- Official website: Audiolith Records

Audiolith Records is a German Independent record label from Bahrenfeld, Hamburg, which publishes mainly Electronic music and Indie rock. While the bands under the label have varied musical styles, the label's main focus is on Electropunk, where it has developed significant influence on the German music scene.

== History ==
Audiolith Records was founded in 2003 by Lars Lewerenz, who had worked for Dim Mak Records before and had been an active member of the band Dos Stilettos. The label's first publication was the 7" Single Both Sides Of The Ocean by The Dance Inc.. Later on, the label started to publish the bands Der Tante Renate, Egotronic, Plemo, and Saalschutz. The artists of Audiolith Records are mainly from Germany (especially from Hamburg) but there is also one band from California (Innaway).

== Artists ==
- Aosuke
- Bondage Fairies
- Brazed
- Captain Capa
- Captain Gips
- ClickClickDecker
- Dadajugend Polyform
- Der Tante Renate
- Egotronic
- Feine Sahne Fischfilet
- Findus
- Frittenbude
- Fuck Art, Let’s Dance!
- Fuzz Galaxy Buzz
- Gimmix
- Innaway
- Kraftklub
- Ira Atari
- Johnny Mauser
- Joney
- Kalipo
- Kobito
- Krink
- Mendoza
- Messed Up
- Mister X
- Neonschwarz
- Miki Mikron
- Nagel
- Okma & Relups
- Rampue
- Saalschutz
- Treiber
- Trouble Orchestra
- Tubbe
- ULTRNX
- Waving the Guns
