= Roskilde University =

Danish public university

- Roskilde Universitet
- Motto: In tranquillo mors - in fluctu vita (Latin)
- Motto in English: In silence, death; in the surge, life
- Type: Public
- Established: 1972; 54 years ago
- Affiliations: EUA, UArctic
- Budget: DKK 774,956,000 ($ 117,100,005) (2014)
- Rector: Hanne Leth Andersen
- Academic staff: 538 (2014)
- Administrative staff: 402 (2014)
- Students: 8045 (2014)
- Undergraduates: 4751 (2014)
- Postgraduates: 3294 (2014)
- Doctoral students: 299 (2014)
- Location: Roskilde, Denmark; 55°39′10″N 12°08′25″E
- Campus: Trekroner, Roskilde
- Website: ruc.dk

Roskilde University (Danish: Roskilde Universitet, abbreviated RUC or RU) is a Danish public university founded in 1972 and located in Trekroner in the Eastern part of Roskilde. The university awards bachelor's degrees, master's degrees, and PhD degrees in a wide variety of subjects within social sciences, the humanities, and natural sciences.

== History ==
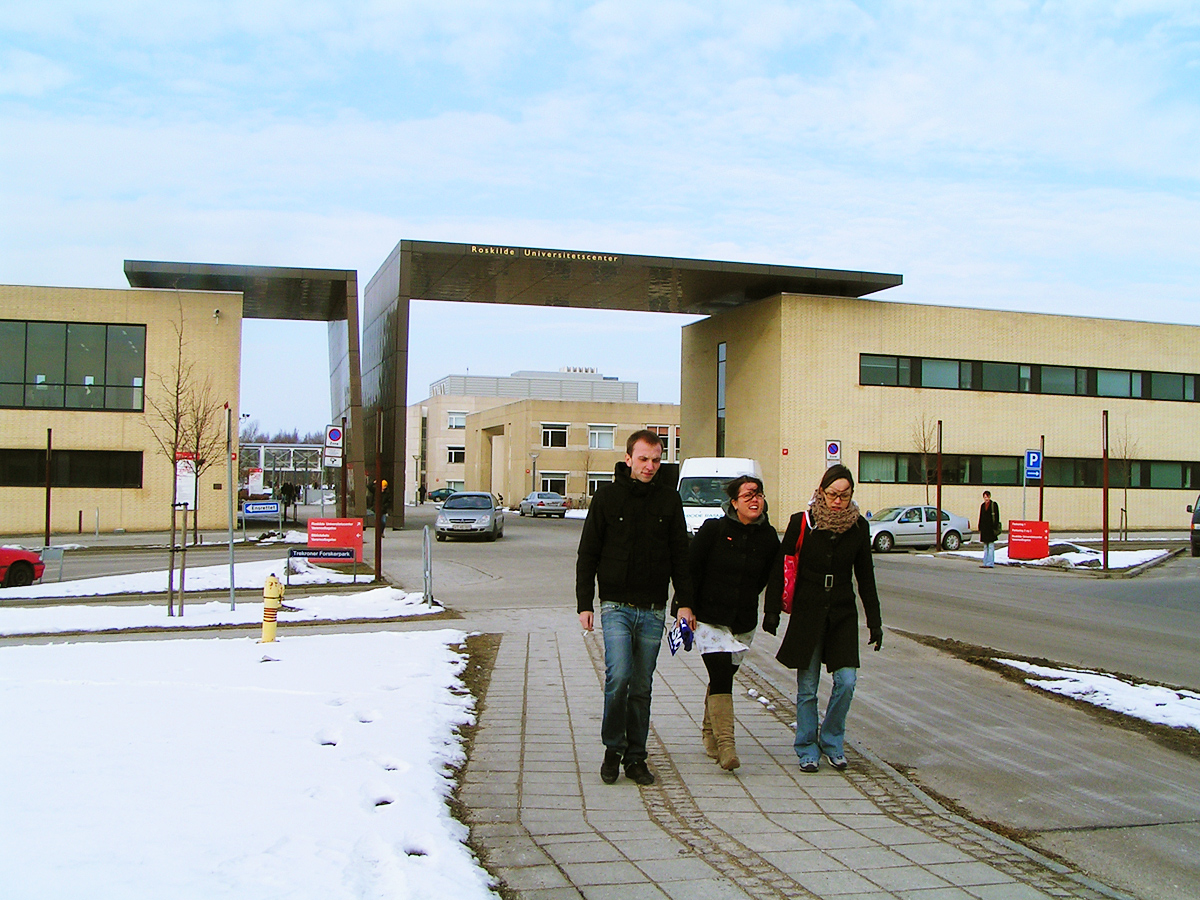
Outside Roskilde University

The university was founded in 1972 and was initially intended as an alternative to the traditional Danish universities which had been the scene of several student uprisings in the late 1960s. The students considered the traditional universities undemocratic and controlled by the professors and wanted more influence as well as more flexible teaching methods.

In the 1970s the university was known for its very liberal education as opposed to the usual lectures provided by the more traditional universities of Copenhagen and Aarhus. The focus was shifted from traditional lectures to group orientated methods and projects rather than traditional exams.

Back in 1972, these educational ideas were both unorthodox and controversial, but the traditional universities in Denmark have now adopted much of the original RU concept themselves, not least the concept of group project work, which is today a recognised academic method. RU can also be said to have brought to Denmark the concepts of interdisciplinarity and less well-defined boundaries between academic fields, which originated in English-language academia.

In 2025 Roskilde University came under pressure for allowing many students and associated family members into the country, triggering a substantial increase in numbers of students from Nepal and Bangadesh. Prime Minister Mette Frederiksen stated, that universities were apparently running their own immigration policy, undermining government policies. More stringent access restrictions at universities and policies to ban spouses followed in late 2025, taking effect in 2026. Roskilde University closed its master's degree program "Business Administration and Leadership" as a consequence.

== Organization and administration ==
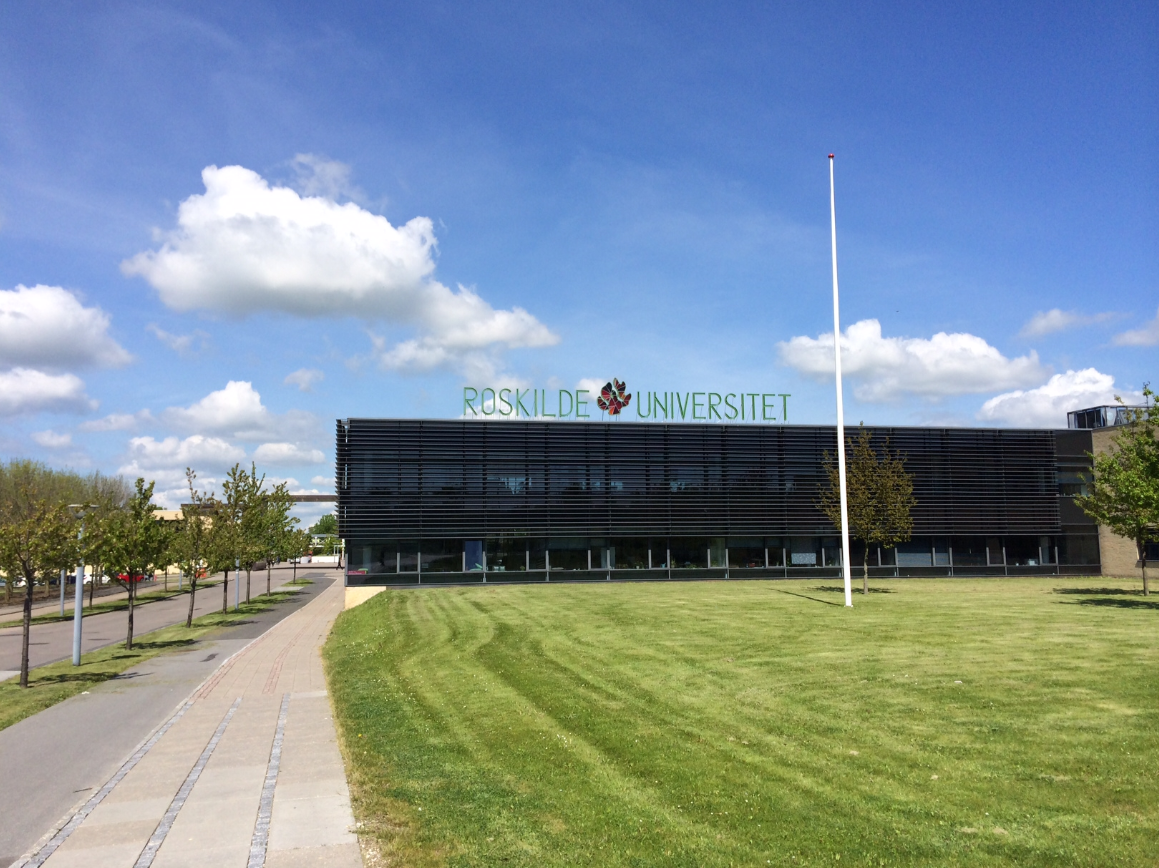
The former main building at Roskilde University

The university is governed by a board consisting of 9 members: 5 members recruited outside the university form the majority of the board, 1 member is appointed by the scientific staff, 1 member is appointed by the administrative staff, and 2 members are appointed by the university students. The Rector is appointed by the university board. The rector in turn appoints deans, and deans appoint heads of departments. There is no faculty senate and faculty is not involved in the appointment of rector, deans, or department heads. Hence the university has no faculty governance.

=== Partnerships ===
Roskilde University is an active member of the University of the Arctic. UArctic is an international cooperative network based in the Circumpolar Arctic region, consisting of more than 200 universities, colleges, and other organizations with an interest in promoting education and research in the Arctic region.

=== Degree programs ===
Roskilde University offers higher education at bachelor-, master, and PhD levels within four main areas: humanities, humanistic technologies, social science and science. The traditional educational setup at RU was based on two years of general studies in one of the main scientific areas and four years of specialization. Today, the university follows the general educational structure in Denmark, based on three years of bachelor studies qualifying for a two-year master study.

Roskilde University has 4 departments (institutes) specializing in very different areas from Mathematics to International Development:

- Department of Communication and Arts (DCA)
- Department of Science and Environment (DSE)
- Department of People and Technology (DPT)
- Department of Social Sciences and Business

The university offers three international bachelor programmes:

- International Bachelor Study Programme in the Humanities
- International Bachelor Study Programme in the Natural Sciences
- International Bachelor Study Programme in Social Science

== Rankings ==
- QS World University Rankings 2015/6: Politics & International Studies, 151-200, Communication & Media Studies, 151-200.
- Times Higher Education World University Rankings 2017: ranked 501-600
- Academic Ranking of World Universities 2016: unranked

== Notable alumni ==
Some notable alumni and professors from RUC include:

- Andreas Bang Hemmeth (DJ Encore)
- Johanne Schmidt-Nielsen, politician
- Lars Hulgård, author
- Simon Emil Ammitzbøll-Bille, politician
- Vincent F. Hendricks
- Hartmut Haberland
- Jens Høyrup
- Pernille Andersen
- Christine Lorentzen
- Eyðgunn Samuelsen
- Anders Bæksgaard, journalist, political editor at Politiken
- Mette Abildgaard, politician
- Robert Habeck, politician, former Deputy Prime Minister of Germany

== See also ==
- List of universities and colleges in Denmark
- Open access in Denmark
