= Egotronic =

German electropunk band

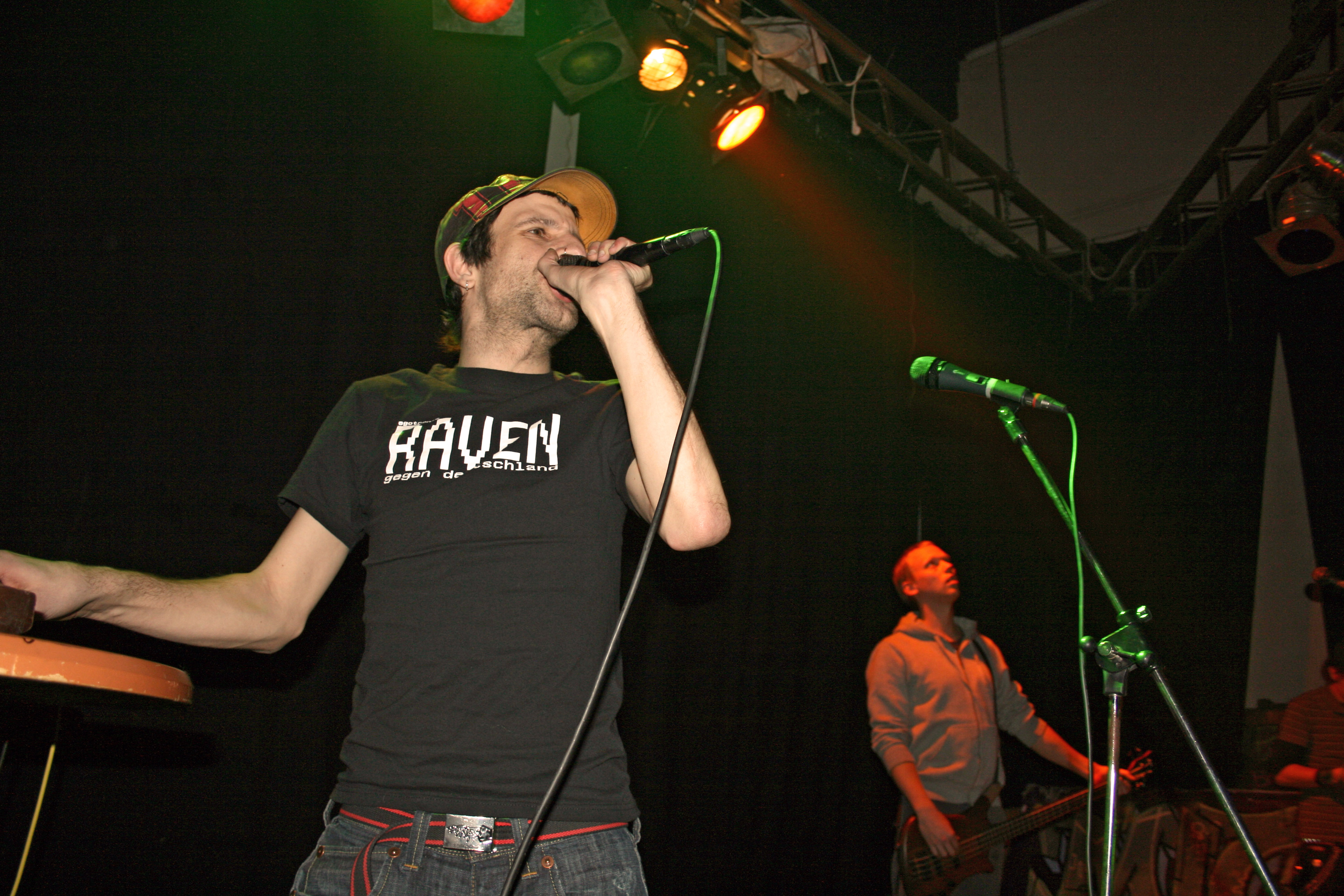
- Torsun and Hoerm of "Egotronic" on stage in 2007

Background information
- Origin: Berlin, Germany
- Genres: Electronic, techno, electropunk
- Years active: 2000–present
- Label: Audiolith Records
- Members: Torsun; Endi; KT&F
- Past members: Jennis
- Website: egotronic.net

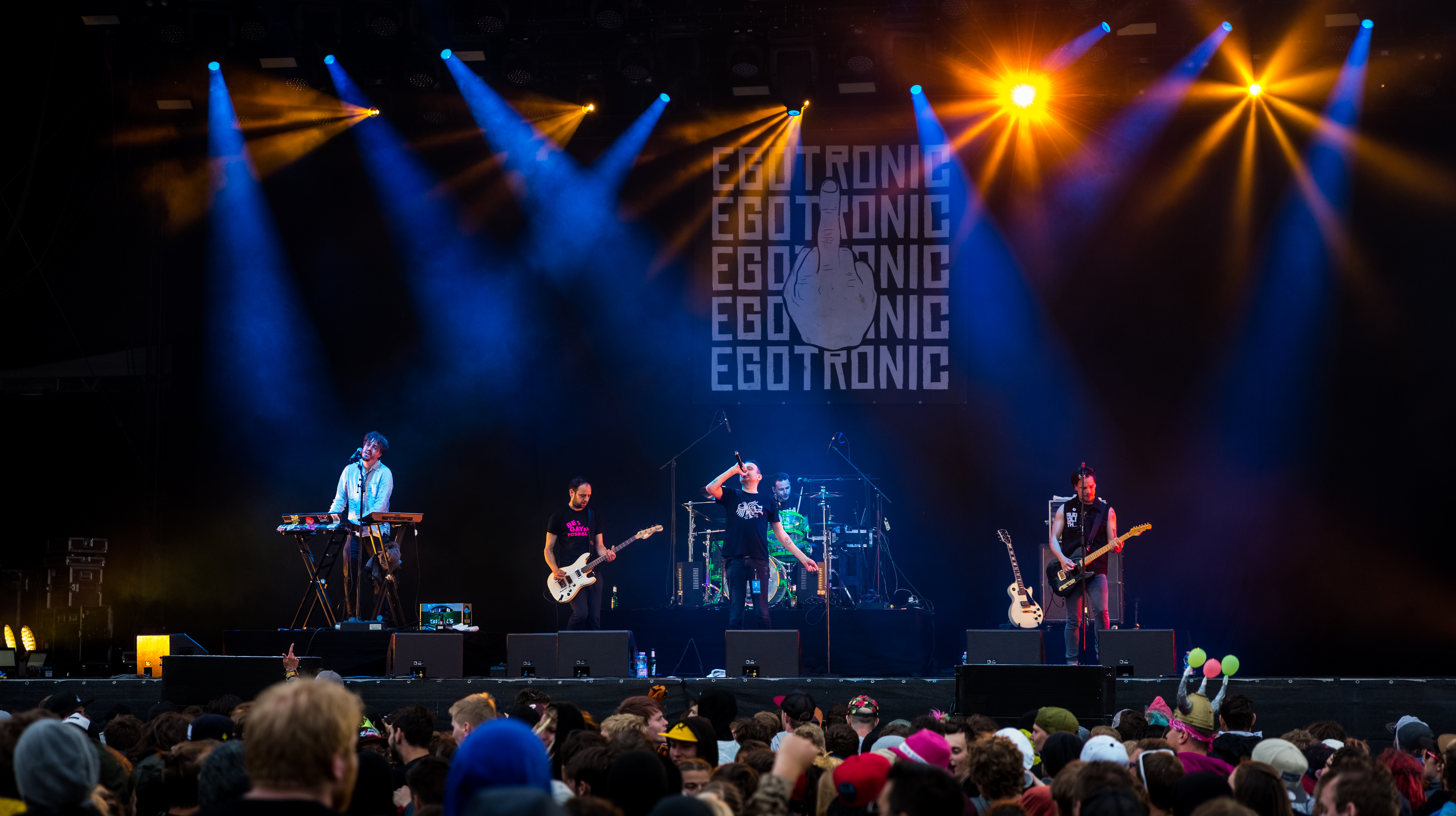
Egotronic live at Rock am Ring 2017

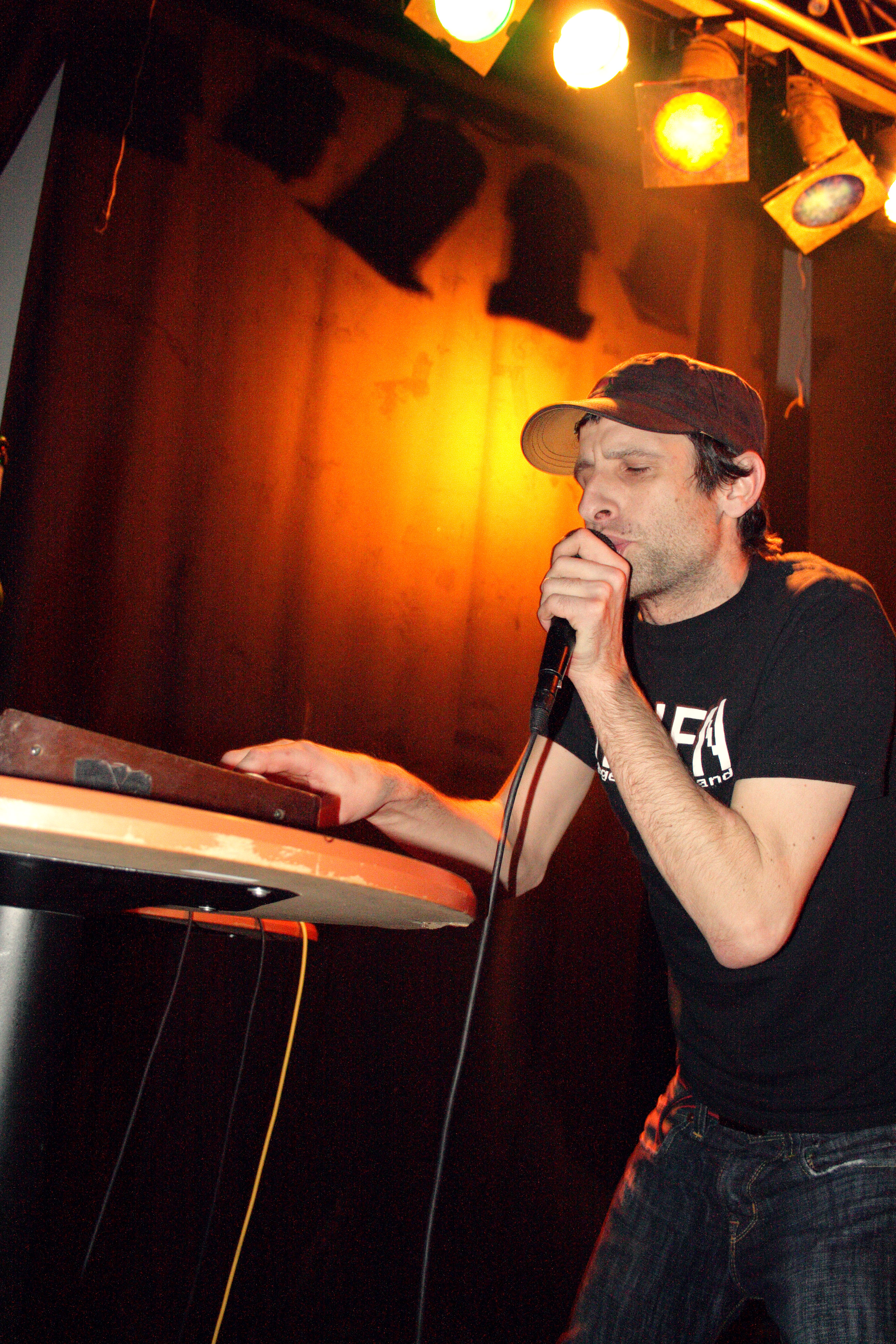
Torsun (2007)

Egotronic is a German electropunk band from Berlin formed in 2000. It is well known for its Antideutsch political views.

== Band history ==
After a couple of projects released through self-publishing, Egotronic joined the Hamburg record label Audiolith Records in 2005, whereon their first single Nein nein/Luxus (No no/luxury) got released. The band went on a tour through Russia (accompanied by the artist Plemo) during the same year. In 2006, Egotronic released their first album Die richtige Einstellung (The right attitude). The second album, Lustprinzip (Pleasure principle) followed in 2007, the third one in 2008. Its fourth album, called Ausflug mit Freunden (Excursion with friends), on which almost every song is a cooperation with friends of Egotronic, was released on 30 April 2010. Their fifth album Macht keinen Lärm (Don't be noisy) is heavily influenced by classic punk music, making heavy use of guitars, and pop music, featuring more melodic and less trashy songs compared to earlier albums.

== Genre ==
In their style, the band combines the attitude and the sociocritical pretensions of punk rock with elements from Electronic music and Synthpop. Egotronic closely cooperates with other Audiolith bands, such as Frittenbude or Saalschutz, which also show stylistic similarities. One of Egotronic's characteristics is the extensive use of Commodore 64 and Atari sounds, which are, however, produced on contemporary computers. Especially sounds that are well-known from classic computer games are often used in the songs; even the music videos are reminiscent of those old computer games.

== Political activism ==
Egotronic participates in the initiative I Can't Relax in Deutschland, which is an organization of artists, who criticize German patriotism and an increasing nationalization of pop culture. In its lyrics, Egotronic often communicates political messages, for example on the debates on Leitkultur or Jürgen Möllemann. In the song Nicht nur Raver (Not just ravers), Egotronic takes a stand in the discussion on the Riot of Rostock-Lichtenhagen and the Mügeln mob attack. Egotronic's anti-German attitude is subject to criticism, even within the left scene. Public attention was drawn to the band for its Rave-style version of the English football song Ten German Bombers, which got released on the occasion of the FIFA World Cup in 2006. The leftist nationwide newspaper taz reported on the song.

== Discography ==
Singles:

- 2005 Nein Nein/Luxus
- 2007 Lustprinzip
- 2008 Kotzen
- 2009 Es muß stets hell für Gottes Auge sein
- 2010 Was soll's
- 2010 Ich kanns nicht sagen (feat. Midimúm)
- 2011 Rannte der Sonne hinterher (feat. Mirco)
- 2013 The Lost Tapes EP
- 2014 Noch nicht vorbei
- 2014 Kriegserklärung / Dreck Scheisse Pisse (Split-Single mit Grim 104)

Albums:

- 2006 Die Richtige Einstellung
- 2007 Lustprinzip
- 2008 Egotronic
- 2010 Ausflug mit Freunden
- 2011 Macht Keinen Lärm
- 2014 Die Natur ist dein Feind
- 2017 Keine Argumente!
