= Ikkimel =

German rapper (born 1997)

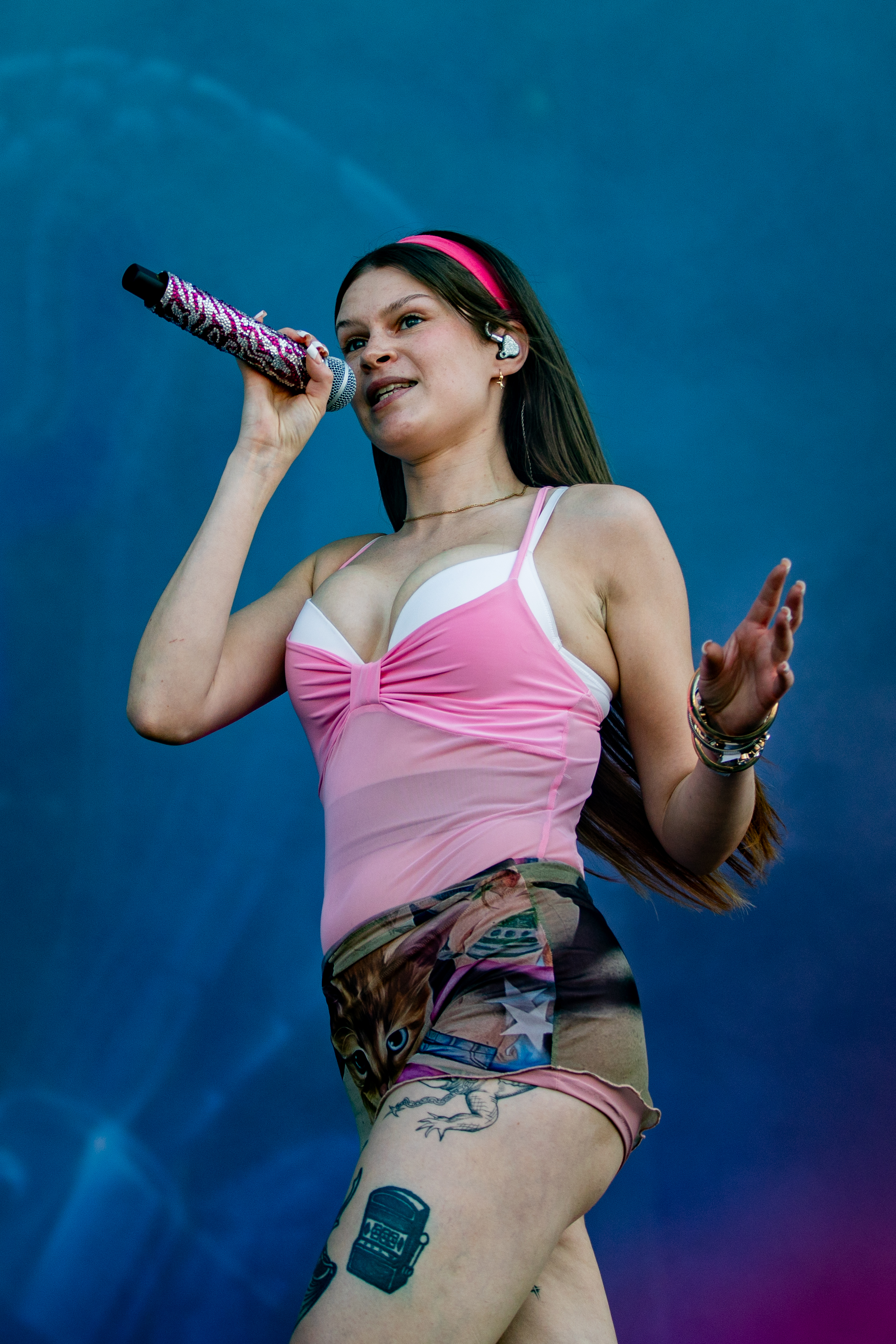
Ikkimel at Southside Festival 2025

Melina Gaby Strauß (born 18 May 1997), known professionally as Ikkimel, is a German rapper from Berlin-Tempelhof.

== Life ==
Ikkimel is from Berlin-Tempelhof and has a combined bachelor's degree in German Philology and Social and Cultural Anthropology with a focus on linguistics, from Freie Universität Berlin. After beginning her master's degree in linguistics, she started working in the university's Brain Language Laboratory in 2018. Following her father's death due to blood cancer, she started making music, taking on the name Ikkimel.

„Ich hab immer gern Rap gehört und Party gemacht, gerne gefreestyled mit Freunden etc. Anfang Corona ist mein Vater gestorben an Blutkrebs. Das war nach Jahren der Pflege dann der Punkt wo ich dachte man lebt nur einmal ich Scheiß jetzt auf alles und mach einfach das was mir Spaß macht.“

[“I've always loved listening to rap and partying, freestyling with friends, etc. At the beginning of the coronavirus pandemic, my father died of blood cancer. After years of caring for him, that was the point where I thought, you only live once, so I'm going to say screw everything and just do what I enjoy.”]

— Ikkimel,

== Career ==
In 2021, Ikkimel obtained funding from Initiative Musik. She released her first singles in 2022 and followed up with her first EP Aszendent Bitch on 5 May 2023. Her provocative lyrics contain clearly sexualized language; common themes include being a bitch, partying, drugs and sex, and she often includes subtle wordplay. She makes fun of macho behavior. Musically, she uses hyperpop and Jersey Club quotes with choppy beats and trance and house samples. She also describes her music as "Fotzenstyle", meaning "cunt-style". Ikkimel has named Blümchen, Peter Fox and Frauenarzt among her musical influences.

In 2023, Ikkimel was signed by Four Music (Sony Music), after which she debuted with the single Keta und Krawall, produced by Barré, and reached number 89 in the German charts.

The track Bezahlen from the EP Hat sie nicht gesagt, released in 2024, was used in the same year by Die PARTEI in a radio election commercial for the 2024 European elections. Hessischer Rundfunk refused to broadcast it on its radio program You FM, arguing that the song contained content that was harmful to minors. The broadcaster lost a subsequent court case initiated by Die PARTEI before the administrative court in Frankfurt am Main, so the commercial was broadcast in the early evening program on 15 May.

On 14 February 2025, Ikkimel released her debut album Fotze ("cunt"). The album was critically acclaimed and it was emphasized that sexist language was counteracted through her radical female perspective. The lyrics for the track Jetzt erst recht address the question whether this reproduces the male gaze of female sexuality: "Is Ikkimel still feminist at all? Suddenly the little pissers pretend that it is important to them." Ikkimel described her own political stance as “definitely feminist". The album also references other musicians such as Lady Bitch Ray, SXTN and Shirin David in its content and musical design.

== Personal life ==
In 2024, Ikkimel made her relationship to fellow rapper Ski Aggu public. In June 2025 they announced they had separated.

== Discography ==
=== Albums ===
- 2025: Fotze
- 2026: Poppstar

=== EPs ===
- 2023: Aszendent Bitch
- 2024: Hat sie nicht gesagt
- 2026: Ikkimel Die Geile EP

=== Singles ===
- 2022: Cola Zero (with forsha)
- 2023: Zu raus (with Axel X)
- 2023: Ich seh gut aus (with Axel X and Lenny Fuck)
- 2023: Vorbei an der Schlange (with Axel X)
- 2023: Erste Sahne (with Pintendari)
- 2023: Lifesaver (with Retado & Slim Salabim)
- 2023: Keta und Krawall
- 2024: Bikini grell
- 2024: Fussballmänner
- 2024: Hat sie nicht gesagt
- 2024: Deutschland (Ski Aggu feat. Ikkimel)
- 2024: Männergefühle (with Salò & UHD)
- 2024: Wellness
- 2024: Unisexklo (with Lucry & Suena)
- 2024: Baddie (with Money Boy)
- 2025: Forever Swagger (Money Boy feat. Ikkimel)
- 2025: Jiggy (with Filow)
- 2025: Nachtschicht (with 01099)
- 2025: Germany (Ski Aggu, Ikkimel, Dauner, Barré)
- 2025: Who’s That
- 2025: Bling Bling (nocashfromparents)
- 2025: IDGAF
- 2025: Mami (The Cratez)
- 2025: Giftmord (Barré)
- 2026: KINK (Barré, Florida Juicy)
- 2026: NOT TODAY (Florida Juicy, nocashfromparents)
- 2026: TIPPS VON MIR (nocashfromparents, Florida Juicy)
