= Baran Kok =

Baran Kok (* 2000 or 2001 in Istanbul) is a German rapper. He is considered the first major, openly gay rapper in Germany.

== Life ==
Kok was born in Istanbul and grew up in Freiburg im Breisgau as the child of Kurdish immigrants. After finishing school, he spent a year in the US, where, according to his own account, he was able to openly deal with his homosexuality for the first time.

In 2022 he moved to Berlin and started making music there. There, he initially worked as a live DJ, including as the tour DJ for Domiziana. In March 2024, he released his first single as a rapper, "Herr Officer," which went viral on TikTok. More songs followed, such as "Hey Alexa" and "Traurige Hure". He performed at the Splash! Festival in 2025 and 2026, as well as an opening act for artists such as Ikkimel and Ski Aggu. In April 2026 he played his first solo tour Free Baran Kok.

In response to the attack on the Berlin CSD 2026, he organized a benefit concert, at which Herbert Grönemeyer, among others, performed.

== Music style ==
Kok combines elements of rap, hip-hop, club music, and DJ sets. His music is described as explicit and queer-positive, addressing themes such as sexuality, homophobia, and loneliness.
