= Nura (German rapper) =

German rapper and actor (b. 1988)

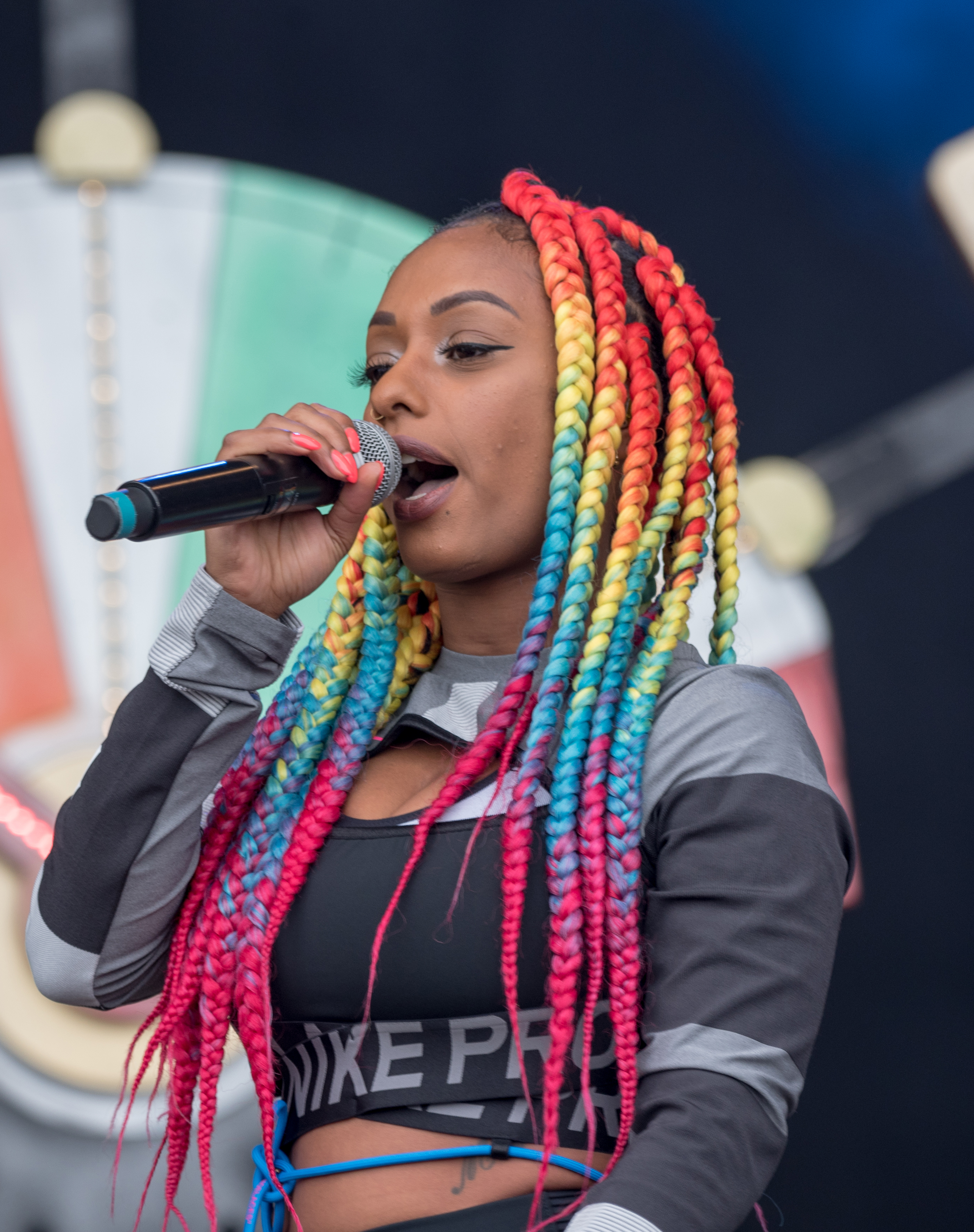
- Nura at the Openair Frauenfeld 2019

Background information
- Born: Nura Habib Omer; 24 December 1988 (age 37); Kuwait City, Kuwait
- Genres: German hip hop, Trap, Rap, Hip hop
- Occupation: Rapper
- Years active: 2015-present

Nura Habib Omer (Arabic: نورا حبيب عمر, born 24 December 1988) is a German rapper and actor of Eritrean descent. She is known for having been part of The toten Crackhuren im Kofferraum and the rap duo SXTN. Following the split of SXTN in 2018, she has pursued a solo career. As an actor she is best known for playing Flora in the Amazon Prime Video series Die Discounter. In 2025 Nura was featured in the German ads for Call of Duty: Black Ops 7 as a new version of the Replacer.

== Discography ==
=== Studio albums ===
Title	Album details	Peak chart positions		
Title	Album details	GER	AUT	SWI
Habibi	Released: 29 March 2019; Label: JINX Music; Formats: Fanbox, CD, digital download, streaming	14	37	—
Auf der Suche	Released: 20 August 2021; Label: JINX Music; Formats: Fanbox, CD, digital download, streaming	22	—	—

=== Singles ===
==== As lead artist ====
Title	Year	Peak chart positions			Album
Title	Year	GER	AUT	SWI	Album
"Auf der Kippe"	2017	—	—	—	Habibi
"Babebabe" (featuring SAM)	2018	74	—	—	Habibi
"Chaya" (featuring Trettmann)	2018	33	—	—	Habibi
"Nackt" (with Remoe)	2018	78	—	—	Non-album single
"SOS" (with Remoe)	2019	56	—	—	Habibi
"Was ich meine"	2019	64	—	—	Habibi
"Sativa"	2019	—	—	—	Habibi
"Radio"	2019	100	—	—	Habibi
"Fortnite"	2019	—	—	—	Habibi
"Kein Bock"	2019	—	—	—	Non-album single
"Interlude"	2019	—	—	—	Habibi
"Ohne Sinn" (featuring Bausa)	2019	—	—	—	Habibi
"Habibi"	2019	—	—	—	Habibi
"Keiner hat gefragt"	2019	—	—	—	Habibi
"Wuppertal"	2019	—	—	—	Habibi
"Laut"	2019	—	—	—	Habibi
"Babe"	2019	—	—	—	Habibi
"Comfort Zone" (with Manuellsen)	2019	—	—	—	Non-album single
"Fair"	2021	26	—	—	Auf der Suche

==== As featured artist ====
Title	Year	Peak chart positions		
Title	Year	GER	AUT	SWI
"Wer hat das Gras weggeraucht" (B-Tight featuring Nura)	2016	—	—	—
"Echte Manner" (AchtVier and Said featuring Nura)	2016	—	—	—
"Tripsitter" (TaiMO featuring Nura)	2017	—	—	—
"31er" (Frauenarzt and Taktlo$$ featuring Nura)	2017	—	—	—
"Nutella" (Spinning 9 and Kid Cairo featuring Nura)	2017	—	—	—
"Sonntag" (Spinning 9 featuring Nura)	2017	—	—	—
"Temperamento" (Sero featuring Nura)	2018	—	—	—
"Wenn ich will" (Fruchtmax featuring Nura)	2018	—	—	—
"In Berlin" (Bausa featuring Nura)	2018	—	—	—
"Fokus" (Jugglerz featuring Miami Yacine, Bausa, Nura and Joshi Mizu)	2018	70	—	—
"36 Grad" (Zugezogen Maskulin and Carsten Chemnitz featuring Nura)	2019	—	—	—
"Verliebt in einen Gangster 2" (18 Karat featuring Nura)	2019	23	46	73
"Sie ist geladen" (Seeed featuring Nura)	2019	88	—	—

== Awards and nominations ==
=== Results ===
Year	Award	Nomination	Work	Result	Ref.
2018	1LIVE Krone Awards	Best Female Artist	Herself	Won	
2018	1LIVE Krone Awards	Best Newcomer	Herself	Nominated	
2019	Hype Awards	Female Artist	Herself	Nominated	
2019	Hype Awards	Newcomer	Herself	Nominated	
2019	Hype Awards	Instagram Account	Herself	Nominated	
2021	Bravo Otto Awards	Hip-Hop national	Herself	Nominated	

== See also ==
- Concert pictures of Nura on Wikimedia Commons
