= Zenith (building) =

Events hall in Munich, Germany

Coordinates: 48°11′41″N 11°36′30″E

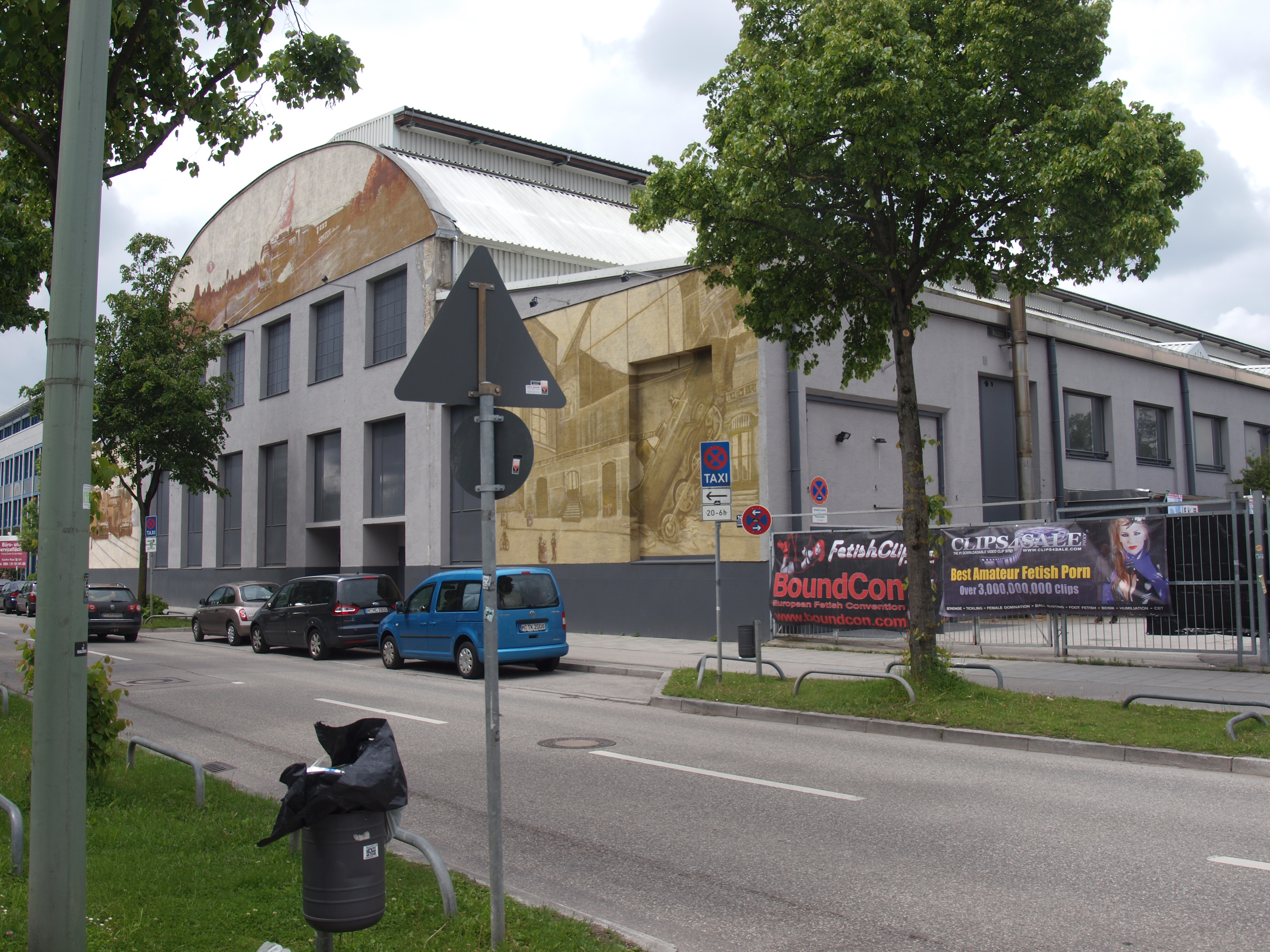
- Interactive map of Zenith
- Full name: Kulturhalle Zenith
- Address: Lilienthalallee 35; 80939 Munich, Germany
- Location: Schwabing-Freimann
- Operator: Freimann Event Betriebs
- Capacity: 5,880 (general admission); 3,100 (reserved)

Construction
- Opened: August 1996
- Architect: Firma Krupp

Website
- Venue Website (in German)

The Kulturhalle Zenith (also known as the Zenith Halle or simply Zenith) is an events hall located in the Schwabing-Freimann borough of Munich, Germany. Originally opening in 1918 as a part of a railway repair shop, the hall was converted into performance venue in 1994. Since its opening in August 1996, it has hosted concerts, fairs and company presentations.

== History ==
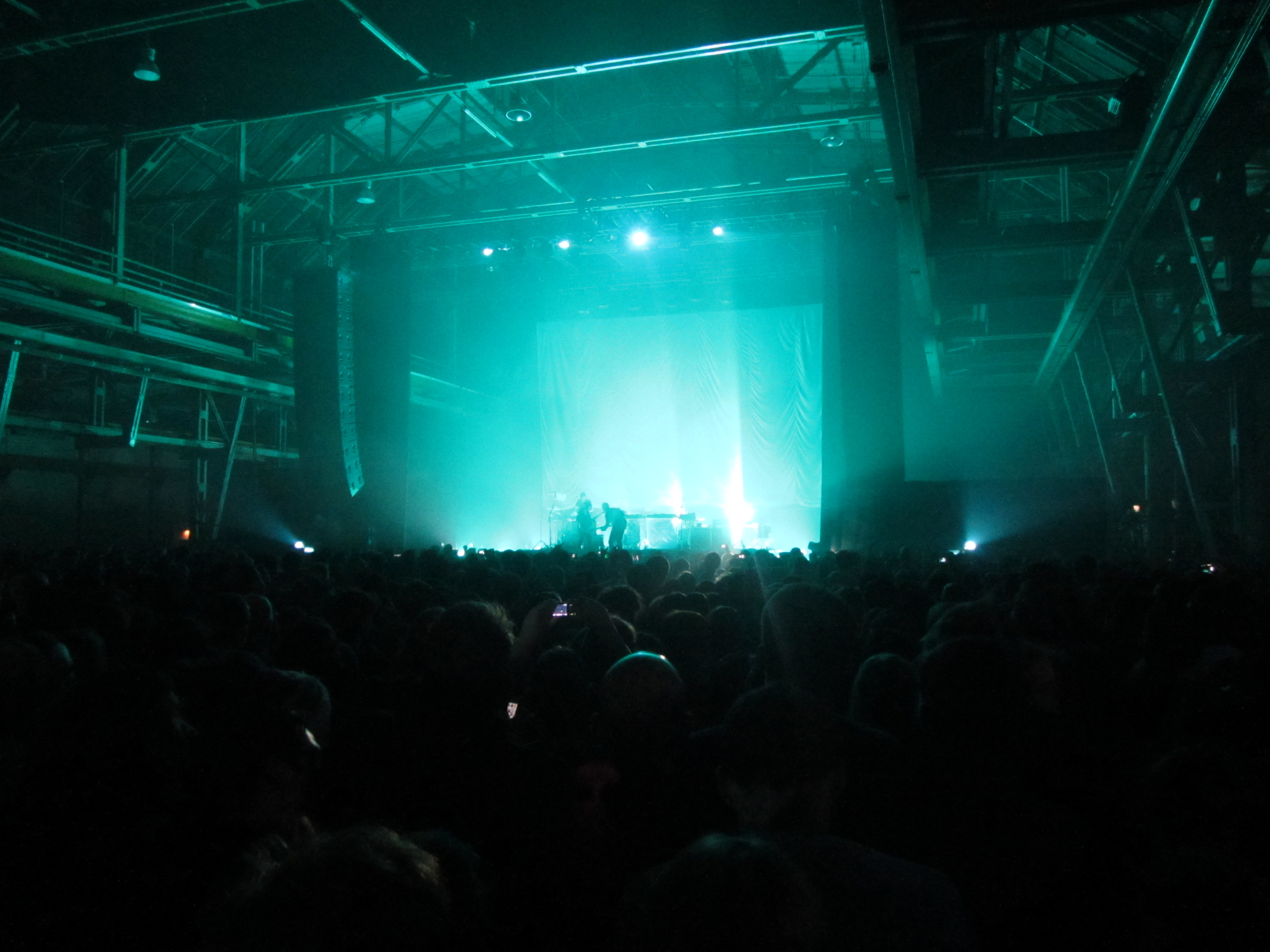
Interior

The venue was built in 1918 as Halle 5 of the Ausbesserungswerk München-Freimann. Used as a railway construction and reparation hall, the venue faced massive damage during World War II. The hall reopened in 1927, becoming a boiling shop for locomotives. The shop remained in operation until 1992. It was sold by Deutsche Bahn to local entrepreneur Wolfgang Nöth. In 1994, Nöth began converting the space into a performance venue. The space, now known as Kulturhalle Zenith, opened August 1996. The venue can hold nearly 6,000 guests.

== Noted performers ==
- Twenty One Pilots
- Arctic Monkeys
- Bullet for My Valentine
- Brandy
- Breaking Benjamin
- Simple Minds
- Motörhead
- Lana Del Rey
- Avril Lavigne
- Muse
- Gorillaz
- Katy Perry
- Lady Gaga
- Lepa Brena
- Nick Cave and the Bad Seeds
- Macklemore
- Adele
- The Prodigy
- Moderat
- Paul Kalkbrenner
- Rag'n'Bone Man
- The Script
- Alexander Marcus
- Emil Bulls
- Beginner
- Wanda
- Pink
- Fall Out Boy
- Blumentopf
- Robin Schulz
- Kollegah
- Rihanna
- Joss Stone
- No Doubt
- 257ers
- Kraftklub
- Marteria
- Clueso
- Queens of the Stone Age
- Parov Stelar
- Casper
- OneRepublic
- The National
- Kylie Minogue
- Jack White
- Rita Ora
- As I Lay Dying
- Oasis
- Lewis Capaldi
- Holly Humberstone
- Lorde
- Zara Larsson
- Pixies
- Madison Beer

== Notable events ==
- 2018 German Darts Grand Prix
- 2019 German Darts Grand Prix
- 2022 German Darts Grand Prix
- 2025 German Darts Grand Prix
