= Sxtn =

German hip hop duo from Berlin

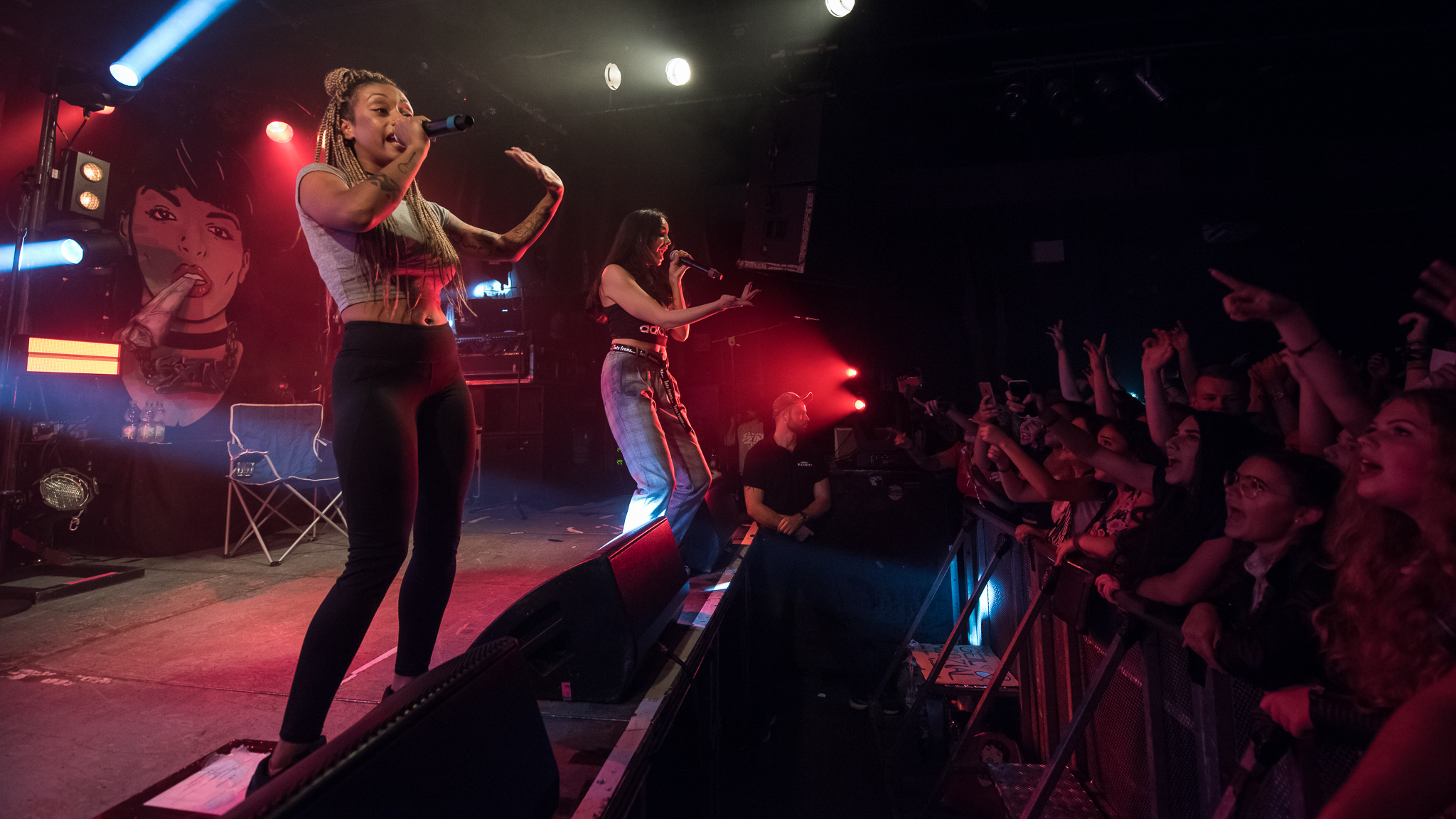
- SXTN in 2017, rapping at a concert.

Background information
- Origin: Berlin, Germany
- Genres: Hip hop, gangsta rap
- Years active: 2014–2018
- Members: Juju, Nura

Sxtn (stylized in all caps) was a German hip hop duo from Berlin consisting of rappers Juju and Nura. They are known for their somewhat-mockingly provocative lyrics, that often play on stereotypical rap themes such as sex, weed-smoking, money and party lifestyles.

== Members ==
The duo consists of rappers Juju and Nura. Nura Habib Omer left Saudi-Arabia at the age of three, when her mother fled to Germany with Nura and her three siblings. After two years in a refugee home, they moved to Wuppertal. At the age of 18, Nura moved to Berlin. Juju, whose real name is Judith Wessendorf, grew up in Neukölln with a German mother and a Moroccan father. She met Nura at the age of 17.

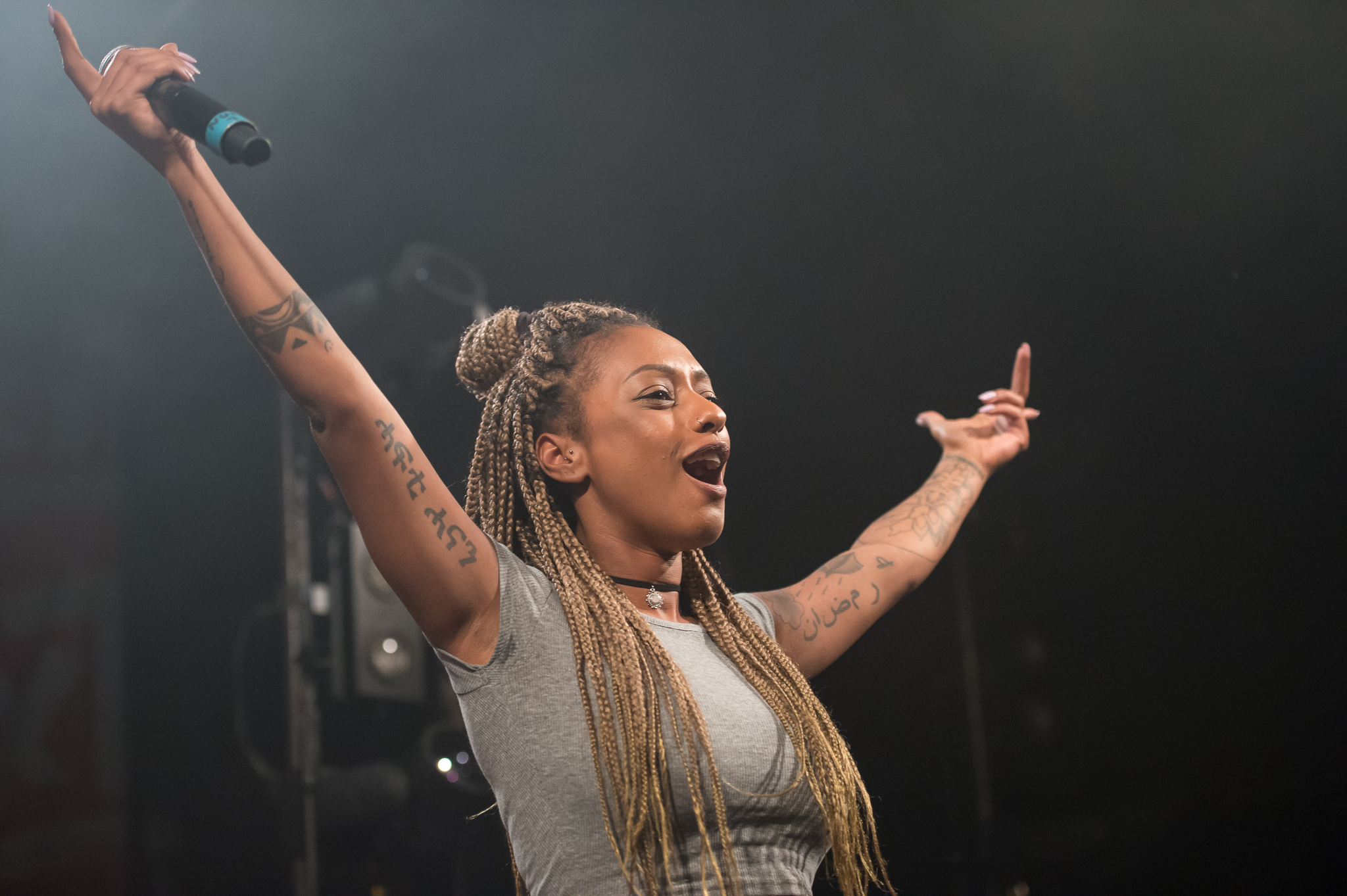
Nura - 2017

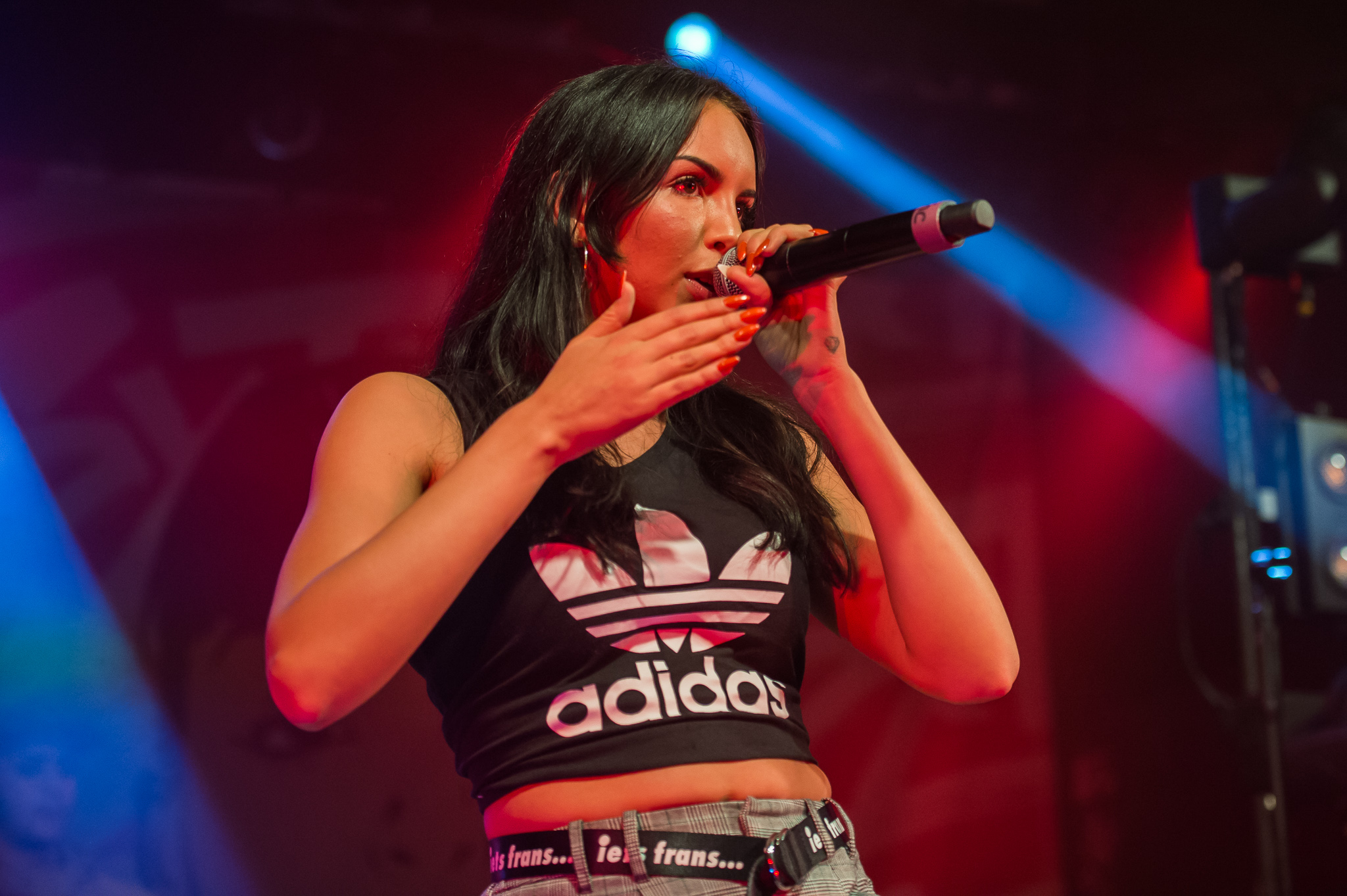
Juju - 2017

== History ==
Juju was born and raised by her mother in Berlin. She is partly Moroccan. Nura, on the other hand, was born in Kuwait and moved with her mother and her three siblings from Saudi Arabia to Germany when she was three years old. As a refugee she lived in Wuppertal and then at the age of 18 she moved to Berlin. Juju und Nura met each other in the federal capital of Germany under modest circumstances. Whilst Juju mainly rapped in company of her friends, Nura had already had some stage practice with the band The toten Crackhuren im Kofferaum and with the "Berliner Kneipenchor". Then, in 2014 Sxtn was founded. Their first EP, titled Asozialisierungsprogramm, was released in 2016. Their debut studio album, titled Leben am Limit, was released in 2017 and peaked at 8 on the German charts, and also peaked at 1 on the German hip-hop charts. In a late-2018 Instagram post, Juju revealed that she and Nura intended to focus on their own individual solo careers going forward, and that they had become otherwise estranged aside from their time performing on-stage together, which resulted in speculations regarding a possible disbandment of Sxtn.

In April of 2019 Nura stated that she will no longer work together with her former bandmate when it comes to making music. Juju confirmed the split one month later.

== Lyrical content ==
Sxtn's lyrics often utilise male clichés, and rap about prostitution, drugs and partying.

== Discography ==
=== Studio albums ===
- 2017: Leben am Limit

=== EPs ===
- 2016: Asozialisierungsprogramm

=== Singles ===
- 2015: Deine Mutter
- 2017: Die Ftzn sind wieder da
- 2017: Er will Sex
- 2017: Ständer
- 2017: Bongzimmer
- 2017: Von Party zu Party

== Tours ==
=== Headliner ===
- 2016: FTZN IM CLB Tour
- 2017: Kann Sein, Dass Scheisse Wird Tour

=== Supporting Act ===
- 2016: Zieh Dein Shirt Aus Tour (for Frauenarzt)

== See also ==
- German hip hop
