= Alexander Marcus =

German music producer (born 1972)

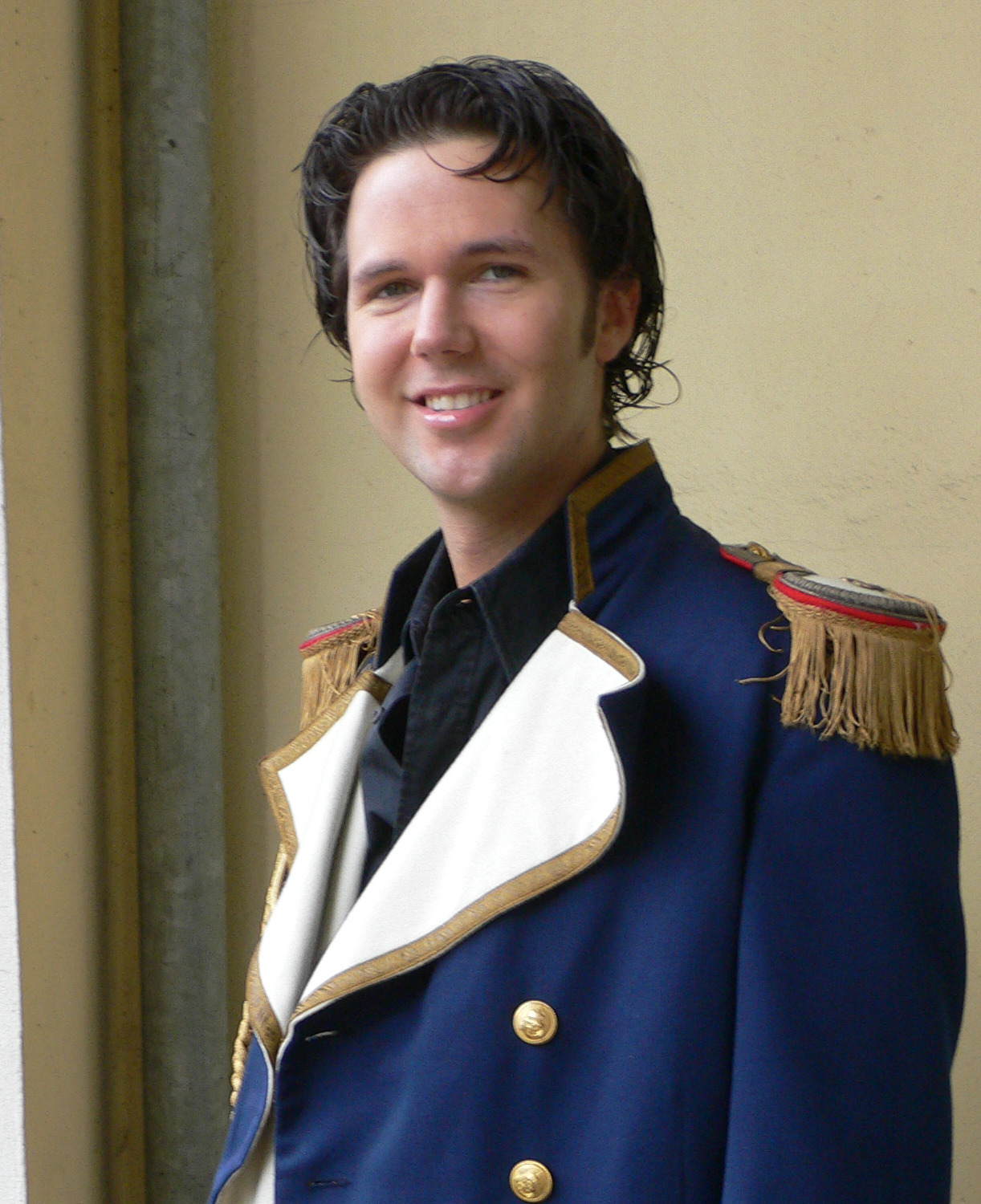
- Alexander Marcus in 2007

Background information
- Born: Felix Rennefeld; 26 July 1972 (age 54); Berlin, Germany
- Occupations: Singer, songwriter, record producer, dancer
- Website: alexander-marcus.de

Alexander Marcus (born 26 July 1972 in Berlin as Felix Rennefeld) is a German music producer. He became popular in Germany after producing and uploading a series of videos to YouTube.

== Biography ==
According to Marcus, his parents got divorced shortly after his birth. They sent him to live with his grandmother in the countryside, where he took part in the popular children's dance group "Edelweißchen". At eighteen he went to the US and lived in New York and Miami, and while there experienced international and electronic music. It was here that he formed the idea to combine this music style with aspects of German folk music and Schlager. He has been living in Berlin since 2005. On 6 June 2008 he released his debut album Electrolore with Kontor Records, which included guest contributions by Manny Marc and Frauenarzt.

== Musical style ==
Alexander Marcus' music is a mixture of modern electronic club music and folk music, which he has named 'Electrolore', a Portmanteau of 'electro' and 'folklore'. He exaggerates many of the clichés present in German Schlager music, often complementing them with "trashy" objects in his music videos, such as a recurrent plastic globe he nicknamed "Globi". Spiegel Online sees him as a typical example of a return to pop-art social criticism. Never breaking out of character, Rennefeld leaves the question of whether the character is a parody unanswered:

The idea that the guy might really be as meshugge as he seems to be remains at least possible.

— Uh-Young Kim for Spiegel Online

2008 Alexander Marcus was on tour as support act for And One.

== Discography ==
=== Albums ===
- 2008: Electrolore (released on Kontor Records, with DVD)
- 2009: Mega
- 2012: Glanz & Gloria
- 2014: Kristall
- 2017: 10 Jahre Electrolore – Das ultimative Album
- 2019: Pharao
- 2023: Robotus
- 2026: Presslufthammer

=== Guest contributions ===
- 2008: Tanz den Tanz on Die Türen-Remix-Album Booty
- 2008: Florida Lady on Atzen Musik Vol. 1 by Frauenarzt and Manny Marc
- 2009: Nessaja on Hands on Scooter by Scooter
