= Filow =

German musician

- Born: Felix Nier

Twitch information
- Channel: Filow
- Followers: 347 thousand

YouTube information
- Channel: Filow
- Years active: 2014–present
- Genres: Let's Play; comedy
- Subscribers: 250 thousand
- Views: 38.0 million
- Last updated: October 2026

Felix Nier (born 16 February 2001), known professionally as Filow, is a German influencer and musician.

== Life ==
Felix Nier grew up in Potsdam. In 2020, shortly after finishing his Abitur, he moved to Berlin. He uses various social media channels such as YouTube, Twitch, Instagram and TikTok. He is under contract with 1UP Management. In 2021, he took part in a Red Bull competition and became the official moderator of the Red Bull Twitch channel together with Ollimeee. He mainly does comedy segments on his channels. During Gamescom, an incident occurred that cost him a number of followers after he claimed to have uninvited another web video producer from the guest list. He received further criticism for a blind date video in which he participated. Since 2022 he has also been producing music. In 2024 he performed with the Frankfurt duo Mehnersmoos at Splash!. He produced the song Lieber Gott (German for "dear god") with them. He has 1.3 million monthly listeners on Spotify (as of October 29, 2025).

He became known with the song Rasenschach, which he produced during the 2024 European Football Championship in Germany. The song was produced in the span of 3 hours during a live stream. It is less of a football song and more of a parody of a football song. In the two and a half minutes, he raps in a highly exaggerated Berlin dialect, with dirty jokes and sexually connoted puns, left-wing extremist slogans (with a line translating to "We're killing all Nazis and their swastikas"), chauvinism and references to Balkonultra's party hit song Pyrotechnik, among others. He himself describes the song as a play on stereotypes. The song reached number 58 in the German charts. He also performed this song in a live stream of the ARD, a German public broadcaster.

In September 2024, his album Icke was released, reaching number 28 in Germany in its week of release.

He also created songs on his streams with other musicians like Ski Aggu and Ikkimel.

== Discography ==
Studio albums

- 2024: Icke

Singles

- 2023: Glücksbringer (2 iPhones)
- 2023: Cheatcode
- 2023: Schiff
- 2023: Super Sex Bass (with yani5000)
- 2024: Red Flags
- 2024: Rasenschach
- 2024: Lieber Gott (with Mehnersmoos)
- 2024: Turbo
- 2024: Atze seit Tag 1 (with Frauenarzt; #17 of the German single-trend charts on 2. August 2024)
- 2024: Chopard
- 2024: Kiwi (with Chapo102)
- 2025: BASS (with yani5000 and fliggsy)
- 2025: Jiggy (with Ikkimel)
- 2025: Déjà-Vu (Sailor V) (with 9inebro)
- 2025: JWD (with Ski Aggu)
- 2025: Alles Anders (with Ski Aggu)
- 2026: Reiss Ein
- 2026: Bass ist geil
- 2026: Adiletten
- 2026: gutefrage.net (with Maxim K.I.Z)
- 2026: KO Tour L3ben
