= Manny Marc =

German rapper and DJ

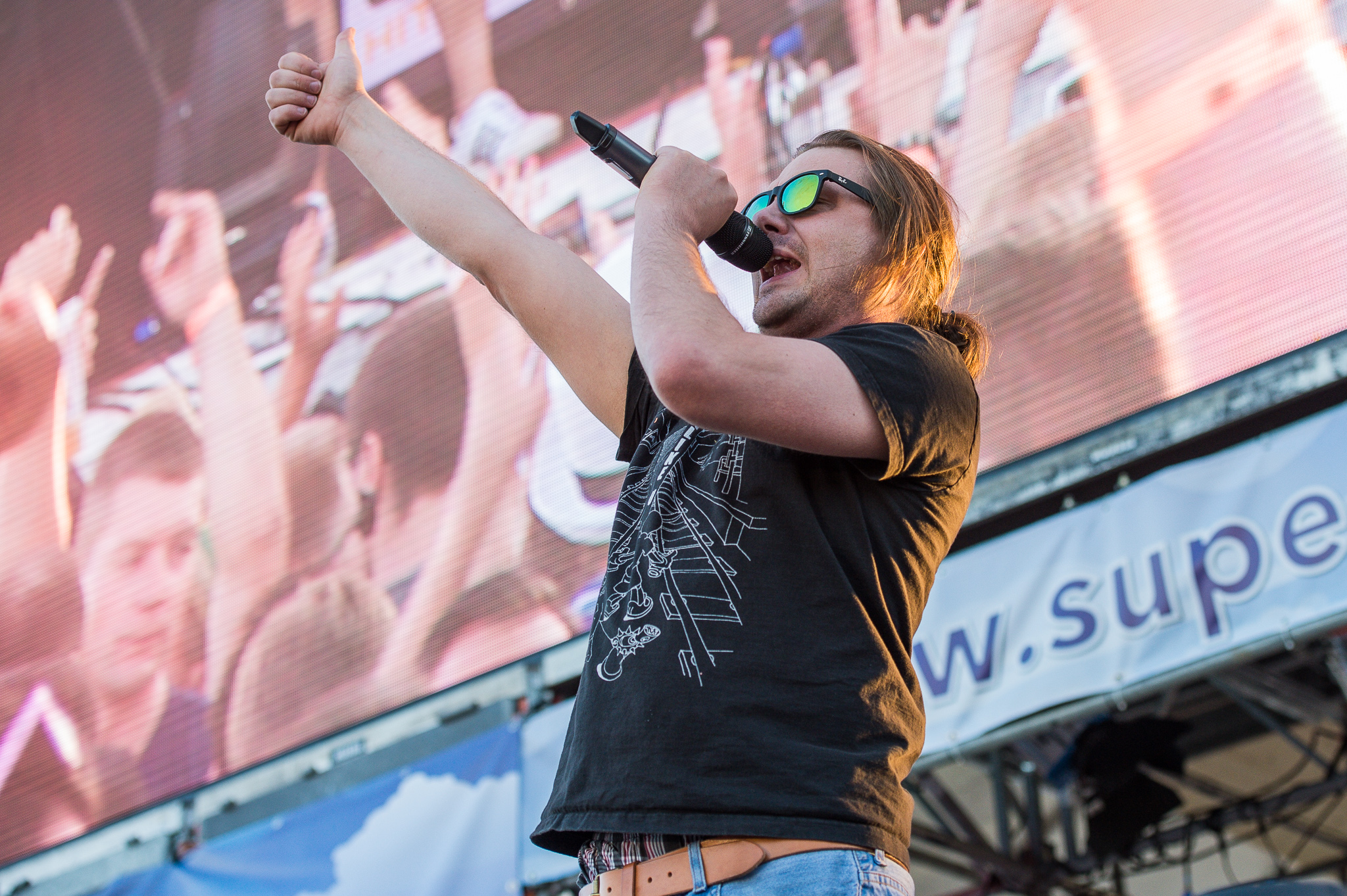
- Manny Marc performing in 2016

Background information
- Born: Marc Schneider; 1980 (age 45–46); East Berlin, East Germany
- Occupations: DJ, rapper, record producer
- Years active: 1997–present

Marc Schneider (born 1980), known professionally as Manny Marc, is a German rapper and DJ. He is the DJ of the South Berlin rap group Bass Crew, which consists of Frauenarzt, MC Basstard, and MC Bogy. In 1997, he founded the street gang Berlin Crime, with Frauenarzt, and in 1998 the independent label Bassboxxx. In 2006, he founded the label 'Ghetto Musik' with Frauenarzt.

== Albums ==
Year	Title
2005	"Berlin bleibt Untergrund - Das Album" (with Frauenarzt)
2006	"Hart an der Grenze" (with Frauenarzt)
2007	"Blutsport" (with Blokkmonsta)
2007	"Die üblichen Verdächtigen" (with Major and Spade)
2007	"Sexurlaub" (with DJ Reckless & Corus 86)
2007	"Krieg in Berlin"
2008	"Feiern mit den Pleitegeiern" (with Frauenarzt)
2008	"Danke Deutschland" EP
2008	"Atzen Musik Vol. 1" (with Frauenarzt), GER #62
2010	"Atzen Musik Vol. 2" (with Frauenarzt), GER #5, AUT #10, CH #48
2022	"Gangster (with Sonny Techno)

== Singles ==
Year	Title	Chart positions			Album
Year	Title	GER	AUT	SWI	Album
2008	"Florida Lady" (with Alexander Marcus and Frauenarzt)	89 (1 week)	-	-	Atzen Musik Vol. 1
2009	"Das geht ab!" (with Frauenarzt)	5 (39 weeks)	8 (32 weeks)	13 (29 weeks)	Atzen Musik Vol. 1
2010	"Disco Pogo" (with Frauenarzt)	2 (6 weeks)	4 (7 weeks)	26 (5 weeks)	Atzen Musik Vol. 2
2010	"Atzin" (with Frauenarzt as Die Atzen)	16	20	-	Atzen Musik Vol. 2
2011	"Party Chaos" (with Frauenarzt as Die Atzen)	-	-	-	Party Chaos
