= Adrian Julius Tillmann =

German actor

Adrian Julius Tillmann (born 1997) is a German actor. He is also active as a musician under the stage name Ritter Lean, and is known for collaborating with rapper Ski Aggu.

== Career ==
Tillmann has appeared in numerous episodes of German television shows. He is most well known for playing the lead role of Jasper in the Netflix original series Biohackers. He has also appeared in the long-running German crime series Tatort, episode Tatort: Das Herz der Schlange ("The Heart of the Snake").

His first musical releases under the pseudonym Ritter Lean (a reference to Ritalin) appeared on SoundCloud. Starting in 2018, he also featured on the first songs by Ski Aggu, whom Tillmann encouraged to pursue a music career. In 2023, he released his debut single, Einsame Insel. In the same year, his first EP, Auch ein Atze muss mal weinen, was released on the Jungeratze and Bamboo Artists labels.

In February 2025, Tillmann released his first full-length album Stell dir vor, which debuted at number 5 on the German music charts.

He has played at large music festivals, primarily in Germany, including Lollapalooza Berlin and Dockville.

== Personal life ==
Adrian Tillmann was born in Berlin in 1997. He completed his acting studies in Potsdam at the Konrad Wolf Film University of Babelsberg in 2020. Outside of music, Adrian follows the football club 1. FC Union Berlin, thereby creating the gimmick of a Union Berlin fan, alongside Ski Aggu, a Hertha BSC fan.

He is known for expressing his left-of-center political views on stage through chants against the far-right party in Germany known as the Alternative für Deutschland.
