= 01099 =

German rap crew

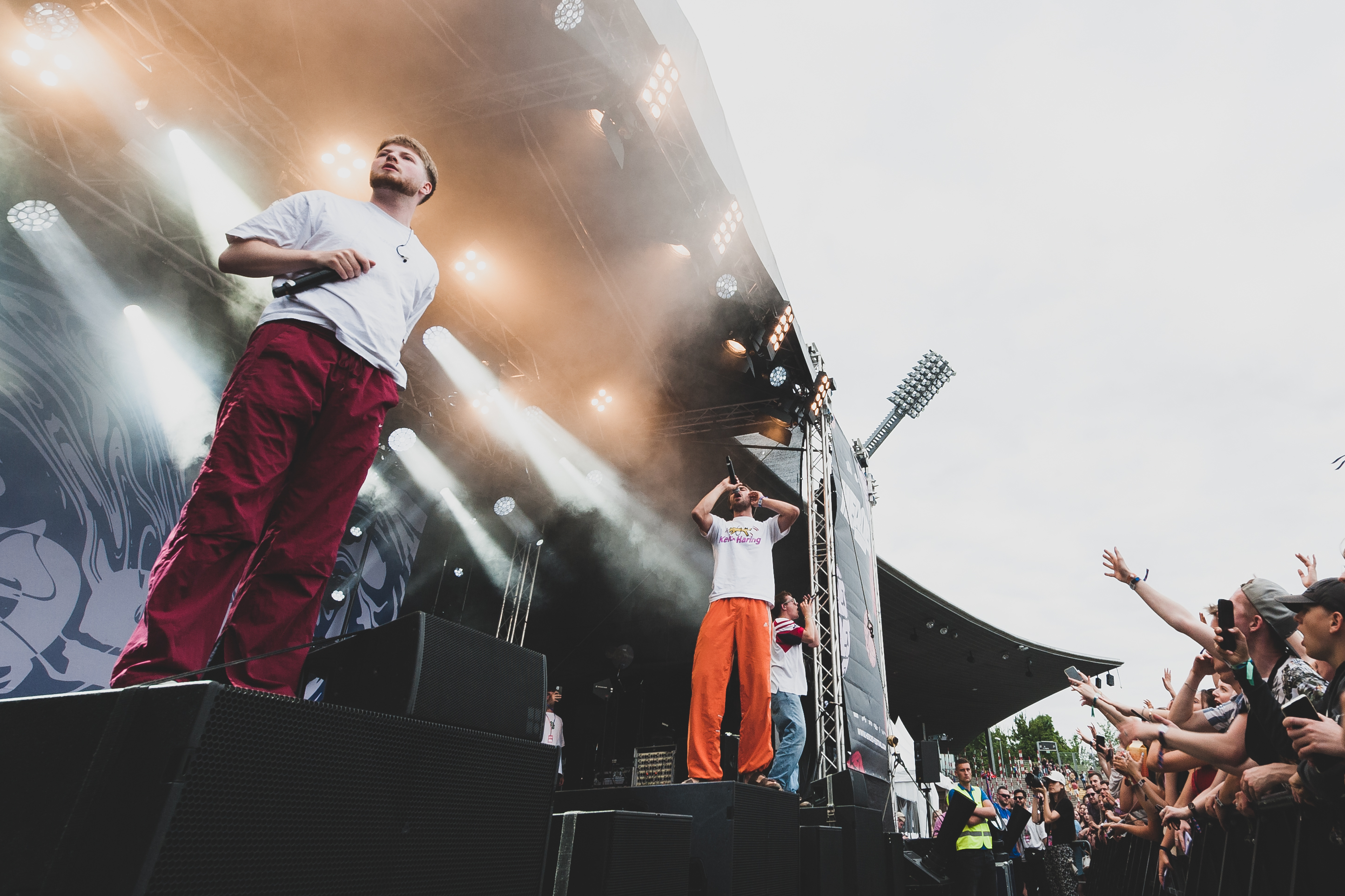
- The group performing in 2022; from the left: Gustav, Zacharias and Paul

Background information
- Origin: Dresden, Saxony, Deutschland
- Genres: Hip-Hop, rap
- Years active: 2018–present
- Members: Dani Singer and Rapper; Gustav Singer and Rapper; Zachi Singer and Rapper; Paul Singer and Rapper

01099 (German: [ˈnʊl ˈtseːn ˌnɔʏnʊntˈnɔʏntsɪç], lit. 'zero ten ninety-nine') is a German rap group from Dresden. The name refers to the postal code of Äußere Neustadt (01099), the area of the city the rappers are from.

The group consists of four members: Dani, Gustav, Paul and Zachi.

== History ==
The four members found each other partly as orchestra musicians and attended the St. Benno highschool together. They also knew each other before their highschool days, but they only formed as 01099 in 2018.

In autumn of 2019, they released their debut EP Skyr. The title is based on the Icelandic curd of the same name; the song can be understood as both an ode to curd and a parody of current hip-hop culture. According to the band themselves, the group understood their music at the time more as a parody and fun project.

In 2020, their debut album Morgensonne was released. On this album, the musicians somewhat distanced themselves from the parodic approach and tried their hand at being rappers who primarily want to convey an attitude to life. Accordingly, the album is also somewhat melancholic. Shortly after the release of the album, the group split up and the four members moved to different cities to study. Soon after this, however, Paul, Zachi and Gustav returned as the three main members of the group; in an interview with World Wide Wohnzimmer, Paul stated that he had given up his music studies after only two weeks in order to pursue a musical career. Dani, while still officially part of the group, has taken a back seat due to his formal horn studies.

01099 gained further popularity through the single Frisch, which was released in December 2020, and through this were able to reach a wider audience, especially via the platform TikTok. On March 26, 2021, Frisch entered the German singles chart at number 78 and peaked at number 36. The crew was signed by Groove Attack in 2021.

On May 14, 2021, 01099 released their single Durstlöscher. This, like Frisch, is part of the EP Dachfenster which was released on July 2, 2021. In November 2021, the band completed their first tour, which was limited due to the COVID-19 pandemic. Another tour for the album Altbau followed in April 2022.

Since the release of Frisch and Durstlöscher, the singles have amassed 7 million and 9.5 million views on YouTube, and 125.5 million and 125 million streams on the streaming platform Spotify (as of 24 October 2024).

After the pandemic, 01099 played at the following festivals in 2022:

- Superbloom 2022, dated September 3–4
- Heroes Festival 2022, dated September 9–10
- Dockville 2022, dated August 19–21
- FM 4 Frequency Festival 2022, dated August 17–20
- Szene Open Air 2022, dated August 4–6
- Splash! Festival Blue Edition 2022, dated July 7–9
- Splash! Festival Red Edition 2022, dated sometime in June
- PULS Open Air 2022, dated June 9–11

Furthermore, the group played 16 concerts in Germany, Austria and Switzerland, also in 2022.

== Style ==
The group cites the renunciation of sexist content as one of its basic principles. 01099 cites Money Boy and RIN as inspiration for their own art.

== Members ==
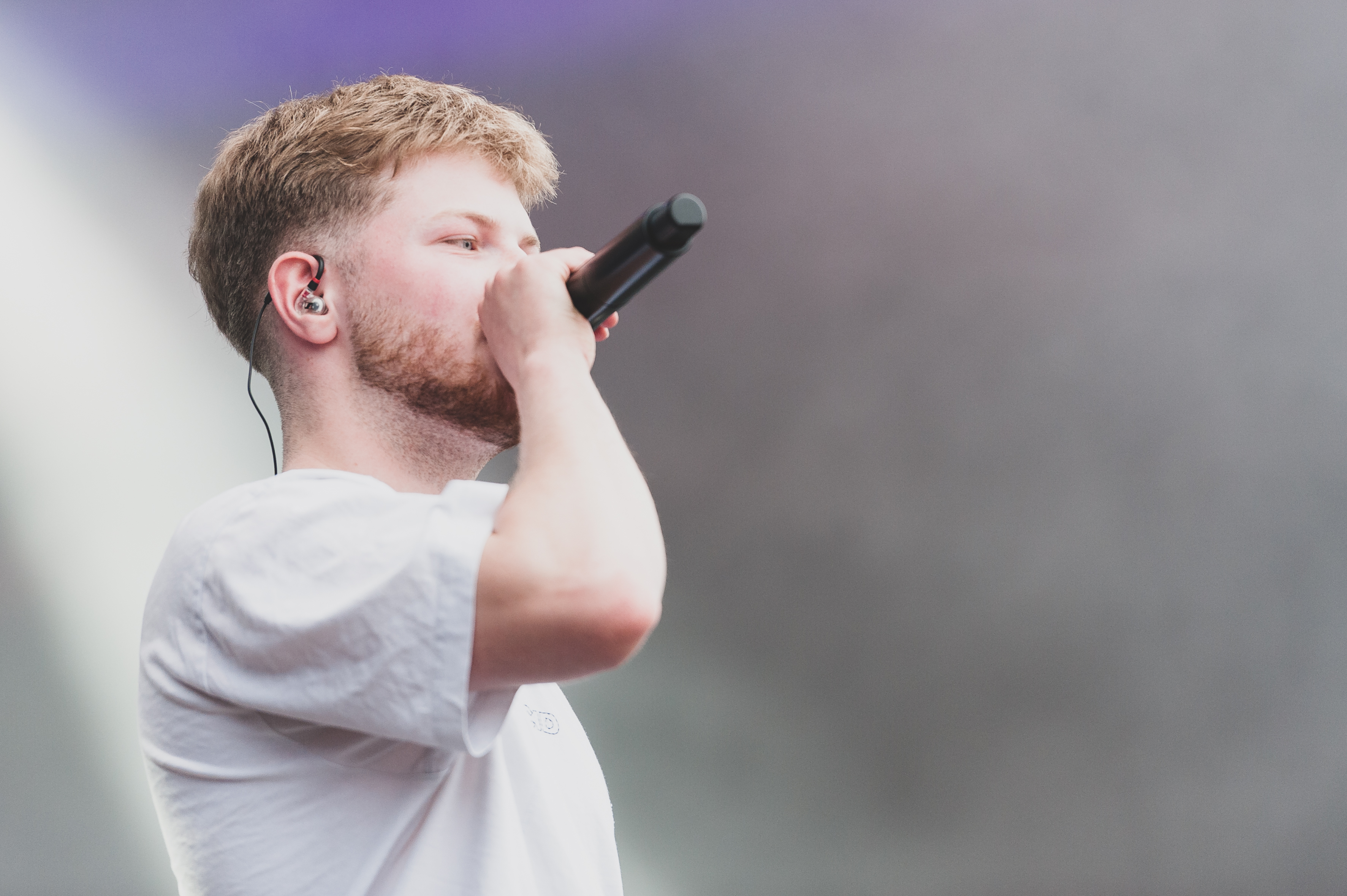
Gustav

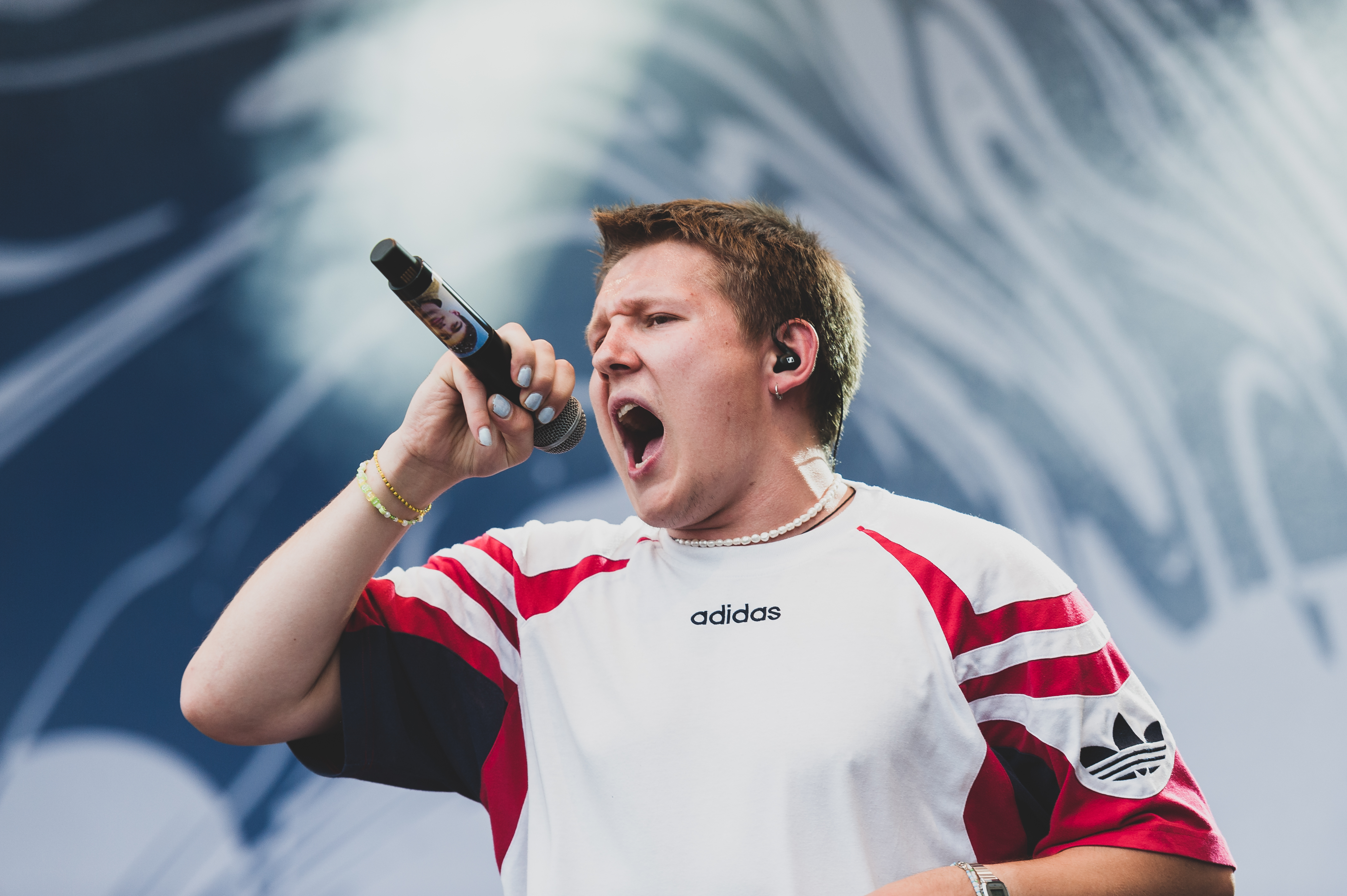
Paul

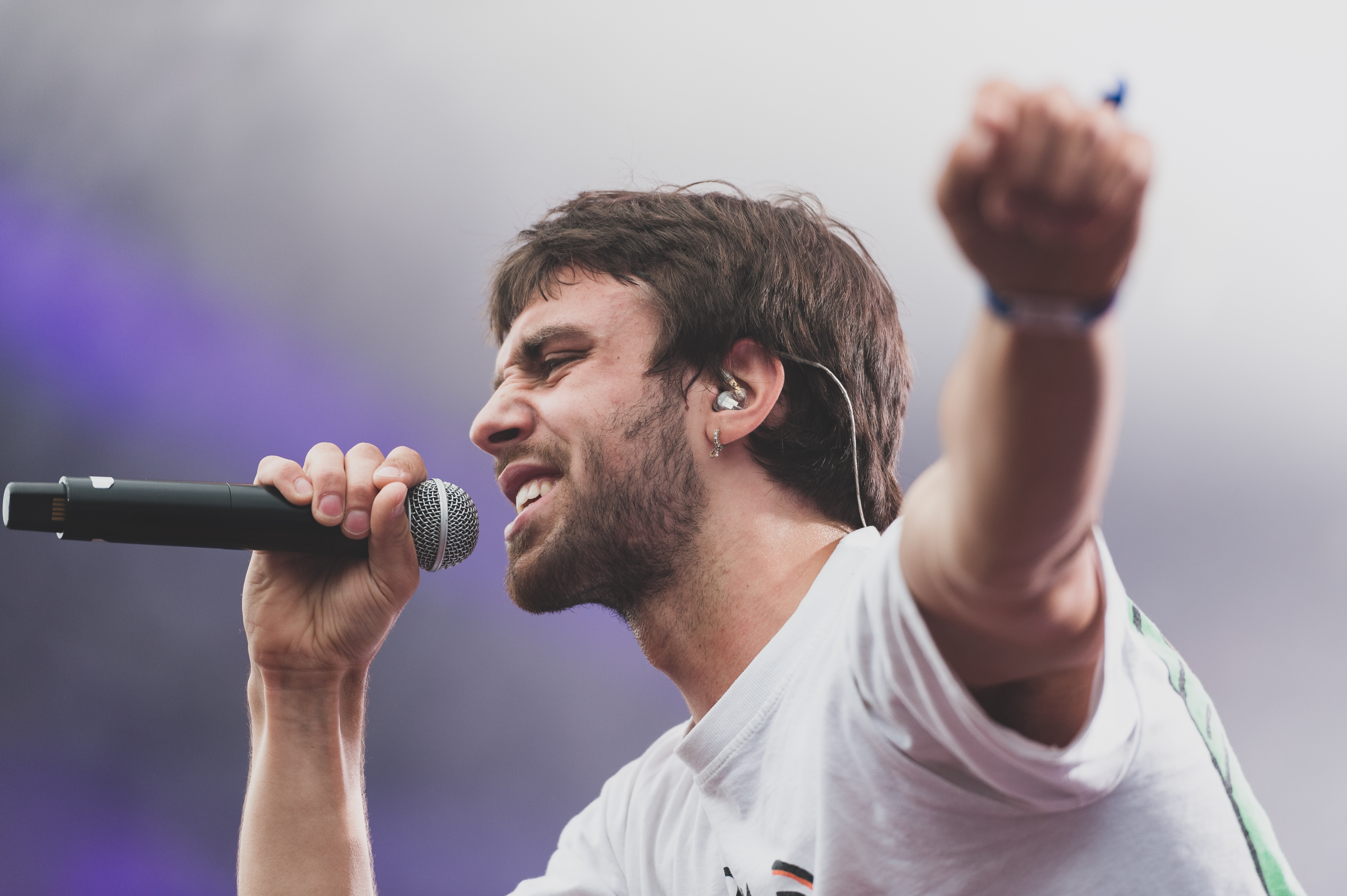
Zachi

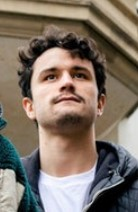
Dani

== Discography ==
=== Studio albums ===
Year	Year Label	Chart Placement			Comments
Year	Year Label	DE	AT	CH	Comments
2020	Morgensonne; 01099	—	—	—	First publication: 08/26/2020
2022	Altbau; 01099	7 (18 Wks)	19 (2 Wks)	31 (3 Wks)	First publication: 03/25/2022
2023	Blaue Stunden; 01099	1 (... Wks)	16 (... Wks)	6 (... Wks)	First publication: 11/03/2023
2024	Kinder der Nacht; 01099	1 (... Wks)	—	8 (... Wks)	First publication: 09/13/2024
2025	Orange; 01099	(... Wks)	—	(... Wks)	First publication: 09/26/2025

=== EPs ===
Year	Year Label	Chart Placement			Comments
Year	Year Label	DE	AT	CH	Comments
2019	Skyr; 01099	—	—	—	First publication: 10/14/2019
2021	Dachfenster; 01099	9(1 wk.)	—	—	First publication: 07/02/2021
2021	Weihnachtslieder EP; 01099	—	—	—	First publication: 12/21/2021

=== Singles ===
==== As lead musician ====
Year	Title Album	Chart Placement			Comments
Year	Title Album	DE	AT	CH	Comments
2019	Kreta –	—	—	—	First publication: 03/18/2019
2019	Fauna –	—	—	—	First publication: 05/25/2019
2019	Kolibri –	—	—	—	First publication: 05/29/2019
2019	Koala Mulaya –	—	—	—	First publication: 07/05/2019
2019	Vor der Polizei –	—	—	—	First publication: 09/08/2019
2020	Aloha –	—	—	—	First publication: 02/08/2020
2020	Weihnachtslied; Weihnachtslieder EP	—	—	—	First publication: 03/19/2020
2020	Eisfach –	—	—	—	First publication: 04/22/2020
2020	5 auf dem Esstisch; Morgensonne	—	—	—	First publication: 07/05/2020
2020	Nougat; Morgensonne	—	—	—	First publication: 07/22/2020
2020	Sandaletten; Morgensonne	—	—	—	First publication: 08/13/2020
2020	Frisch; Dachfenster	DE36 (24 Wks) Gold	—	—	First publication: 12/10/2020 Gustav
2020	Weihnachtslied 2020; Weihnachtslieder EP	—	—	—	First publication: 12/24/2020
2021	Durstlöscher; Dachfenster	DE17 (29 Wks.) Gold	AT60 (3 Wks)	—	First publication: 05/30/2021
2021	Dies & das Altbau	DE19 (3 Wks.)	—	—	First publication: 10/22/2021 Gustav & Zachi
2021	Weihnachtslied 2021; Weihnachtslieder EP	DE^{1}	—	—	First publication: 11/27/2021
2022	Jacke zu Altbau	DE57 (1 Wk)	—	—	First publication: 01/14/2022 Paul & Gustav
2022	2000er Altbau	DE69 (1 Wk)	—	—	First publication: 02/25/2022 Gustav, Zachi & Paul feat. Miksu/Macloud
2022	Schnelle Brille; Altbau	DE71 (1 Wk)	—	—	First publication: 03/11/2022 Gustav & Zachi
2022	Glücklich; Altbau	DE16 (10 Wk)	AT24 (2 Wo.)	CH40 (1 Wk)	First publication: 03/24/2022 Gustav & Zachi feat. Cro
2022	Skandalös –	DE29 (2 Wks)	—	CH72 (1 Wk)	First publication: 09/09/2022 Gustav & Zachi
2022	Cider –	DE24 (2 Wks)	AT55 (1 Wk)	CH65 (1 Wk)	First publication: 09/30/2022 Paul feat. Soho Bani
2022	Warm –	DE73 (1 Wks)	—	—	First publication: 11/04/2022 Gustav & Zachi
The following songs did not appear as singles, but were made available for download and streaming through the album and were thus able to gain a chart placement:
2021	Halligalli; Dachfenster	DE92(1 Wks)	—	—	Chart entry: 07/09/2021 Gustav, Paul & Zachi feat. BHZ, Longus Mongus, Ion Miles & Big Pat

^{1} Weihnachtslied 2021 could not place in the official German single charts, but reached eleventh place in the single trend charts (3 December 2021).

==== As Guests ====
Year	Title	Chart Placement			Comments
Year	Title	DE	AT	CH	Comments
2021	1976 (Remix) –	—	—	—	First publication: 08/20/2021 RIN feat 01099
2022	Eigentlich –	DE19 (13 Wks.)	AT48 (1 Wk.)	CH64 (1 Wk.)	First publication: 07/15/2022 Lea feat. 01099

== Awards ==
Anmerkung: Auszeichnungen in Ländern aus den Charttabellen bzw. Chartboxen sind in ebendiesen zu finden.

Country/Region	Gold	Platin	Sales	Sources
Germany (BVMI)	2×	—	400.000	musikindustrie.de
In Total	2×	—		
