= Ski Aggu =

German musical artist (born 1997)

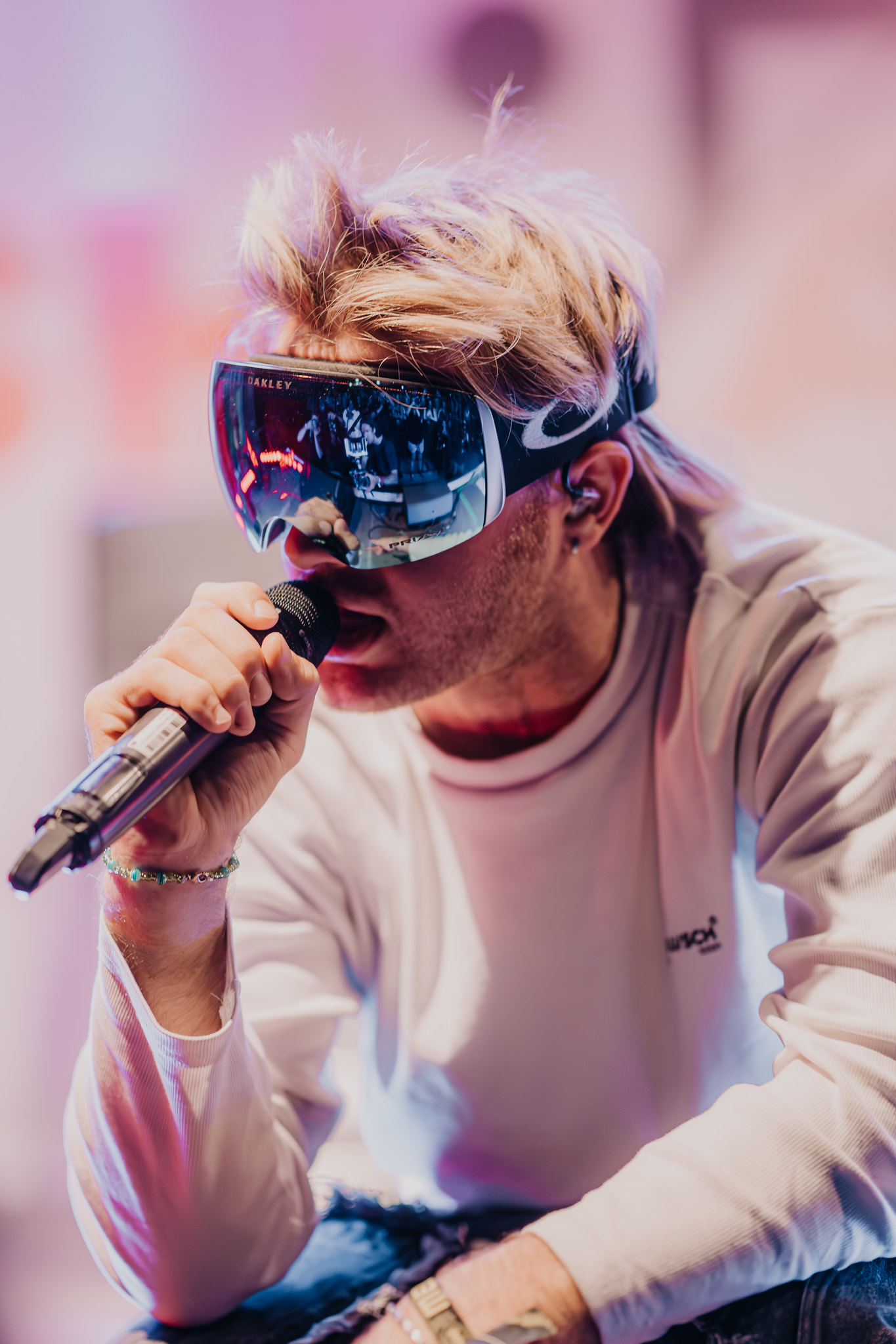
- Ski Aggu performing in 2023

Background information
- Born: 3 November 1997 (age 29); Berlin-Wilmersdorf, Germany
- Genres: Hip-hop; electronic
- Occupations: Musician; rapper; singer
- Years active: 2018–present

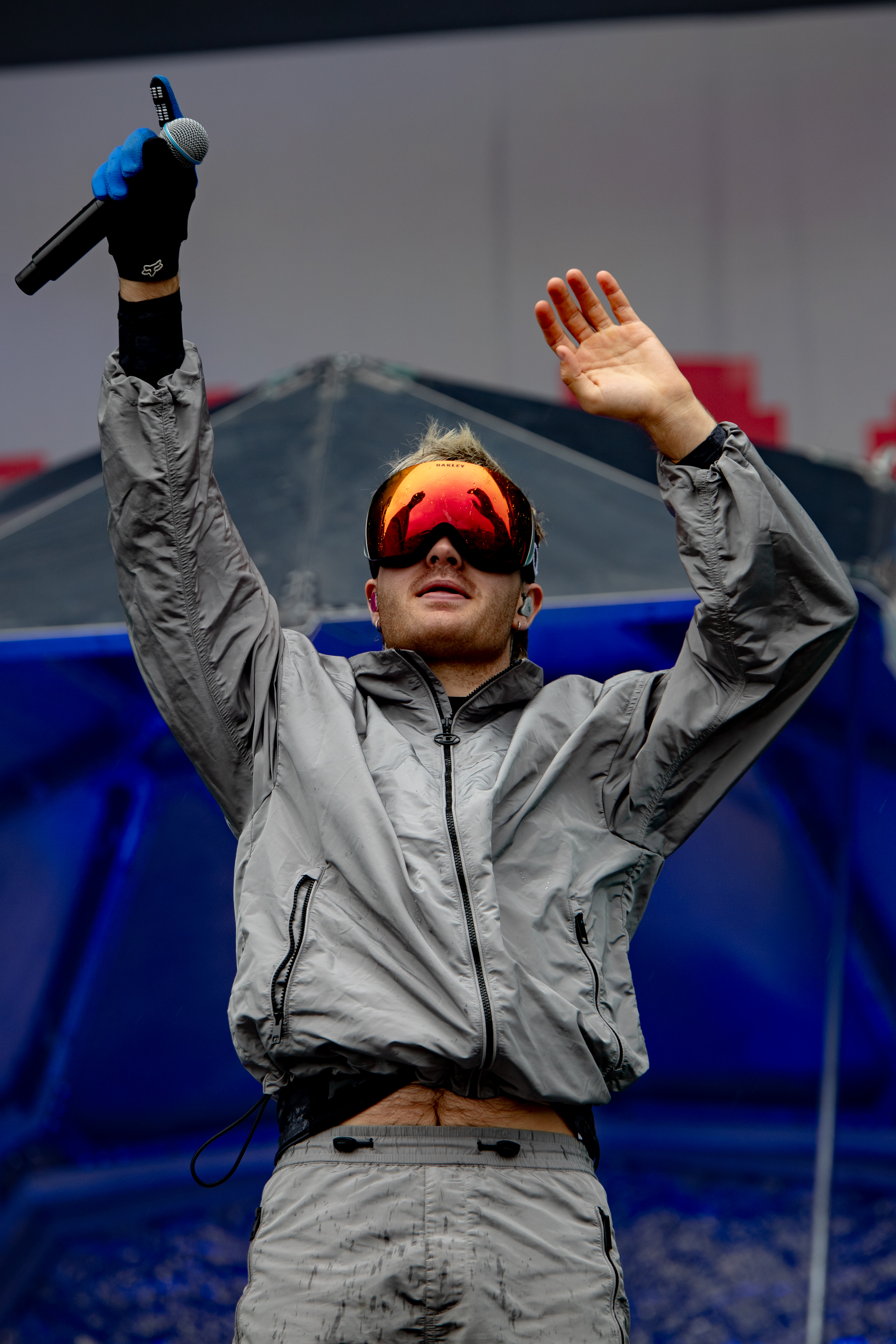
Ski Aggu at Southside Festival 2025

August Jean Diederich (born 3 November 1997) is a German musician, rapper, and singer. Diederich uses the stage name Ski Aggu. He is known for wearing ski goggles and a tracksuit in his performances and other public appearances.

Ski Aggu has released three albums: 2022 war film gewesen (2022), Denk mal drüber nach... (2023) and Wilmersdorfs Kind (2024). Several of his singles have charted in multiple countries in Europe.

== Early life ==
August Jean Diederich grew up in Berlin-Wilmersdorf. His grandfather is the SPD politician and political scientist Nils Diederich.

In a 2022 interview with Der Tagesspiegel, Diederich's stated that he lived in Ireland for an undisclosed period of time. He maintained that in Ireland he intensively practiced the martial art Brazilian Jiu-Jitsu and eventually became the national champion in his weight class.

== Music career ==
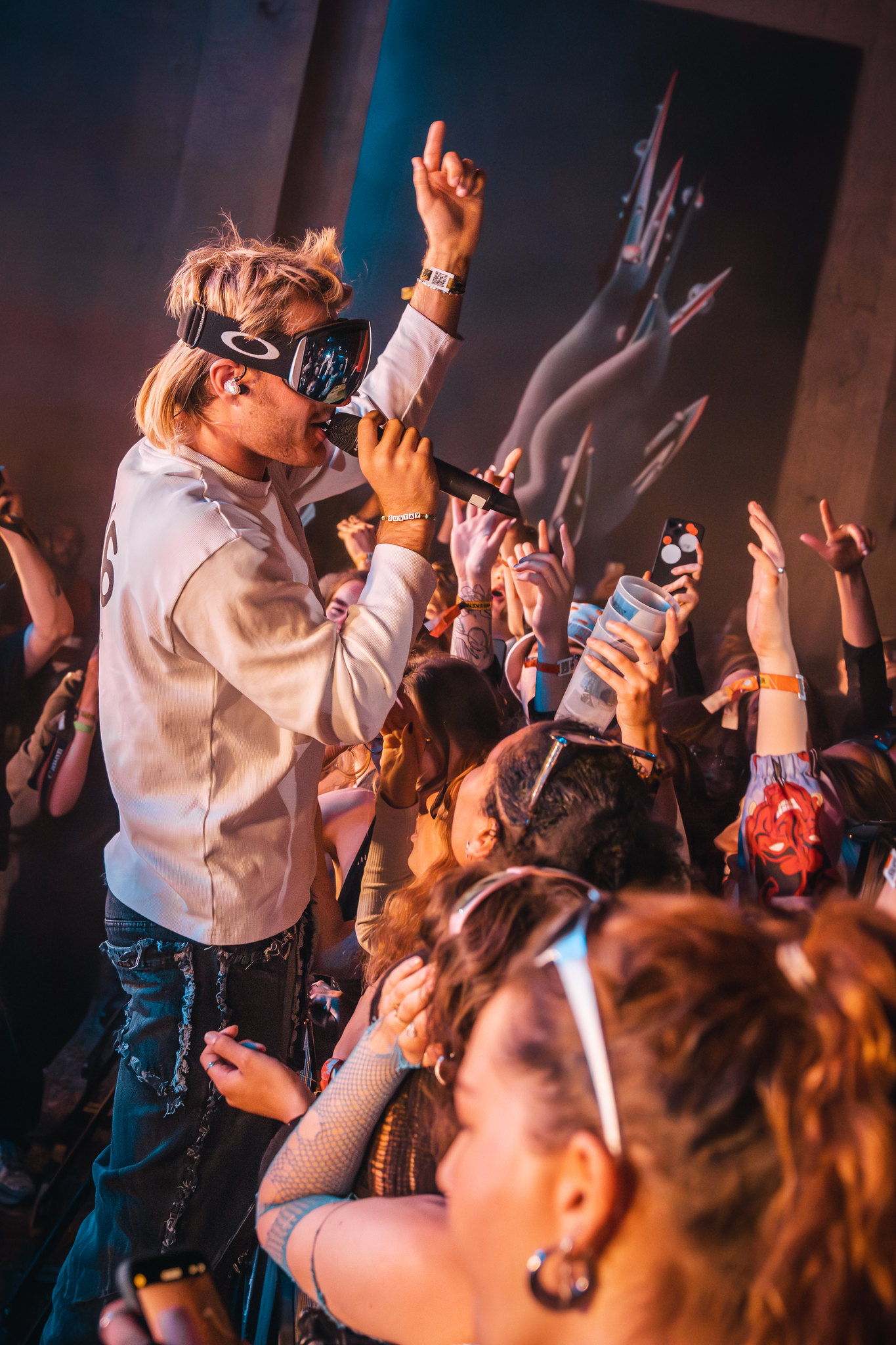
Ski Aggu performing (2023)

Ski Aggu began releasing music on SoundCloud in 2018. His early work focused on partying, though the tone was darker and more melancholic. Many of these early songs made frequent reference to West Berlin hotspots and popular night clubs, with some critics interpreting his lyrics as prescient social commentary on the daily life of young Berliners. Ritter Lean, a close childhood friend, has frequently collaborated on songs with him.

He released his first single Weißwein & Pappbecher ("Wine and Paper Cups") in 2020 during the COVID-19 pandemic. Since then, he has aimed to release new tracks on a recurring basis. His second song, Super Wavy (in collaboration with YFG Pave), remained his most streamed song on Spotify until the release of "Party Sahne" in 2022.

After focusing on club performances in the summer of 2021, Ski Aggu prioritised appearances at outdoor festivals a year later, in Germany and Austria. Among his 2022 appearances were the Heroes Festival in Geiselwind, splash!, Poolbar Festival and Frequency.

For the track "Hubba Bubba" released in September 2022, he collaborated with Berlin music producer Southstar. One month later, he released "Party Sahne" ("Party Cream"), which featured producers Endzone and Ericson. The song, which samples the melody from the song "Jerk It Out" by the Swedish band Caesars, reached number 32 on the German Singles Chart. It has retrospectively been characterised by entertainment media as his career breakthrough. A June 2024 profile of Ski Aggu in Sleek Magazine noted that following the release of "Party Sahne" he began to perform in larger venues and receive greater exposure by artists for song collaborations. In November and December 2022, Ski Aggu performed first tour, Aprés Ski, appearing in cities across German-speaking areas of Europe.

On 2 December 2022, Ski Aggu released his debut album 2022 war Film gewesen (2022 was a movie) which included four new songs. In his review of the album, Yannik Gölz from Laut.de wrote that Ski Aggu "has an ear for vibes and knows that he does not have to spell out the impact of his music". Gölz stated that while songs felt like filler tracks, the album contained "too much good music to ignore", and overall constituted "a quite interesting statement". The reviewer rated the album four out of five stars.

On 25 May 2023, the single "Friesenjung" was released in collaboration with Dutch rapper Joost Klein and German comedian Otto Waalkes. The song is a reinterpretation of Waalkes' original and reached number one on the singles charts in Germany and Austria. The single appeared on his second album Denk mal drüber nach (Think It Over) which he released later that year.

Ski Aggu released his third studio album on 30 August 2024, Wilmersdorfs Kind (Child of Wilmersdorf), which consists of 17 tracks. A number of singles featured on the album reached high positions on charts in Germany, including "Balla Balla", "Deutschland" (recorded in collaboration with German artist Ikkimel), and "Bye x3" (in collaboration with German pop group Jeremias).

== Influences and interests ==
Diederich's interest in martial arts is reflected on his social media platforms and in music videos, in which he frequently poses in fighting stances. Outside of music, Diederich follows the football clubs Hertha BSC, Napoli and Celtic FC, and has been seen wearing these teams' jerseys.

== Discography ==
=== Studio albums ===
List of studio albums, with selected chart positions and details
Title	Details	Peak chart positions				Certifications
Title	Details	GER	AUT	NLD	SWI	Certifications
2022 war Film gewesen	Released: 1 December 2022; Label: Jungeratze; Formats: Digital download, streaming	85	—	—	—	
Denk mal drüber nach...	Released: 12 October 2023; Label: Jungeratze; Formats: Digital download, streaming	1	3	60	8	BVMI: Gold
Wilmersdorfs Kind	Released: 29 August 2024; Label: Jungeratze; Formats: Digital download, streaming	1	1	—	2	
Ski Aggu Musik	Released: 15 October 2026; Label: Jungeratze; Formats: Digital download, streaming	1	3	—	3	
"—" denotes an album that did not chart or was not released in that territory.

=== Extended plays ===
Title	Details
Wir haben zwei geile songs gemacht (with Filow)	Released: 29 August 2024; Label: 1UP; Formats: Digital download, streaming

=== Singles ===
==== Charted singles ====
List of charting singles, with selected peak chart positions
Title	Year	Peak chart positions									Certifications	Album or EP
Title	Year	GER	AUT	LAT Stream.	LTU	NLD	POL Stream.	SWE	SWI	WW Excl. US	Certifications	Album or EP
"Party Sahne" (with Endzone and Ericson)	2022	32	47	—	—	—	—	—	—	—	IFPI AUT: Platinum; BVMI: Platinum; IFPI SWI: Gold	2022 war Film gewesen
"Tour de Berlin" (with Domiziana and Replay Okay)	2022	58	—	—	—	—	—	—	—	—		2022 war Film gewesen
"Broker" (with Dauner)	2023	50	—	—	—	—	—	—	—	—		Denk mal drüber nach...
"Mandala"	2023	45	—	—	—	—	—	—	—	—		Denk mal drüber nach...
"Friesenjung" (with Joost Klein and Otto Waalkes)	2023	1	1	1	1	18	84	100	7	115	IFPI AUT: Platinum; BVMI: Platinum; ZPAV: Gold; IFPI SWI: Gold	Denk mal drüber nach...
"Mietfrei" (with Sira)	2023	5	22	—	—	—	—	—	36	—	BVMI: Gold	Denk mal drüber nach...
"Theater★" (with Soho Bani)	2023	5	7	—	—	—	—	—	20	—		Denk mal drüber nach...
"Gensehaut"	2023	24	41	—	—	—	—	—	81	—		Denk mal drüber nach...
"Maximum Rizz"	2023	18	34	—	—	—	—	—	71	—		Denk mal drüber nach...
"Nicht nachmachen!!" (with Monk and Longus Mongus)	2023	14	19	—	—	—	—	—	44	—		Denk mal drüber nach...
"Z0rnig"	2024	1	12	—	—	—	—	—	52	—		Wilmersdorfs Kind
"Balla Balla"	2024	55	—	—	—	—	—	—	—	—		Wilmersdorfs Kind
"Deutschland 🇩🇪" (with Ikkimel)	2024	18	26	—	—	—	—	—	—	—		Wilmersdorfs Kind
"Abgelenkt"	2024	44	—	—	—	—	—	—	—	—		Wilmersdorfs Kind
"Flasche kreist" (with 01099)	2024	23	50	—	—	—	—	—	51	—		Kinder der Nacht
"Bye x3" (with Jeremias)	2024	40	51	—	—	—	—	—	—	—		Wilmersdorfs Kind
"Immer" (with Makko)	2024	5	9	—	—	—	—	—	34	—		Wilmersdorfs Kind
"Belohnen" (with Filly, Bausa, and Bunt.)	2024	44	60	—	—	—	—	—	—	—		Non-album singles
"Kein DJ"	2024	88	—	—	—	—	—	—	—	—		Non-album singles
"NPCs" (with Ritter Lean)	2025	75	—	—	—	—	—	—	—	—		Stell dir vor
"Übersee freistil"	2025	69	—	—	—	—	—	—	—	—		Non-album singles
"Germany" (with Dauner and Ikkimel featuring Barré)	2025	77	—	—	—	—	—	—	—	—		Non-album singles
"Palermo"	2025	26	39	—	—	—	—	—	—	—		Non-album singles
"Jung und laut" (with Badchieff and Sira)	2025	71	—	—	—	—	—	—	—	—		Non-album singles
"Sonne geht auf" (with Klangkuenstler)	2025	82	—	—	—	—	—	—	—	—		Non-album singles
"Geld"	2026	51	63	—	—	—	—	—	—	—		Ski Aggu Musik
"Spring" (with Mr. Polska and Natte Visstick)	2026	50	50	—	—	—	—	—	—	—		Ski Aggu Musik
"Verschwommen" (with Ericson)	2026	1	4	—	—	—	—	—	16	—		Ski Aggu Musik
"—" denotes a recording that did not chart or was not released in that territory.

==== As featured artist ====
Title	Year	Peak chart positions				Certifications	Album or EP
Title	Year	GER	AUT	LUX	SWI	Certifications	Album or EP
"Kosmonauten" (Bibiza featuring Ski Aggu)	2021	—	—	—	—		Zwei Zöpfe auf dem Kopf
"Blau" (OMG featuring Ski Aggu)	2022	—	—	—	—		Non-album single
"Ghetto Tekkno" (Endzone featuring Ski Aggu)	2023	88	—	—	—		Welcome to the Endzone
"Anders" (01099 featuring Ski Aggu)	2023	9	18	—	25	BVMI: Gold	Blaue Stunden
"Liebe Grüsse" (RAF Camora featuring Ski Aggu)	2023	1	1	19	2	IFPI AUT: Platinum; BVMI: Gold	XV RR Edition
"Huso" (Ritter Lean featuring Ski Aggu)	2023	51	—	—	—		Ob ein Atze fliegen kann
"Schwarzer Toyota" (Skrt Cobain featuring Ski Aggu and Mark Forster)	2024	9	11	—	55		Non-album single
"Wie du manchmal fehlst" (Zartmann featuring Ski Aggu and Dauner)	2024	6	13	—	31	IFPI AUT: Gold; BVMI: Gold	Dafür bin ich frei
"Junge Baller" (6PM Records featuring Ski Aggu, Haaland936, and Sira)	2024	4	8	—	21		Non-album singles
"Pa aufs Maul" (Stefan Raab featuring Sido and Ski Aggu)	2024	84	—	—	—		Non-album singles
"Atzen & Barbies" (Shirin David featuring Ski Aggu)	2025	3	6	—	20		Schlau aber blond
"Bissu dumm¿ Megalodon Remix" (Bonez MC featuring Ski Aggu and various artists)	2025	8	15	—	19		Non-album single
"—" denotes a recording that did not chart or was not released in that territory.

==== Other singles ====
Title	Year	Album or EP
"Weißwein & Pappbecher"	2020	Non-album singles
"Super Wavy" (with YFG Pave)	2020	Non-album singles
"Ski Aggu Typebeat"	2021	Non-album singles
"Früchtetee (mit Honig)"	2021	Non-album singles
"Privnote" (with Seza)	2021	Non-album singles
"Float Away" (with GB Conte)	2021	Non-album singles
"Schachbrett"	2021	Non-album singles
"Skpaden"	2021	Non-album singles
"Gustav" (with Prodbypengg)	2021	Non-album singles
"Partyticker"	2022	2022 war Film gewesen
"Makrodosis" (with Dj Schinkensuppe)	2022	2022 war Film gewesen
"Acid Kotti"	2022	2022 war Film gewesen
"Hubba Bubba"	2022	2022 war Film gewesen
"Besoffen in den Spiegel schauen" (with Drumla)	2022	2022 war Film gewesen
"Nein schatz" (with Miss Bashful and GDA)	2025	Non-album singles
"1 Adler" (with GDA)	2026	Non-album singles
"GTI Function"	2026	Non-album singles
"Hardtekk Tutorial" (with DJ Törke and Mr. Polska)	2026	Non-album singles

=== Other charted songs ===
Title	Year	Peak chart positions			Album or EP
Title	Year	GER	AUT	SWI	Album or EP
"Nicht nachmachen!!" (featuring Longus Mongus and Monk)	2023	14	19	44	Denk mal drüber nach...
"Kappies im Slip" (featuring DBBD and Shoki)	2023	— (Note: "Kappies im Slip" did not enter the official German Top 100 Singles chart, but peaked at No. 5 on the German Single Trending Charts.)	—	—	Denk mal drüber nach...
"—" denotes a recording that did not chart or was not released in that territory.
