= Bunte Republik Neustadt =

Micronation in Dresden, Germany

The Bunte Republik Neustadt (German: literally "Colourful Republic of Neustadt") was a micronation in Dresden in Germany, in parts of the city's district Dresden-Neustadt, from 1990 to 1993; nowadays every year in June a 3-day cultural festival is celebrated there under the same name.

== Street festival ==
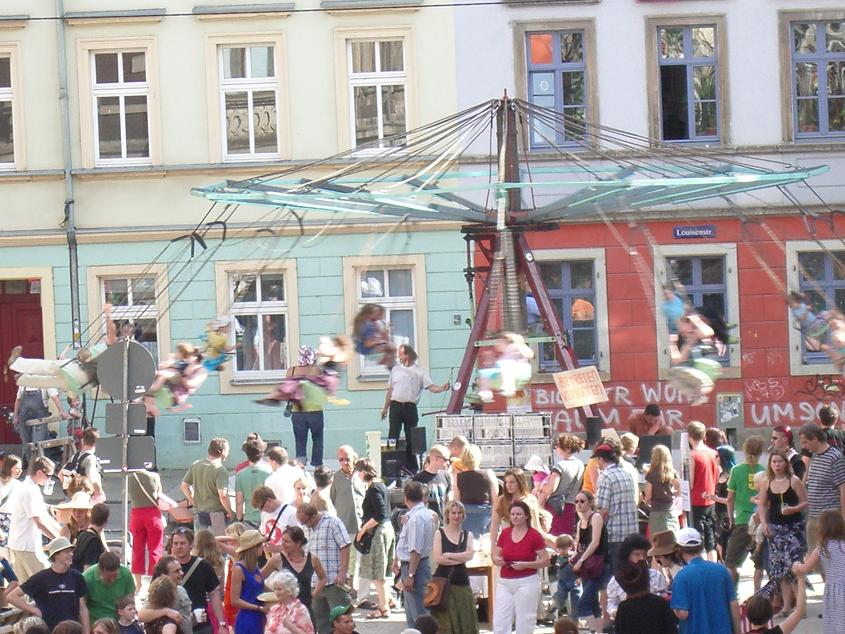
BRN festival, 2006

Nowadays during the annual festival, certain streets are closed off, with vendors selling food and drink, DJs and live bands playing music, and various other performances. To prevent the festival become too commercial only residents, clubs and bars that are home in the festival area are permitted to sell drinks and food on the streets. Attractions and events are applied by a lot of locals to the regulatory authority and there is no organising host.

The festival draws large crowds from all walks of life. In 2006, more than 150,000 people attended, and over 100 bands played in the streets and parks of this area, with a total of more than 1000 artists participating. The two nights of the festival can be interpreted as a large house and street party with several stages and balcony-raves which tens of thousands of people attend.

Since 2001, as a result of several festival overshadowed by rioting, beverages sold in glass bottles is forbidden; the festival usually occurs under a strong police presence while it rested easy in recent years.

== See also ==
- Freetown Christiania
- Užupis
