= Äußere Neustadt =

- Quarter of Dresden
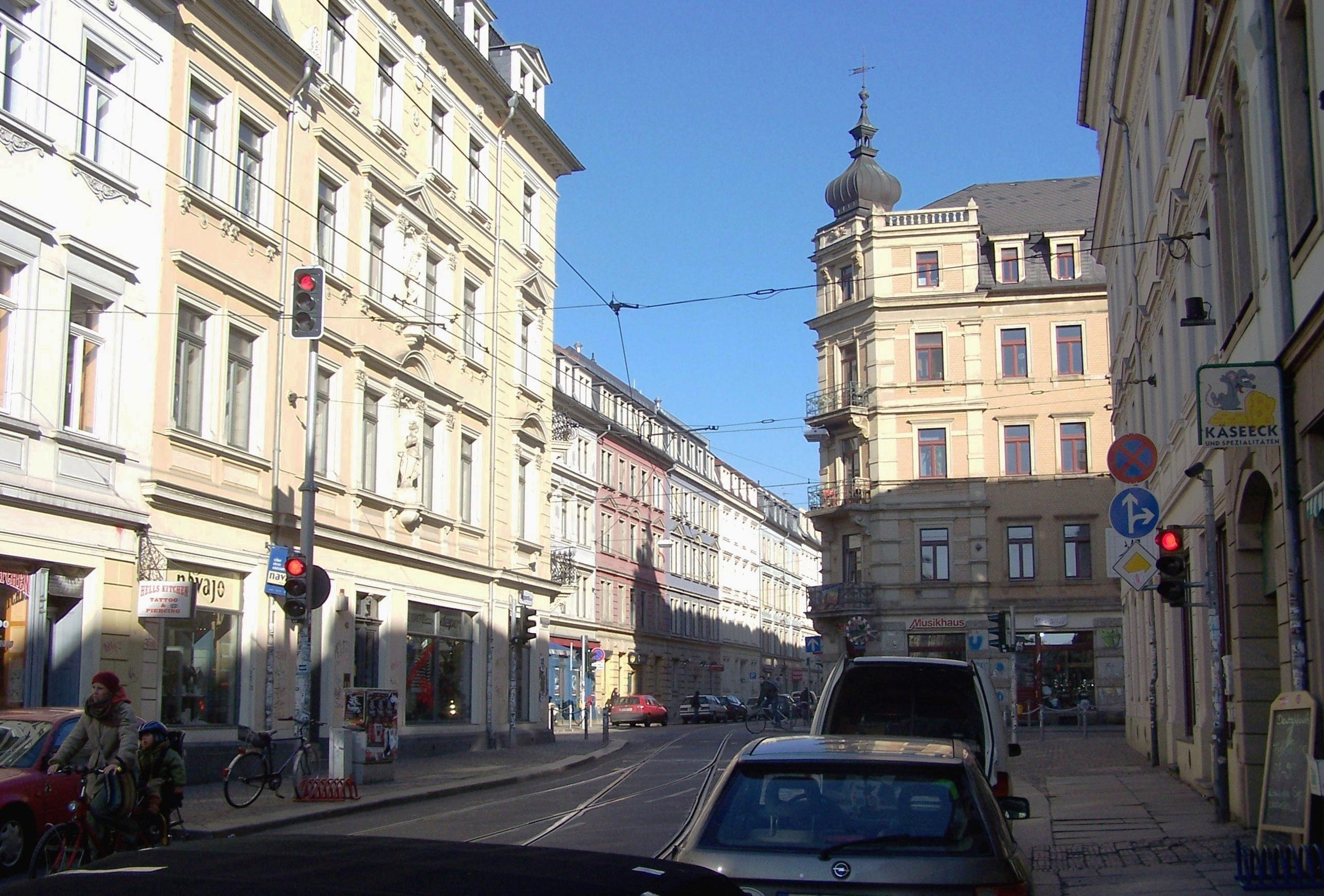
- Junction Rothenburger-/Louisenstraße (Assi-Eck)

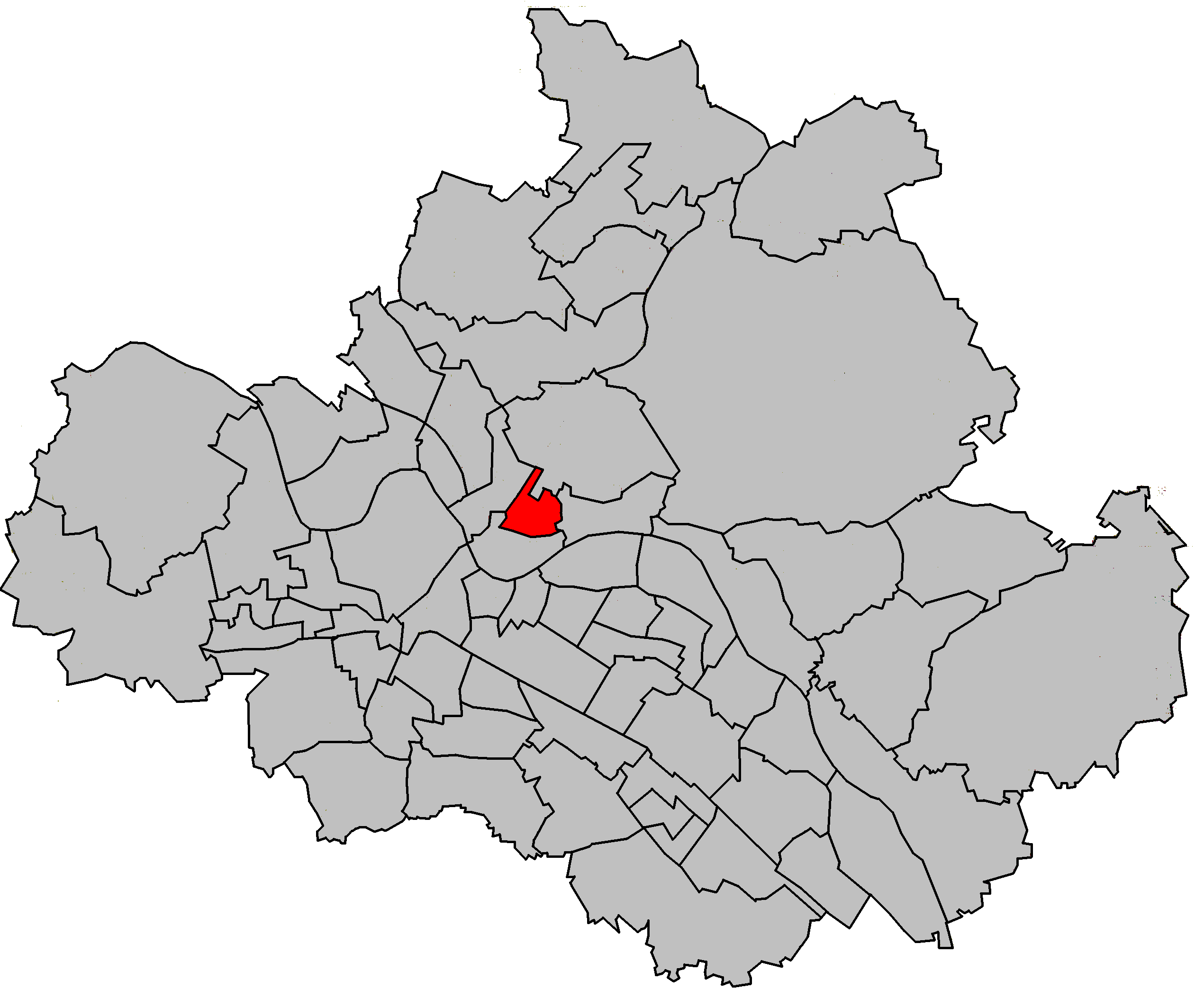
- Location of Äußere Neustadt in Dresden
- Interactive map of Äußere Neustadt
- Location within Germany Location within Saxony
- Coordinates: 51°4′N 13°45′E
- Country: Germany
- State: Saxony
- District: Urban district
- City: Dresden
- Borough: Neustadt

Area
  - Total: 1.14 km^{2} (0.44 sq mi)

Population (2020-12-31)
  - Total: 18,098
  - Density: 15,900/km^{2} (41,100/sq mi)
- Time zone: UTC+01:00 (CET)
  - Summer (DST): UTC+02:00 (CEST)
- Vehicle registration: DD

Äußere Neustadt (German pronunciation: [ˈɔʏsəʁə ˈnɔʏʃtat], lit. 'Outer New Town'), also known as Antonstadt after Anthony (German: Anton), King of Saxony, is a neighborhood in Dresden, Germany. The Äußere Neustadt contains the part of the Neustadt that is located outside of where the old city walls used to be. Today the area is known for its thriving bars and clubs.

== Location ==
The Äußere Neustadt is bounded by Bautzener Straße and Albertplatz to the south, Königsbrücker Straße to the west, the street Bischofsweg and Alaunpark to the north, and the Prießnitz river to the east. These, however, are the official borders. Many people consider the neighborhood of Hecht to be part of the Äußere Neustadt even though it technically belongs to the Leipziger Vorstadt.

== Traffic ==
Äußere Neustadt is not far away from Bahnhof Dresden-Neustadt which is the second largest train station in Dresden. This station grants access to the ICE network.

A number of tramlines serve the Äußere Neustadt. Albertplatz at the southern border is the most important hub in Dresden north of the Elbe. One of the few single track sections in Dresden is in the quarter due to its cramped streets.

== History ==
The streets have remained mostly the same since they were originally laid out in 1745. Among the first businesses to emerge in the area were a casting house and an alum boilery (Alaunstraße gets its name from the German word for alum). The world's first milk chocolate was produced in 1839 in a factory opened in between modern-day Timaeusstraße and Jordanstraße by Gottfried Heinrich Christoph Jordan and August Friedrich Christian Timaeus.

The area boomed in the late 19th century, when many of its characteristic buildings were erected. Today, it is one of the largest urban areas in Germany with enclosed Wilhelminian-era architecture. This has much to do with the fact that the Äußere Neustadt was not greatly affected by the bombing of Dresden in World War II.

The festival known as Bunte Republik Neustadt ("The Colorful Republic of Neustadt" a play on Bundesrepublik Deutschland, the German name of the federal republic of Germany) has taken place every year since 1990 in the Äußere Neustadt. It has become East Germany's largest city festival with more than 150,000 visitors in 2006.

== Attractions ==
=== Martin Luther Church ===
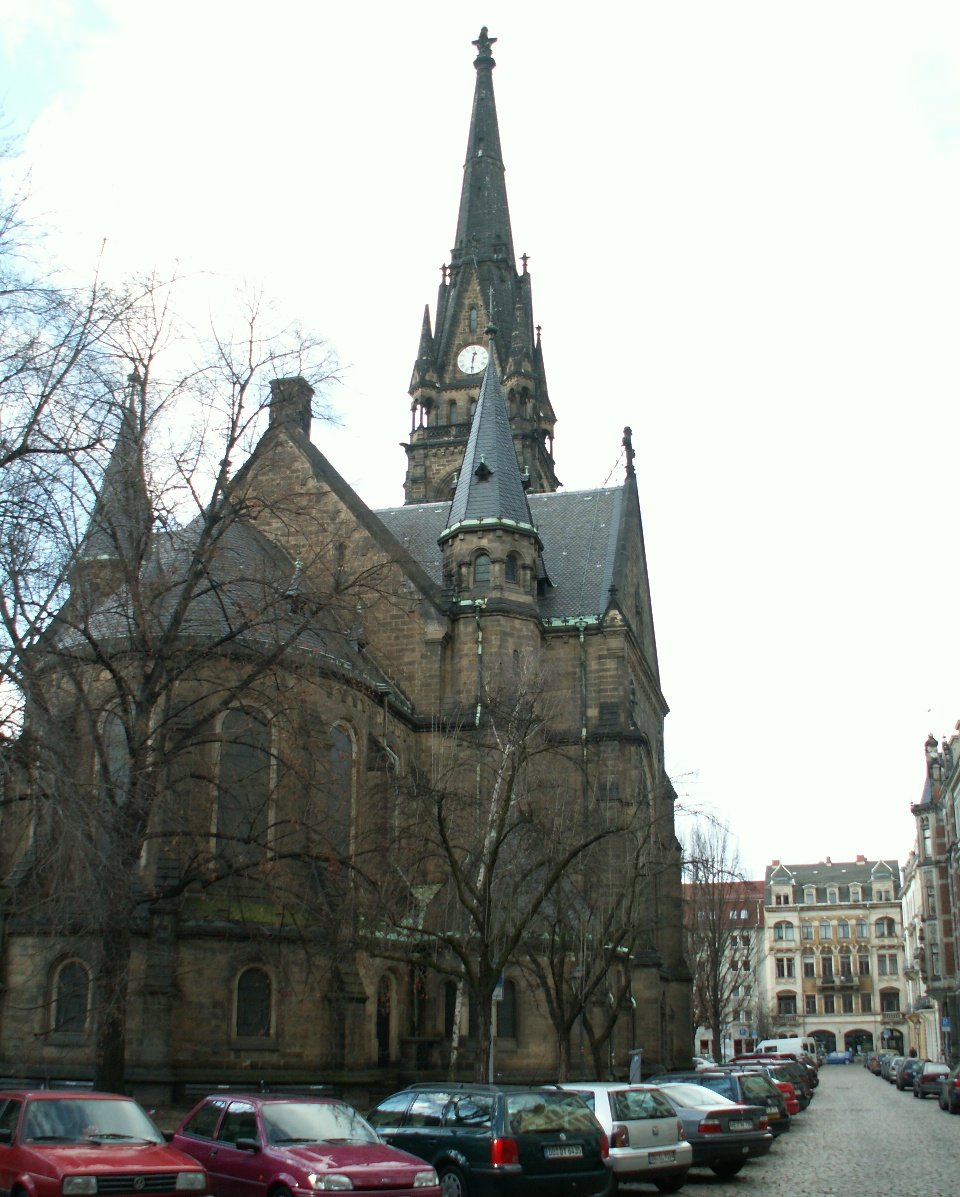
Martin Luther church

Located on Martin-Luther-Platz, built from 1883 to 1887. With both Romanesque arches and Gothic proportions, the church exterior is an example of historicism. The tower is 81 meters high.

=== Pfund's dairy ===
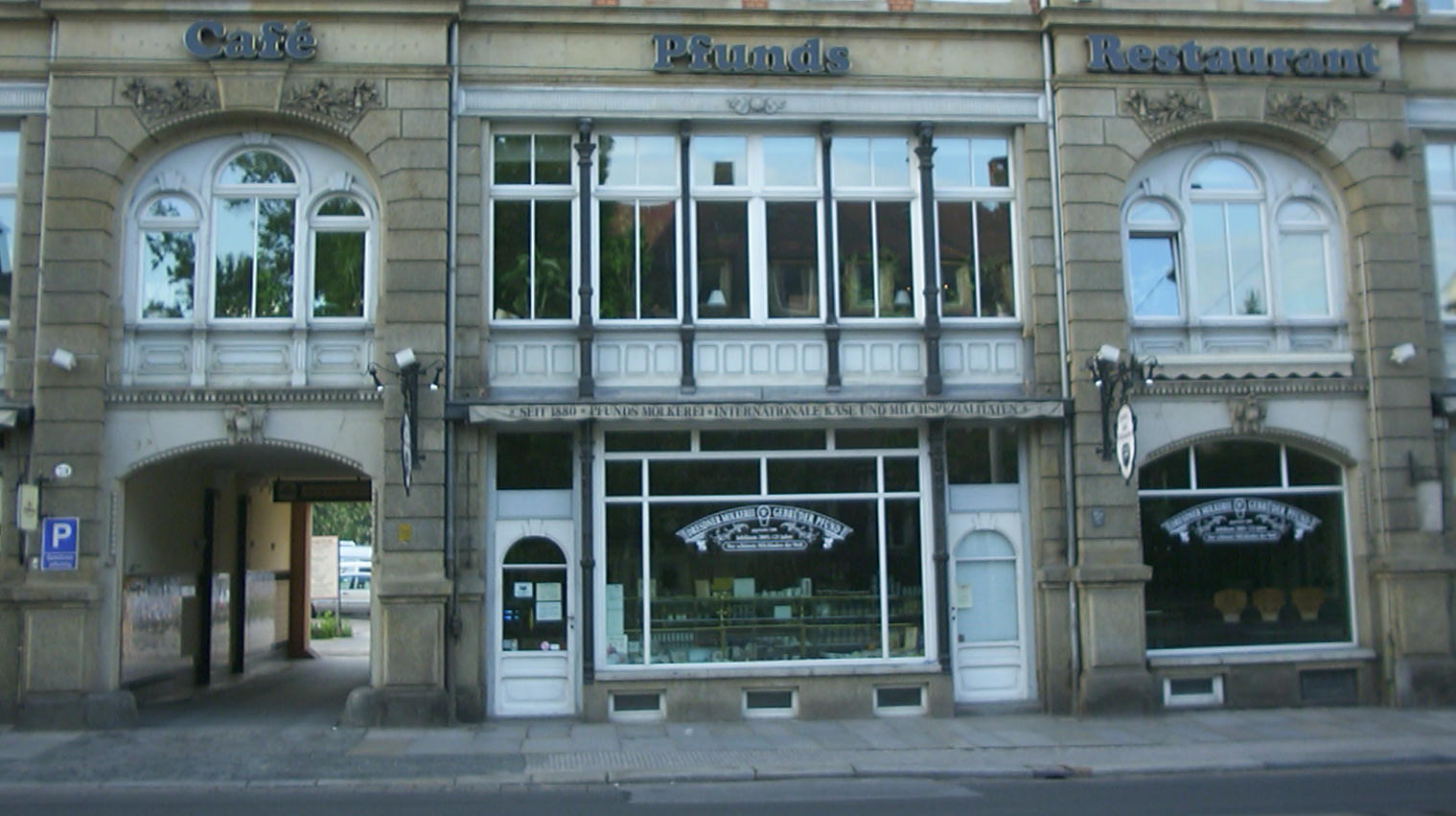
Exterior of Pfund's Dairy

One of Dresden's most popular tourist attractions. Decorated with neo-Renaissance porcelain tiles made by Villeroy & Boch, it is known as the world's most beautiful dairy.

=== Old Jewish cemetery ===
Located on Pulsnitzer Straße near Martin-Luther-Platz. Established in 1751, it is the oldest Jewish cemetery in Saxony. A new cemetery was established for the Jewish population of Dresden in the neighborhood of Johannstadt in 1869.

=== Kunsthofpassage ===
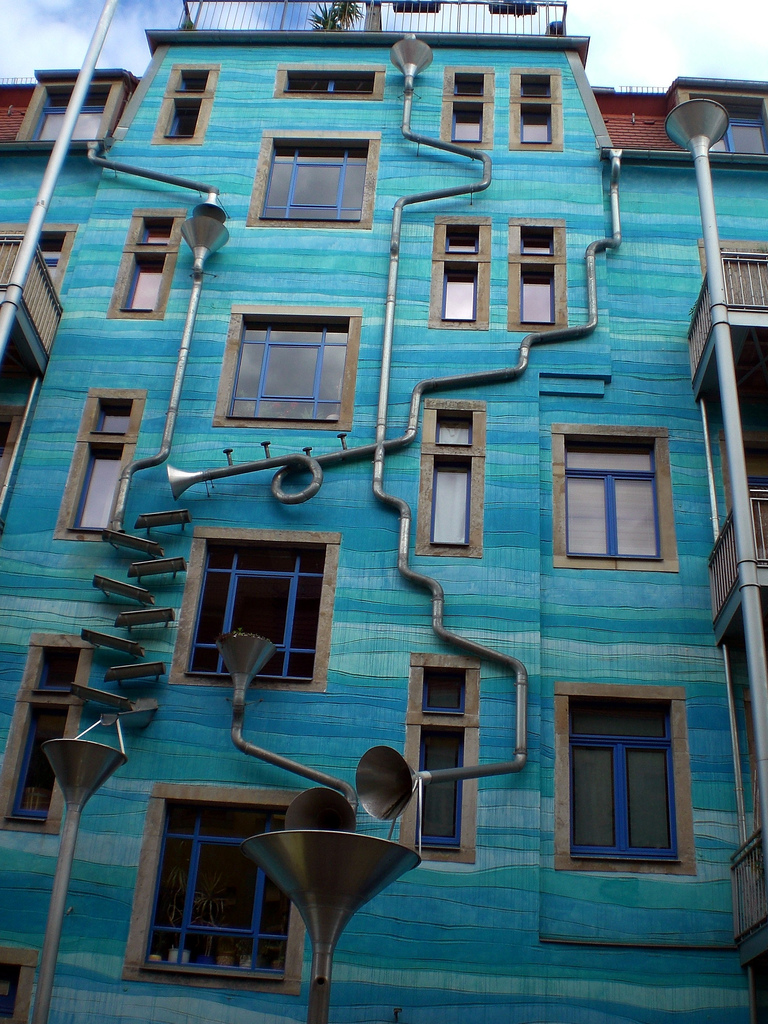
Creative architecture in the Kunsthofpassage. Visible are the singing drain pipes of the "funnel wall"

The Kunsthofpassage, located right off Görlitzer Straße, is a complex of buildings whose 5 courtyards contain interesting artwork and decoration, one of which plays musical notes powered by raindrops. The passage contains small boutiques, galleries, bookstores, and cafes.

=== Nordbad ===
Dresden's only historical bathhouse. Although it was temporarily closed from 1974 to 1992, it is once again open for business. The bath itself is 8 meters wide and 16 meters long.

=== Panama Adventure Playground ===
Neustadt contains a special attraction for children – the Panama Adventure Playground. Children between 6 and 16 are welcome to come and interact with horses, sheep and other animals. Panama was designed as a 'playground within the city', and as such is located in the middle of the block bounded by Görlitzer, Kamenzer, Sebnitzer and Louisen Streets.

== Nightlife ==
The Äußere Neustadt is thought to have one of the liveliest bar scenes in all of Germany, with high concentration of bars, clubs, and cafes.
