= Money Boy =

Austrian rap-singer (born 1981)

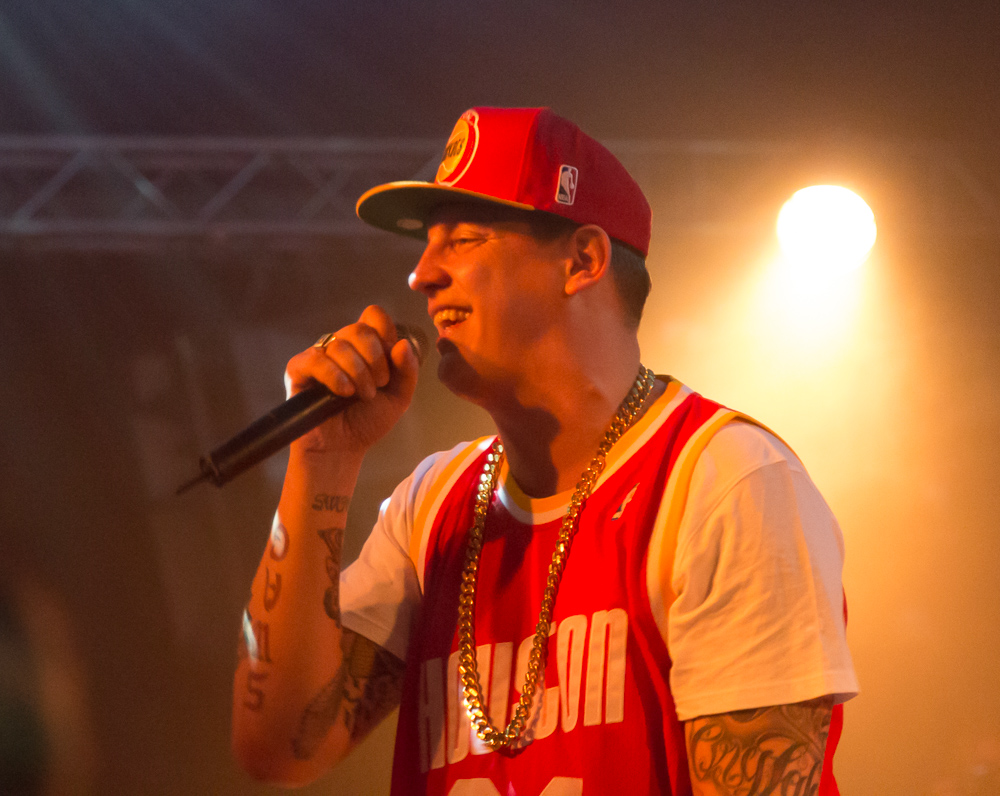
- Money Boy performing in 2015

Background information
- Born: Sebastian Meisinger; June 27, 1981 (age 44); Vienna, Austria
- Origin: Rudolfsheim-Fünfhaus, Vienna
- Genres: Hip hop; pop; trap; pop rap; rock
- Occupations: Rapper; singer
- Years active: 2010−present
- Label: Swag City Clique
- Website: www.gloupdinerogang.com

Sebastian Meisinger (born June 27, 1981 in Vienna), better known by his stage name Money Boy, is an Austrian rapper and singer. He became famous with his hit "Dreh den Swag auf".

== Biography ==
Money Boy grew up in the 15th district of Vienna, Rudolfsheim-Fünfhaus. By 2008, he studied journalism and communication at the University of Vienna. He graduated with the degree Magister philosophiae. His master's thesis was about gangsta rap in Germany. Before starting with rap, he played basketball for a long time. He initially wrote his lyrics in English. After his first public title, Ching, Chang, Chung, Money Boy caught attention in late summer 2010 after publishing his cover Version of Soulja Boy's Turn My Swag On; Dreh den Swag auf.

Dreh den Swag auf by Money Boy

In 2015, he performed with members of the Glo Up Dinero Gang at the sold out VideoDays, including an ambiguous statement about recreational drug use at the end of his performance: "Drugs are bad, I confess that shit; but I am high, so I have no problems with it." (Note: German original statement: "Drogen sind schlecht, ich gesteh' den shit; aber ich bin high, also habe ich keine Probleme damit.")

== Glo Up Dinero Gang ==
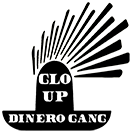
Logo

He founded the Glo Up Dinero Gang, a gang that features various artists with a similar style and image; some of the more known artists include Spinning 9. Hustensaft Jüngling (Cough Syrup Youngster) and Medikamenten Manfred (Medication Manfred).

== Discography ==
=== Albums ===
- 2013: SWAG
- 2014: HiTunes
- 2015: Cash Flow
- 2016: Alles Ist Designer
- 2018: Mann unter Feuer
- 2019: Quick Mart
- 2019: Geld Motivierte Muzik
- 2020: Dripolympics
- 2020: Feed The Skreetz
- 2021: The Plug
- 2021: 10 Bullets
- 2022: Back in der Trap
- 2022: The Lost Tape II
- 2024: Der Pimp im purple Pelzmantel
- 2024: SWAGSGIVING
- 2025: Unfinished Business
- 2025: Fortune 500
- 2025: The Lost Tape IV

=== EPs ===
- 2013: Trap Haus
- 2024: Der Eagle ist gelandet

=== Singles ===
- 2010: X-Mas Time
- 2011: Dreh den Swag auf (Club Remix)
- 2013: Swaghetti Yolonese
- 2013: Yolohafte Swagnachten
- 2014: Einer Geht Noch
- 2014: Gay C D.B.n.C.

== Sources ==
- Kronen Zeitung
- Vice
- Vice
- Vice
- Vice
- Musik Express
- Express
- Vienna Online
- Heute
- Vienna Online
