= Frauenarzt =

German rapper from Berlin

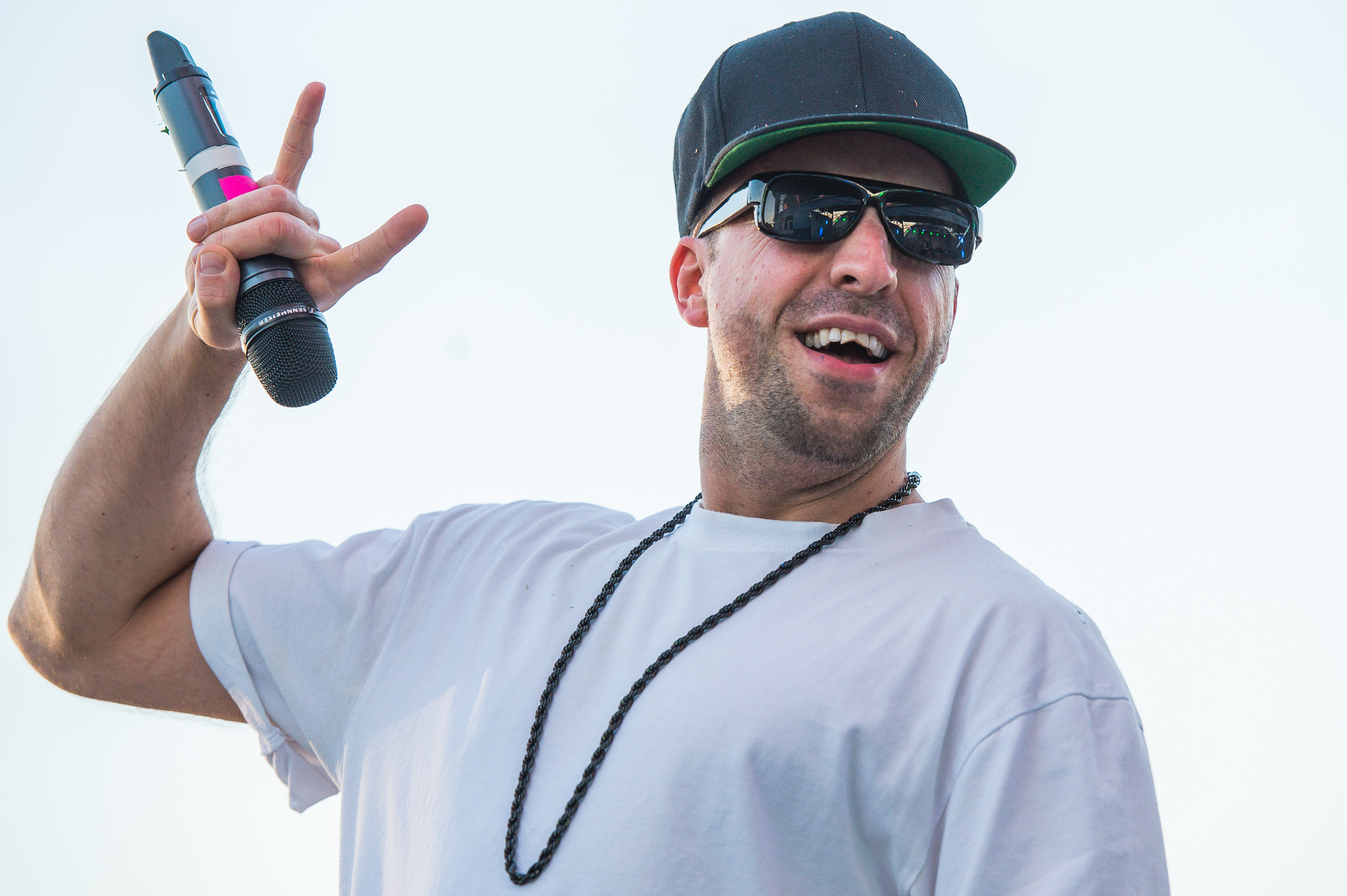
- Frauenarzt in 2016

Background information
- Born: Vincente de Teba Költerhoff; 18 October 1978 (age 47); Berlin, East Germany
- Occupations: MC, DJ, rapper
- Labels: Atzen Musik (formerly "Ghetto Musik"), Bassboxxx, Berlin Crime
- Website: Frauenarzt on Twitter; Frauenarzt on Facebook

Vincente de Teba Költerhoff (born 18 October 1978), known professionally as Frauenarzt (German for "gynaecologist", literally "The Women's Doctor"), is a German rapper from Berlin, also known as "DJ Kologe", "MC Digital F", "Arzt", "Gynniko" or "Günther". Frauenarzt was known for his sexually explicit, Miami bass style music. Since 2008, he began to produce Ghetto Tech songs, together with Manny Marc as duo Die Atzen.

In 2009, the duo got their breakthrough with the hit single "Das geht ab", following that with "Disco Pogo".

In 2014, Frauenarzt published the albums R.A.P (as DJ Monoton K & MC Digital F – DJ Korx and Frauenarzt) and Tanga Tanga 3, attaching to his two earlier released albums Tanga Tanga (2000) and Tanga Tanga 2003. The same year, he announced his new solo album for the year 2015.

== Charts and sales ==
His song "Das geht ab" with Manny Marc was the 23rd-best-selling single in Germany of 2009.

== Discography ==
- B.C. (1999)
- Untergrund Solo Volume 1 (2000)
- Tanga Tanga Volume 1 (2000)
- Krieg mit uns (with DJ Korx) (2001)
- Unveröffentlichte Untergrund-Hits (2002)
- Porno Party (with Mr. Long) (2002)
- Tanga Tanga 2003 (2003)
- Untergrund Solo Volume 2 (2003)
- Untergrund Solo Volume 2 (zerhackt und runtergeschraubt) (2005)
- Berlin bleibt Untergrund – Das Album (with Manny Marc) (2005)
- Berlin bleibt Untergrund – Das Mixtape (with Manny Marc) (2005)
- Mehr Kohle Atzen machen Ärger (with Chucky & Smoky) (2005)
- B.C. – Neuauflage (2005)
- Tanga Tanga Volume 1 – Neuauflage (2005)
- Untergrund Solo Volume 1 – Neuauflage (2005)
- Porno Party 2 (with Mr. Long) (2005)
- Der Untergrundkönig (2005)
- Krieg mit uns – Neuauflage (with DJ Korx) (2006)
- Porno Mafia (with King Orgasmus One) (2006)
- Brennt den Club ab – Seine größten Hits (2006)
- Geschäft ist Geschäft (2006)
- Hart an der Grenze (with Manny Marc) (2006)
- Jetzt reicht's!!! (2007)
- Dr.Sex (2007)
- Dr.Sex Bonus Edition (2007)
- Feiern mit den Pleitegeiern (with Manny Marc) (2008)
- Feuchte Träume (2008)
- Atzen Musik Vol. 1 (with Manny Marc) (2008)
- Atzen Musik Vol. 1 (Ltd. DJ Mix edition) (with Manny Marc) (2009)
- Untergrund (as "Arzt" with Blokk) (2010)
- Atzen Musik Vol. 2 (with Manny Marc) (2010)
- Party Chaos (with Manny Marc) (2011)
- Atzen Musik Vol. 3 (with Manny Marc) (2012)
- Mutterficker (2016)
- MC Digital F VS Sonny Techno (2020)
- Extasy (with Bonez MC)
- Blood (with Sonny Techno)
- Tag Team (Also with Bonez MC)

Singles

- T-shirt und Jeans (2005)
- Florida Lady (with Manny Marc and Alexander Marcus) (2008)
- Das Geht Ab! (with Manny Marc) (2009)
- Wir sind in (with Ren Da Gemini) (eSingle) (2009)
- Disco Pogo (with Manny Marc) (2010)
- Atzin (with Manny Marc) (2010)

DVDs

- Berlin Untergrund (with DJ Korx) (2003)
- Berlin bleibt hart Tour (Amstaff & Mehr Kohle Records) (2006)

== See also ==
- Filow, with whom Frauenarzt performed a song
