= Kuryu Rakusen-en Sanatorium =

Coordinates: 36°37′05″N 138°37′35″E

National Sanatorium Kuryū Rakusen-en

Geography
- Location: 647, Kusatsu Otsu Kusatsu, Gunma, Japan

Organisation
- Care system: HealthCare of those who had leprosy
- Type: National hospital run by Ministry of Health, Labour and Welfare (Japan)

Services

History
- Opened: 1932

Links
- Website: http://www.hosp.go.jp/~kuryu/index.html
- Lists: Hospitals in Japan

Kuryū Rakusen-en Sanatorium, or National Sanatorium Kuryū Rakusen-en is a sanatorium for leprosy or ex-leprosy patients situated at Kusatsu-machi, Azuma-gun, Gunma Prefecture in Japan, which started in 1932.

== History ==
=== Pre-Rakusen-en days ===
- 1869: There was a big fire in the Kusatsu Hot Spring. Later, a publicity book Kusatsu Onsen Shi (Kusatsu Hot Spring is good for health) circulated and by and by leprosy patients gathered around Kusatsu.
- 1888: Erwin Bälz wrote that after studying Kusatsu Hot Spring, Japanese hot springs should be used for health purposes.
- 1907: Bertrand met opposition to his plan of building a hospital in Kusatsu.
- 1913: Hannah Riddell sent the missionary Yonehara to Kusatsu.
- 1914: Koenkai (Light and salt society), a Christian group, was formed in Kusatsu.

=== Mary Cornwall-Legh ===
- 1915: Mary Cornwall-Legh inspected Kusatsu.
- 1916: Mary Cornwall-Legh started the Barnabas' mission.
- 1917: St. Barnabas' Hospital started with Dr. Kesa Hattori and Nurse Chiyo Mikami.
- 1924: Suzuran Hospital was started by Kesa Hattori and Chiyo Mikami but soon closed after the death of Hattori.
- 1929: St.Barnaba Hospital was renewed (Dr. Ichiro Tsuruta).
- 1930: The population of Yunosawa Community was 817, one third of Kusatsu.

=== Kusatsu Rakusen-en Sanatorium ===
- 1932: Kusatsu Rakusen-en Sanatorium started (director: Yoshiichi Furumi)
- 1938: Special prison "Juukanbou" Kusatsu Special Prison, was built within the sanatorium.
- 1941: St. Barnabas' Hospital was closed. 44 patients were transferred to Kusatsu Rakusen-en.
- 1947: The cruel condition of the special prison was spotlighted. The director was suspended from office.
- April 1996: The 1953 Leprosy Prevention Law was abolished.
- July 1998: The trial for compensation started.
- May 11, 2001: The trial for compensation ruled that the previous Leprosy Prevention was unconstitutional.
- May 25, 2001: The trial for compensation was confirmed. The compensation of 8 to 14 million yen was given to patients depending on the duration of unconstitutional periods.

=== Number of in-patients ===
The number of in-patients is the sum of patients which changed not only by the newly diagnosed hospitalized and those who died among in-patients, by other factors such as the number of patients who escaped or were discharged, depending on the condition of the times. Recently, they were encouraged to be discharged, but the long period of the segregation policy causing leprosy stigma might influence the number of those who went into the society.

Year	Number of in-patients
1945	1314
1950	1040
1955	1064
1960	994
1965	911
1970	811
1975	777
1980	689
1985	580
1990	477
1995	401
1999	309

Year	Number of in-patients
2003	251
2004	236
2005	223
2006	200
2007	186
2008	169

== See also ==
- Kusatsu Special Prison
