= Dürr Dental =

German company in the dental industry

DÜRR DENTAL SE
- Company type: Private company
- Genre: Medical technology
- Founded: 1941
- Headquarters: Bietigheim-Bissingen, Germany
- Key people: Martin Dürrstein, Chairman of the Management Board; Bernhard Oberschmidt, chairman of the board of Directors
- Revenue: EUR 373 million
- Members: 1.400
- Website: www.duerrdental.com

Dürr Dental is a German company in the dental industry, which was founded as a precision-mechanics workshop in Stuttgart-Feuerbach in 1941 by the brothers Karl and Wilhelm Dürr, from Gechingen close to Calw in the Schwarzwald. Today's company headquarters of the Swabian company is in Bietigheim-Bissingen, Baden-Württemberg, Germany. More than 475 employees are employed in Bietigheim-Bissingen in the areas of production and logistics, research and development, acquisition, management as well as sales and marketing. The Dürr Dental group employs more than 1,300 employees.

== History ==
=== 1941 to 1949 ===
In 1941, the brothers Karl and Wilhelm Dürr founded a precision mechanics workshop in Stuttgart-Feuerbach. After the end of the war, the workshop was reopened in Ludwigsburg. Articles for household use were produced, and they entered the field of compression technology. They entered the dental field in 1946 with the manufactured replacement parts for straight and contra-angle handpieces. The development and production of handpieces and angled instruments with water cooling was carried out a year later. In 1949, the company was registered at the IHK as the trading company K. u. W. Dürr Dental-Fabrikation, based in Ludwigsburg.

=== 1954 to 1959 ===
After the first production hall was completed there in 1954, the company headquarters were moved to the Etzelstrasse in Bietigheim (now Bietigheim-Bissingen). In 1955, the first mobile suction pump came onto the market. The pump provides more ergonomic working for the dentist. From 1956, oil-lubricated compressors were produced. The offer was expanded by small treatment units as well as polishing and suspended motors from 1957. Gechinger Motoren Werke (now Dürr Optronik) was founded in 1959 as the production facility for motors, assemblies and devices in the Swabian Gechingen in Calw in the Schwarzwald.

=== 1961 to 1969 ===
From 1961, spray mist suction machines were produced. 1964 greeted the mobile Orosuc which made seated treatment on the lying patient possible in Europe. In 1965, the first oil-free compressor, which works via the use of Teflon piston rings without cylinder lubricants, was introduced for dental medicine. This cleared the way for preparations using bonding technology. In the same year, the paradento spray was introduced. The spray provides dentists with a successful prophylaxis and treatment method against marginal periodontal diseases. 1965 saw the introduction of Orotol, the care and disinfectant product for suction units. In 1966, the first fully automated X-ray film developer was developed and produced on behalf of Siemens under the name of Procomat. The year 1969 saw the introduction of the Dürr central suction systems which paved the way for modern multiple room surgery suction solutions.

=== 1970 to 1978 ===
In 1970, the company name was changed to Dürr Dental GmbH & Co. KG. Subsequently, the laboratory business was established in 1972 due to the development and production of the Multivac vacuum embedding unit for Degussa. From 1973, compressors were produced for North America on Long Island (New York) under the name Engineering Dental Industry. The year 1974 welcomed the introduction of the dry air unit for compressors for the protection of dental instruments from oxidation and from the growth of microorganisms in the pressure tank. In 1975, the Dürr 1330 X-ray film developer reached the market. This enabled the complete automation of the X-ray film development of all dental formats. The first foreign company branch, Dürr Dental France, was opened in 1977. The year 1978 saw the transfer of the US activities to the Joint Venture Air Techniques in Hicksville, New York.

=== 1981 to 1989 ===
In 1981, the founding of Dürr GmbH & Co. KG – Luft- und Processor-Technik caused the company to diversify into new business areas. The main focus was on pumps and compressors for special industrial applications. 1982 saw the company moving to today's company headquarters in Bietigheim-Bissingen, Höpfigheimer Straße 17. The company's own electronics production with printed circuit board assembly in Gechingen was realised from 1983. The Dürr system hygiene for disinfection and cleaning in surgeries and laboratories was introduced in 1986. From 1987, amalgam separators were produced. In 1989, the first X-ray film developer with dip tank technology was brought onto the market. Crystallisation of the chemicals on the rollers is prevented, thus ensuring lasting optimal image quality.

=== 1991 to 1999 ===
The 50-year anniversary was celebrated in 1991 with a grand ceremony under the viaduct in Bietigheim Bietigheim Viaduct. The combination suction unit VSA 300 was introduced in the year of 1993; a combination of suction machine, separation unit and amalgam separator for the first time. In 1995, the VistaCam dental video system was introduced for expanding the diagnostic possibilities. The VistaRay X-ray sensors were introduced in 1997. In the year 1999, the Vector was introduced for the therapy and prophylaxis of parodontopathies.

=== 2002 to 2009 ===
2002 saw the introduction of the VistaScan image plate scanner for reading X-ray images. In the year 2004, the RinsEndo handpiece was introduced for hydrodynamic root canal preparation. The first fully digital intraoral camera VistaCam Digital was introduced in 2005. 2007 welcomed the introduction of the VistaProof fluorescence camera for support in plaque and caries diagnostics. In August 2008, the company changed its legal form to a limited company (German Aktiengesellschaft). Introduction of the VistaScan Mini image plate scanner followed in September 2009.

=== 2010 to 2020 ===
From 2010 to 2015, the company has been a premium partner of the German Dentists' Conference in the fields of hygiene management and imaging processes. In 2011, the VistaCam iX intraoral camera for intraoral and fluorescent images was presented. March 2013 saw an arsonist set fire to a warehouse of Dürr Dental in Bietigheim. It was completely destroyed, and the neighbouring production building was partly damaged. The VistaPano fully digital panorama X-ray unit and the VistaIntra intraoral X-ray emitter were introduced. 2015 saw the introduction of the Tyscor VS 2 radial aspiration system with the Tyscor Pulse software, the VistaCam iX HD interchangeable head intraoral camera as well as the VistaPano S Ceph X-ray unit were introduced. In 2016, the HygoClave 90 steam sterilizer, the new VistaVox S 3D X-ray unit, and a new prophylaxis line under the "Lunos" brand were launched. 2017 saw the completion of the new production hall at the site of the subsidiary Dürr Optronik in Gechingen for increased production of 3D X-ray equipment and blanks. On January 15, 2018, Dürr Dental SE was entered in the commercial register, thus completing the conversion from Dürr Dental AG to an SE.

=== From 2020 ===
2021, CEO Martin Dürrstein received the "Entrepreneur of the Year 2021" award. At the end of the same year, the new logistics and training center of Dürr Dental's subsidiary Orochemie in Kornwestheim was completed after nearly two years of construction.

In 2022, Dürr Dental introduced VistaSoft Monitor 3.0, a cloud-based software solution. In combination with the design award-winning VistaScan Ultra View, VistaSoft 3.0 brings artificial intelligence to dental practices.

Since 2023, Dürr Dental has been on its way to carbon neutrality by implementing targeted sustainable measures for its sites and in the development and use of its products. Disinfectant wipes from Dürr Dental receive the GREEN DENTAL AWARD 2025.

In 2025, Dürr Dental received the “Top Company Award 2025” from the independent employer platform kununu for the fourth time in a row and took first place in the exclusive ranking of “Germany's most innovative mid-size companies” by WirtschaftsWoche and Munich Strategy. In addition, Dürr Dental was awarded the title of “Best Managed Company” by Deloitte Private, UBS, the Frankfurter Allgemeine Zeitung, and the Federation of German Industries (BDI).

== DÜRR DENTAL Group ==
- DÜRR DENTAL SE, Bietigheim-Bissingen (Germany)
- DÜRR DENTAL Global GmbH, Bietigheim-Bissingen (Germany)
- Dürr NDT GmbH & Co. KG, Bietigheim-Bissingen (Germany)
- Dürr Optronik GmbH & Co. KG, Gechingen/Calw (Germany)
- Orochemie GmbH & Co. KG, Kornwestheim (Germany)
- Air Techniques Inc., Melville/New York (USA)

== Branches ==
- Dürr Dental Andina SAS, Bogotá D.C. (Colombia)
- Dürr Dental Austria GmbH, Innsbruck (Austria)
- Dürr Dental Belgium B.V.B.A., Hever/Brussels (Belgium)
- Dürr Dental do Brasil Ltda., São Paulo (Brazil)
- Dürr Dental France S.A.R.L., Rueil-Malmaison/Paris (France)
- Dürr Dental India Ltd., Delhi (India)
- Dürr Dental Italia S.r.l., Concorezzo/Milan (Italy)
- Dürr Dental Japan K.K., Hyogo-ken/Kobe-shi (Japan)
- Dürr Dental Medics Iberica S.A., Barbera del Valles/Barcelona (Spain)
- Dürr Dental UK Ltd., Kettering/Birmingham (England)
- Dürr Dental Schweiz AG, Horn (Switzerland) (Commercial agency)
- Dürr Dental Shanghai Ltd., Shanghai (China)
- Dürr Dental South East Asia SDN BHD, Petaling Jaya/Kuala Lumpur (Malaysia)
