= Kusatsu Special Prison =

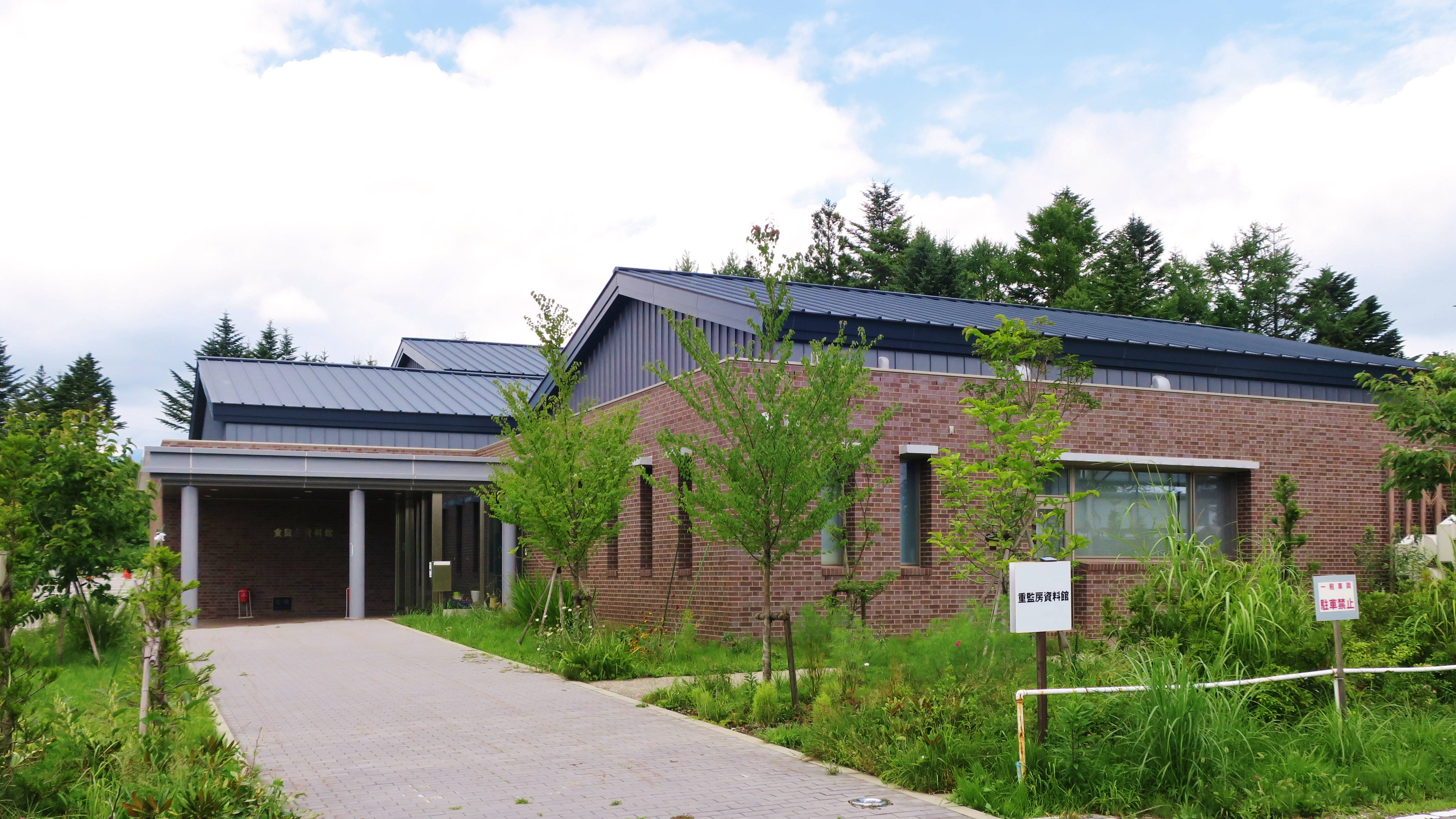
- Jyu-kanbo (special hospital ward) National Museum of Detention for Hansen's Disease Patients

Geography
- Location: Kusatsu Onsen, Kusatsu town, Gunma Prefecture, Japan

Organisation
- Type: Prison hospital, Leprosariums

History
- Opened: 1938
- Closed: 1947

Links
- Lists: Hospitals in Japan

Kusatsu Special Prison was a prison that operated between 1938 and 1947, in Kuryu Rakusen-en Sanatorium in Kusatsu Onsen, Kusatsu town, Gunma Prefecture, Japan, where criminals from public leprosaria throughout Japan were imprisoned. Prisons for conventional crimes had been built earlier in all public leprosaria. A total of 22 out of 93 prisoners died of cold or maltreatment in the cells or after confinement. In Japanese, it was called Tokubetsu Byoshitsu (特別病室, Special Ward) or Jyu Kanbo (重監房, Prison for Severe Crimes).

== Related history ==
In 1909, the first public leprosy policy started in Japan, creating public leprosaria (a specialized form of sanatorium) which accommodated wandering lepers; some of them criminals. In 1915, the treatment of criminals was discussed by leprosarium directors. In 1916, the leprosy prevention law was amended and that time, decisions of confinement and custody could be made by a director of a leprosarium, with other decisions such as reduction of meals (this was discontinued in 1947) and 30-day confinement in a leprosarium. Between 1912 and 1951, several riots took place in leprosaria.

== The prison ==
Kusatsu Special Prison was completed at the end of 1938. There were 8 independent cells; each cell was less than 4.5m in size, with wooden floors with a hole as a latrine. There was a small hole for the distribution of meals. There was no heating system. The cells had tall walls and were physically separate from each other, each cell being a separate building entity. The temperature would often reach -20 °C. Administration, maintenance and repression were roles partaken by male nurses.

== Statistics ==
- Deaths in prison –14; deaths after confinement in prison – 8; survivors – 71; Total – 93
  - Months of death: Nov-Mar – 18, July-Aug – 3, Sep-Oct – 1; Total – 22
  - Mean days of confinement: 156 days for deaths within the cells; 239 days for deaths after confinement; 114 days for survivors; Mean – 131 days

== Dispute ==
In March 1947, Colonel Paul Rush, an American physician, visited the sanatorium and heard the complaints of patients. Subsequently the patients sent a complaint letter, but received no response.

On August l, Prince Takamatsu visited the sanatorium and entered the prison. He asked the sanatorium staff several questions. On August 11, Japan Communist Party members, in preparation for a coming upper house election, visited the sanatorium and were surprised to see the prison. On August 22, discussions between patients and the sanatorium began. When the diet problem was discussed, the director was changed and the responsible section-chief was dismissed.

== Testimony ==
Jun Takada, 19 at that time, testified against the prison.

Transfer of dead bodies: The season was almost winter, and we had to obey the order of the doctors. It was about 9 or 10 in the morning. I carried about 5 or 6 bodies. The dead body was like a dried frog; he was dead and freezed. It was dark and violet in color. We covered him with futon, and carried the futon and placed the body on a stretcher. The place was dark and the door was going to close, and we shouted "Don't close".

== Kikuchi Medical Prison ==
- The necessity of a prison was disputed in the diet and Kikuchi Medical Prison was built in 1953 in Kōshi city, Kumamoto Prefecture.

== Notes and references ==
- Fuusetsu no Mon, 50 years of Kuryu Rakusen-en, Jichikai, 1082.
- A History of Leprosy in Japan. Shun-Ichi Yamamoto, Tokyo University Press, 1993.ISBN 4-13-066401-8 C3047 P8755E
- The Records of Hansen's Disease Prison, Michio Miyasaka, Shueicha, 2006.ISBN 4-08-720339-5 C0212 Y660E
