= RIN (rapper) =

German rapper

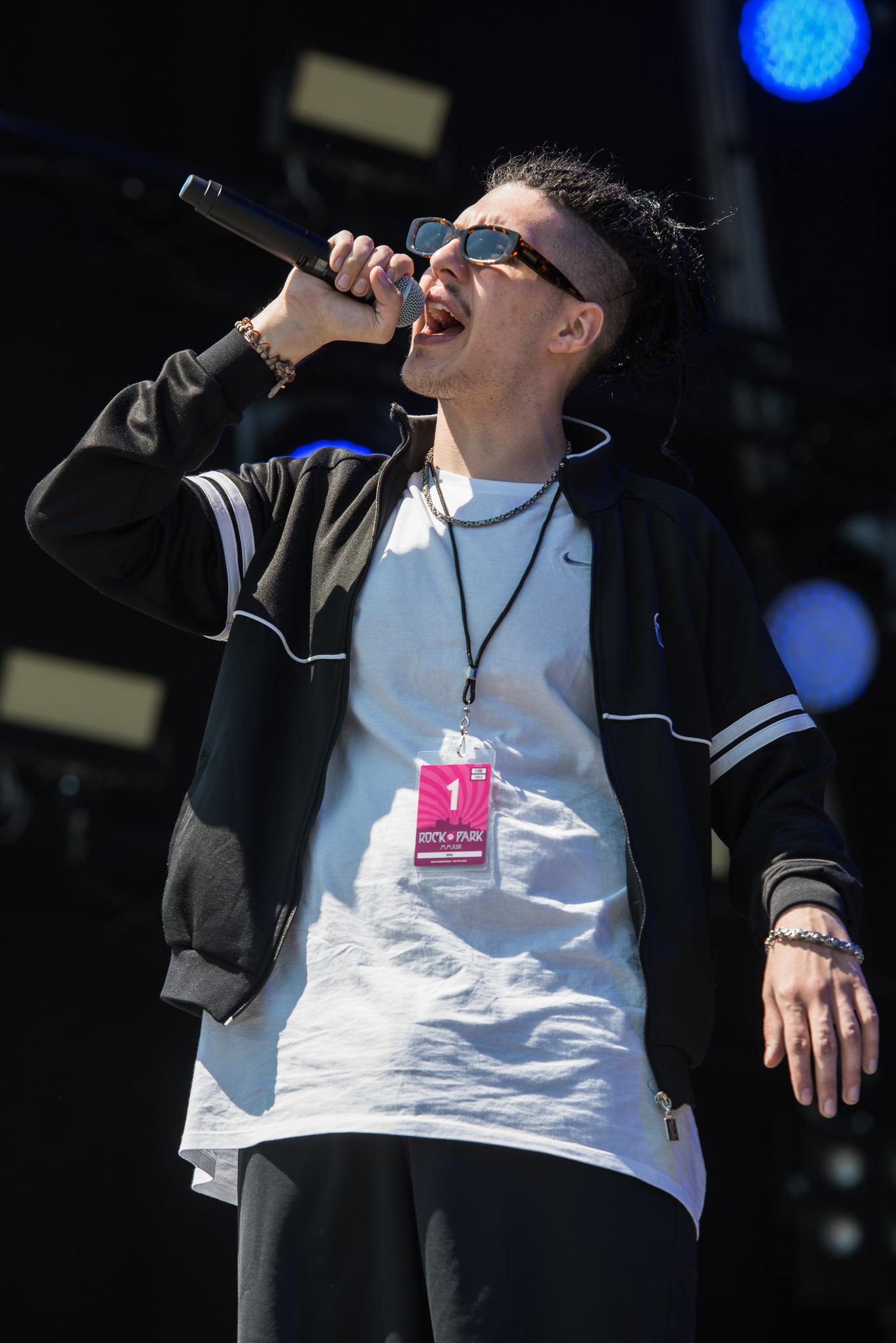
- RIN in Nürnberg (2017)

Background information
- Born: Renato Šimunović; 28 June 1994 (age 31); Bietigheim-Bissingen, Baden-Württemberg, Germany
- Genres: Hip hop; cloud rap; melodic rap
- Occupation: Rapper
- Years active: 2012–present
- Labels: Live from Earth; Division Recordings

Renato Šimunović (born 28 June 1994), also known as RIN (German pronunciation: [rɪn]), is a German-born rapper.

== Life ==
RIN's parents both are Croats from Bosnia and Herzegovina. His mother originally comes from Herzegovina and his father from Bosnia. In the 1970s, his father came to Germany as a migrant worker. For this reason, RIN only has a Croatian citizenship instead of a German one. He grew up in Bietigheim-Bissingen, which is located near Stuttgart in Baden-Württemberg, Germany. He graduated from the Realschule there. RIN's parents have a restaurant in Ludwigsburg, which is a city next to Bietigheim-Bissingen.

== Career ==
In 2012, RIN started to make music with the rapper Caz. In the summer of 2015, he first published two songs called "Ljubav/Beichtstuhl" (engl. Love/ Confessional), which caught the attention of the producer The Breed from the label Alles oder Nix (engl. Everything or nothing). Together they produced an extended play (EP), however the EP was never made public because of different visions they had regarding the EP. Shortly after that, RIN met Max, who worked for the Berliner Independent-Label 'Live from Earth'. The label supported RIN since then. Through the label, RIN also met the Austrian rapper Yung Hurn, with whom he recorded the extended play Mafia der Liebe (engl. Mafia of love), but the EP was not released. As the album's lead single, Yung Hurn released the song "Bianco" together with RIN on 12 May 2016. The song became the summer hit of 2016 and also was voted single of the year in the annual charts of Juice magazine.

In the beginning of 2017, RIN's songs were in the official German charts for the first time. Since 2017, RIN has been signed by the Label Division Recordings, which had been founded by the selfmade-record- CEO Elvir Omerbegovic and the Factory-directors Markus Weicker and Michael Weicker. On 5 August, the official list of songs of his debut album, EROS, were published. The album, with its 15 songs, was released on the first of September 2017. Three months later, RIN won the 1 Live Krone (the biggest award in the German radio business) with his album 'EROS' in the category best album.

On 22 June 2018, his mixtape 'Planet Megatron' was released. His next single 'Dior 2001' made it to the top of the German and the Swiss charts and he also received a Golden Record in Germany and a Platinum one in Austria.

In 2019, he published various songs that were ranked high in the German charts, one of them is called "Up In Smoke". Moreover, he announced his second album, Nimmerland (engl. Neverland) by releasing another song, called "Fabergé", on 27 September 2019. The album launched on 6 December of the same year with a so-called "deluxe-box" that was created in cooperation with Nike.

On 29 October 2021, his third studio album was released, Kleinstadt (engl. small town).

== Discography ==
=== Studio albums ===
EROS

- Released: 2017
- Label: Division Recordings Gold League
- Chart position: 3 (Germany)
- Sales: + 100,000
- Certification: BVMI: Gold

Nimmerland (engl. Neverland)

- Released: 2019
- Label: Division Recordings Gold League
- Chart position: 3 (Germany)

Kleinstadt (engl. small town)

- Released: 2021
- Label: Division Recordings Gold League
- Chart position: 5 (Germany)

=== Singles ===
Album	Singles
Eros	Blackout • Dizzee Rascal Type Beat • Ich will dass du mich brauchst • Doverstreet • Bros • Monica Bellucci • Data Love
Planet Megatron	Nike • Avirex • Need for Speed • One Night • Dior 2001
Nimmerland	Vintage • Up in Smoke • Fabergé • Keine Liebe • Bietigheimication
Kleinstadt	Dirty South • Meer • San Andreas • Sado • Insomnia • 1976 • Apple • FYM
Features	Bianco • Next • Ayo Technology • Oh Junge • Centre Court • Low Life • Gift

== Accolades ==
HipHop.de Awards

- 'Best national Newcomer'
  2017
- 'Best national Live-Act'
  2020
