= Pur (band) =

German pop band

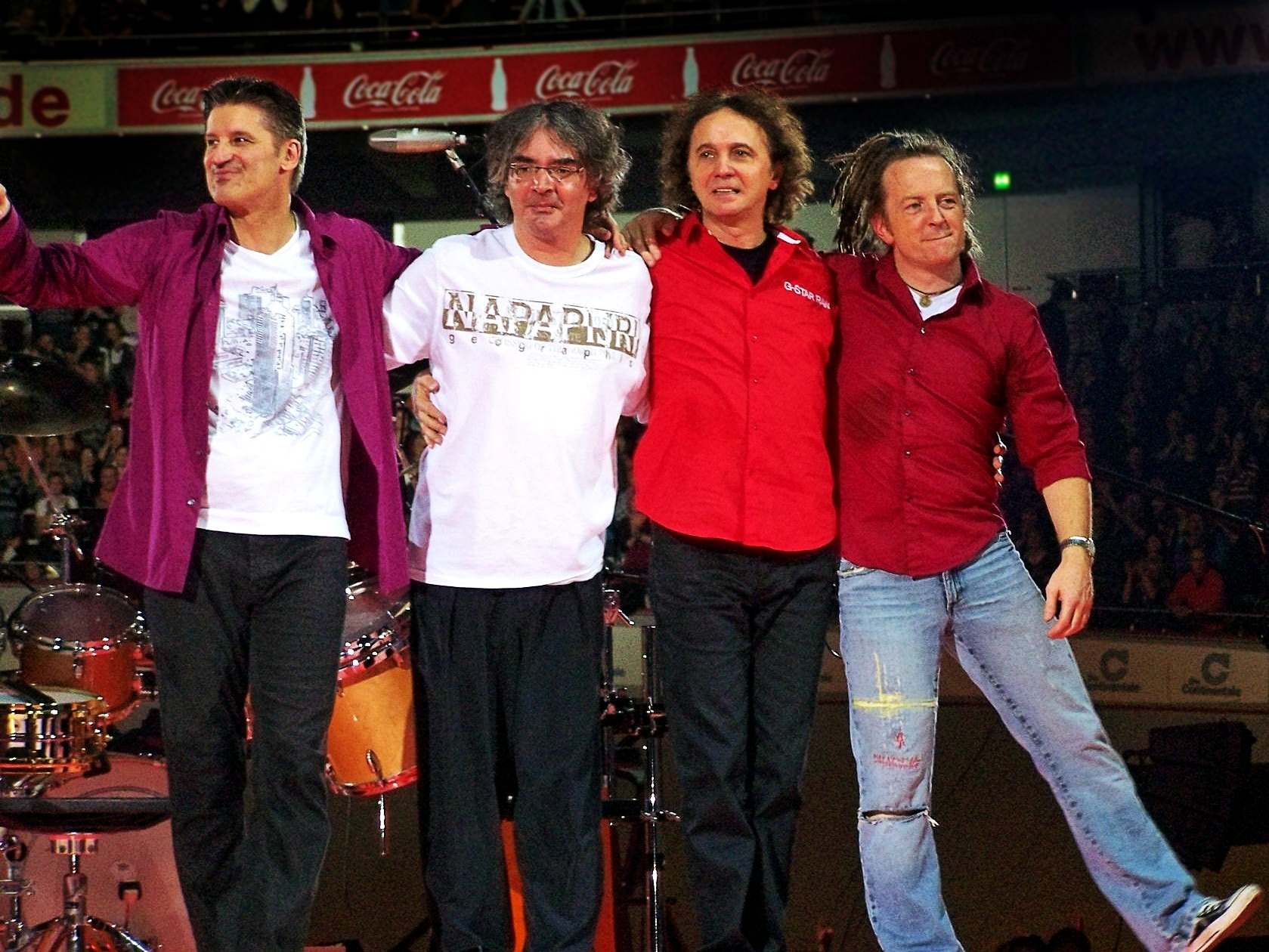
- L-R: Hartmut Engler, Ingo Reidl, Rudi Buttas, Joe Crawford (2009)

Background information
- Origin: Bietigheim-Bissingen, Germany
- Genres: Pop, pop rock
- Years active: 1975–present
- Members: Hartmut Engler (vocals); Ingo Reidl (keyboards); Joe Crawford (bass); Rudi Buttas (guitar); Frank Dapper (percussion); Cherry Gehring (keyboards)
- Past members: Roland Bless (percussion); Martin Stoeck (percussion); Martin Ansel (guitar, keyboards)

Pur is a German pop band from Bietigheim-Bissingen.

== History ==
The group was initially founded in 1975 under the name Crusade by Roland Bless and Ingo Reidl. Their first releases came out under the name Opus, but after an Austrian band with the same name had a huge hit single in Germany in 1985, they switched to the name Pur. Pur's first hit single in Germany was "Lena", released in 1990. In the 1990s and 2000s they had a string of number 1 albums in Germany. The producer of Pur was Dieter Falk from 1990 to 1998.

Their song "Abenteuerland" is featured in commercials for ThyssenKrupp.

== Discography ==
Year	Title	Chart Positions	Sales	IFPI Certifications
Year	Title	GER	Sales	IFPI Certifications
1983	Opus			
1985	Vorsicht zerbrechlich			
1987	PUR			
1988	Wie im Film			
1990	Unendlich mehr	45	250.000+	DE: Gold
1991	Nichts ohne Grund	13	250.000+	DE: Gold
1992	PUR Live	7	1.000.000+	DE: 2× Platinum
1993	Seiltänzertraum	2	1.500.000+	DE: 3× Platinum
1995	Abenteuerland	1	2.075.000+	DE: 3× Platinum
1996	Pur Live – Die Zweite	1	500.000+	DE: Platinum
1998	Mächtig viel Theater	1	1.100.000+	DE: 3× Platinum
2000	Mittendrin	1	625.000+	DE: 2× Platinum
2001	Hits PUR – 20 Jahre eine Band	1	470.000+	DE: 3× Gold
2003	Was ist passiert?	1	400.000+	DE: 2× Platinum
2005	PUR Klassisch	2	200.000+	DE: Platinum
2006	Es ist wie es ist	1	300.000+	DE: 3× Gold
2009	Wünsche	1	200.000+	DE: Platinum
2010	PUR Live – Die Dritte – Akustisch	6	n/a	DE: n/a
2012	Schein & Sein	2	200.000+	DE: Platinum
2013	Schein & Sein – Live aus Berlin		n/a	DE: n/a
2015	Achtung	1	200.000+	DE: Platinum
2018	Zwischen den Welten	2	100.000+	DE: Gold
2022	Persönlich	3	100.000+	DE: n/a
