= Bietigheim Horse Market =

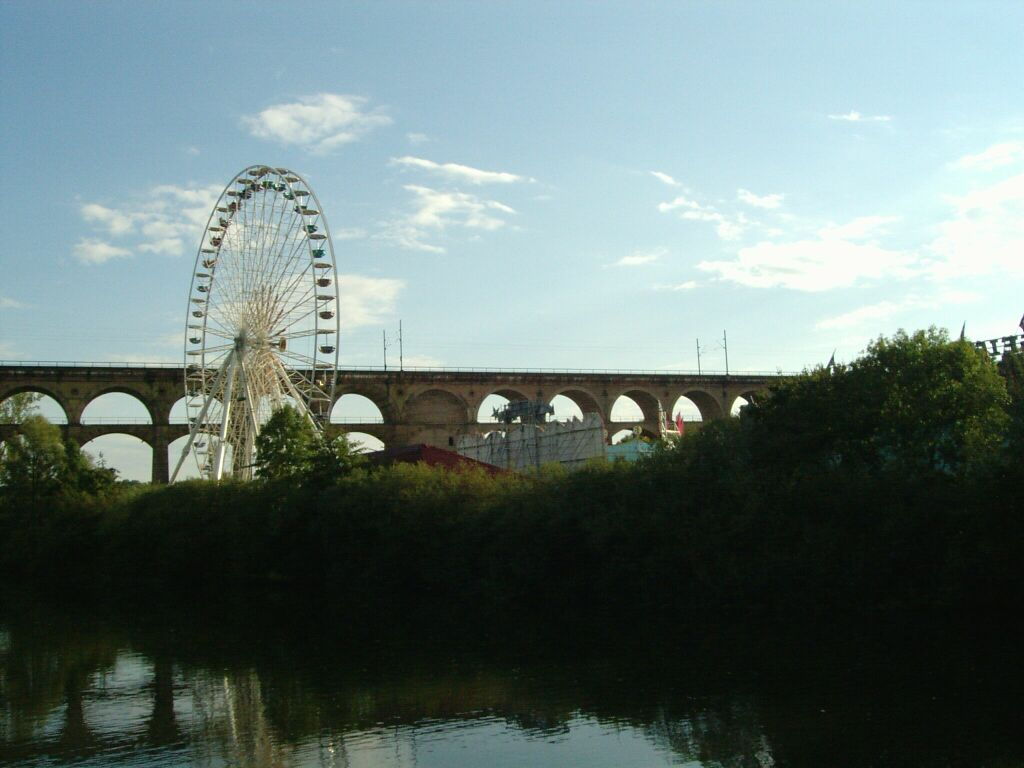
Bietigheim Horse Market

The Bietigheim Horse Market is a well-known supra-regional Volksfest (beer festival and travelling funfair) in Bietigheim-Bissingen which takes place directly under the Bietigheim Enz Valley Bridge. It attracts several hundred thousand visitors every year. Despite this large crowd of visitors, however, the festival has retained the charm of a local festival.

The Bietigheim Horse Market begins on the Friday before the first Monday in September and ends the following Tuesday. Besides the traditional horse market on Monday, a riding and horse-jumping tournament is held from Friday until Sunday, and other riding demonstrations along with a procession and a subsequent concours d'elegance on Monday. There is also an entertainment park with marquees, a large market, and fireworks after nightfall on Sunday. COVID-19 (2020–21), persistent drought (2022), and logistics (2023) meant that the fireworks display of 2024 was the first since 2019.

The Ferris wheel on the festival ground offers an opportunity to take aerial photographs of trains on the Bietigheim Enz Valley Bridge.
