= Bietigheim-Bissingen =

- Town
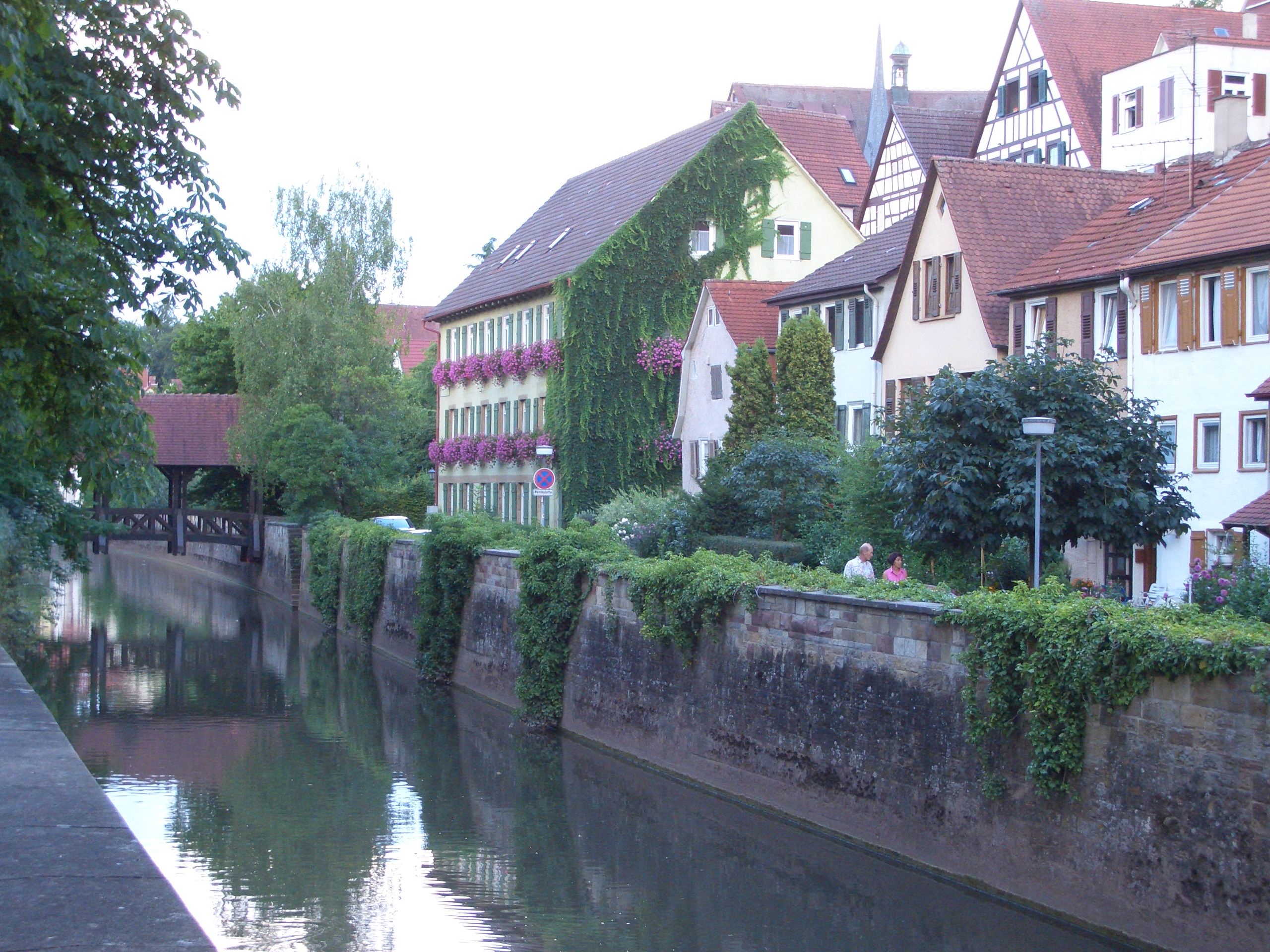
- Bietigheim Altstadt

- Flag Coat of arms

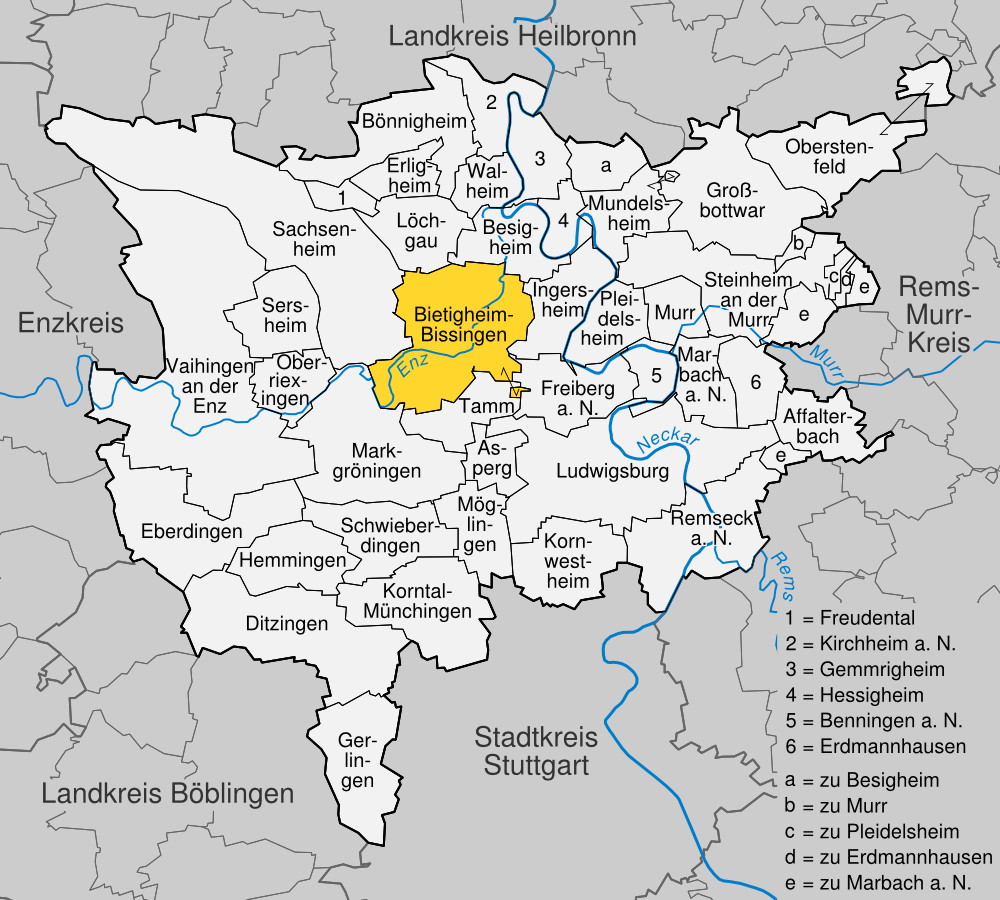
- Location of Bietigheim-Bissingen within Ludwigsburg district
- Interactive map of Bietigheim-Bissingen
- Location within Germany Location within Baden-Württemberg
- Coordinates: 48°56′58″N 9°08′10″E
- Country: Germany
- State: Baden-Württemberg
- Admin. region: Stuttgart
- District: Ludwigsburg
- Subdivisions: 5

Government
  - Mayor (2020–28): Jürgen Kessing (SPD)

Area
  - Total: 31.29 km^{2} (12.08 sq mi)
- Elevation: 200 m (660 ft)

Population (2025-12-31)
  - Total: 43,354
  - Density: 1,386/km^{2} (3,589/sq mi)
- Time zone: UTC+01:00 (CET)
  - Summer (DST): UTC+02:00 (CEST)
- Postal codes: 74301–74321
- Dialling codes: 07142
- Vehicle registration: LB
- Website: bietigheim-bissingen.de

Bietigheim-Bissingen (German pronunciation: [ˈbiːtɪçhaɪm ˈbɪsɪŋən] or [ˈbiːtɪk-]; locally: Biedge-Bissenge) is the second-largest town in the district of Ludwigsburg, Baden-Württemberg, Germany with 42,515 inhabitants in 2007. It is situated on the river Enz and the river Metter, close to its confluence with the Neckar, about 19 km north of Stuttgart, and 20 km south of Heilbronn.

== History ==
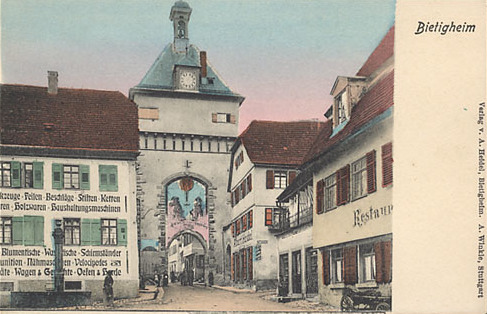
Postcard of the Bietigheim "Old Gate", c. 1900

The name is first recorded in 789 in Medieval Latin as Budic-heim, although settlements that benefitted from the favorable location by a natural ford indicate there were people likely much earlier. The Collegium Matisonensium, a community of Roman estate owners on the banks of the Metter River, was documented until the 3rd century AD. Burial grounds from the 5th to 7th centuries also point to settlements of the Alamanni in what is now the town's district. Towards the end of the 18th century Bietigheim saw during the beginning of the industrialisation an improvement of the living conditions and an increase in population. The 1806 furnished Oberamt Bietigheim was in 1810, however, dissolved again: the city and its official municipalities were integrated in the Oberamt Besigheim. After Bietigheim was connected mid-19th century to the railway network and the city experienced a real breakthrough and a sustained recovery. At the end of the 19th century there were 3,800 inhabitants. In 1938, Bietigheim came to the new Ludwigsburg (district). A branch of the Nazi Party was in Bietigheim since 1928. Until 1933, this was with 51 members relatively small. After the Nazi seizure of power there were 181 new entrants. By the end of the Nazi regime finally were 939 party members in Bietigheim, representing 10.4 percent of the total population in 1945.

== Buildings and sights ==
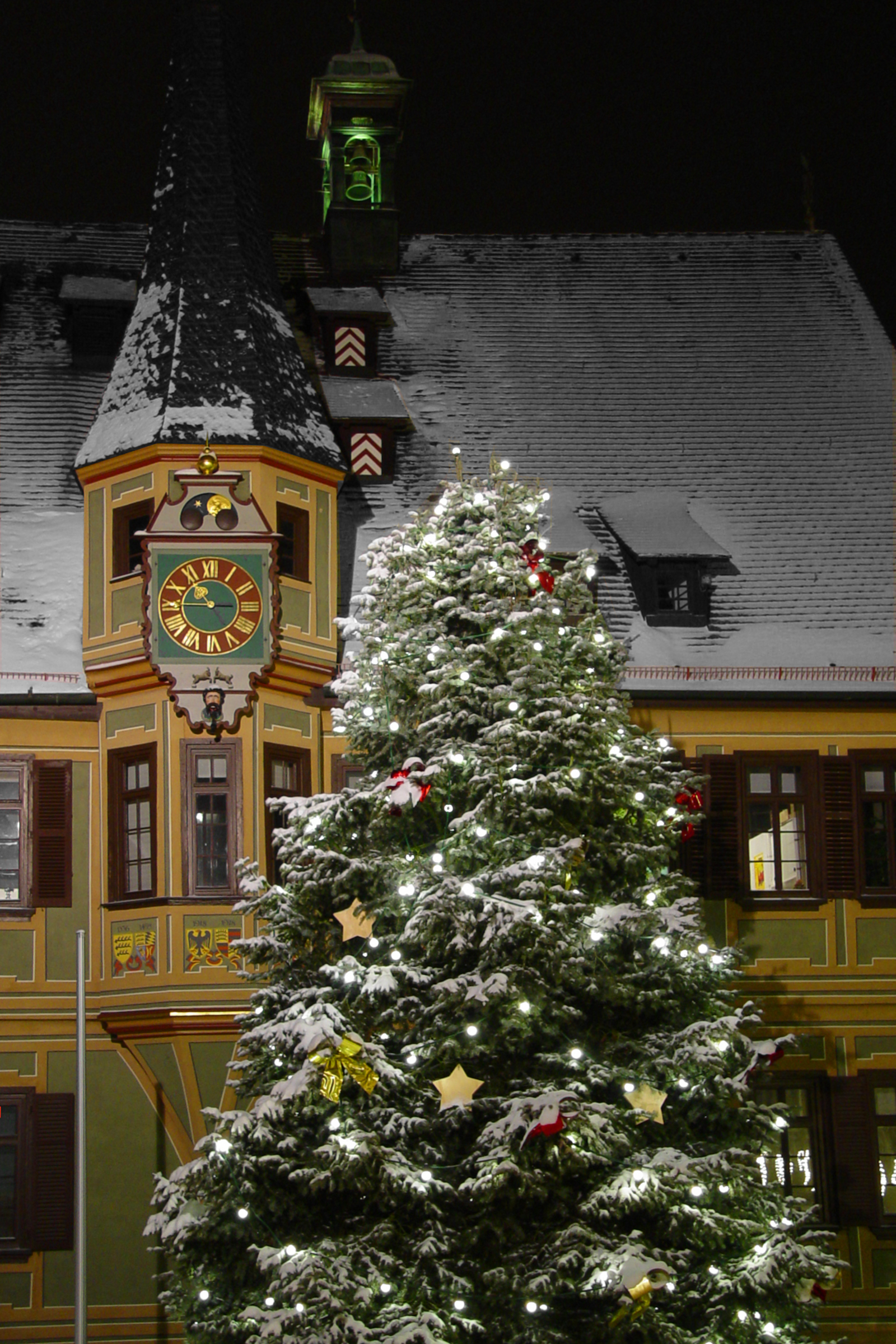
Bietigheim Town Hall

- 287 m long Bietigheim Enz Valley Bridge (German: "Bietigheimer Enzviadukt") (built in 1853)
- Old gate (only one still present, built in the 14th century)
- (Protestant) church in central Bietigheim (built in 1401)
- Kilian church in Bissingen (built from 1517)
- Wine Press (now a building for public events)
- Town hall (built in 1506)
- "Hornmoldhaus" (built in 1536)
- Castle of Bietigheim (built in 1546, renovated between 2000 and 2002), nowadays home to the Bietigheim-Bissingen music school

== Infrastructure ==
Bietigheim-Bissingen station is located on an important railway junction on the Western Railway (connecting Stuttgart with Karlsruhe and Heidelberg) and the Franconia Railway to Heilbronn. Line 5 of the Stuttgart S-Bahn and line 5 of the Stadtbahn Karlsruhe both start here.

== Notable people ==
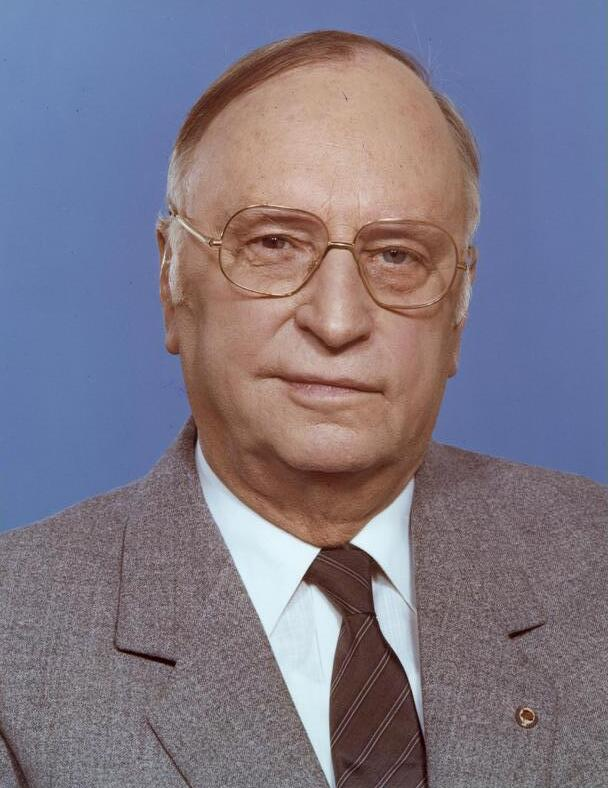
Kurt Hager, 1984

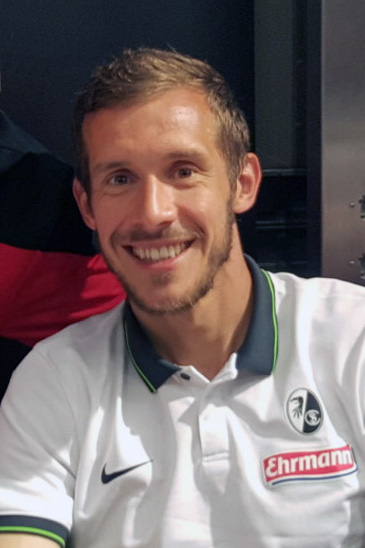
Julian Schuster, 2016

- Erwin Bälz (1849–1913), physician to the Imperial House of Japan, co-founded modern medicine in Japan
- Ottmar Mergenthaler (1854–1899), inventor of the Linotype typesetting machine, spent four years in Bietigheim during his apprenticeship to a watchmaker
- Kurt Hager (1912–1998), member of the Politbüro of the SED in GDR
- Gebhard Fürst (born 1948), bishop of Rottenburg-Stuttgart and a member of the National Ethics Council
- Stefan Hofmann (born 1964), an author, psychologist, and professor at Boston University
- Heiko Maile (born 1966), member of the German pop group Camouflage, grew up locally
- Matthias Ettrich (born 1972), founder of KDE, a software community
- Pur (founded 1975), German pop group founded locally
- Namosh (born 1981), a German musician and singer
- Michael Schindler (born 1988), a German Rap artist known as Shindy
- Renato Šimunović (born 1994), a German Rap musician known as RIN

=== Sport ===
- Julian Schuster (born 1985), football manager and former player who played 283 games
- Benedikt Röcker (born 1989), former footballer who played 309 games
- Bernd Leno (born 1992), football goalkeeper, played over 480 games and nine for Germany
- Alexander Wehrle (born 1975), sports administrator

== Events ==
- Bietigheim Horse Market
- Music Exchange with Shawnee Mission South High School symphonic band every 4 years
- Music Exchange with Shawnee Mission South High School string orchestra every 4 years
- Music Exchange with Community High School District 99 Honors Band and Orchestra (Downers Grove, IL) every 2 years.

== Business and industry ==
- Dürr Dental
- Elbe & Sohn

== Sport ==
The handball club SG BBM Bietigheim has won the women's Bundesliga several times, but has now moved official location to Ludwigsburg and plays under the name HB Ludwigsburg.

== Twin towns – sister cities ==
Bietigheim-Bissingen is twinned with:

- Kusatsu, Japan (1962)
- Sucy-en-Brie, France (1967)
- Surrey Heath, England, United Kingdom (1971)
- Szekszárd, Hungary (1989)
- Overland Park, United States (1999)
