= Mary Cornwall Legh =

British missionary

Mary H. Cornwall Legh
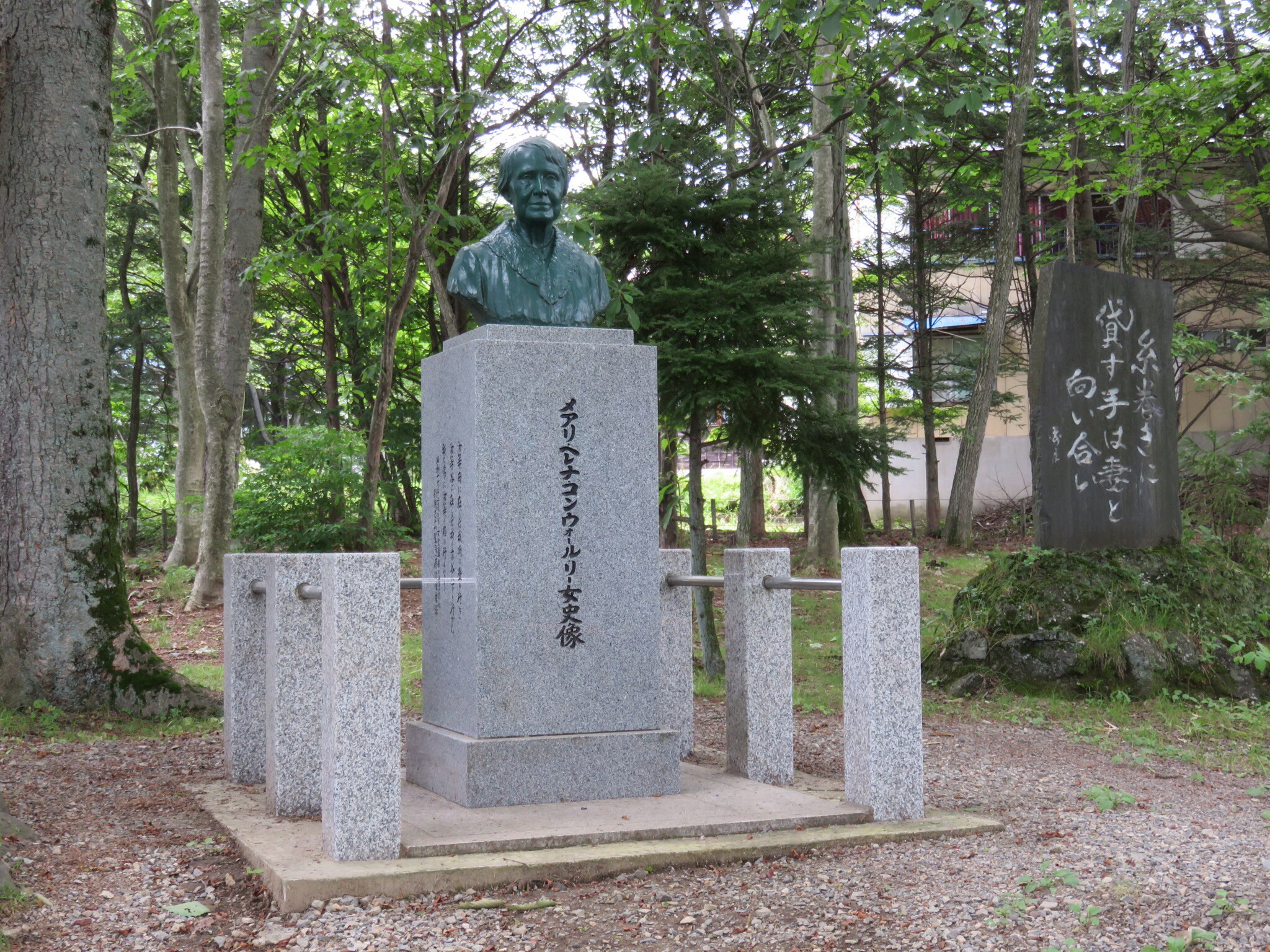
- Mary Cornwall Legh Monument, Kusatsu, Gunma
- Born: 20 May 1857; Canterbury, England
- Died: 18 December 1941 (aged 84); Akashi, Hyōgo
- Occupation: Anglican missionary
- Known for: Care of leprosy patients in Kusatsu, Gunma Prefecture, Japan. Establishment of Anglican church, hospital, kindergarten and other institutions largely with own funds.

Mary Helena Cornwall Legh (20 May 1857 – 18 December 1941), also known as "Nellie" Cornwall Legh, was a British Anglican missionary, who late in life devoted herself to the welfare, education and medical care of leprosy patients in Kusatsu, Gunma Prefecture, Japan.

== Background and early life ==
Cornwall Legh was born in 1857 at Canterbury, England, into a prominent Cheshire family. Her father, Brigadier Edmund Cornwall Legh O.B., was a decorated veteran of British military campaigns in Crimea and India. He died of reported heat stroke in India at the age of 37 when Mary was only two years old.

Cornwall Legh's early years were spent with her widowed mother and younger brother Neville at her uncle George Cornwall Legh M.P.'s estate at High Legh in Cheshire. She regularly visited London and in later life credited the influence of Rev. George Wilkinson, then vicar at St. Peter's Church, Eaton Square, with her lifelong interest in overseas Christian mission work. She traveled widely in Europe with her mother Julia, became a published children's author, studied music and drawing in France, education, economics, languages and English literature graduating in 1886 with an LLA degree from St. Andrew's University in Scotland. After traveling around the world with her mother Julia in 1892 and 1893, briefly visiting Japan en route, Cornwall Legh and her mother settled in the village of Hamble-le-Rice near Southampton.

== Early mission work in the Diocese of South Tokyo ==
Following the death of her mother in 1907, Cornwall Legh made the decision to become a self-financed SPG missionary. Having almost no surviving family relatives in England, she travelled to Japan in 1907 at the age of 50. The first eight years of Cornwall Legh's missionary work in Japan was spent in the service of the Nippon Sei Ko Kai Diocese of South Tokyo, notably at St. Andrew's Cathedral (Yokohama) and St. Barnabas' Church, Ushigome. Despite inheriting a large fortune, she was noted for the simplicity of her dress, empathy and communication with Japanese of varied social status and appreciation of modest local food.

== St. Barnabas' Mission at Kusatsu (1915–1941) ==
In 1915, Cornwall Legh visited Kusatsu at the request of a Christian belonging to the Koenkai (Light and salt society), which had been established under the influence of Hannah Riddell noted for her work at the Kaishun Hospital for leprosy patients in Kumamoto. Cornwall Legh investigated the Kusatsu Hot Spring, one of the gathering spots of leprosy patients. It was a problematic town where hundreds of leprosy patients gathered, mainly in the Yunosawa district, to find a cure or temporary relief from the symptoms of the disease. The leprosy sufferers were seen as an unwelcome presence by many in the town and often led impoverished lives without access to regular employment or medical care. Dr. Francois-Xavier Bertrand head of the Koyama Fukusei Hospital in Gotemba had first attempted to set up a hospital facility in the town in 1900, but met with immediate opposition.

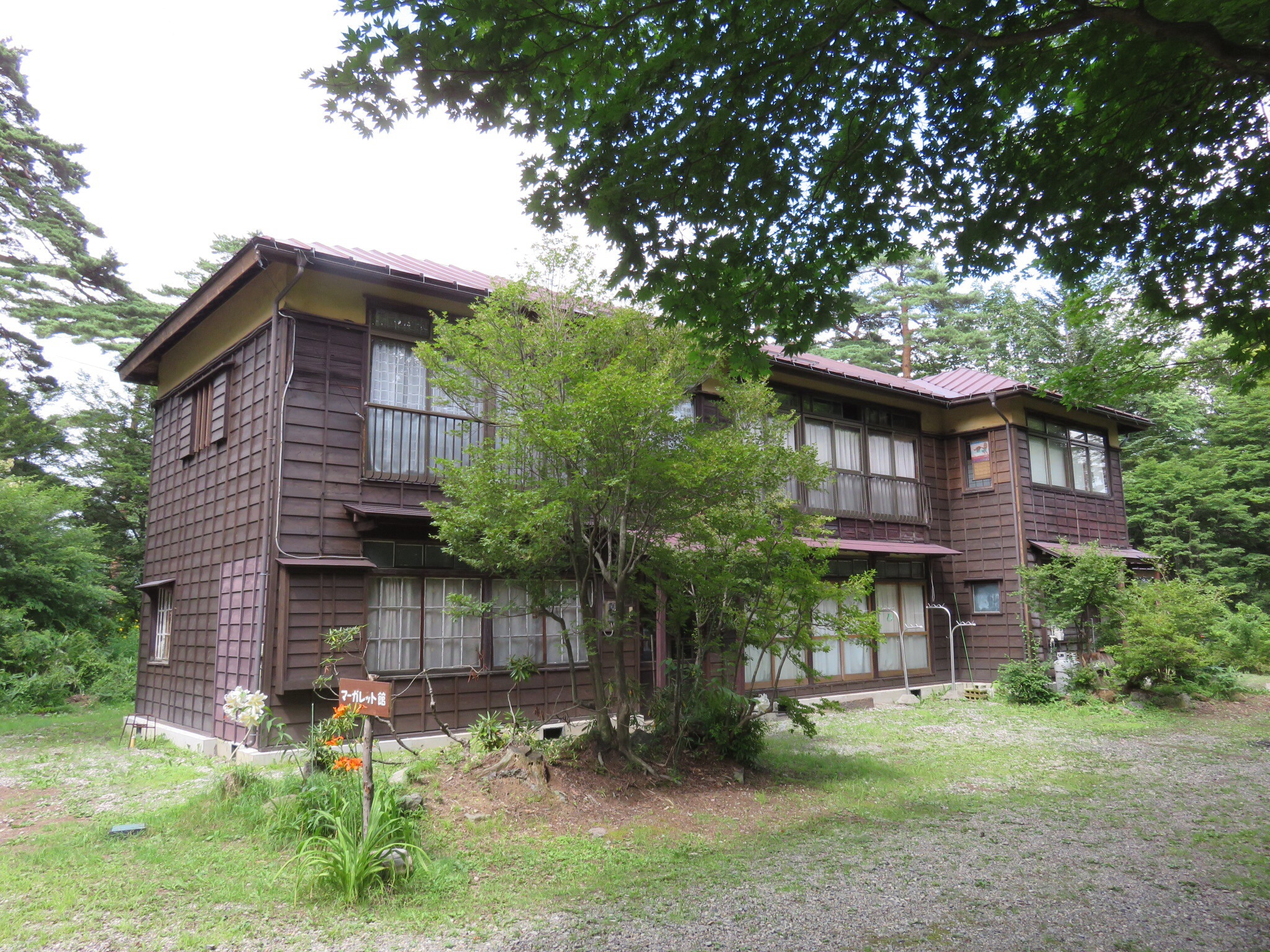
St. Margaret's Home for Girls, Kusatsu (established 1924)

Cornwall Legh started missionary work at Kusatsu in 1916. In the same year she established a kindergarten and a women's dormitory "Family of Love", in a building previously used as a ryokan. In 1917, she established a clinic (Dr. Kesa Hattori, Nurse Chiyo Mikami), followed by various homes and schools. The administration of the mission and all buildings were financially paid by her, although in later years, fundraising was also conducted in Japan, Britain and the United States.

In 1929, Tomekichi Matsumoto, a company president donated enough money for the building of a new clinic and the salary of a doctor for 10 years.

== St. Barnabas' Hospital ==
Chiyo Mikami, previously a nurse of Zensho Hospital and appointed as the nurse of the "Family of Love" dormitory of the St. Barnabas' Mission, advised to open a clinic. Dr. Kesako Hattori came and St. Barbanas' Hospital was opened.

The directors of the hospital were:

- Dr. Kesako Hattori 1917–1923
- Dr. Sadao Sato 1924–1927
- Dr. Tokitaro Nakamura 1928–1929
- Dr. Ichiro Tsuruta 1929–1941

== Closure of the St. Barnabas' Mission ==
In the 1930s the Japanese government began to establish residential care facilities for leprosy sufferers, opening the Kuryu Rakusen-en Sanatorium in Kusatsu in 1932. While welcoming the role of government in the provision of health services, Cornwall Legh also expressed concern as many leprosy patients previously hospitalized in the St. Barnabas' Hospital were against the closure of the facilities.

Cornwall Legh celebrated her 77th birthday in 1939 returning briefly to England on the account of health problems. Her leadership role at the St. Barnabas' Mission was taken over by Mary B. Magill. After returning to Japan, Cornwall Legh lived at the warmer location of Akashi, Hyogo Prefecture. The St. Barnabas' Hospital was officially closed on 13 April 1941. Cornwall Legh died on 18 December 1941 at Akashi.

== Honours and legacy ==
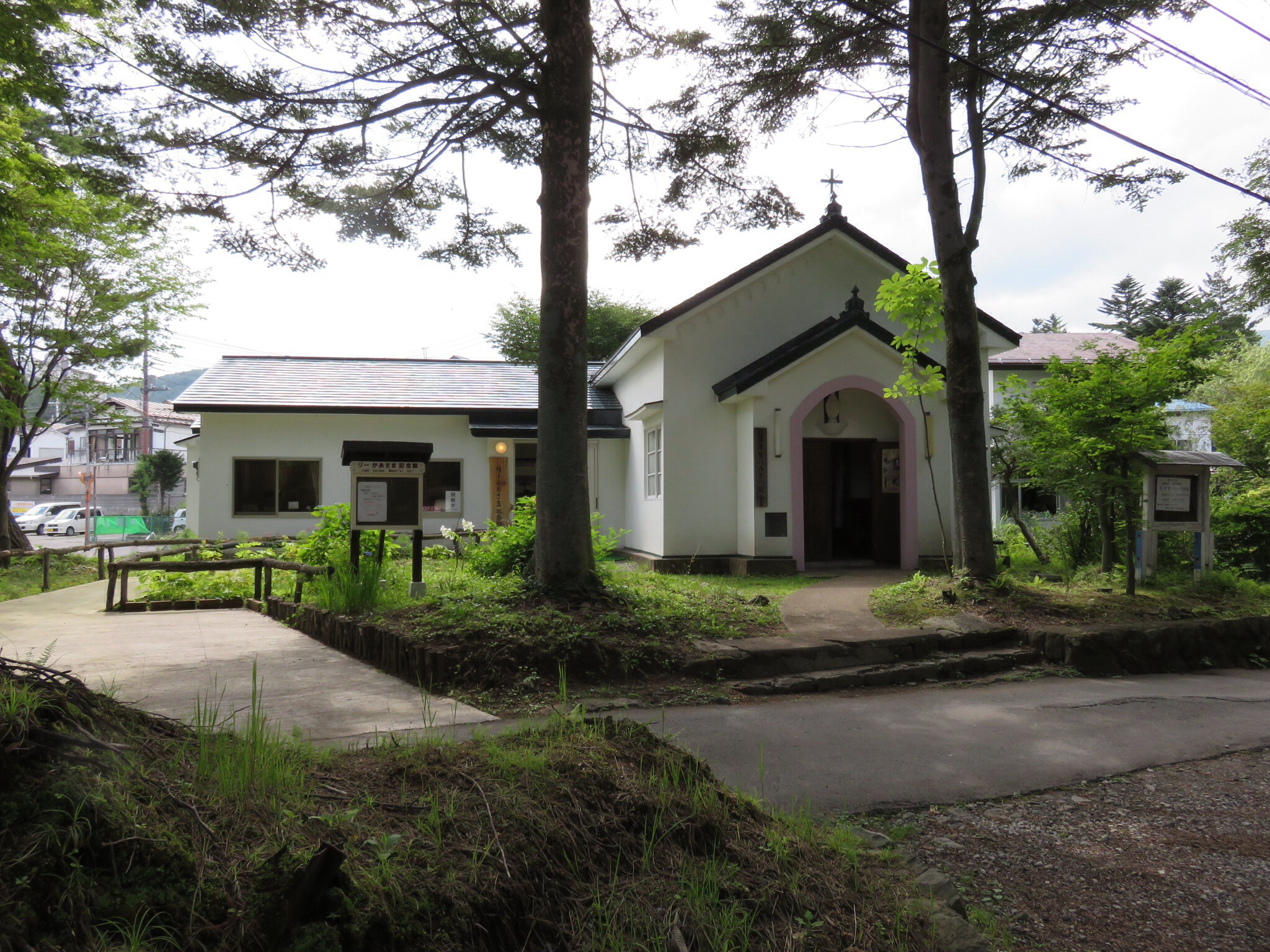
St. Barnabas' Church, Kusatsu

St. Barnabas' Church, the adjoining memorial museum and Cornwall Legh Park in Kusatsu attest to the charitable legacy of Mary Cornwall Legh and the history of the community she sought to serve.

In 2007, on the 150th anniversary of her birth, a bust of Cornwall Legh was unveiled in Kusatsu in the presence of the British ambassador to Japan, Sir Graham Holbrooke-Fry.

- In 1928, Cornwall Legh was awarded the Blue Ribbon Medal.
- In 1939, Cornwall Legh was awarded the 6th Order of the Sacred Treasure.
- In 1943, the hillside site of the former mission buildings donated by Cornwall Legh to the town of Kusatsu was named "Cornwall Legh Park".

== Admiration ==
Eiko Arai wrote that the combination of the missionary work and welfare in Kusatsu was magnificent. Legh respected the human rights of people with leprosy, and all she did was in the interests of these people.

== Bibliography ==
- Photo album: A Story of Cornwall Legh, Cornwall Legh Memorial Society, 2007 (in Japanese).
- Hansen's disease and Christianity, Eiko Arai, Iwanami Shoten, 1996 (in Japanese).
- The 60 years of the Yunosawa Colony, Kiyoshi Shimozaki and Ken Inoue, Repura 12,6 (in Kindai Shomin Seikatsushi 20, San-ichi Shobou, 1995; in Japanese).
