= Kikuchi Medical Prison =

Geography
- Location: Kōshi City, Kumamoto Prefecture, Japan
- Coordinates: 32.885441°N 130.770824°E (Kōshi)

Organisation
- Type: Specialist

Services
- Beds: 75
- Speciality: Leprosy

History
- Opened: March 1953
- Closed: 1996

Links
- Lists: Hospitals in Japan

Kikuchi Medical Prison was a prison in Kōshi City, Kumamoto Prefecture, Japan, where criminals with leprosy were imprisoned between 1953 and 1996. The formal name is Kikuchi Medical Branch Prison of Kumamoto Prison under the Ministry of Justice.

== Related history ==
In 1909, the first public leprosariums (sanatoriums) started in Japan, with wandering leprosy patients which included criminals. In 1915, the treatment of criminals was discussed by directors of leprosariums. In 1916, the decisions of confinement and custody could be made by the directors of leprosariums, such as imprisonment of less than 30 days within leprosariums and reduction of meals (this was discontinued in 1947). Between 1912 and 1951, there were various riots within the leprosariums. In 1939, a special prison was started within the Kusatsu Leprosarium which led to the Kusatsu Special Prison incident. In August 1947, members of the Japan Communist Party visited the special ward and found that 22 criminals died in the special ward or after imprisonment. However, responsible persons could not be punished. Discussions by dietmen, officials of the Ministry of Welfare and directors of leprosariums and representatives of leprosy patients agreed on the necessity of a prison. Matsuki Miyazaki, the director of Kikuchi Keifuen Sanatorium wrote that it was decided to build a prison at Kikuchi by majority decision of directors. The Kikuchi Medical Prison (capacity was 75 persons) was started in March 1953, and the first director was Kikuo Yamashita. In 1956, Toru Yoshinaga assumed the second director.

In 1982, a new building was erected adjoining the old one. In 1996, the function of the prison was abolished with the abolition of the leprosy prevention law.

== Number of prisoners ==
Year	Imprisoned patients	Year	Imprisoned patient
1953	20	1961	14
1954	25	1962	11
1955	29	1963	9
1956	15	1964	9
1957	17	1965	7
1958	25	1966	6
1959	13	1967	6
1960	16	1968	5

== Problems of the prison ==
- Prison chaplain Katsuaki Sakamoto, 80 in 2010, wrote that in 1936, there were more than 50 prisoners when he spoke on the Bible before them.
- Yasushi Shimura, a patient who sang before the prisoners, wrote that the number of the prisoners he counted was 47. Sakamoto asked the director of the prison for explanation. Yoshinaga replied that about 30 persons came from various leprosariums without formal procedures. They were bad or delinquent patients.
- In 1936, the situation was bad for leprosy patients. Sakamoto was told by his senior prison chaplain that laws in the strict sense of the word were not available in leprosariums. Namely, the leprosarium was the place of extraterritoriality.
