= Bietigheim Viaduct =

Railway bridge in Germany

Coordinates: 48°57′17″N 9°07′50″E

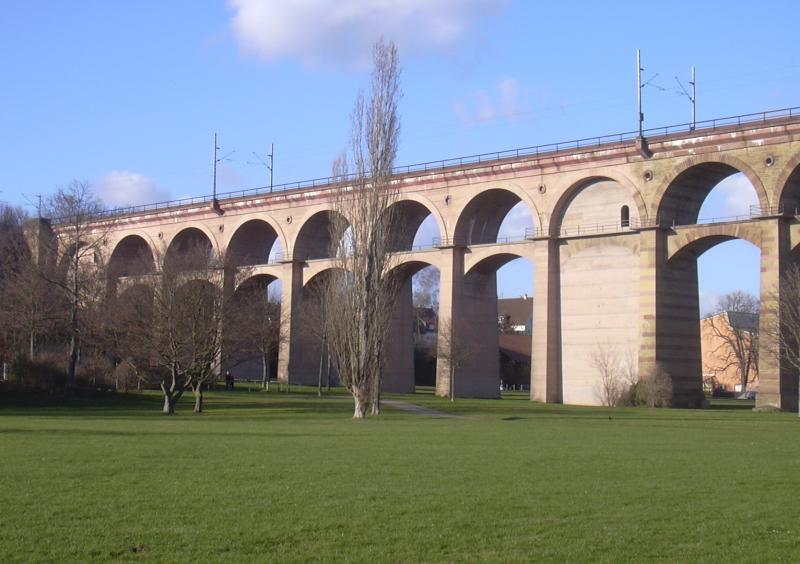
Bietigheim Viaduct, showing the concrete-filled arch

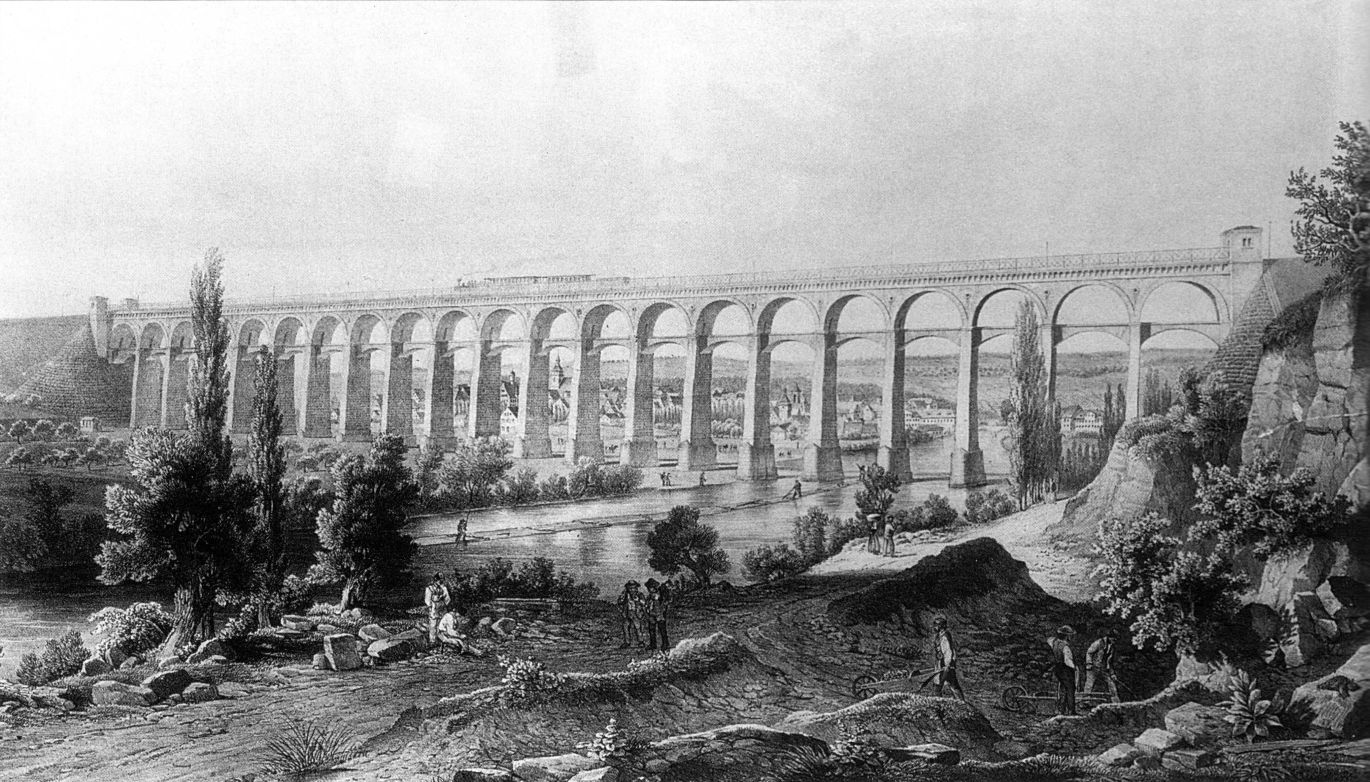
Bietigheim Viaduct in 1855

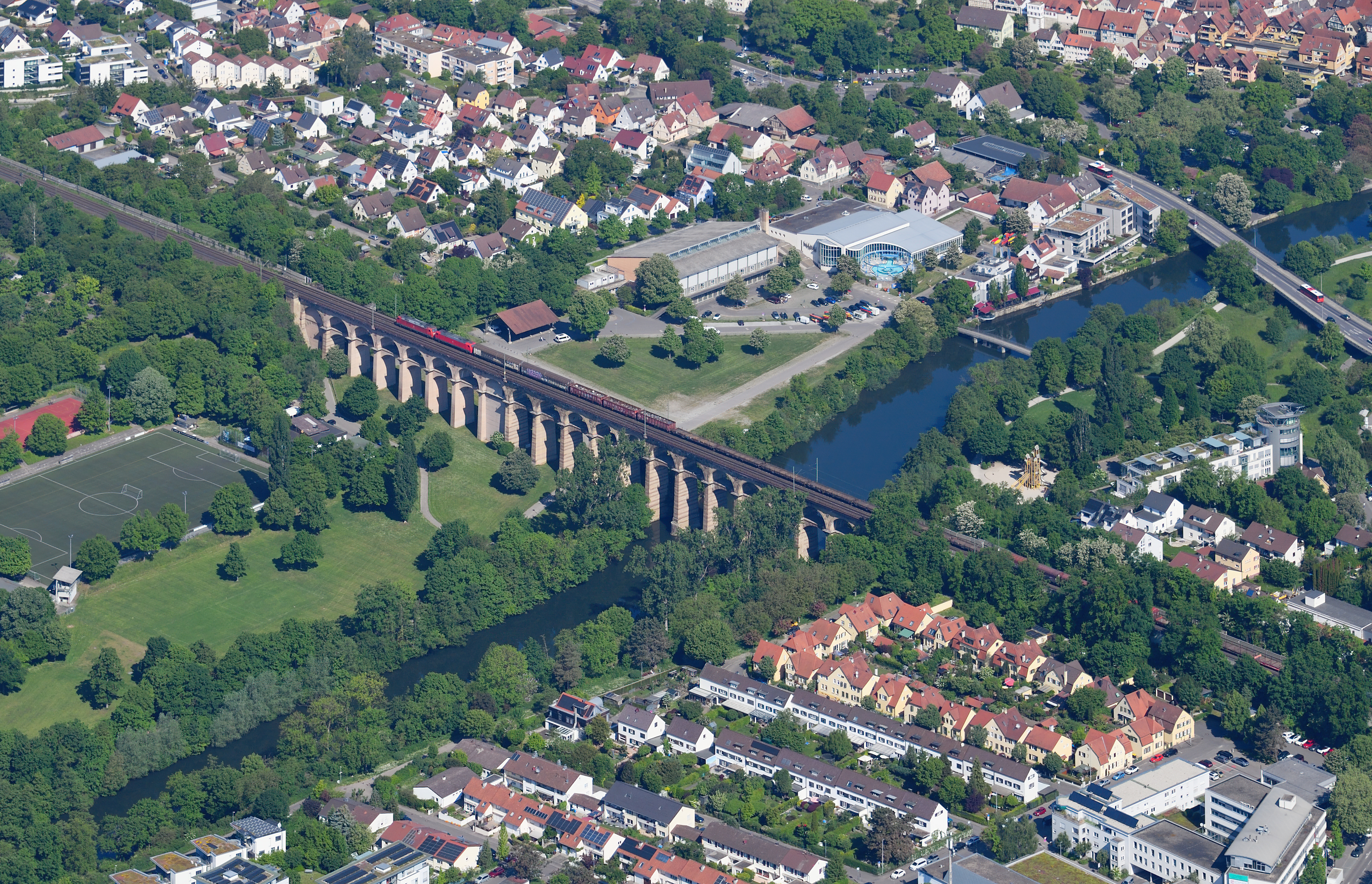
Aerial view

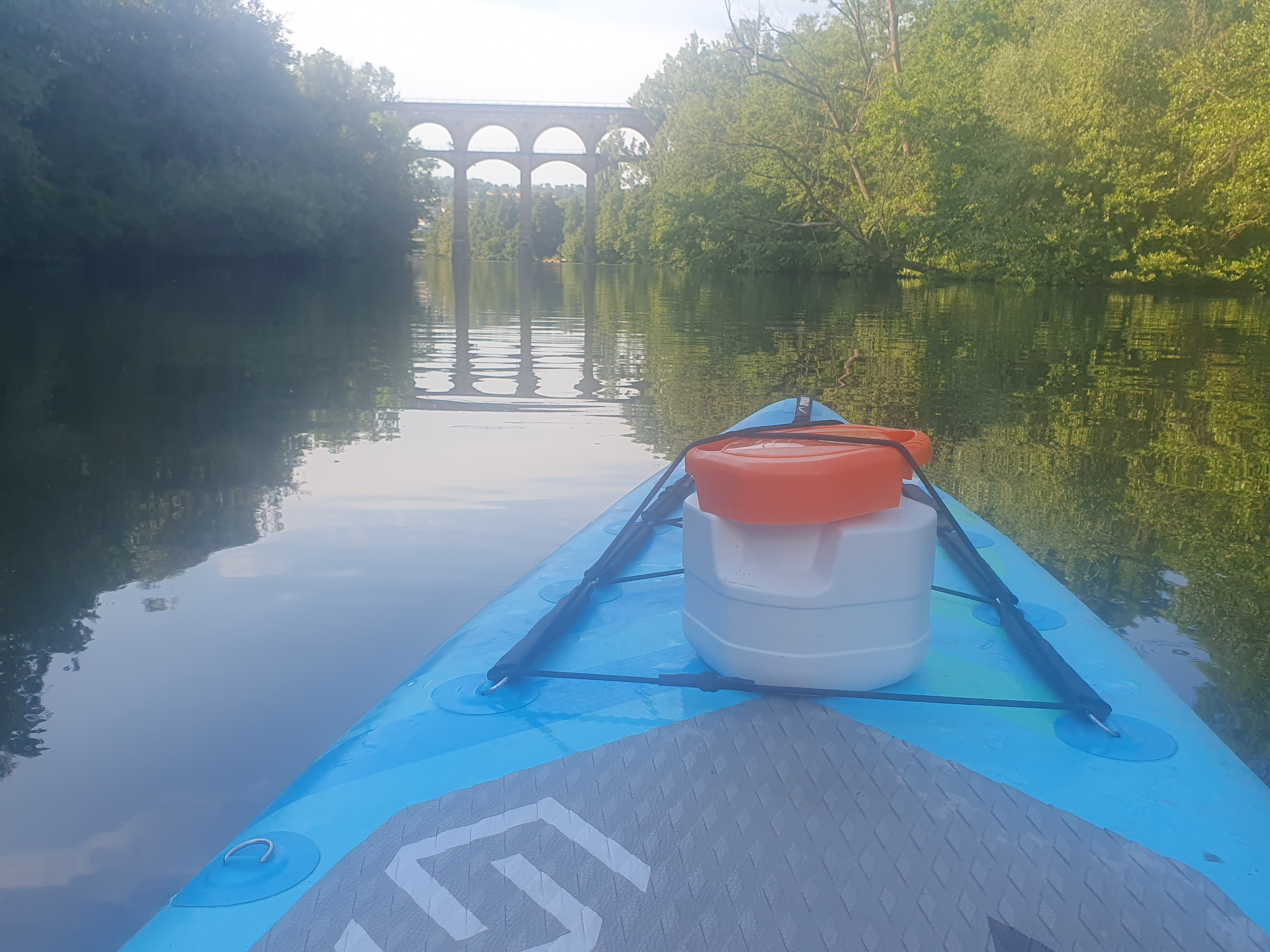
Viaduct seen from the Enz river

The Bietigheim Viaduct is a railway bridge which carries the Württemberg Western Railway over the Enz valley at Bietigheim-Bissingen, and one of the landmarks of the town. The double-track railway viaduct is 286 m (938 ft) long and 32.1 m (105 ft) high and is constructed of stone with two layers of 21 arches.

Construction began in 1851 under the direction of Karl Etzel and the first test train crossed the finished viaduct on 20 September 1853. The viaduct was strengthened in 1928–29 in order to carry heavier goods trains. Six arches were destroyed on 8 April 1945 by retreating German troops at the end of the Second World War. Before the damaged bridge was repaired a temporary steel bridge was built alongside it and used from 1946 to 1949, some foundations of which are still visible. The damaged columns were later restored and the viaduct reopened on 28 August 1949. For cost reasons the repairs were made with concrete, not stone, and one of the arches was completely filled with concrete.

Directly beside the Bietigheim Viaduct is the festival area of Bietigheim Bissingen, on which the Bietigheim Horse Market, a beer festival, takes place annually at the beginning of September.
