= Kusatsu, Gunma =

Kusatsu 草津町
- Town
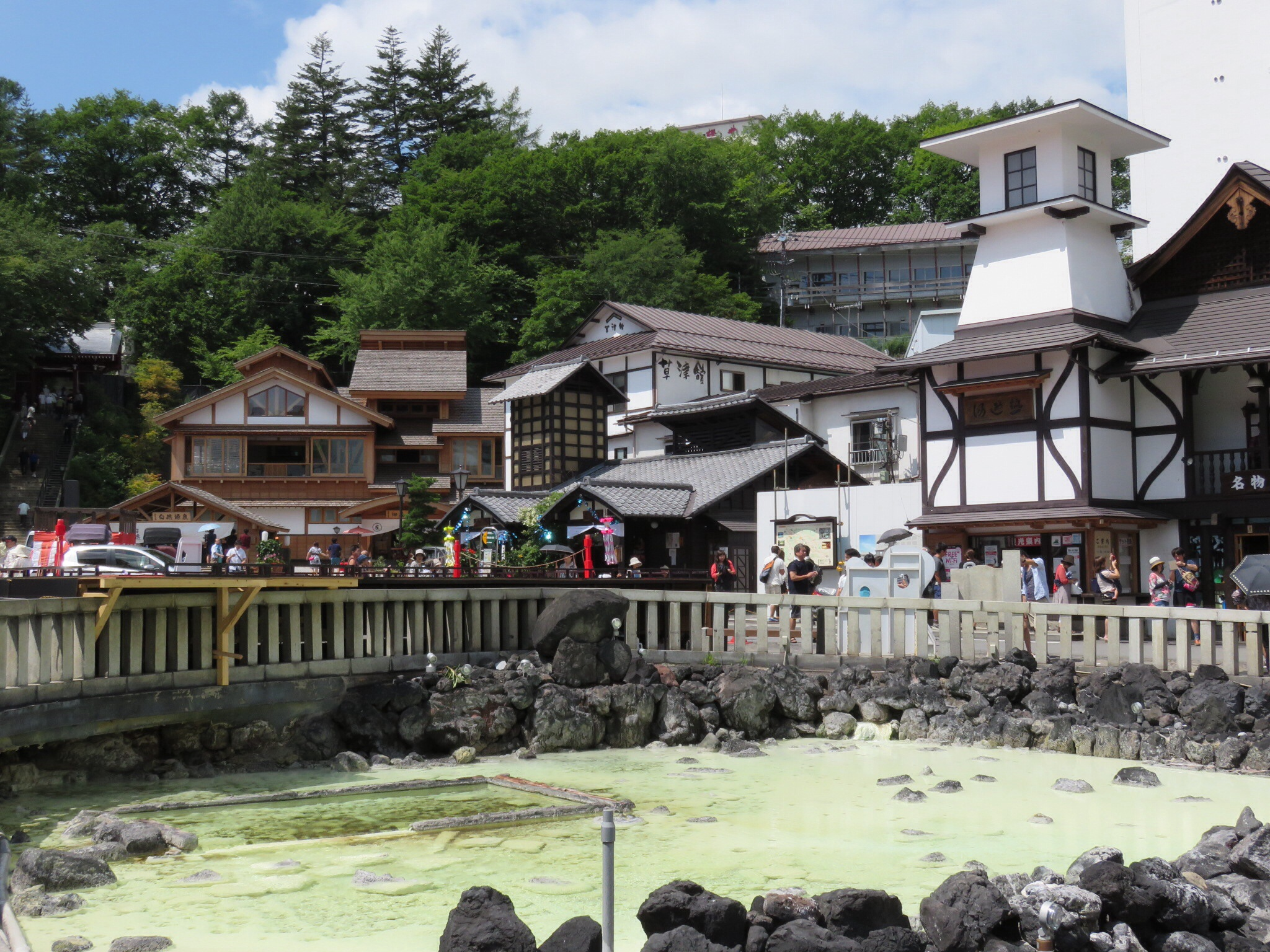
- Yubatake hot spring in the center of Kusatsu

- Flag Seal

- Location of Kusatsu in Gunma Prefecture

- Coordinates: 36°37′14.5″N 138°35′45.9″E
- Country: Japan
- Region: Kantō
- Prefecture: Gunma
- District: Agatsuma

Area
  - Total: 49.75 km^{2} (19.21 sq mi)

Population (September 2020)
  - Total: 6,255
  - Density: 125.7/km^{2} (325.6/sq mi)
- Time zone: UTC+9 (Japan Standard Time)
- Phone number: 0279-88-0001
- Address: 28 Kusatsu, Kusatsu-machi, Agatsuma-gun, Gunma-ken 377-1792
- Climate: Dfb
- Website: Official website
- Symbols
- Flower: Rhododendron subg. Hymenanthes

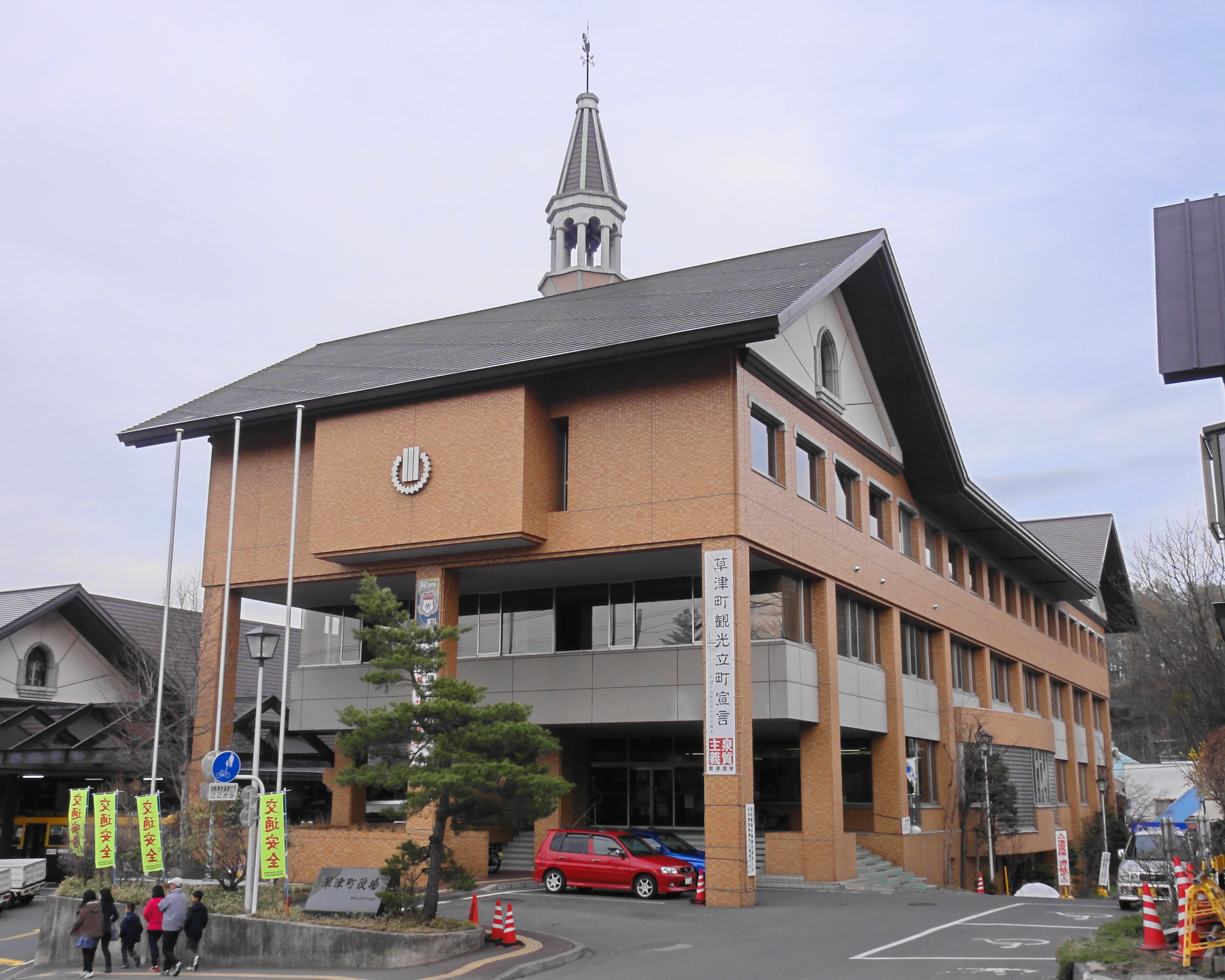
Kusatsu town hall

Kusatsu (草津町, Kusatsu-machi) is a town located in Gunma Prefecture, Japan. In September 2020, the town had a population of 6,255, in 3,407 households, and a population density of 130 persons per km^{2}. The total area of the town is 249.75 square kilometres (96.43 sq mi). Kusatsu is one of the most famous hot springs resorts in Japan.

== Geography ==
Kusatsu is situated about 1,200 meters above sea level. The active volcano Kusatsu-Shirane (2,160 m) and the inactive Mount Tengu (1,385 m) and Mount Motoshirane (2,171 m) are located west of Kusatsu.

=== Surrounding municipalities ===
Gunma Prefecture

- Naganohara
- Nakanojō
- Tsumagoi

Nagano Prefecture

- Takayama

== Climate ==
Kusatsu has a humid continental climate (Köppen Dfb) characterized by warm summers and cold winters with heavy snowfall. The average annual temperature in Kusatsu is 3.3 °C. The average annual rainfall is 1,711 mm. September is the wettest month. The temperatures are highest on average in August, at around 23.7 °C, and lowest in January, at around -1.4 °C. During the winter season the streets are kept free of snow using onsen water.

Climate data for Kusatsu (1991–2020 normals, extremes 1977–present)
Month	Jan	Feb	Mar	Apr	May	Jun	Jul	Aug	Sep	Oct	Nov	Dec	Year
Record high °C (°F)	12.4 (54.3)	15.5 (59.9)	19.8 (67.6)	25.5 (77.9)	27.6 (81.7)	32.0 (89.6)	31.0 (87.8)	31.3 (88.3)	29.1 (84.4)	26.5 (79.7)	20.7 (69.3)	17.8 (64.0)	32.0 (89.6)
Mean daily maximum °C (°F)	−0.4 (31.3)	0.7 (33.3)	4.7 (40.5)	11.5 (52.7)	17.0 (62.6)	19.6 (67.3)	23.4 (74.1)	24.2 (75.6)	19.8 (67.6)	14.5 (58.1)	9.1 (48.4)	2.9 (37.2)	12.3 (54.1)
Daily mean °C (°F)	−4.1 (24.6)	−3.6 (25.5)	−0.1 (31.8)	6.0 (42.8)	11.4 (52.5)	14.9 (58.8)	18.9 (66.0)	19.6 (67.3)	15.6 (60.1)	9.9 (49.8)	4.4 (39.9)	−1.2 (29.8)	7.6 (45.7)
Mean daily minimum °C (°F)	−7.8 (18.0)	−7.8 (18.0)	−4.5 (23.9)	1.1 (34.0)	6.5 (43.7)	11.1 (52.0)	15.5 (59.9)	16.2 (61.2)	12.3 (54.1)	6.0 (42.8)	0.4 (32.7)	−4.8 (23.4)	3.7 (38.7)
Record low °C (°F)	−15.5 (4.1)	−15.9 (3.4)	−12.6 (9.3)	−9.7 (14.5)	−4.6 (23.7)	2.8 (37.0)	8.2 (46.8)	6.5 (43.7)	1.7 (35.1)	−2.4 (27.7)	−7.3 (18.9)	−12.0 (10.4)	−15.9 (3.4)
Average precipitation mm (inches)	68.5 (2.70)	66.1 (2.60)	90.6 (3.57)	106.2 (4.18)	150.7 (5.93)	218.3 (8.59)	263.5 (10.37)	236.8 (9.32)	254.6 (10.02)	162.5 (6.40)	63.9 (2.52)	60.4 (2.38)	1,758.4 (69.23)
Average snowfall cm (inches)	175 (69)	156 (61)	149 (59)	38 (15)	0 (0)	0 (0)	0 (0)	0 (0)	0 (0)	0 (0)	9 (3.5)	112 (44)	644 (254)
Average precipitation days (≥ 1.0 mm)	11.6	10.7	11.5	11.0	12.2	15.8	18.2	16.2	14.4	11.1	8.2	10.9	152.3
Mean monthly sunshine hours	153.0	147.8	182.4	192.3	188.9	120.0	117.7	134.2	109.0	132.7	160.8	162.5	1,799.7
Source: Japan Meteorological Agency (1991–2020 normals, extremes 1977–present)

== Demographics ==
Per Japanese census data, the population of Kusatsu has declined over the past 40 years.

Historical population
Year	Pop.	±%
1920	2,720	—
1930	4,143	+52.3%
1940	7,538	+81.9%
1950	7,178	−4.8%
1960	7,933	+10.5%
1970	8,591	+8.3%
1980	9,341	+8.7%
1990	8,620	−7.7%
2000	7,702	−10.6%
2010	7,148	−7.2%
2020	6,049	−15.4%

== History ==
=== Yayoi period ===
The legendary origin of Kusatsu goes back to the second century during the Yayoi period. According to the legend, either Yamato Takeru or Yamabushi discovered the hot springs around Kusatsu; however, there is no historical evidence for either claim. Per legend, Yamato Takeru named Tsumagoi and Agatsuma after his wife ("tsuma" means "wife" in Japanese).

=== Kamakura period ===
Up to the 12th century there is no specific record of Kusatsu. Local folklore recounts that Minamoto no Yoritomo came to Kusatsu in 1193 in pursuit of fleeing Taira clan warriors. He then bathed in the Yubatake. The Gozaishi (御座石; illustrious seat, royal seat) on which Yoritomo sat, and the Yoritomo-gū (頼朝宮; Yoritomo Palace) in which he is said to have bathed, still exist. Kusatsu's history began in 1200 when the temple of Kōsenji was founded.

=== Sengoku period ===
Almost 400 years later, during the Sengoku period, there is more evidence for the existence of Kusatsu, which had grown into a hot-springs resort popular with wounded samurai. The Tokyo University Historiographical Book of Facsimiles (東大史料編纂所影写本, Tōdai shiryō hensanjo eishabon) contains correspondence during the year 1595 (Bunroku 4) between Tokugawa Ieyasu and Toyotomi Hideyoshi in which Hideyoshi recommended the Kusatsu hot springs to Ieyasu. The latter however, did not go to Kusatsu himself, but sent some servants to fetch some water from Kusatsu instead.

=== Edo period ===
During the Edo period, especially the Bakumatsu period, Kusatsu experienced unprecedented economic growth and became one of Japan's best-known hot springs. This was partly due to the increasing incidence of venereal diseases like gonorrhoea and syphilis, contracted in Tokyo red light districts like Yoshiwara, for which there was then no known cure besides bathing in a hot spring. The saying: "Kusatsu sengen Edo gamae" (草津千軒江戸構え) also goes back to this time and means: a thousand stores, just like in (the shopping districts in) Edo.

Hearing the praise of the Kusatsu Onsen the 8th Shōgun Tokugawa Yoshimune had hot-spring water drawn from the Yubatake source and transported into his castle for bathing. The area of present-day Kusatsu was part of the hatamoto-administered territory within Kōzuke Province during the Edo period.

=== Meiji period ===
In 1869, Kusatsu burned to the ground. The town was reconstructed within a few years, but the process left many local people in debt, causing the bankruptcy of many small enterprises, especially ryokans, over the next 20 years. At that time many of the inhabitants of Kusatsu abandoned the traditional practice of "Fuyuzumi" (冬住み), which meant leaving Kusatsu in wintertime and returning to their hometowns, located further down the mountains. Instead, the townspeople sold their old homes to repay their debts and began to live in Kusatsu all year long.

Kusatsu Village was created within Agatsuma District of Gunma Prefecture in April 1889, by the merger of former Kusatsu with Maeguchi and six other hamlets, with the creation of the modern municipalities system after the Meiji Restoration. In July 1900, the former Kusatsu and Maeguchi portions of the village was raised to town status, and the remaining portion formed Kuni village.

The infrastructure developed in the Meiji period and also people's knowledge, therefore many famous people were visiting Kusatsu. Especially foreigners were scientifically interested in this area, which became an important area for research of effects of hot springs, volcanoes etc.

In 1876, Erwin Bälz, a German internist came to Kusatsu for the first time. Bälz was one of the fathers of modern western medical science in Japan and court physician to Emperor Meiji. He was convinced of the healing power of the hot springs in Kusatsu, and began scientific research into them with a view to convincing the townspeople of the need to teach the correct application of the hot springs to Japanese medical doctors.

=== Taishō to Reiwa ===
In 1914, the Kusatsu ski club was founded.

The year 1915 saw the first visit of British Anglican missionary, Mary Cornwall Legh. In 1916 Cornwall Legh using her own funds established the St. Barnabas' Mission, providing residential care facilities to the sizable population of Hansen's Disease sufferers then present in the Yunosawa area of Kusatsu. Cornwall Legh devoted her remaining years to the care of the Kusatsu leprosy community, her work and dedication to this cause recognized with honors by the Japanese Government.

In 1941 the St. Barnabas' Hospital was closed, replaced by the, subsequently notorious, government run Kuryu Rakusen-en Sanatorium. St. Barnabas' Church and Cornwall Legh Park in Kusatsu attest to the charitable legacy of Mary Cornwall-Legh and the history of the community she sought to serve.

In 1926, the construction of the Kusakaru railway line (草軽電気鉄道, Kusakaru denki tetsudō) between Kusatsu and Karuizawa, which had been begun in 1908 was finished.

In 1948, a ski lift was erected on Mount Tengu, near Kusatsu. It was the first ski lift in Japan, with Kusatsu going on to become one of the country's first proper ski resorts.

==== Sexual assault hoax against mayor ====
In 2020, a local election in which over 90% of voters voted to recall town councillor Shoko Arai made international headlines. Arai, the only woman on the council, had accused mayor Nobutada Kuroiwa of sexually assaulting her. Kuroiwa denied the accusations, which triggered a backlash against Arai, who was accused of tarnishing the town's reputation with her allegations.

In December 2021, Arai filed a complaint against the mayor of the town for indecent assault. The Maebashi District Public Prosecutor's Office dismissed the complaint on the grounds that the mayor was not suspected. In response, the mayor filed a complaint against Arai for the crime of filing a false complaint. In October 2022 the Maebashi District Public Prosecutor's Office indicted Arai on charges of filing a false complaint and defamation against the mayor. In December 2022, Reiji Iizuka, a writer, stopped selling e-books meant to denounce the mayor and issued a statement apologizing to him.

On November 15, 2023, Arai's lawyer announced that Arai had admitted that her claim that the mayor had sexually assaulted her in the mayor's office was false, and that Arai would now claim in court that the mayor had touched her breasts and buttocks in his office.

On January 22, 2024, the Maebashi District Court found that there was no sexual activity between the mayor and Arai, and sentenced the writer, Iizuka, to one year in prison, suspended for three years, for defaming the mayor. According to prosecutors, Iizuka opposed the mayor's attempts to reform Kusatsu's hot spring management and published the e-book even though he knew Arai's testimony might be false.

On April 17, 2024, the Maebashi District Court ordered Arai to pay the mayor 2.75 million yen for defamation. This is a civil judgment.

On 29 September 2025, Shoko Arai was found guilty for falsely accusing the Kusatsu town mayor of rape, sentenced to two years in prison, suspended for five years. Arai did not appeal and the case was closed.

== Government ==
Kusatsu has a mayor-council form of government with a directly elected mayor and a unicameral town council of 12 members. Kusatsu, collectively with the other municipalities in Agatsuma District, contributes two members to the Gunma Prefectural Assembly. In terms of national politics, the town is part of Gunma 5th district of the lower house of the Diet of Japan.

== Economy ==
The town's main income is tourism. About 90% of the working population is employed in the tertiary sector, primarily in connection with its hot spring resorts, with very little industry and almost no agriculture.

== Education ==
Kusatsu has a public elementary school, Kusatsu Elementary School (草津町立草津小学校), and one public middle school, Kusatsu Junior High School (草津町立草津中学校), operated by the town government.

The town does not have a high school. Gunma Prefectural Board of Education operates prefectural high schools elsewhere.

== Transportation ==
=== Railway ===
In 1964, rail services to the town ceased after the closure of the nearby sulfur pit and the ensuing loss of freight traffic, which made operation of the line uneconomic. Bus services are offered at Kusatsu Onsen Bus Terminal.

=== Highway ===
- National Route 292

== Sister city relations ==
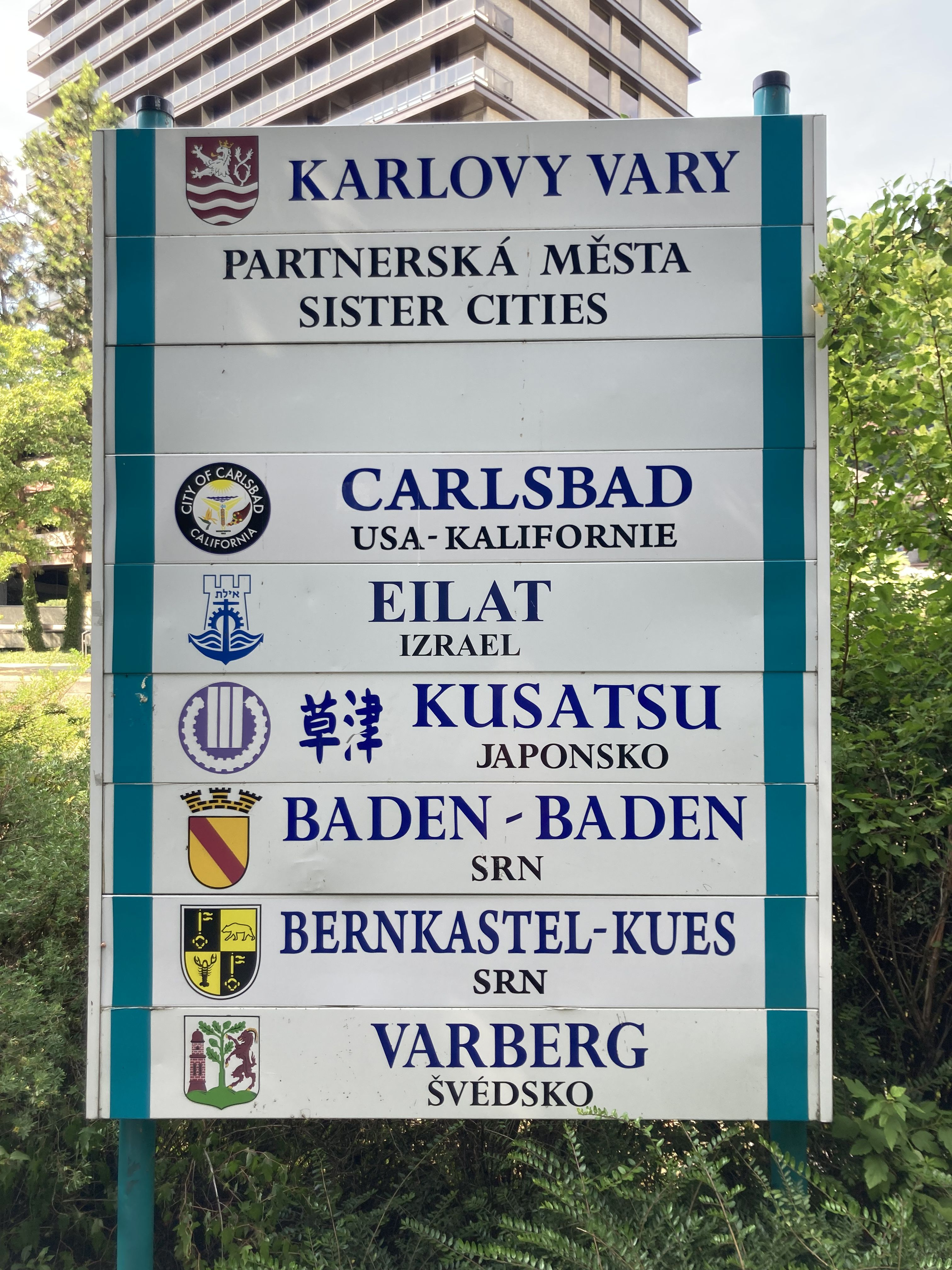
Sign of Karlovy Vary's sister cities

- Bietigheim-Bissingen, Germany since October 11, 1962. The town in which Kusatsu's benefactor Erwin Bälz was born. The contacts with this sister town are the most intensive. There is an annual student exchange.
- Hayama, Kanagawa, Japan, since March 29, 1969
- Kusatsu, Shiga, Japan, since September 8, 1997
- Karlovy Vary (Karlsbad, Carlsbad), Czech Republic since May 20, 1992. Spa resort town, was compared with Kusatsu by Erwin Bälz.
- Neustift, Austria since March 21, 1986. Winter sports resort town. Contact established through the Austrian national ski team.
- Snowy River, Australia since July 10, 1991. This town is located on the same latitude as Kusatsu, but in the southern hemisphere.

== Local attractions ==
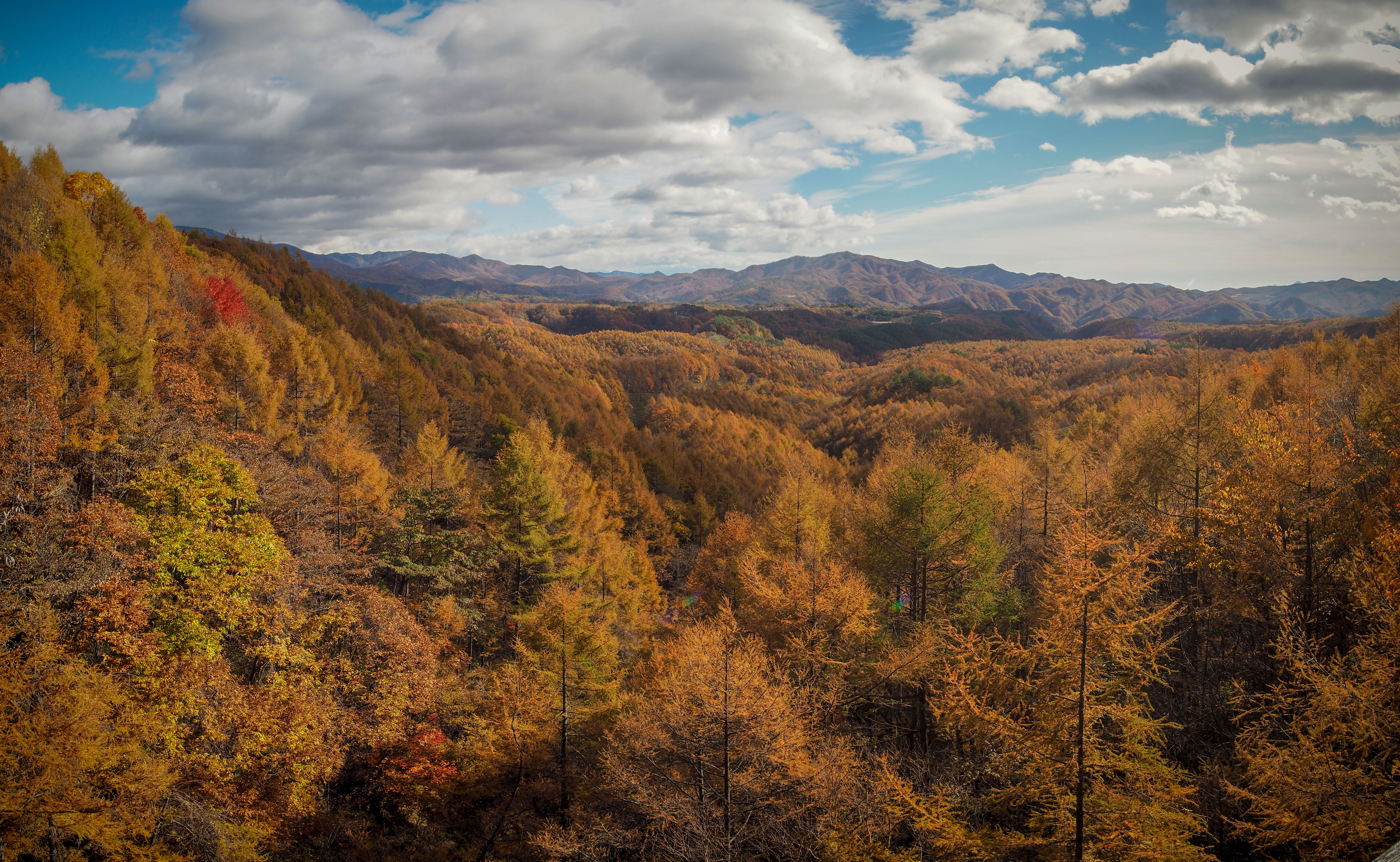
Autumn colours

=== Kusatsu Onsen ===
Various views of Yubatake, 2020

There are about 100 hot springs in Kusatsu with a total amount of about 34,000 liters water per minute pouring out of the ground. The water is sulfurous and acidic. The hot springs are said to help cure: arthralgia, stiff shoulders, paralysis, hardenings, bruises, sprains, chronic indigestion, hemorrhoids, chills, arteriosclerosis, burns, chronic gynecological disorders. The water from the natural hot springs is used not only for bathing but also for heating of the city's primary and secondary schools, the municipal welfare center, the streets during winter and many households, as well as for the municipal swimming pool.

The Yubatake, one of the biggest hot springs and the main attraction of the town, is located in the center of Kusatsu. The spring water pours out of the rock and is then conducted through several rows of wooden boxes. In these wooden boxes Yu no hana (湯の花) one of Kusatsu's specialties is cultivated. The word Yubatake means "hot water field".

Around the Yubatake, there are 100 name plates of famous persons that visited Kusatsu. Internationally well-known are: Erwin Bälz (German internist), Julius Scriba (German surgeon), Bruno Taut (German architect), Ernest Satow (British researcher of Japan and diplomat), Kakuei Tanaka (Japanese prime minister 1972 - 1974), Rikidōzan (famous pro wrestler). On the lower part of the Yubatake there is a small cascade and the rock has an emerald shade. This is one of the most popular spots for souvenir pictures.

- Netsu no yu (熱の湯, lit. "hot water"), though located adjacent to the Yubatake, is a hot spring in its own right. The water is about 54 degrees Celsius, so it is not possible to bathe in it. For that reason there is the ancient tradition of Yumomi (湯もみ), which means kneading or bashing the water. Using 1.80 meter long wooden boards the hot water is stirred, bashed, kneaded and thus cooled down. The simpler method of pouring in cold water is not practiced as it would dilute the healing power of the water. During the Yumomi ceremony, the Kusatsu song is sung and Japanese traditional dance is performed.
- Ōtaki no yu (大滝の湯; lit. "great waterfall hot spring") is named after spring water forming a waterfall. The building is made from wood and there is one basin on the inside and one on the outside (Rotenburo). Th
- Sai no kawara (西の河原, lit. "western riverbed") is an outside basin of approximately 500 m^{2}, which can be used by more than 100 guests at once. There are separate baths for men and women divided by a wooden fence. Located in a valley overflowing with hot springs claims to be one of the most beautiful rotenburo of Japan.
- The Bälz Onsen Center, situated on a plateau near Mount Tengu ski area, offers great scenery and is a popular Après-ski recreation spot.

=== Bälz Museum ===
The Bälz Museum is another of Kusatsu's attractions. Located at the entrance to Kusatsu, visitors can inform themselves about the life and work of Erwin Bälz. There is also a souvenir shop with goods mostly from Germany and the Czech Republic.

=== Flowers ===
Another of Kusatsu's attractions are the mountain flowers growing in and around the city. The most famous are:

- Watasuge (Eriophorum Vaginatum, Hare's tail cotton grass)
- Azumashakunage (Rhododendron Metternichii var. Japonica, a kind of Rhododendron)
- Ezorindō (Gentiana triflora var. Japonica, blue Gentian)
- Hakusanshakunage (Rhododendron brachycarpum, a kind of Rhododendron)
- Komakusa (Dicentra peregrina, a kind of Magnolia)
- Nanakamado (Sorbus commixta, Japanese Rowan)
- Rengetsutsuji (Rhododendron molle subsp. Japonicum, a kind of Azalea)
- Yanagiran (Epilobium angustifolium, Rosebay Willowherb)
- Zazensō (Simplocarpus foetidus, Skunk cabbage)

=== Festivals and events ===
During the year there are a number of traditional festivals as well as a number of events.

- Kusatsu International Summer Music Academy & Festival, in late August, which attracts famous musicians from all over Japan and abroad, and is often attended by members of the Japanese Imperial Household.
- Kōsenji flower festival (光泉寺花祭り, Kōsenji hanamatsuri) on 7–8 May. The children of the kindergarten near the Buddhist temple of Kōsenji pull an elephant made of paper around the Yubatake in celebration of Buddha's birthday.
- Ice-cave festival (氷室の節句, Himuro no Sekku) on the first of June. Ice is brought from a cave in Mt. Shirane, which was formed by an eruption of the volcano, and is used to make tea. According to folklore, anyone who drinks this special tea will not get ill in the following year.
- Onsen gratitude festival (温泉感謝祭り, Onsen kansha matsuri) held during the first three days of August. This traditional festival has its origins in the Ushiyu matsuri (丑湯祭り), which in accordance with the Chinese calendar is celebrated during the hottest time of the year on the day of the ox. According to the lore, those that bathe in an Onsen in the hour of the ox (one to three AM) will not get ill for one year. In contrast, today's ceremony is totally different: The goddess of Onsen descends the stairs at Kōsenji symbolizing the descent from heaven. She then gathers water from seven big hot springs in Kusatsu and distributes the water to the baths in Kusatsu. On the third day she ascends the stairs to Kōsenji, representing the ascent to heaven. Through this ceremony the blessing of the gods is granted, which will make sure that the springs won't run dry.
- Tour de Kusatsu (amateur bicycle race), Yuki no kairō walking (雪の回廊ウォーキング), (hiking through a valley of snow walls several meters high), soccer and skiing events.

=== Sports ===
The Thespakusatsu Gunma football club, although formed in and representing Kusatsu in the Japanese football league system, actually plays in Maebashi.

=== Souvenirs ===
- Amanattō (甘納豆) is a kind of sweet made of a special sort of highland beans, which does not bear fruit below 700 meters above sea level. First the beans are dried, then put into water and finally they are cooked in sugar. The details of the making process are a company secret.
- Manjū is a well-known Japanese sweet, consisting of a pastry crust made of flour, rice flour and buckwheat and a filling made of Azuki bean paste, and steamed using the steam rising from the hot springs.
- Yu no hana ("hot water flower") is a powder extracted from the hot water at the Yubatake and consists of dried mineral sediment (mostly sulfur), which enable one to recreate the onsen waters at home.

=== Lakes and waterfalls ===
There are a number of waterfalls and crater lakes in the vicinity of Kusatsu. The most famous ones are:

- Yugama (湯釜) located 2,100 meters above sea level is the crater lake of Mount Shirane. It boasts a very high acidity and an emerald-green surface.
- Yumiike (弓池; lit. "bow lake"), 2,000 meters above sea level is located between Mount Shirane and Mount Motoshirane. Its water is crystal clear.
- Ōsen no taki (嫗仙の滝) and the Jōfu no taki (常布の滝) are waterfalls near Kusatsu.

=== Ski area ===
The Kusatsu international ski area (草津国際スキー場, Kusatsu kokusai sukijō) on Mount Tengu and Mount Shirane is over 90 years old and is one of the main attractions of Kusatsu. The ski area extends from 2,100 meters to 1,300 meters above sea level. The snow quality is very good and there are ten different routes for all difficulty levels as well as twelve lifts. The longest route is eight kilometers long.

== Noted people from Kusatsu ==
- Kenji Ogiwara, Olympic gold medalist ski jumper
- Tsugiharu Ogiwara, Olympic gold medalist skier
- Ichita Yamamoto, politician
