= Erwin Bälz =

German physician in Imperial Japan (1849 – 1913)

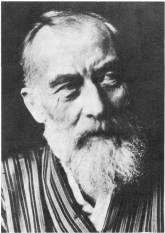
- Erwin Bälz
- Born: 13 January 1849; Bietigheim-Bissingen, Kingdom of Württemberg, German Confederation
- Died: 31 August 1913 (aged 64); Stuttgart, German Empire
- Occupations: Medicine, anthropology, foreign relations of Japan
- Known for: Foreign advisor to Meiji Japan
- Spouse: Hanako Hatsu Arai
- Children: 4

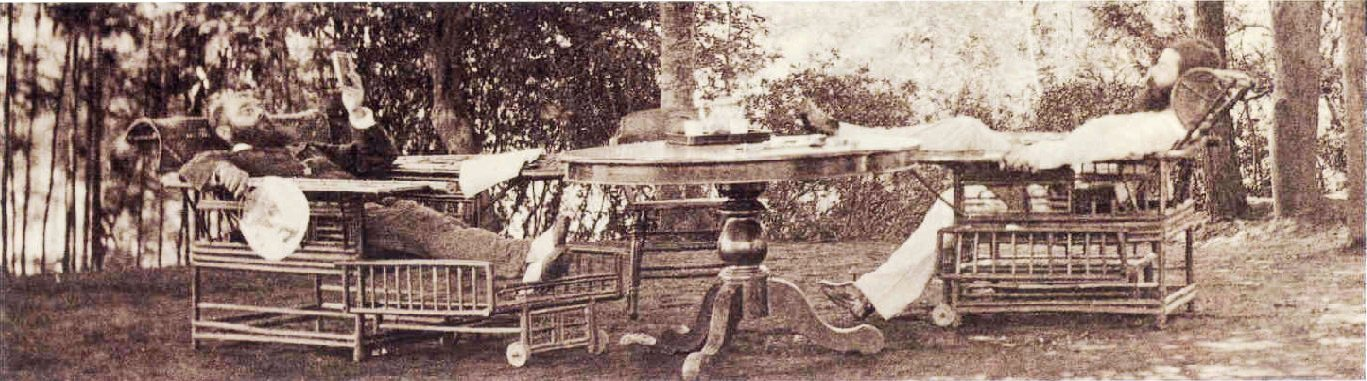
Bälz (left) and the German metallurgist Curt Netto in Japan

Erwin Otto Eduard von Bälz (German pronunciation: [ˈɛʁviːn ˈʔɔto ˈʔeːdu.aʁt fɔn ˈbɛlts]; 13 January 1849 – 31 August 1913), often simply known as Erwin Bälz (without the noble von particle), (Note: In German personal names, von is a preposition which approximately means 'of' or 'from' and usually denotes some sort of nobility. While von (always lower case) is part of the family name or territorial designation, not a first or middle name, if the noble is referred to by their last name, use Schiller, Clausewitz or Goethe, not von Schiller, etc.) was a German internist, anthropologist, and personal physician to the Japanese Imperial Family and cofounder of modern western medicine in Japan.

== Biography ==
The son of a contractor, Bälz was born in 1849 in Bietigheim-Bissingen in Germany. He attended grammar school in Stuttgart and studied medicine at University of Tübingen. He graduated at the age of 23, and subsequently worked at the medical department of the University of Leipzig in 1869, and served as a medic in the German army during the Franco-Prussian War in 1870. He returned to the University of Leipzig in 1875.

While at Leipzig, he treated a Japanese exchange student, which led to an offer by the Japanese government of a two-year contract with the Medical College of Tokyo Imperial University in 1876. Bälz's contract was renewed several times, and he ended up spending 27 years in Japan, the longest of any of the Oyatoi gaikokujin advisors. In 1881, he married a Japanese woman, Toda Hanako, and had four children.

During his stay in Japan, he tried to promote sports activity among the students of the Tokyo University, recommending unsuccessfully to revive the practice of jujutsu and kenjutsu. He trained personally kenjutsu under Kenkichi Sakakibara, and later was introduced to jujutsu master Hikosuke Totsuka, although he was discouraged from practicing jujutsu for being deemed at 30 supposedly too old to start in the art.

In the summer of 1899, Bälz visited the Korean capital Seoul and Busan and undertook ethnological investigations. From 22 April to 3 July 1903, he was again in Korea and, together with Richard Wunsch, undertook an expedition into the interior of the country.

In 1902, he was appointed personal physician-in-waiting to Emperor Meiji and the Imperial household of Japan.

Bälz taught more than 800 students in Western medicine during his tenure at the Tokyo Imperial University. During his stay in Japan, he treated some of the most influential men in the Meiji government, including Prime Ministers Itō Hirobumi and Yamagata Aritomo. On Bälz's initiative, the volcanic springs of Kusatsu (200 km away from Tokyo) were transformed into the most successful hot spring resort of Japan. He compared the area with the European spa resort of Karlsbad, and felt that mountainous air, as well as the clear waters, was very conducive to health.

Another medical contribution was the discovery and naming of "Mongolian spot". Finding an unrecorded feature of blue spots in Japanese babies, he thought these spots were characteristic of people of Mongolian origin.

In 1905, Bälz returned to Germany with his family. In Stuttgart, late in the summer of 1913, Bälz succumbed to heart disease.

== Legacy ==
Bälz was also an ardent art collector; the majority of the Japanese works collected by him are located at the Linden Museum in Stuttgart. A stone sculpture at his alma mater, University of Tübingen is a reminder of his contributions to Japanese medical science. In 1961, a sister city relationship between Kusatsu and Bietigheim-Bissingen was established.

After his death, his diary Das Leben eines deutschen Arztes im erwachenden Japan (1931, tr. The Diary of a German Doctor in Awakening Japan) was published, giving unique insights into Japan in the Meiji era.

In 1883, while staying at the Fujiya Hotel in Miyanoshita, Hakone, Bälz noticed that his maid's hands were chapped. He made a mixture of glycerin and water for her, which was later sold widely in Japan under the name of Bälz Water. It is also listed in the Japan Pharmacopoeia.

During his time in Japan, Bälz became a fan of judo, and is credited with introducing the sport to Germany.

In the year 2000, a commemorative museum honoring Bälz was erected in Kusatsu.

== Bibliography ==
- Baelz, Erwin. Awakening Japan: The Diary of a German Doctor. Indiana University Press (1974). Translated by Eden and Cedar Paul. ISBN 0-253-31090-3.
- Fujitani, T. Splendid Monarchy: Power and Pageantry in Modern Japan. University of California Press; Reprint edition (1998). ISBN 0-520-21371-8.
- Keene, Donald. Emperor Of Japan: Meiji And His World, 1852–1912. Columbia University Press (2005). ISBN 0-231-12341-8.
- Hasegawa, Akio. Hakone that Prof. Bälz loved
