= Markus Weicker =

German director and musician (born 1987)

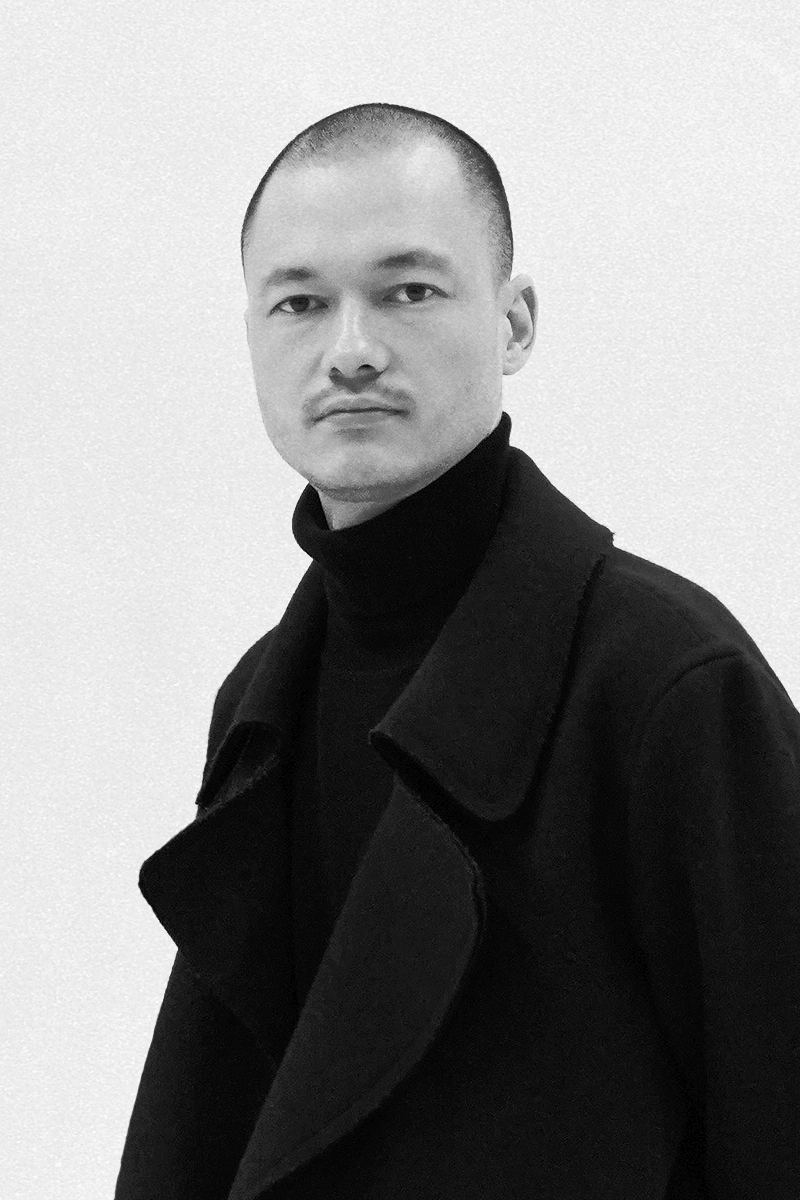
- Markus Weicker in 2019
- Born: 1987 (age 38–39)
- Occupations: Director; musician; producer

Markus Weicker (born December 17, 1987, in Offenbach am Main) is a German director and musician.

== Life ==
Weicker grew up in Offenbach am Main and studied architecture in Darmstadt. Under the name Gibmafuffi he produced for artists like Döll, Mädness, Morlockk Dilemma, Kool Savas, and Karate Andi; and released an EP and two instrumental albums: Trinkhallenromantik in 2014, Spielschulden in 2016, and Still Storch in 2019. His beats are influenced by the so-called Eastcoast sound of the 90s and are mostly produced analogue. He mainly uses samples.

In 2010, Weicker started the directing duo The Factory with his twin brother Michael. In the following years, the brothers released music videos for various German artists such as RIN, Kollegah, and Genetikk. At the same time, they began to realize projects in the advertising film industry. Since 2017 they have been under contract with the Berlin-based advertising production company BWGTBLD.

In 2016, Weicker started the label Division in Düsseldorf with his brother Michael and business partner Elvir Omerbegovic and signed the artist RIN. Two albums and a mixtape were released, which won several gold and platinum awards. They also received several Echo nominations as well as the 1-Live Krone for the best album in 2017. In the course of the releases there were three tours in German-speaking countries with a total of more than 175,000 viewers. In 2019, the label entered into a partnership with Sony Music in the form of a distribution deal.

== Discography ==
=== Albums ===
- 2014: Trinkhallenromantik (EP)
- 2016: Spielschulden
- 2019: Still Storch

=== As producer ===
- 2014: Döll – Weit entfernt (EP)
- 2014: Mädness – Maggo (EP)
- 2016: Karate Andi – Turbo
- 2017: Mädness & Döll – Ich und mein Bruder
- 2019: Döll – Nie oder Jetzt
- 2019: Morlockk Dilemma – Eros in Dystopolis

== Awards ==
=== As rights holder ===
Sources:

- 2017: Gold Record in Germany for RIN – Blackout
- 2017: Gold Record in Germany for RIN – Bros
- 2017: Platinum Record in Germany for RIN – Bros
- 2017: Gold Record in Austria for RIN – Bros
- 2017: Gold Record in Switzerland for RIN – Bros
- 2017: Gold Record in Germany for RIN – Monica Bellucci
- 2017: Platinum Record in Germany for RIN – Monica Bellucci
- 2017: Gold Record in Austria for RIN – Monica Bellucci
- 2017: Gold Record in Switzerland for RIN – Monica Bellucci
- 2018: Gold Record in Germany for RIN – Avirex
- 2018: Gold Record in Germany for RIN – Dior 2001
- 2018: Platinum Record in Germany for RIN – Dior 2001
- 2018: Gold Record in Austria for RIN – Dior 2001
- 2018: Platinum Record in Austria for RIN – Dior 2001
- 2019: Gold Record in Germany for RIN – Alien
- 2019: Gold Record in Germany for RIN – Fabergé
- 2019: Gold Record in Germany for RIN – Keine Liebe
- 2019: Gold Record in Germany for RIN – Vintage

=== Artist awards with share as rights holder ===
- 2017: 1LIVE Krone RIN – Eros Best Album
- 2018: Echo Nomination RIN – Eros Best Production
- 2018: Echo Nomination RIN Newcomer of the Year
- 2019: 1LIVE Krone Nomination RIN Best Hip-Hop Act

=== As director ===
- 2012: Voice Independent Music Award Asia – Best Music Video
- 2012: Nomination MTV Music Asia Awards – Best Music Video
- 2013: Gold Record in Germany for Genetikk – DNA
- 2013: Gold Record in Germany for Kollegah, Farid Bang – JBG2
- 2013: Gold Record in Germany for Kollegah, Farid Bang – JBG2
- 2014: CCA Award Silber
- 2014: Cannes Lions International Festival of Creativity Shortlist
- 2014: Gold Record in Germany for Kollegah – King
- 2014: Triple Gold Record in Germany for Kollegah – King
- 2014: Platinum Record in Germany for Kollegah – King
- 2014: Platinum Record in Austria for Kollegah – King
- 2014: Gold Record in Germany for Kollegah – Alpha
- 2015: Gold Record in Germany for Genetikk – Achter Tag
- 2015: Gold Record in Germany for Kollegah – ZHT4
- 2015: Platinum Record in Germany for Kollegah – ZHT4
- 2015: Gold Record in Austria for Kollegah – ZHT4
