= FM4 Frequency Festival =

Music festival in Austria

The FM4 Frequency Festival, also Frequency Festival or just Frequency, formerly Vienna City Festival, is a music festival. Until 2008, it took place near Salzburg Austria, usually every August. In 2009, the Festival moved to St. Pölten. It is promoted by one of Austria's national radio stations, FM4, and is generally associated with the alternative part of mainstream music. The lineups accumulate acts of various genres such as rock, electronica and hip hop, usually covering great parts of the German and Austrian alternative, indie and guitar pop scenes, but also featuring well-known international top acts.

== History ==
The festival was established in 2001. The first year it took place as a rather small event featuring six artists on each of the two days of the festival.

For 2002's festival the Salzburgring, normally used as a motor-bike racetrack, was selected.

The 2003 festival was both a success and a disappointment. One of the major Austrian concert organizers–promoters and business rivals of Musicnet, Wiesen, who are also in charge of famous Austrian festivals like the Jazz Fest, Forestglade and Two Days A Week, decided to have Metallica perform in the stadium of Salzburg, only about 20 km away from the Salzburgring, on the second day of the Frequency festival. Musicnet feared loss of audience due to the Metallica concert and after several days of negotiation, Metallica were booked to headline the second day of the FM4 Frequency festival. Organization was devastating as the masses could not be handled by the security personnel. Logistic and sanitary problems were the result and it was seen by a number of critics as a miracle that there were almost no serious injuries and not even a single death. Even Musicnet thanked the audience for being disciplined as they were and not panicking when they were stuck in the masses. According to multiple guests the situation was critical during a rain shower, when the audience was seeking shelter under the tent. It is rumoured that financially the festival was more of a break-even business than a success and Musicnet has refused to supply any information regarding this.

2004 was the back to the roots year, with 40 bands playing on 13 and 14 August. Fans of the original Frequency festival were disappointed about it becoming just another huge mainstream festival, and so Musicnet tried to reestablish the situation of 2002. Not mainly by allowing less attendance, although ticket contingents were limited now, but by expanding the area and replacing the tent stage by a second open air stage. The festival was overshadowed by a huge storm with winds up to 140 km/h during the first night and constant, intense rain showers during the second day. This severe storm that lasted 25 hours without respite caused a number of guests to leave early.

2005 suffered from typical problems of Austrian festivals of that year: On the one hand, multiple last-minute cancellations of band performances, but on the other mainly grasslands getting flooded by rain that had lasted weeks already before the festival began and that largely continued during the festival too. Besides making it virtually impossible to walk through the – at times more than 50 cm deep – mud on the camping sites and on the way to the stages, almost all cars had to be towed to the road by tractors on departure, because they could not move on the parking sites that were exclusively on grassland. Furthermore, the rain was the final reason why a bridge connecting the inner race track (where the main stage is) with the outer race track (where the camping sites are accessible from) collapsed on the evening of the second day. 31 people were injured, although none seriously, but a panic could be averted, mainly thanks to the coincidence that the Red Cross tent was close to the bridge. The organisers secured and illuminated the area and arranged pathways for ambulances to come in and pick up the injured. Despite harsh criticism, it later turned out the organisers were not directly guilty of the event. They had hired a construction company that built the fundament of materials not suitable for outdoor use, unlike what had been agreed on. Pioneers of the Federal Armed Forces of Austria (the Bundesheer) constructed a replacement bridge out of aluminium and steel that very night, so that it could be used on the remaining, third day.

In 2006, 43 bands performed on 17 and 18 August. As an exception the festival lasted only for two days and the headliners were Muse and Franz Ferdinand.

In 2007, Die Ärzte, Nine Inch Nails, The Kaiser Chiefs and Seeed, performed between 15 and 17 August. One of the most talked about sets of the festival was that of Nine Inch Nails, in which they were booked between Die Ärzte and The Beatsteaks, meaning that they were booked between two German bands and as a result, were forced to play in front of a crowd who came to see both bands and saw NIN as an interval act. A number of people in attendance were sitting on the floor and spoke into their cellphones while the band were performing. This caused Trent Reznor to ask the crowd why they were there and who they were going to see, before asking the crowd if they were booked between two German bands. Some people in the crowd chanted for NIN, with Trent then asking why they were there looking bored when they could see other bands. At the end of the show, the band intentionally destroyed a camera which took a while for the tripod to be replaced. Reznor later posted on the band's blog that it was their worst show of the tour, with the worst audience alongside a picture of a Bratwurst.

The 2020 and 2021 editions had to be cancelled due to the COVID-19-pandemic.

== Past lineups ==
- 2001: 2Raumwohnung, Afrob, Blumfeld, Echophonic, Eins Zwo, Fiva & Radrum, Heinz aus Wien, Nina, Seeed, Slut, Stereo Total, Total Chaos
- 2002: Die Ärzte, Attwenger, Bauchklang, Blumentopf, Chima, Curse, Das Pop, Donots, Emil Bulls, Fiva MC, Gentleman, Heinz aus Wien, Jugendstil, Kosheen, Lambretta, Naked Lunch, Naked Raven, Rival Schools, Schönheitsfehler, Shyne 11, Slut, Sneaker Pimps, Son Goku feat. Thomas D, Sonic Youth, Sportfreunde Stiller, Die Sterne, Such A Surge, Telepopmusik, The (International) Noise Conspiracy, The Leaves, The Tarantinos, Tocotronic, Turntablerockers, Zeronic, Zuka
- 2003: 3 Feet Smaller, Absolute Beginner, Alien Ant Farm, Ash, Bauchklang, Beck, Biffy Clyro, blackmail, Blumfeld, Bright Eyes, Caesars, Christoph und Lollo, Comaah, Console, De Phazz, Die Goldenen Zitronen, Grandaddy, Heather Nova, International Pony, Jugendstil, Kante, Kettcar, Kinderzimmer Productions, Ladytron, Louie Austen, Main Concept, Metallica, Nova International, Petsch Moser, Placebo, Puppet Mastaz, Seeed, Sportfreunde Stiller, Tahiti 80, Terrorgruppe, The Notwist, The Seesaw, Tomte, Travis, Wir sind Helden, XPloding Plastix
- 2004: 2Raumwohnung, 3 Feet Smaller, Adam Green, Apocalyptica, Die Ärzte, Ash, Blumentopf, Coshiva, Crash, Curbs, The Dandy Warhols, The Darkness, Dashboard Confessional, Delays, Donots, Faithless, Die Fantastischen Vier, Groove Armada, Guadalajara, Hörspielcrew, Jellybeat, Jugendstil, Julia, Keane, Kings of Leon, Lockdown Project, Mando Diao, Max Herre, Mondo Generator, Olli Schulz und der Hund Marie, Patrice, Radio 4, The Roots, Seeed, Slut, Die Sterne, Tigerbeat, Turntablerocker, Whyte Seeds
- 2005: 2 Many DJs, Adam Green, Asian Dub Foundation, Beatsteaks, Bolzplatz Heroes, Culcha Candela, Danko Jones, De Phazz, Die Toten Hosen, Editors, Farin Urlaub, Flogging Molly, Foo Fighters, Gentleman, Hot Hot Heat, Incubus, Infadels, Jan Feat. U.D.S.S.R, Julia, Kante, Kosheen, Ladytron, Massive Töne, MXPX, Northern Lite, Oasis, Pink As A Panther, Queens of the Stone Age, Roots Manuva, She-Male Trouble, Soulwax, Sportfreunde Stiller, Stereo Total, Tamato, The Blue Van, The Bunny Situation, The Coral, The Jessica Fletchers, The Others, The Raveonettes, The Subways, Weezer, When The Music's Over, William White Tocotronic, The Futureheads, The Subways, The Dresden Dolls, Babyshambles, Fall Out Boy, Doves, Senses Fail, Moneybrother cancelled.
- 2006: 3 Feet Smaller, Arctic Monkeys, Art Brut, Bauchklang, Belle & Sebastian, The Bishops, Blumfeld, Body Count feat. Ice-T., Broken Social Scene, Calexico, Coheed and Cambria, Cursive, Eagles of Death Metal, Editors, Fettes Brot, Franz Ferdinand, The Futureheads, Gods of Blitz, Goldenhorse, Joy Denalane, Kaiser Chiefs, Kaizers Orchestra, Kettcar, Less Than Jake, Lostprophets, Mando Diao, Mauf, Mohair, Morningwood, Morrissey, Muse, Nada Surf, The Paddingtons, Paolo Nutini, The Robocop Kraus, Scissor Sisters, Snow Patrol, Soulwax Nite Versions, Sugarplum Fairy, The Prodigy, Tomte, We Are Scientists, Wir sind Helden
- 2007: Nine Inch Nails, Die Ärzte, The Dandy Warhols, Seeed, Kaiser Chiefs, Beatsteaks, Interpol, Snow Patrol, Billy Talent, Fall Out Boy, The Good, the Bad & the Queen, Mika, Groove Armada, MIA., Jan Delay & Disco No1, Juliette & The Licks, ...And You Will Know Us By The Trail Of Dead, Jimmy Eat World, Millencolin, Silverchair, Tocotronic, 2Raumwohnung, !!!, Eagles of Death Metal, Sugarplum Fairy, Shout Out Louds, The View, The Sounds, Fotos, Vanilla Sky, Ghosts, Hellogoodbye. Tool, Manic Street Preachers, Chris Cornell, Mutemath, Tokyo Police Club, Peeping Tom, Mika, +44 and Klaxons cancelled.
- 2008: R.E.M., The Killers, Die Fantastischen Vier, Travis, Flogging Molly, Dropkick Murphys, Adam Green, Madsen, Chikinki, Julia, Kontrust, Justice, Get Well Soon, Blackmail, Slut, Pendulum, Itchy Poopzkid, Pardon Ms. Arden, The Hives, Maxïmo Park, Patrice, The Roots, i am X, Iron & Wine, Teitur, Year Long Disaster, Adam Freeland, Nneka, The Wombats Babyshambles cancelled.
- 2009: Kasabian, Radiohead, Peter Fox, Jet, Bloc Party, Eagles of Death Metal, Culcha Candela, Dúné, Enter Shikari, Kettcar, Mando Diao, Mono & Nikitaman, Farin Urlaub Racing Team, Rise Against, The (International) Noise Conspiracy, Pendulum, The Prodigy, The Sounds, The Subways, Volbeat.
- 2010: Muse, Die Toten Hosen, Massive Attack and Martina Topley-Bird, Billy Talent, Serj Tankian, Jan Delay, Skunk Anansie, Element of Crime, Fettes Brot, Tocotronic, Wir sind Helden, Thirty Seconds to Mars, LCD Soundsystem, NOFX, La Roux, Klaxons, The Specials, Hot Chip, Bad Religion, The Gaslight Anthem. Performances of Black Rebel Motorcycle Club and Ou Est Le Swimming Pool were cancelled.
- 2011: Foo Fighters, Seeed, Rise Against, Dropkick Murphys, Good Charlotte, Simple Plan, Apocalyptica, The Chemical Brothers, Kasabian, Panic! at the Disco, Kasabian.
- 2012: Korn, Placebo, The Killers, The Cure, The Black Keys, Enter Shikari, Sportfreunde Stiller.
- 2013: System of a Down, Die Toten Hosen, Tenacious D, Franz Ferdinand, Billy Talent, Flogging Molly, Fall Out Boy, Pennywise, Skunk Anansie.
- 2014: Macklemore & Ryan Lewis, Bastille, Biffy Clyro, Queens of the Stone Age, Skrillex, Placebo, Blink-182, Imagine Dragons, Parov Stelar, Jan Delay, Snoop Dogg, Rudimental, Babyshambles, Woodkid, Ska-P, Marteria, Milky Chance, Broilers, Stromae, Jimmy Eat World, Millencolin, Prinz Pi, Skindred, HVOB, Fiva, Brody Dalle, William Fitzsimmons, Satellite Stories, Claire, Kadavar, The Eclectic Moniker, Bo Ningen, Hozier, You Me at Six, Tourist, Giuda, Arthur Beatrice, Fritz Kalkbrenner, Pendulum, Modestep, Borgore, Zomboy, Moonbootica, Example, Felix da Housecat, Wilkinson, Chet Faker, Congorock, Dumme Jungs, Metrik, Phonat, The Young Punx, Dubesque, Space Echo, Milk Drinkers
- 2015: Linkin Park, The Prodigy, The Chemical Brothers, The Offspring, Interpol, Alt-J, Casper, Ellie Goulding, Major Lazer, Martin Garrix, Nero, Fritz Kalkbrenner, The Script, Bad Religion
- 2016: Deichkind, Damian "Jr. Gong" Marley, Bilderbuch, Paul Kalkbrenner, Parov Stelar, Sportfreunde Stiller, Rudimental, Bring Me the Horizon, Manu Chao La Ventura, Massive Attack, Die Antwoord, Limp Bizkit
- 2017: Billy Talent, The Offspring, Moderat, At the Drive-In, Dame, The Pretty Reckless, Kytes, Bilderbuch, Placebo, Robin Schulz, Cypress Hill, Galantis, George Ezra, Birdy, Breaking Benjamin, Mumford & Sons, Wiz Khalifa, Flume, Rise Against, Wanda, Kraftklub, Band of Horses
- 2018: Gorillaz, Bastille, Die Antwoord, Trailerpark, Dropkick Murphys, Yung Hurn, Käptn Peng & Die Tentakel von Delphi, Macklemore, Hardwell, Flogging Molly, Broilers, RAF Camora & Bonez MC, Mando Diao, Afrojack, Kygo, Casper, The Kooks, Timmy Trumpet, Vini Vici, Left Boy, The Vaccines, Imagine Dragons, Kaleo, Sum 41, Lost Frequencies, Papa Roach, Zugezogen Maskulin
- 2019: Twenty One Pilots, Sunrise Avenue, Alligatoah, Swedish House Mafia, Prophets of Rage, G-Eazy, Macklemore, Dimitri Vegas & Like Mike

== See also ==
- FM4
