= Mine (singer) =

German songwriter and singer (born 1986)

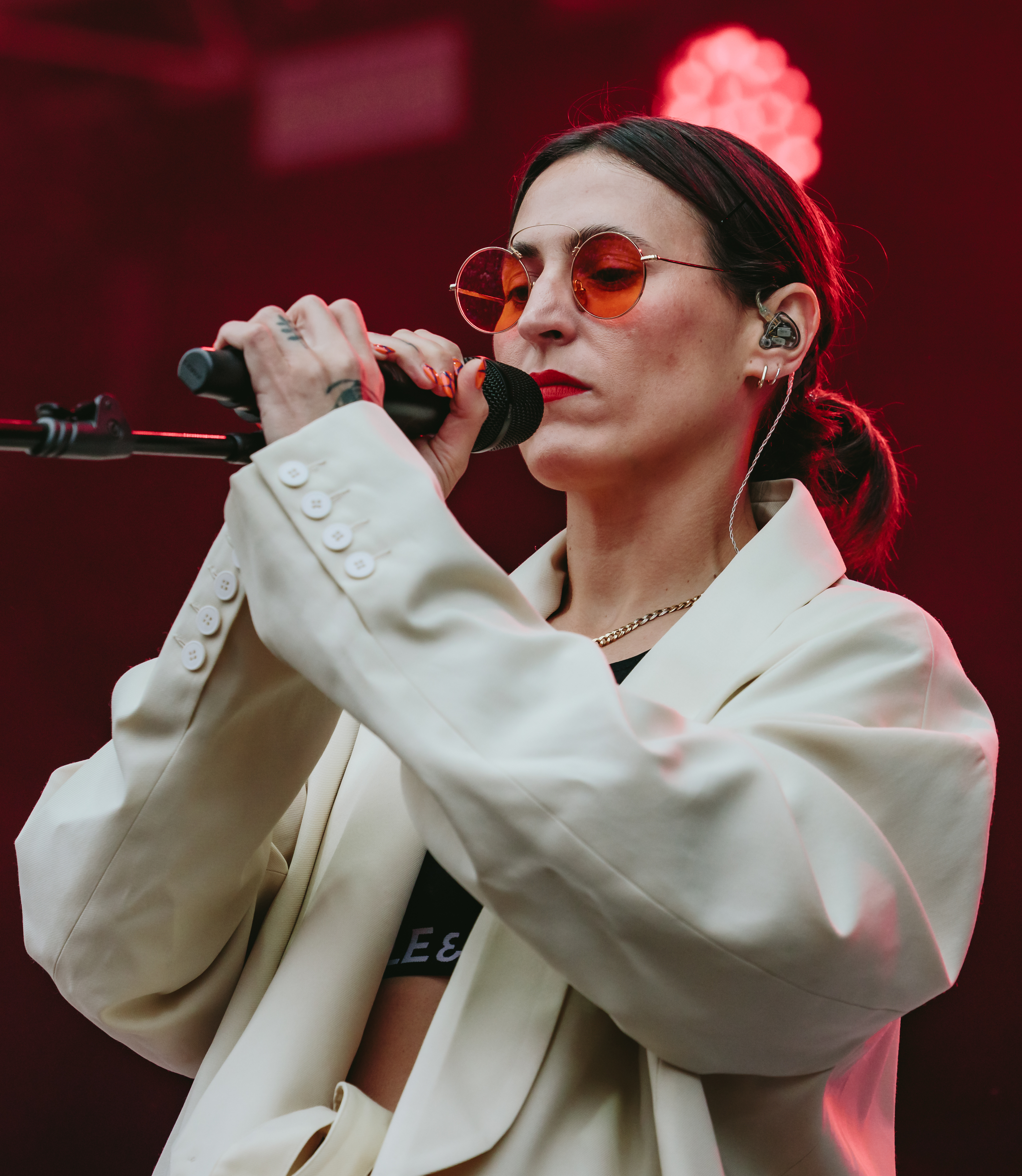
- Mine at Rocken am Brocken in 2023

Background information
- Born: Jasmin Stocker; January 19, 1986 (age 40); Stuttgart, Germany
- Website: minemusik.de

Jasmin Stocker (born 19 January 1986 in Stuttgart), known professionally as Mine [ˈmiːnə], is a German singer-songwriter.

== Early life ==
Mine grew up in Remshalden near Stuttgart, and attended the Remstal-Gymnasium Weinstadt. As a child, she took part in singing competitions and took music and vocal lessons. Starting in her early 20s, she studied vocal jazz at the Mainz School of Music. After completing her bachelor's degree she taught at the school while studying towards her master's degree in producing and composing at the Popakademie Baden-Württemberg.

== Career ==
Mine had her first performances of her own repertoire during her time as a student, choosing the stage name Mine, a childhood nickname of hers.

Her first tour was in 2013. At her live performances, she includes a wide range of instruments, including bass, guitar, drums, electronic piano, organ, toy piano, autoharp, omnichord, metallophone, vibraphone, viola and violin.

In 2013 she also published her first EP: Herzverleih ("heart for rent"), including ten tracks, co-produced by herself and Florian Sitzmann. Mine produced her first official music video to accompany the song Du scheinst ("you seem"), which first appeared on Herzverleih.

In March 2013, to finance a concert in the Capitol in Mannheim, Mine started a crowdfunding campaign, which raised over 10000 Euros in 80 days. The concert, which was sold out, featured songs that Mine had arranged herself for a chamber orchestra that she had assembled for this event. The recording was released as a live DVD.

In the same month as this concert, Mine appeared as a guest on, among others, the ZDFkultur shows TV Noir and Nate Light, and was nominated as "Best Newcomer“ at the inaugural VIA VUT Indie Awards. In September 2013 Mine released her second Single, Hinterher ("following").

In 2013, Mine opened for Lukas Graham, Samy Deluxe, Megaloh, Dear Reader and Enno Bunger. In März 2014 nahm Mine she recorded the song Offenes Herz ("open heart") with the Hamburg Rapper Samy Deluxe, which appeared on his album Männlich ("Male").

In October 2014, Mine's debut album Mine was published by the Berlin label Styleheads Music. Before the album release, two singles were released: Der Mond lacht ("The Moon laughs") (May 2014), and Ziehst du mit ("Are you coming along?") (September 2014). Ziehst du mit was released in four different versions, each with its own music video. In each of these versions, a different rapper performs the first verse, respectively Fatoni, FlowinImmO, Textor (Kinderzimmer Productions) and Curlyman. The album release was followed by a major tour in October/November 2014 and January/February 2015.

Starting in October 2014, Mine appeared with three other artists on season 17 of Startrampe, which was broadcast on BR, ARD-alpha and Einsfestival.

In 2015, Mine appeared with Die Orsons on their song Wasserburgen ("water castles") on the album What’s Goes? and with Edgar Wasser on the song Aliens. In April 2016, her second album Das Ziel ist im Weg ("the goal is in the way") was released. The album features the rapper Fatoni and the singer Dagobert. The first single from the album, Katzen ("cats") was released on 11 March 2016.

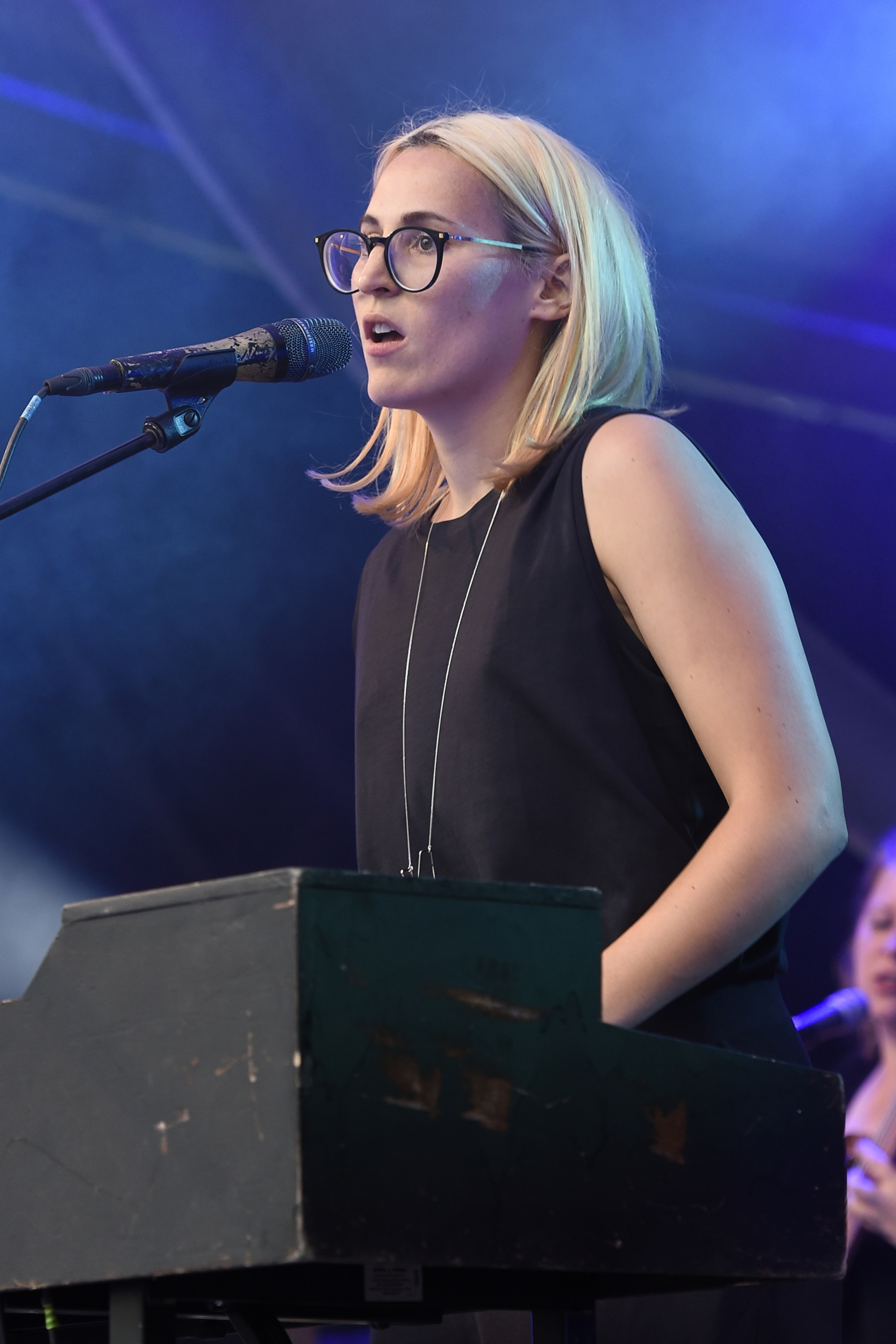
Mine at Bochum Total in 2016

In September 2016, Mine won the Preis für Popkultur in the category "favourite female solo performer".

In October 2016 Mine financed another live orchestra performance in the Berlin club Huxley's Neue Welt, achieving the funding goal in less than half of the allotted time, and collecting almost 32000 Euros. The concert took place on 22 April 2017, again featuring orchestral arrangements by Mine. Fatoni, Edgar Wasser, Bartek Nikodemski, Grossstadtgeflüster, Textor, Tristan Brusch, Ecke Prenz, Haller and the Berliner Kneipenchor made guest appearances. The live recording was published in February 2018.

Im June 2017 Mine starred in the music video of Keinen Tag tauschen ("don't exchange a day") by Dexter and produced by Urban Tree Media.

On 13 October 2017 the collaborative album Alle Liebe Nachträglich ("all love belatedly") by Mine and Fatoni was released under the label Caroline International Records. They followed the release with a joint tour in December 2017.

The single Spiegelbild ("mirror image"), created in cooperation with the artist duo AB Syndrom, was published on 19 October 2018. This was followed by a joint appearance on Neo Magazin Royale. In autumn 2018 they had a trio tour across Germany, where they debuted three new songs. In April 2019 Mine released her new Album Klebstoff ("adhesive") under Caroline Records. Her music video for the track 90 Grad ("90 degrees") received the "Listen To Berlin" award.

In March 2021 Mine won the GEMA German Music Authors' Prize in the category chanson/song. In the same year she won the "favourite female solo artist" Preis für Popkultur prize, as well as the "favourite video" prize for the song Song Hinüber ("gone off") (feat. Sophie Hunger). The video was by the German artist Dominik Schmitt, who designed the cover of Mine's debut album in 2014.

Her fourth studio album Hinüber appeared on 30 April 2021 and achieved 13th place on the German album charts. Mine had written the string arrangements for the album Das ist alles von der Kunstfreiheit gedeckt ("that is all covered by artistic freedom") by Danger Dan, that appeared on the same day and reached first place in the album charts.

On 28 January 2024 Mine performed her song Ich weiß es nicht ("I don't know") on Till Reiners’ Happy Hour auf.

Her 5th studio album, Baum ("Tree") appeared on 2 February 2024 and reached place 7 on the German album charts.

== Genre ==
In 2014 Laut.de classified her music as "German language Folk with Hip Hop, Jazz and Electronic elements". Malte Borgmann (Startrampe) described the music on her debut album as "carefully arranged, poetic songwriter-pop with a touch of jazz and electronic influences". „Pop mit einem Schuss Deutschrap“ nannte Julia Freese of Tagesspiegel described her music as "Pop with a shot of Deutschrap". Mine's lyrics are a central part of her songwriting process.

== Releases ==
Album	Chart	Placement	Date	Duration
Das Ziel ist im Weg	DE	81	2016-04-22	1 week
Alle Liebe nachträglich (with Fatoni)	DE	47	2017-10-20	1 week
Klebstoff	DE	28	2019-04-19	2 weeks
Hinüber	DE	13	2021-05-07	3 weeks
Hinüber	AT	69	2021-05-14	1 week
Baum	DE	7	2024-02-09	1 week

=== Albums ===
- 2014: Mine
- 2016: Das Ziel ist im Weg
- 2017: Alle Liebe nachträglich (with Fatoni)
- 2018: Mine und Orchester (Live in Berlin)
- 2019: Klebstoff
- 2021: Hinüber
- 2024: Baum

=== Singles ===
- 2013: Du scheinst
- 2013: Hinterher
- 2014: Der Mond lacht
- 2014: Ziehst Du mit
- 2015: Aliens (Maxi-Single with Edgar Wasser)
- 2015: Luft Nach Unten (Maxi-Single mit Edgar Wasser)
- 2016: Katzen
- 2016: Das Ziel ist im Weg
- 2016: Essig auf Zucker
- 2017: Alle Liebe nachträglich (withFatoni)
- 2017: Romcom (with Fatoni)
- 2018: Spiegelbild (with AB Syndrom)
- 2019: Klebstoff
- 2019: 90 Grad
- 2019: Einfach so (feat. Giulia Becker)
- 2019: Ziehst du mit
- 2021: Unfall
- 2021: Mein Herz
- 2021: Elefant
- 2023: Ich weiß es nicht
- 2023: Nichts ist umsonst
- 2024: Danke Gut (feat. Mauli)
- 2024: Was hab ich nur getan? (feat. Nicola Rost)

=== Concert recordings ===
- 2013: Mine & Orchester – Live in Mannheim
- 2018: Mine und Orchester (Live in Berlin)
- 2019: Mine mit Band (Live bei PULS Open Air 2019)

=== Features ===
- 2014: Ziehst Du mit (feat. curlyman)
- 2014: Ziehst Du mit (feat. Textor)
- 2014: Ziehst Du mit (feat. FlowinImmO)
- 2014: Ziehst Du mit (feat. Fatoni)
- 2014: Offenes Herz (Samy Deluxe feat. Mine)
- 2015: Wasserburgen (Die Orsons feat. Mine)
- 2015: Fragezeichen (DJ Vito feat. Mine)
- 2015: Aliens (feat. Edgar Wasser)
- 2015: Bunt (Manuel Halter feat. Mine)
- 2016: Kleid deiner Mutter (Karate Andi feat. Nico (K.I.Z) and Mine)
- 2017: Keinen Tag tauschen [Mine Remix] (Dexter feat. Mine)
- 2018: Spiegelbild (feat. AB Syndrom)
- 2019: Guter Gegner (feat. Grossstadtgeflüster)
- 2019: Einfach so (feat. Giulia Becker)
- 2019: Schwer bekömmlich (feat. Bartek Nikodemski, Haller & Dissy)
- 2019: Weihnachtszeit Traurigkeit (Tristan Brusch feat. Mine, Sam Vance-Law, Charlotte Brandi, Bayuk, Luca Vasta, Isabel Ment, Fatoni, Ramnäs)
- 2020: Spiegelverkehrt (AB Syndrom feat. Mine)
- 2020: Gehst du davon (Kaltenkirchen feat. Mine)
- 2020: Wasser ohne Sprudel (Viva con Agua Remix) (MC Smook, Audio88, Juicy Gay, Mine, Lilian Mbabazi)
- 2021: freak. (Dissy feat. Mine)
- 2021: Boot (Mädness feat. Mine)
- 2021: Gabi & Klaus (feat. Die Prinzen)
- 2021: Was will die Welt (Henri Jakobs feat. Mine)
- 2022: Bitter (Haller feat. Mine)
- 2022: Blumen V Zucker ins Blut (Panda Lux feat. Mine)
- 2025: Implosion (AB Syndrom feat. Mine)

=== Music videos ===
- 2013: Du scheinst
- 2013: Hinterher
- 2013: Der Mond lacht
- 2014: Ziehst Du mit (feat. curlyman)
- 2014: Ziehst Du mit (feat. Textor)
- 2014: Ziehst Du mit (feat. FlowinImmO)
- 2014: Ziehst Du mit (feat. Fatoni)
- 2016: Katzen
- 2016: Rot
- 2016: Essig auf Zucker
- 2017: Keinen Tag tauschen (Musik by Dexter, starring Mine)
- 2017: Alle Liebe nachträglich (with Fatoni)
- 2017: Romcom (with Fatoni)
- 2018: Spiegelbild (with AB Syndrom)
- 2019: Klebstoff
- 2019: 90 Grad
- 2019: Einfach so
- 2021: Unfall
- 2021: Elefant
- 2021: Hinüber (feat. Sophie Hunger)
- 2023: Ich weiß es nicht
- 2023: Nichts ist umsonst
- 2024: Danke Gut (feat. Mauli)

== Awards ==
- Deutscher Musikautorenpreis
  - 2021: in the category Text Chanson/Lied
- Polyton
  - 2024: in the category Digital (Sweet Instruments)
- Preis für Popkultur
  - 2016: in the category favourite female solo performer
  - 2021: in the category favourite female solo performer (Hinüber)
  - 2021: in the category favourite video (Hinüber; with Sophie Hunger)
