= Danger Dan =

German rapper

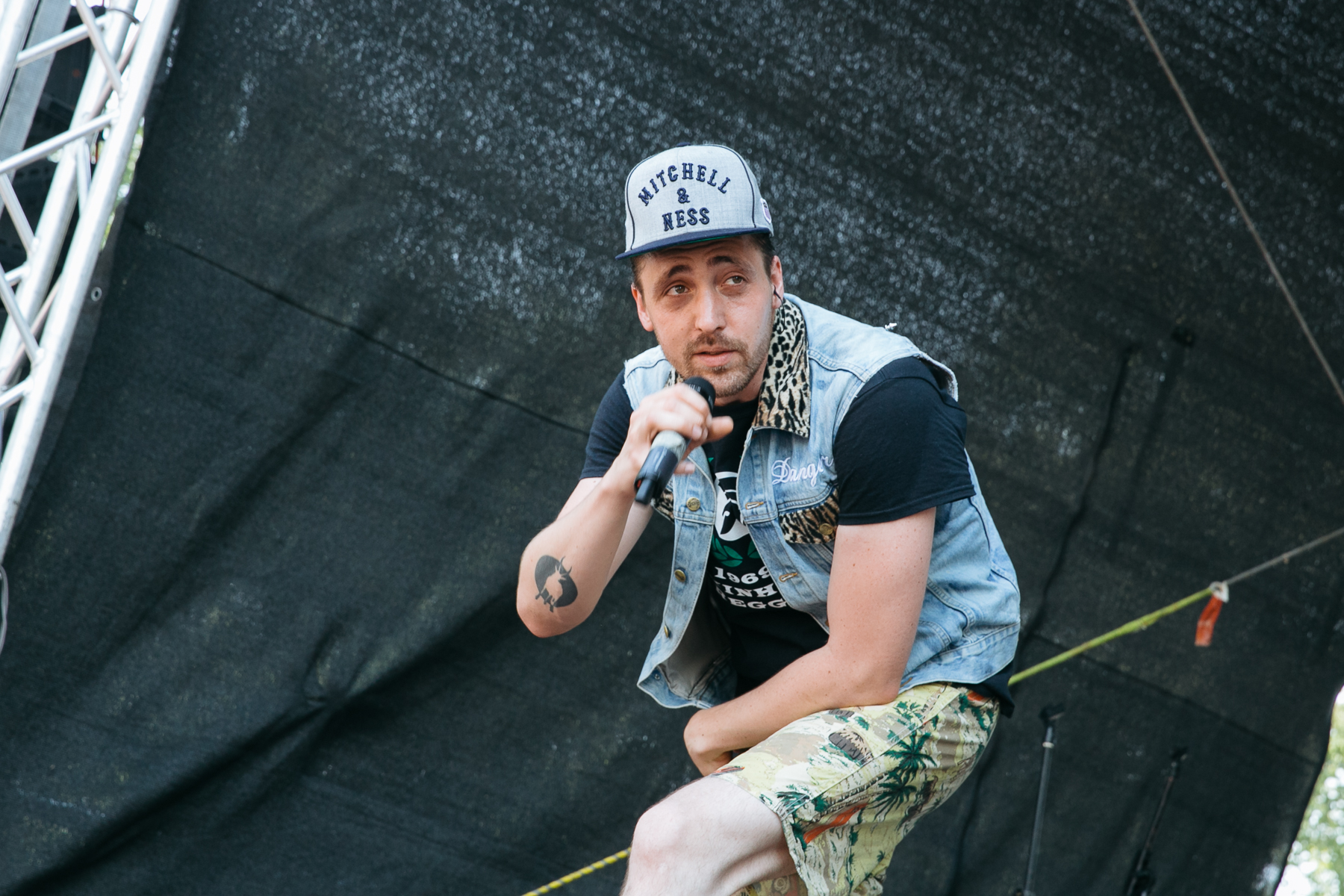
Danger Dan (2015)

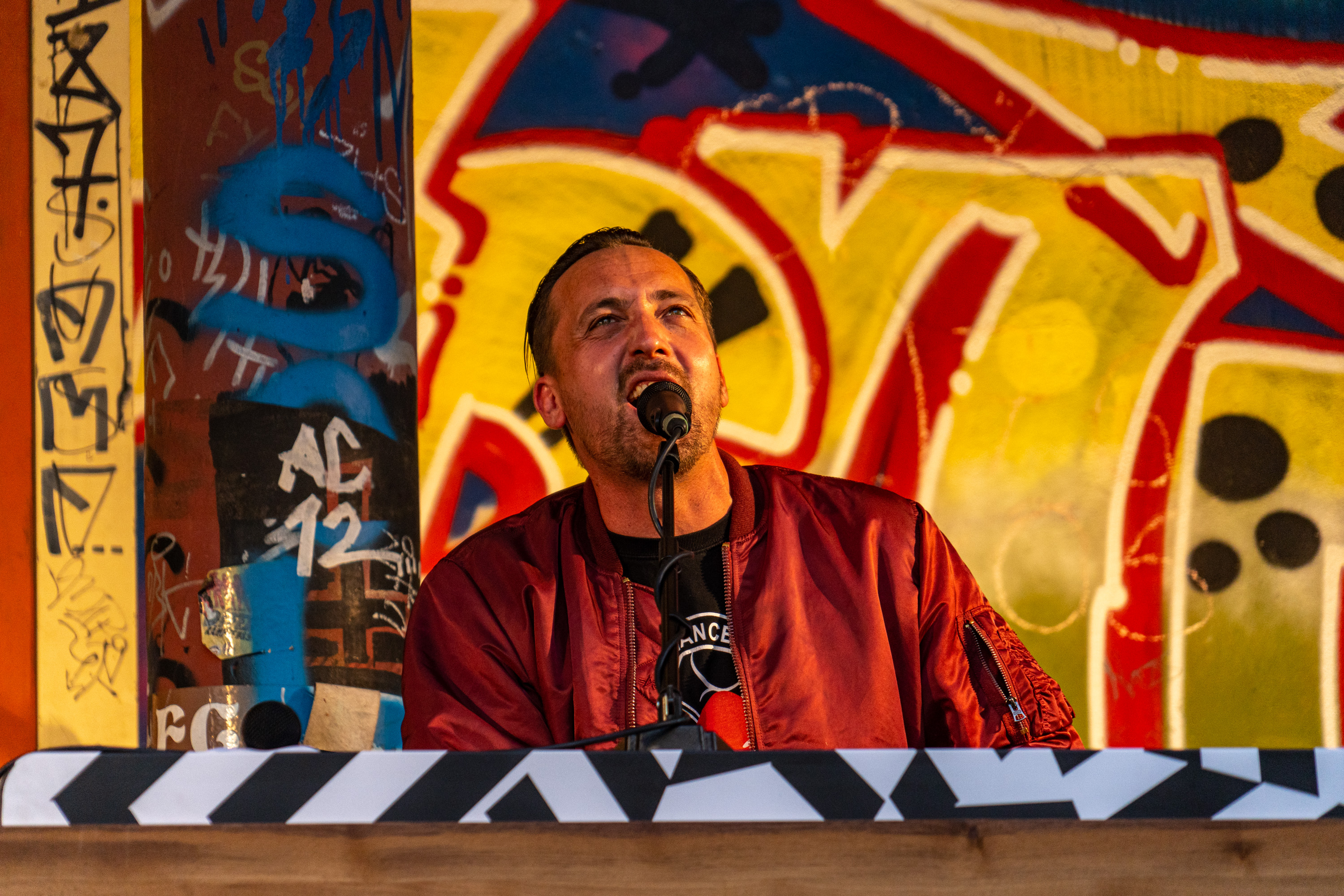
Danger Dan, 2023

Daniel Pongratz, known professionally as Danger Dan (born June 1, 1983 in Aachen) is a German musician. He is active both as a soloist and as a member of the Hip hop band Antilopen Gang.

== Life and work ==
Daniel Pongratz grew up as one of four sons of Ludwig A. Pongratz in Aachen. His parents came from the left-wing scene, and his father later became a professor of education at the Darmstadt University of Technology. They encouraged his musical talent early on, as did his younger brother Tobias. Daniel Pongratz played in various punk bands early on, but also as a pianist in a funk band, whereas his brother discovered a taste for hip-hop and introduced him to it.

In Munich in 2001, he demonstrated against the Security Conference, where he was arrested and spent twelve hours in prison.

He briefly attended the Viktoria-Gymnasium Aachen, to which he dedicated the very critical song "Ingloria Victoria" on his album Das ist alles von der Kunstfreiheit gedeckt (This is all covered by artistic freedom). Although he left school without an Abitur, he passed an entrance examination to be accepted to study Music therapy at Maastricht University in the Netherlands. There he met Sebastian Sturm and became part of the Reggae band Jin Jin from Aachen. He then dropped out of his studies to work as a professional musician. He also worked as a music teacher at a Hauptschule. Along with Sebastian Sturm he recorded the two albums This Change Is Nice (2006) and One Moment in Peace (2010). Sebastian Sturm, Moses Christoph and Pongratz founded the Cheer Up Trio together and toured the United States and Europe, among other places. The trio stayed together until around 2012.

Daniel Pongratz remained true to hip-hop. Together with his brother Tobias (Panik Panzer) and Koljah, he founded the gangsta-rap satire project Caught in the Crack in 2005, which released two internet albums in 2005 and 2008. There he called himself Dan Juan de Marcos, and as a rapper he took on the pseudonym Danger Dan, which he had already used as a reggae musician. The hip-hop collective Anti-Alles-Aktion (Anti-Everything-Action) was created at the same time. This project eventually became the Antilopen Gang together with Panik Panzer, Koljah and NMZS.

In 2008, the EP Coming out was released as his solo debut. On the album, he deals with Antisemitism and the holocaust, among other things. According to the Jüdische Allgemeine, the song Sommerlüge (Summer Lie) was the first examination of the holocaust and anti-Semitism in German rap. Beyond his solo music career, he devoted himself to various music and theater projects; among other things, he was active in 17 different countries on behalf of the Goethe-Institut and organized radio projects, concerts and theater performances for them. In 2012, his second EP Dinkelbrot & Ölsardinen (Spelt Bread & Oil Sardines) and the collaboration album Aschenbecher (Ashtray) with NMZS were released.

Subsequently, the Antilopen Gang became more successful, and Danger Dan focused on this project, consisting of him, his brother and Koljah, after the suicide of NMZS. On June 1, 2018, his 35th birthday, his first solo album Reflexionen aus dem beschönigten Leben (Reflections from the glorified life) was released on Jochen's kleine Plattenfirma (Jochen's small record company). It reached number 20 in the GfK Entertainment charts.

On March 26, 2021, he released the single Das ist alles von der Kunstfreiheit gedeckt, in which he discusses the limits of artistic freedom through criticism of Jürgen Elsässer, Götz Kubitschek, Alexander Gauland and Ken Jebsen, initially in the subjunctive mood, but changing to direct criticism in the final verse. The song entered the German singles charts on April 2, 2021 at number 69 and was released on the band's own label Antilopen Geldwäsche (Antelope Money Laundering). Within the first two weeks after its release, the music video was viewed 1.3 million times on YouTube. On April 9, 2021, Pongratz, accompanied on the piano by pianist Igor Levit, presented the song on the television show ZDF Magazin Royale. As of June 2024, the original video and the television recording had more than 21 million views.

In December 2021, Danger Dan was the first artist ever to simultaneously occupy places 1 to 3 in the Radioeins annual charts (with the songs Das ist alles von der Kunstfreiheit gedeckt [This is all covered by artistic freedom], Lauf davon [Run Away] and Eine gute Nachricht [Good News]). On July 17, 2026, Danger Dan released the song Keine Angst on all digital platforms. He and Igor Levit were initially invited to perform the song during the airing of German satire show "Die Anstalt" but were denied from entering the ZDF studios on the day the show was set to be recorded. According to the broadcasting station ZDF the song was criticized as "incitement for violence". The music video of Keine Angst reached number one spot at YouTube Trends for music in Germany upon its release.

== Awards ==
- 2021: VIA-VUT Indie Award in the category Best Act (and Best New Music Business for the label Antilopen Geldwäsche).
- 2021: Preis für Popkultur in the categories "Favorite Song" (Das ist alles von der Kunstfreiheit gedeckt), Favorite Album (Das ist alles von der Kunstfreiheit gedeckt) and Favorite Solo Artist.
- 2021: Listen To Berlin Award in the category Most Creative Music Video (Das ist alles von der Kunstfreiheit gedeckt).
- 2021: Positions 1–3 in the listener charts of the year 2021 of the radio station radioeins for the songs Das ist alles von der Kunstfreiheit gedeckt, Eine gute Nachricht and Lauf davon
- 2023: Deutscher Kleinkunstpreis in the music category.

== Discography ==
Solo albums

- 2008: Coming out (EP, Download, Self-production)
- 2012: Dinkelbrot & Ölsardinen (EP, Download/CD-r, Self-production)
- 2018: Reflexionen aus dem beschönigten Leben (Jochens kleine Plattenfirma)
- 2021: Das ist alles von der Kunstfreiheit gedeckt (Warner Music)
- 2023: Das ist alles von der Kunstfreiheit gedeckt (Live) (Antilopen Geldwäsche)
- 2026: Keine Angst (Ölsardinenindustrie)

Singles (Selection)

- 2021: Das ist alles von der Kunstfreiheit gedeckt
- 2021: Eine gute Nachricht (#1 of the German Single-Trend-Charts on April 30, 2021)
- 2021: Mir kann nichts passieren (Nothing Can Happen to Me) (with Max Herre; #1 of the German Single-Trend-Charts on October 22, 2021)
- 2026: Keine Angst

Collaboration albums

- 2010: Traurige Clowns (Sad Clowns) (with Koljah, Self-production, Download)
- 2012: Aschenbecher (with NMZS, Download/CD-r, Self-production)

With Sebastian Sturm

- 2006: This Change Is Nice (Piano)
- 2008: One Moment in Peace (Piano)

With Antilopen Gang

With Caught in the Crack

- 2005: Alles vorbei (All Over) (Self-production)
- 2008: Es wird wie ein Unfall aussehen (It Will Look Like an Accident) (Self-production, Download)

Guest contributions (without Antilopen Gang)

- 2017: Aua on Alle Liebe nachträglich by Fatoni and Mine
- 2018: Shitstorm on ICH by Moop Mama
- 2018: Propaganda on Shibuya Crossing by Juse Ju
- 2022: Unsere Bank (Our Bank) on Zorn & Liebe (Rage & Love) by Provinz (#7 of the German Single-Trend-Charts on September 9, 2022)
- 2023: Danke dass du mich verlassen hast by Fatoni
