= Oktober in Europa =

2024 song by Antilopen Gang

"Oktober in Europa" is a song by the band Antilopen Gang, which was published 5 April 2024. It discusses the 7 October attacks and antisemitism in Europe following the attack.

== Background ==
The text was written in response to the attack by Hamas on Israel on 7 October 2023, when armed fighters entered Israeli territory. Approximately 1,200 people were killed on the Israeli side, most of whom were civilians. In addition, gender-based violence against women was allegedly committed. The band said that the song "practically wrote itself" after they noticed that many artists - who in their view - are usually quick to take a stand have, remained silent.

== Style and content ==
The song consists of three parts of 16 lines each, with the verses divided between Koljah, Panik Panzer, and Danger Dan. The hook features the song title "Oktober in Europa" being sung in a pitched manner. The subtle, dark string arrangement by Coen Strouken and the piano accompaniment remains in the background. The rhythm is slow. On the album version, Sophie Hunger sings the hook. It is preceded by a "Es tut mir leid" ("I'm sorry").

In the first verse, Koljah addresses Jewish fear in Europe and refers to Sonnenallee and the Champs Élysées, where the lyrical you is afraid to show themselves publicly as a Jew. The antisemitic tendencies that Greta Thunberg has been accused of in connection with the Middle East conflict are also addressed. Olaf Scholz is also mentioned, who appears very dismayed, but nevertheless then drinks tea with the murderers. This likely alludes to his meeting with Tamim bin Hamad Al Thani, the Emir of Qatar, who is considered one of the main supporters of Hamas.

In the second verse, Panik Panzer describes fear, such as reports from German cities that Stolpersteine are no longer cleaned and Jewish design features are being removed. Hamas propaganda via graffiti and a short-term TikTok trend about a 20-year-old letter from Osama bin Laden in November 2023 are also mentioned in the text.

Danger Dan then takes over the last part, an angry accusation against the left-wing scene, which he accuses of trivializing hatred of Jews and spreading Hamas propaganda under the shield of criticism of Israel. In addition to his own experiences at the Rote Flora, the international perspective is also taken up. The elite University of California, Berkeley, where Judith Butler is a professor and alleged antisemitic attacks have occurred, is mentioned.

== Publication ==
The song was released on 5 April 2024. It is the first pre-release of the album, Alles muss repariert werden, the seventh album by Antilopen Gang, released on 13 September 2024. The accompanying video appeared on YouTube and contains only the black text of the song on a white background. The comment function is deactivated. A short text was added, which addresses the creation of the song and the powerlessness of the three rappers in the face of increasing antisemitism after 7 October 2023.

== Reception ==
The song received positive reception, with those by the Axel Springer publishing house's media being particularly surprising. Welt's "chief reporter for freedom" Anna Schneider and WeltN24's editor-in-chief Ulf Poschardt praised the song on X, and Bild devoted a text analysis to the song and praised it as an exposure of left-wing double standards and as "a true and important statement against antisemitism." The band itself has not commented on the unusual support or on the criticism of said support, such as that presented by K.I.Z.

Despite the critical comments about the chancellor, Wolfgang Schmidt, head of the Federal Chancellery, also shared the song on Twitter and wrote: "Great song by the Antilopen Gang for October 7th and the mood in Germany". However, the statements in the video were not commented on. The Jüdische Allgemeine particularly praised the Antilopen Gang for being "among the very few artists who expressed solidarity at all. Now, with their verses, they have brought the reality of life for Jews in Europe back into consciousness."

Criticism was directed towards parts of the song: the line "Greta hates Jews too" was criticized for watering down the concept of antisemitism. The line "Civilians in Gaza are a shield for Hamas/a shield for the descendants of those who gassed Jews" was also viewed critically; the line is open to interpretation. Among other things, the band itself has been accused of lacking empathy. Lea Fauth accused the band in the Taz of relativizing the Holocaust in this way. The band itself later commented, explaining that the lyrics referred to the German left using Hamas civilians as a human shield. They state that the lyrics should not be understood as an anti-Palestine song, but as one critical of the reversion of blame.

Some critics felt that the text contained falsehoods: for example, the Rote Flora in Hamburg, which Danger Dan had mentioned negatively, had already taken a stand against Hamas days after the attack. The left-wing, socialist magazine Jacobin also commented negatively, believing that it recognized polemics and provocation in the text.

In an interview published in Der Spiegel four months after the song was released, the band expressed delight that the song had reached many people and received a lot of support, especially from the Jewish community. They described it as putting the "shitstorm" they had received on Twitter into perspective.

== See also ==
- Oktober in Europa on YouTube
