= StillNo1 =

Studio album by Slut
- Released: (Germany) January 25, 2008
- Recorded: 2007, Berlin
- Genre: Alternative rock Indie rock
- Length: 44:20
- Label: Virgin Germany

Slut chronology
Songs aus Die Dreigroschenoper (2006)	StillNo1 (2008)

StillNo1 is the seventh album by German indie rock band Slut. It was released on January 25, 2008.

== Production ==
The band recorded the album in Berlin in 2007. It was their first "real" studio album after recording and releasing a number of songs from Bertolt Brecht's and Kurt Weill's The Threepenny Opera in 2006. The band described recording those songs as essential for the existence of StillNo1 as they incorporated many things they learned during their time performing at theaters.

== Cover art ==
The cover of the album is a version of a painting by Berlin artist Sigurd Wendland. The band planned to find a cover art by visiting art galleries in Berlin Mitte while recording the album but found nothing there that they liked. They discovered Wendland's art by browsing through an arts catalogue afterwards and decided that Wendland's art fits their music style. Wendland was supportive of the band and even asked them whether they would play at his vernissage at Lisbon.

Lead singer Chris Neuburger described it as great way to depict the music on StillNo1.

Some young people look at you, they seem to want something from you - but you have no idea, what it is.

— Chris Neuburger,

== Reception ==
Professional ratings
Review scores
Source	Rating
Plattentest	(9/10)
World of Music	(favorable)

German music review site "Plattentest" gave it 9 out of 10 points and praised the album's departure from the loud, screaming songs on the band's previous 2004 studio album All We Need Is Silence. The review also highlighted positively that the band diversified their usage of musical instruments, departing from their style of using mainly guitar sound which they established on Lookbook (2000) and compares the sound of the album to a variety of different artists, amongst them Radiohead, Depeche Mode, The Divine Comedy, Sigur Rós and The Beatles.

German music magazine "World of Music" also praised the album and named it their "CD of the month" in February 2008.

== Track list ==
All music is composed by Slut

No.	Title	Length
1.	"Sum It Up"	2:19
2.	"Come On"	3:39
3.	"StillNo1"	4:06
4.	"If I Had a Heart"	3:55
5.	"Wednesday"	3:28
6.	"Ariel"	4:45
7.	"Odds and Ends"	4:16
8.	"Better Living"	4:01
9.	"Failed On You"	5:33
10.	"Tomorrow Will Be Mine"	4:01
11.	"Say Yes To Everything"	6:17
12.	"Work Hard and Be Nice to People" (Saturn Special edition bonus track)	4:20
13.	"Wednesday (feat. Dillon)" (Saturn Special edition bonus track)	3:37
14.	"Time To Go Home" (Saturn Special edition bonus track)	1:45

== Lyrics ==
Unlike in previous albums, StillNo1 contains lyrics that are addressing a variety of political and sociological topics. Lead singer Chris Neuburger said in an interview that while the band previously had such thoughts, it was the first time they put them into musical form. He went on to say that the music and titles were designed to "trick" the listener into expecting lyrics that fit the music in a romantic way but instead often contain elements of criticism of the current political and sociological system.
