= Antilopen Gang =

German hip hop group

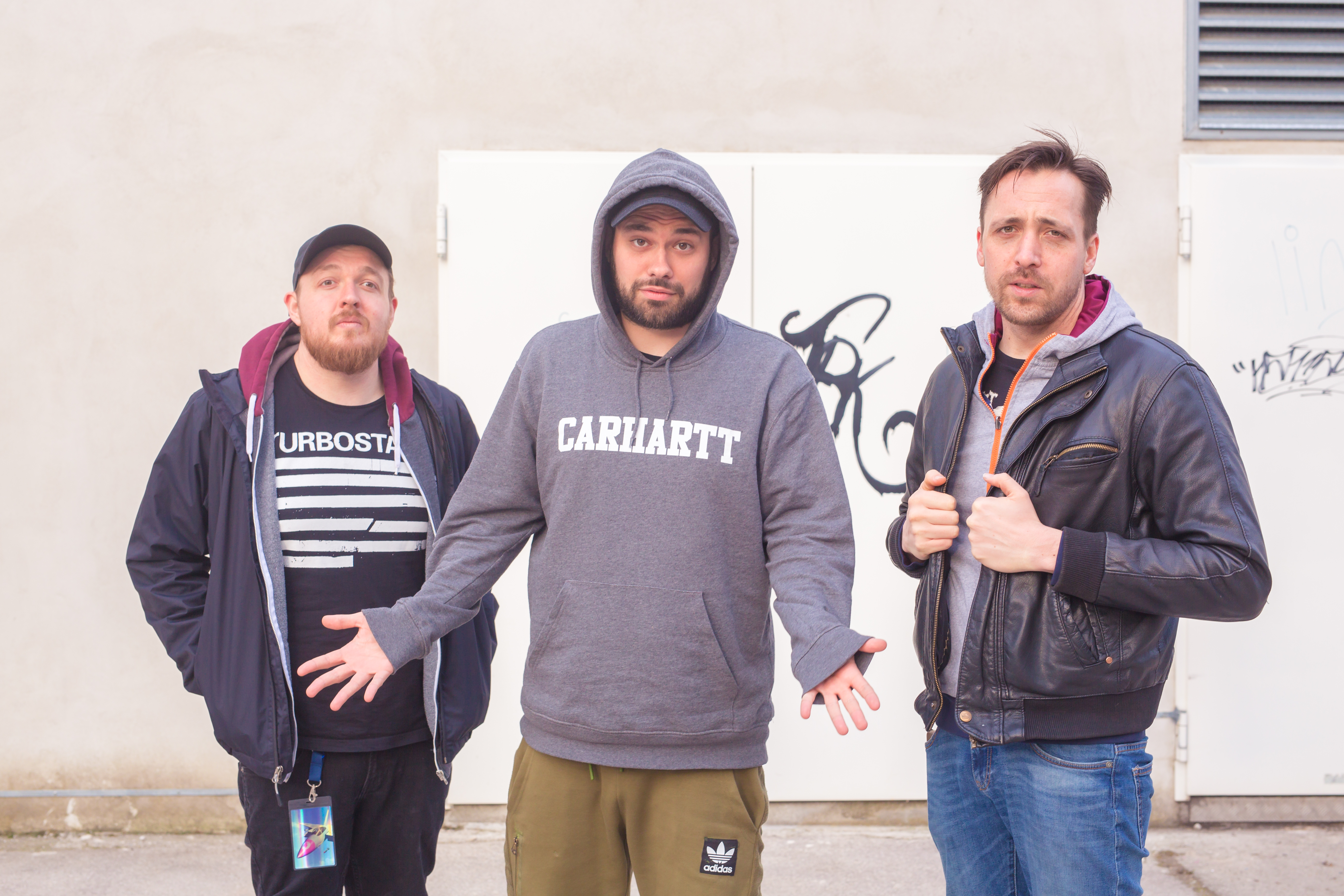
Antilopen Gang in 2017

Antilopen Gang (Antelope Gang) is a German hip hop group from Düsseldorf and Aachen. The group consists of the rappers Koljah, Panik Panzer and Danger Dan and produces music under their own label, Antilopen Geldwäsche. Another member of the group, NMZS (Jakob Wich), committed suicide in 2013.

== History ==
Under the name Caught in the Crack, the musicians that later formed Antilopen Gang published parodistic gangsta rap albums in 2005 and 2008.

Antilopen Gang was founded in 2009 by the rappers Danger Dan, Koljah, NMZS and Panik Panzer. In interviews about the band's name the rappers have given several ironic answers, such as having an inspiring dinner at a restaurant that contained antilope meat as well as personal experiences as boy scouts.

Their first album Spastik Desaster was released at the turn of the year 2009/2010 as a free download, and the group gained national popularity through the song Fick die Uni (fuck university), which was followed by solo albums by several members.

NMZS committed suicide in March 2013. His fellow group members posthumously released his solo album Der Ekelhafte (the disgusting one).

In 2014, Antilopen Gang signed a contract with the label JKP of the popular German punk band Die Toten Hosen. In October 2014 the Single Beate Zschäpe hört U2 (Beate Zschäpe is listening to U2) was released, criticizing the phenomenon of right-wing extremism in Germany.

=== Aversion (2014) ===
On November 7, 2014, the album Aversion was released under the JKP label, and was dedicated to NMZS.

In 2015 the Band won the New Music Award as well as the VIA Award in the category "Best Newcomer" and was awarded with the political Amadeu Antonio Award. In 2015 the band recorded a song for the satirical party Partei für Arbeit, Rechtsstaat, Tierschutz, Elitenförderung und basisdemokratische Initiative (Die PARTEI) together with artists Bela B and Slime.

=== Anarchie und Alltag (2017) ===
In January 2017 the band announced that in addition to their new album Anarchie und Alltag (Anarchy and Everyday Life) a bonus album Atombombe auf Deutschland (Atom Bomb on Germany) would be released.

Anarchie und Alltag was released on January 20, immediately topping the German charts.

=== Abbruch Abbruch and Adrenochrom (2020) ===
Their fourth studio album Abbruch Abbruch (abort abort) was released on January 24, 2020. On August 21 of the same year, without prior announcements, the band released the fifth studio album Adrenochrom (adrenochrome) which was written during the COVID-19 lockdown. It was also the first record being released by their own record label Antilopen Geldwäsche (antelope money laundering).

=== Antilopen Geldwäsche Sampler 1 (2021) ===
On Christmas Eve 2021 the Antilopen Geldwäsche Sampler 1 was released following the single of the same name. It also contains a lot of featured guests including Max Herre, Fatoni, Zugezogen Maskulin and Bobby Fletcher.

The planned Aufbruch Aufbruch Tour (Aufbruch meaning departure, in German resembling the title of the 2020 album Abbruch Abbruch) had to be postponed until 2022 due to the restrictions of the COVID-19 pandemic.

=== Oktober in Europa (2024) ===
On April 5, 2024, the song Oktober in Europa was published as a statement against antisemitism, making Antilopen Gang one of the few German bands openly speaking out in solidarity with the victims of the October 7 attack. It has been criticized for shifting the blame for antisemitism to Muslims in Germany and been celebrated by the Anti-Deutsche movement.

=== Alles muss repariert werden (2024) ===
The latest album Alles muss repariert werden was published on September 13, 2024, consisting of a Hip-Hop and a Punk record.

== Discography ==
=== As Antilopen Gang ===
==== Albums ====
- 2014: Aversion
- 2015: Abwasser
- 2017: Anarchie und Alltag
- 2020: Abbruch Abbruch
- 2020: Adrenochrom
- 2021: Antilopen Geldwäsche Sampler 1
- 2024: Alles muss repariert werden

==== Singles and videos ====
- 2010: Traurige Clowns (Koljah & Danger Dan)
- 2011: Motto Mobbing (Koljah & NMZS)
- 2011: Kommentarfeld (Koljah & NMZS)
- 2011: Egotrip (NMZS)
- 2011: Viel zu viel (NMZS)
- 2012: Ölsardinenindustrie (Danger Dan)
- 2012: Kontaktanzeige (NMZS & Danger Dan)
- 2012: So ungefähr (NMZS & Danger Dan)
- 2012: Lebensmotto Tarnkappe (NMZS & Danger Dan)
- 2012: Der Promomove (NMZS)
- 2013: Chabos wissen wer die Uni fickt (Live)
- 2013: Intro (Der Ekelhafte) (NMZS)
- 2013: Sarkophag (NMZS)
- 2014: Vorurteile Pt. II (Fatoni feat. Antilopen Gang & Juse Ju)
- 2014: Der goldene Presslufthammer
- 2014: Outlaws
- 2014: Beate Zschäpe hört U2 (Single, JKP)
- 2015: Verliebt
- 2015: Enkeltrick
- 2016: Das Trojanische Pferd
- 2017: Pizza
- 2017: Patientenkollektiv
- 2017: Liebe Grüße (feat. (Fatoni)
- 2017: Baggersee
- 2019: 2013 (prod. by C.O.W. 牛)
- 2019: Wünsch Dir Nix (prod. by C.O.W. 牛)
- 2019: Lied gegen Kiffer
- 2020: Der Ruf ist ruiniert (prod. by C.O.W. 牛)
- 2020: Bang Bang
- 2020: Trenn dich
- 2020: Army Parka
- 2021: Antilopen Geldwäsche
- 2024: Oktober in Europa
- 2024: Muttertag
- 2024: Sympathie für meine Hater
- 2024: Oberbürgermeister
- 2024: Für wenige
- 2024: Der Romantische Mann (Panik Panzer-Solotrack)
- 2024: Weg von hier (Koljah-Solotrack)
- 2024: American Fitness am Hermannplatz (Danger Dan-Solotrack)

==== Free tracks ====
- 2013: Niemand peilt die Gang (MeinRap.de exclusive)
- 2013: Leben und Streben des Friedrich Kautz
- 2014: Vorurteile Pt. II (feat. Fatoni & Juse Ju)
- 2020: Kleine miese Type

=== Solo releases ===
==== Before the foundation of Antilopen Gang ====
- 2007: Panik & Koljah: Mut zur Blamage (EP, CD)
- 2007: NMZS: Trash (EP, free download)
- 2008: Koljah, NMZS & Tai Phun: L’avantgarde – Gute Sprüche 05-07 (CD)
- 2008: Danger Dan: Coming Out (EP, free download)
- 2008: NMZS & SZMN: Robopommes (EP, free download)

==== After the foundation of Antilopen Gang ====
- 2009: Panik, Koljah & NMZS: Spastik Desaster (CD & free download)
- 2010: Koljah & Danger Dan: Traurige Clowns (EP, free download)
- 2010: Koljah, NMZS & Pitlab: L’avantgarde – das Remixtape (free download)
- 2010: Koljah: Publikumsbeschimpfung (CD & free download)
- 2011: NMZS & Koljah: Motto Mobbing (CD & free download)
- 2011: NMZS: Egotrip (EP, free download)
- 2012: Danger Dan: Dinkelbrot und Ölsardinen (EP, CD & free download)
- 2012: NMZS & Danger Dan: Aschenbecher (CD & free download)
- 2013: NMZS: Der Ekelhafte (CD & free download)
- 2014: Koljah, Panik & Danger Dan: Aversion (CD & download)
- 2015: Koljah, Panik & Danger Dan: Abwasser (free download)
- 2017: Koljah, Panik Panzer & Danger Dan: Anarchie & Alltag + Bonus Album "Atombombe auf Deutschland" (CD & download)
- 2018: Danger Dan: Reflexionen aus dem beschönigten Leben (CD, Vinyl & Download)
- 2019: Koljah: Aber der Abgrund (Vinyl & Download)
- 2021: Danger Dan: Das ist alles von der Kunstfreiheit gedeckt (CD, Vinyl & Download)
- 2022: Koljah & Bobby Fletcher: Vielleicht ist es besser so

=== As Caught in the Crack ===
- 2005: Alles Vorbei
- 2008: Es wird wie ein Unfall aussehen (free download)
