= Gods of Blitz =

German rock band

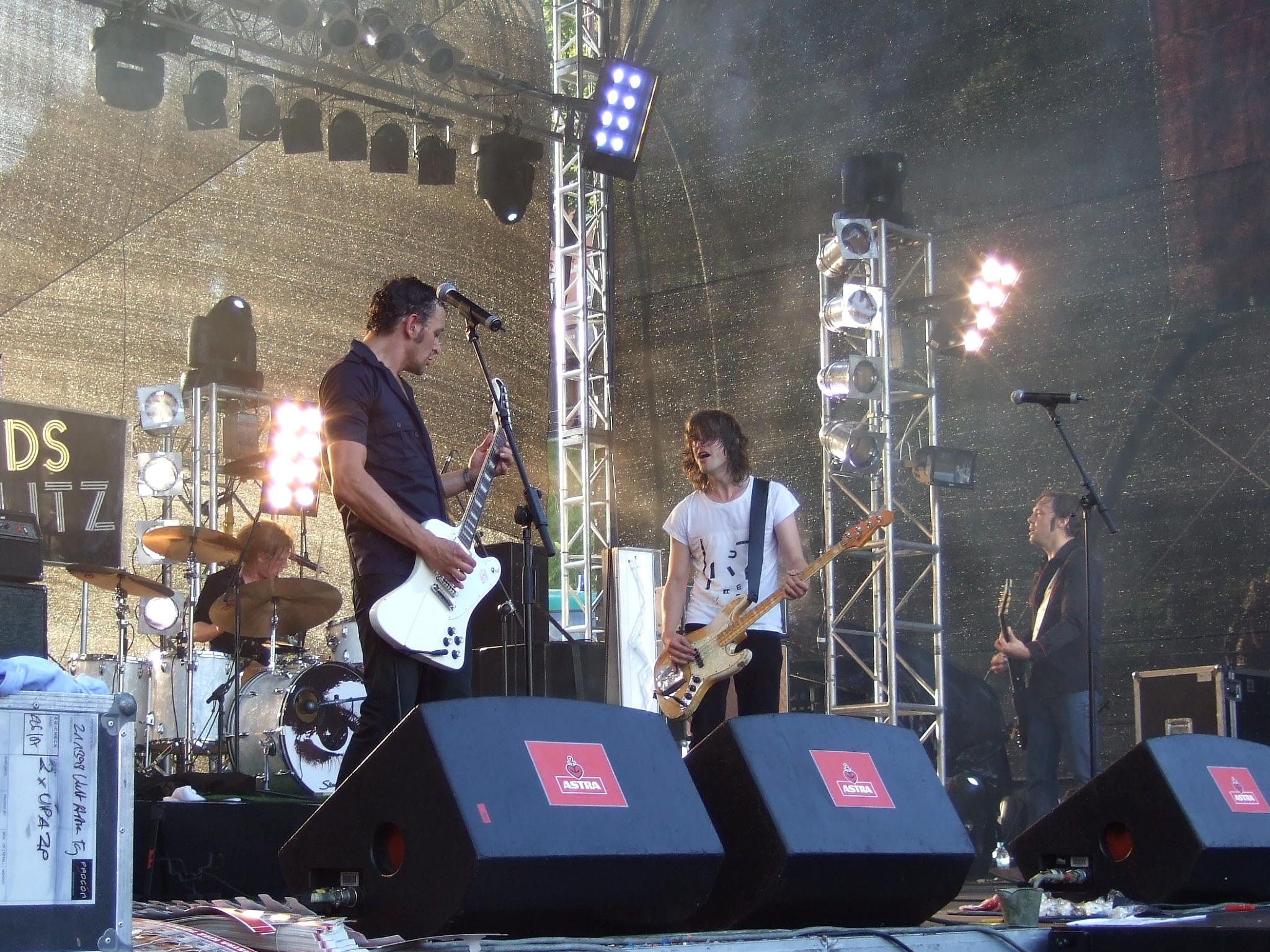
- Gods of Blitz, 28.07.07 in Hamburg

Background information
- Origin: Berlin, Germany
- Genres: Rock; Indie rock Garage rock
- Years active: 2004–present
- Label: Four Music/Sony BMG
- Members: Sebastian Gäbel; Olli Wong; Jens Giovanni Freudenberg; Jakob Kiersch

Gods of Blitz is a rock band founded in Berlin. They performed a pop-friendly style of Garage rock, with strong punk and proto-punk influences.

== History ==
Gods of Blitz was founded by Berlin-based musicians Sebastian Gäbel (vocals & bass), Olli Wong (guitar), Jens Freudenberg (guitar), and Jakob Kiersch (drums). Their debut album, Stolen Horse, has garnered praise throughout German media, as well as assorted Australian music magazines (after opening for Wolfmother), including Rolling Stone. With production from Torsten Otto and Gordon Raphael (The Strokes, Wildhearts) and mixing by Michael Ilbert (The Hives, The Cardigans, Hellacopters), the band delivered a sound familiar to the American and British indie scene dominating radio and music television at the time.

Gods of Blitz also supported Maxïmo Park and Nick Oliveri (ex-member of Queens of the Stone Age) during the Stolen Horse tour. In 2007 the band released their second album Reporting a Mirage and toured extensively to support the album. Singer Sebastian Gäbel left the band in 2008. The remaining members recruited singer Nico Kozik as replacement, released a third album Under the Radar in 2009 before disbanding later the same year. In 2012 the original line-up reunited for a series of concerts at the live venue Lido, Berlin. On August 24, 2020, singer Sebastian announced on the band's Instagram profile that a new single Cactus Complex will be released August 28th, 2020.

== Discography ==
=== Singles ===
- 2005 "Gods of Blitz" (EP)
- 2005 "Greetings from Flashbackville"
- 2006 "The Rising"
- 2007 "New Wave Wipe-Out"
- 2020 "Cactus Complex"

=== Album ===
- 2005 "Stolen Horse"
- 2007 "Reporting a Mirage"
- 2009 "Under the Radar" (different personnel)
