= Kytes =

German indie pop band

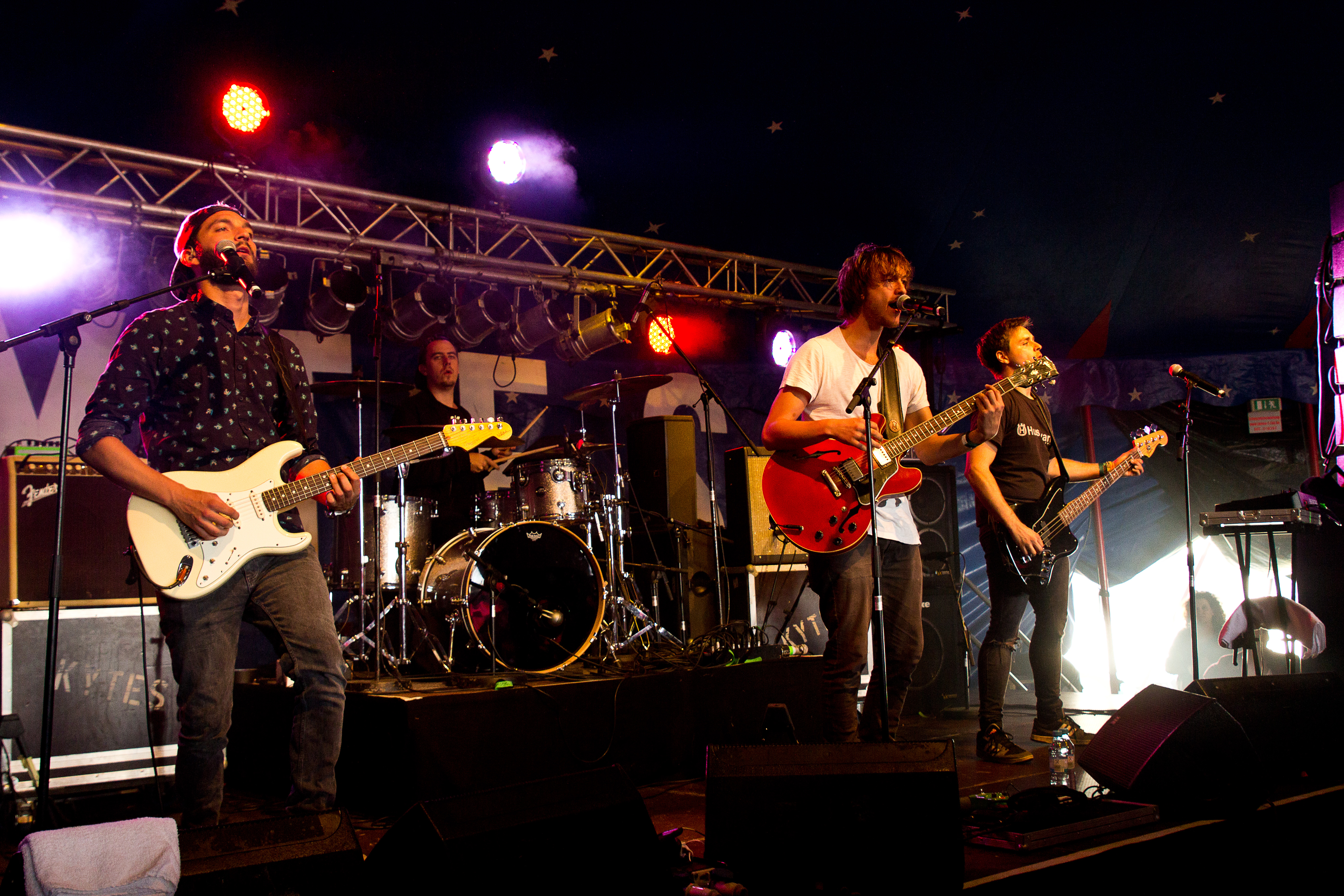
- Kytes performing in 2016

Background information
- Origin: Munich, Germany
- Genres: Indie pop; electropop
- Years active: 2015–present
- Labels: Lichtdicht Records; Filter Music; Frisbee Records
- Spinoff of: Blind Freddy
- Members: Michael Spieler; Timothy Lush; Kerim Öke
- Past members: Thomas Kirchner
- Website: www.kytesmusic.com

Kytes, stylised uppercase as KYTES, is a German indie pop band from Bavaria and formed in Munich out of Blind Freddy in 2015, currently consisting of members Michael Spieler, Timothy Lush, and Kerim Öke. They have released three albums: Heads and Tales (2016), Good Luck (2020), and To Feel Something At All (2023).

== Members ==
- Michael Spieler, vocals and electric guitar
- Timothy Lush, drums
- Kerim Öke, guitar and keyboard
- Thomas Kirchner / Sedlacek, electric bass and synthesizer (former)

== Career ==
The band's founding four members Michael Spieler, Timothy Lush, Kerim Öke, and Thomas Kirchner (also known as Thomas Sedlacek) began playing together in 2009 as members of a school band called Blind Freddy, which they considered an experimental hobby and a "practice phase" at the time, through which they learned to write music and went on tour. In 2015, they rebranded and renamed themselves Kytes, releasing the singles "Inner Cinema", which was awarded Song of the Year by the University of Canberra out of 230 entries and named a Puls track of the week, and "On the Run", the music video for which was filmed in Brighton, ahead of their debut EP, also titled On the Run, that November via Lichtdicht Records. They also signed with Deckstar Artist Management for their U.S. representation. These singles ended up on Kytes' debut album Heads and Tales, released in 2016 via Sony's Filter Music. That year, the band won the New Music Award, awarded by German radio stations.

The band founded their own record label in 2018 called Frisbee Records, through which they released the EP Frisbee in 2019 and their sophomore album Good Luck in 2020. The album's singles included "Go Out" and "Runaway". Kytes also became sponsors of the Fürstenfeldbruck vocational school. In 2021, they released the singles "the beat is on hold" and "bumblin". That July, they returned to live performances.

Kytes' next EP Apricosa followed in July 2022, accompanied by the titular single as well as "Happy Hangover". They supported Alt-J on tour that November.

In 2023, Kytes released their third album To Say Nothing At All alongside the single "Deep Dive" and went on a headline tour in Germany. Kirchner exited the band at the end of that year. Kytes embarked on headline dates in 2023 and 2024, and supported the English indie rock band King No-One on their UK tour.

== Artistry ==
Kytes set out to be a "European band with an international sound". Lush is half-Australian and, as of 2015, provided the band's English lyrics. Drawing from 80s synthpop, indie, and disco, Kytes' music has often been described as "peppy". The band have cited The Police, INXS, Parcels, Jungle, Two Door Cinema Club, Phoenix, Foals, and Tame Impala as influences, as well as The Strokes, Jamie XX, Flume, and Major Lazer. In his review of their March 2024 Nottingham supporting gig, Karl Blakesley of LeftLion compared the band's "utterly infectious" sound to that of Foals, Friendly Fires, The Wombats, and Daft Punk.

== Discography ==
=== Albums ===
- Heads and Tales (2016)
- Good Luck (2020)
- To Feel Something At All (2023)

=== EPs ===
- On the Run (2015)
- Frisbee (2019)
- Apricosa (2022)

=== Singles ===
Year	Song	Album
2015	"Inner Cinema"	On the Run / Heads and Tales
2015	"On the Run"	On the Run / Heads and Tales
2016	"I Got Something"	Heads and Tales
2016	"As We Row"	Heads and Tales
2018	"Remedy"	Frisbee
2018	"Take It Easy"	Frisbee
2019	"Alright"	Good Luck
2019	"Want You Back"	Good Luck
2020	"Go Out"	Good Luck
2020	"Runaway"	Good Luck
2021	"the beat is on hold"	Non-album singles
2021	"bumblin"	Non-album singles
2021	"hello (and it's christmas)"	Non-album singles
2022	"Apricosa"	Apricosa
2022	"Rollercoaster"	Apricosa
2022	"Happy Hangover"	Apricosa
2022	"Hula-Hoop"	Apricosa
2022	"Mister Burns"	To Feel Something At All
2023	"Deep Dive"	To Feel Something At All
