= Edgar Wasser =

German rapper from Munich (born 1990)

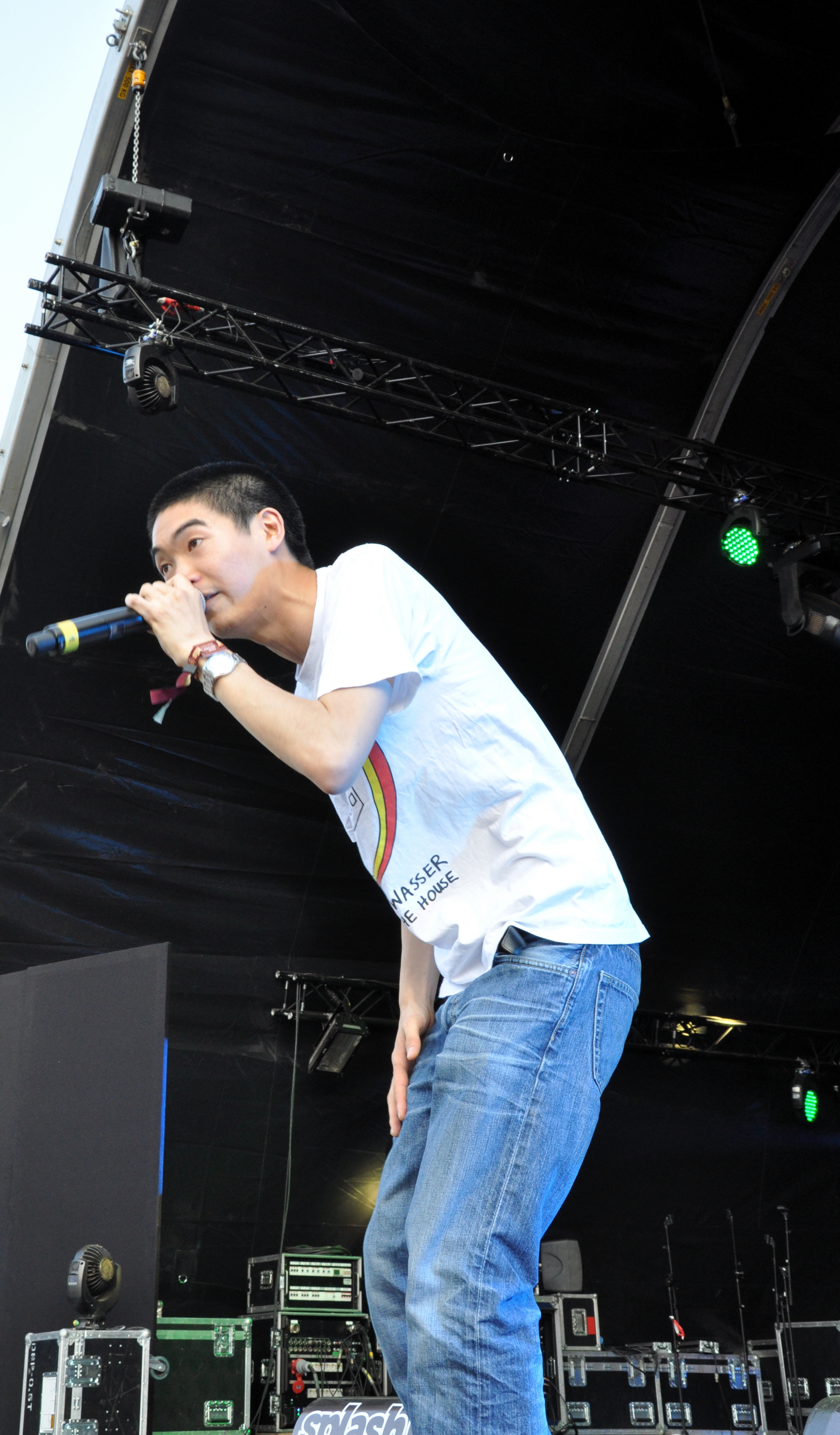
- Edgar Wasser at the Splash! Festival, 2013

Background information
- Born: September 22, 1990 (age 35); Chicago, IL
- Origin: Munich
- Genres: Hip hop, Old-school hip hop
- Years active: 2007-present

Edgar Wasser (born September 22, 1990 in Chicago) is a German rapper from Munich.

== Early life ==
Edgar Wasser was born in Chicago but moved to Munich with his parents at the age of three. He completed his Abitur at a Waldorf school. He has publicly performed as a rapper since 2007 and has published a series of free EPs and mixtapes online.

== Music career ==
Blumentopf booked him as support for their tour. Wasser has released most of his music free of charge, collaborating with other members of the German rap scene, most notably Cap Kendricks. In 2013 he joined Cap Kendricks, X, Phil Harmony, Paul and DJ Mic-e to form the band Dopeboy.

After releasing the third installment of his Edgar Wasser Freetrack Collection, in 2013 he published the album Nocebo with Fatoni of Creme Fresh. Furthermore, he appeared at the 2013 Splash! Festival.

On November 14, 2014, he released his debut commercial album, the Tourette-Syndrom EP, with the German label Regenbogenpinguin. The record was distributed by Soulfood and peaked at #45 on the German album charts.

== Musical style ==
Edgar Wasser utilizes elements of old-school hip hop as well as new-wave German rap. Unlike many German rappers, Edgar Wasser puts little emphasis on image or street credibility, revealing little of his private life. His texts are influenced by Conscious Rap and stand out due to his humour, which employs cynicism, sarcasm and irony. His texts often allude to Hip-Hop-culture and various hip hop cultures, ranging from German student rap to Gangsta rap.

== Discography ==
=== Albums ===
- 2014: Tourette-Syndrom EP (Regenbogenpinguin/Soulfood)

=== Compilations ===
- 2011: The Edgar Wasser Freetrack Collection (Free Download)
- 2012: The Edgar Wasser Freetrack Collection Vol. 2 (Free Download)
- 2013: The Edgar Wasser Freetrack Collection Vol. 3 (Free Download)
- 2015: The Edgar Wasser Freetrack Collection Vol. 4 (Free Download)

=== EPs ===
- 2010: ThisFolderMayContainTheMeaningOfLife (Free Download)
- 2010: Stockholm-Syndrom EP (Free Download)
- 2011: Leuchtbuchstaben & Geisterschlösser (Free Download)
- 2012: Edgar Wasser _EP (self-produced, was available through download over his homepage)

=== Collaborative albums ===
- 2010: Es rappelt in der Kiste (self-produced, feat. Miami Weisz)
- 2012: Wir korrigieren vier Tonnen Stahl mit einer Hand (self-produced, feat. Cap Kendricks)
- 2012: Nocebo (Vinyldigital.de, feat. Fatoni)
- 2021: Delirium (Krasser Stoff, feat. Fatoni)

=== Freetracks ===
- 2011: Vdszbz (feat. Gossenboss mit Zett)
- 2011: Detektiv Edgar
- 2012: Ein Lied fürs Mile of Style (feat. Emkay, Weekend and Dobbo, Disstrack against Juliensblog, a vlogger from Germany)
- 2012: YouTube-Exclusive
- 2012: Promo oder Prostitution (MeinRap.de Exclusive)
- 2013: Dein Shirt ist nicht kugelsicher! (Disstrack against Money Boy)
- 2013: Du widerst mich an (Disstrack against Money Boy)
- 2013: Geldjunge (Disstrack against Money Boy)
- 2013: JUICE Exclusive (Juice-CD Vol. 116, Heft 151)
- 2014: Tony (SoundCloud Exclusive)
- 2014: Lost HDF
- 2014: Die Cypher (feat. Johnny Rakete, LUX, Fatoni und Marz)
- 2014: 14.11.14
- 2015: Fake it till you make it (SoundCloud)
- 2015: Alles leuchtet 2 (feat. LUX & DJ Explizit)

=== Feature-Tracks ===
- 2011: Fatoni: Jeder 10. Deutsche (Album: Solange früher alles besser war)
- 2012: LUX: Krass! (Album: Momentaufnahme)
- 2013: Weekend: Z.B. (Album: Am Wochenende Rapper)
- 2013: E-Rich: Luzifer (Album: Mehr6)
- 2013: Provo: Pretty Girlz (Album: Monaco Moll)
- 2013: Johnny Rakete & Meister Lampe: Ladidadi (Album: Broke aber dope)
- 2013: Emkay: Keller (EP: Achja?)
- 2014: Fatoni: Moin Freunde Skit und An der Uhr (Album: Die Zeit heilt alle Hypes)
- 2014: JuseJu: Übertreib nicht deine Rolle (Album: Übertreib nicht deine Rolle)
- 2014: Slowly & 12Vince: Cypheroper (Album: Ultima Radio)
- 2014: Maeckes: Olympia Puke (Album: Zwei)
- 2015: Weekend: 20 Uhr 15 (Album: Für immer Wochenende)
- 2015: Weekend: 28,29 (Album: Musik für die die nicht so gerne denken)
- 2017: Fatoni: Anders (Album: Im Modus)
- 2017: Fatoni: Echt (Album: Im Modus)
- 2017: Fatoni: DA.YO.NE (Album: Im Modus)
- 2017: Weekend: Kinder machen (Album: Keiner ist gestorben)
- 2018: Juse Ju: 7Eleven (Album: Shibuya Crossing)
- 2018: Lux: Dis is was ich mach (Album: Ikigai)
