= Christoph & Lollo =

Austrian musical comedy duo

Christoph & Lollo are a musical comedy duo from Vienna, Austria, made up of singer Christoph Drexler and guitarist Lollo Pichler.

The band became famous for their Schispringerlieder (ski jumper songs), humorous songs about ski jumpers, often depicting them as sad and miserable. Their first song Lebkuchenherz, a ballad telling the story of Frantisek Jez, was regularly aired on the Austrian radio station FM4 in 1997. In the following years the band released three albums with songs about skijumpers like Eddie "The Eagle" Edwards, Janne Ahonen and Kazuyoshi Funaki.

In 2007, they won third place at the comedy contest Passauer Kabaretttage at the Scharfrichterhaus in Passau, Germany. In 2009, their YouTube recording of "Karl-Heinz", referring to the first name of ex-minister of finance, Karl-Heinz Grasser, became quite popular on Social Media, as it named a large number of politicians and high-level managers who have been involved in major corruption scandals by their first names, asking for justice but omitting their full names.

== Discography ==
- Schispringerlieder (1999)
- Mehr Schispringerlieder (2000)
- Schispringerlieder 3 (2003)
- Trotzdemtrotz (2005)
- Hitler, Huhn und Hölle! (2007)
- Tschuldigung. (2011)
- Das ist Rock 'n' Roll (2014)
- Mitten ins Hirn (2018)
