= Heinz aus Wien =

Heinz aus Wien are a rock band from Austria. They sing in German. The band was created 1995. The band consists of Cornelius Dix (Bass), Michi Gaissmaier (vocals, guitar), Markus Gartner (guitar) and Bernd Jungmair (drums, vocals). Past members are Lelo Brossmann (guitar, vocals, 1995 – 2003) and Paul Wallner (guitar, 2003 – 2008).

They became famous with songs as: "Schlafen ohne dich" (Sleep without you), "Ich hab mit Tocotronic Bier getrunken" (I drank beer with Tocotronic) or the birthday-song for FM4 (a radio station in Austria) "Alles Gute FM4" (All the best FM4). Their second album "Elektroboot, bitte" was a solid continue of their first album "Welsfischen am Wolgadelta". The albums "Pasadena" and "Karate Karate" are intentionally more in the direction of pop than rock.

The band was nominated in 2001, 2002 and 2003 for the Amadeus Austrian Music Award.

== Discography ==
- 1996 - Welsfischen am Wolgadelta
- 1997 - Elektroboot, bitte
- 2000 - Pasadena
- 2002 - Karate Karate
- 2003 - Live in Mexico
- 2005 - It's A Crazy World
- 2006 - It's A Crazy Remix Album
- 2007 - Die bunten Fahnen gehen über die Welt
