= Bauchklang =

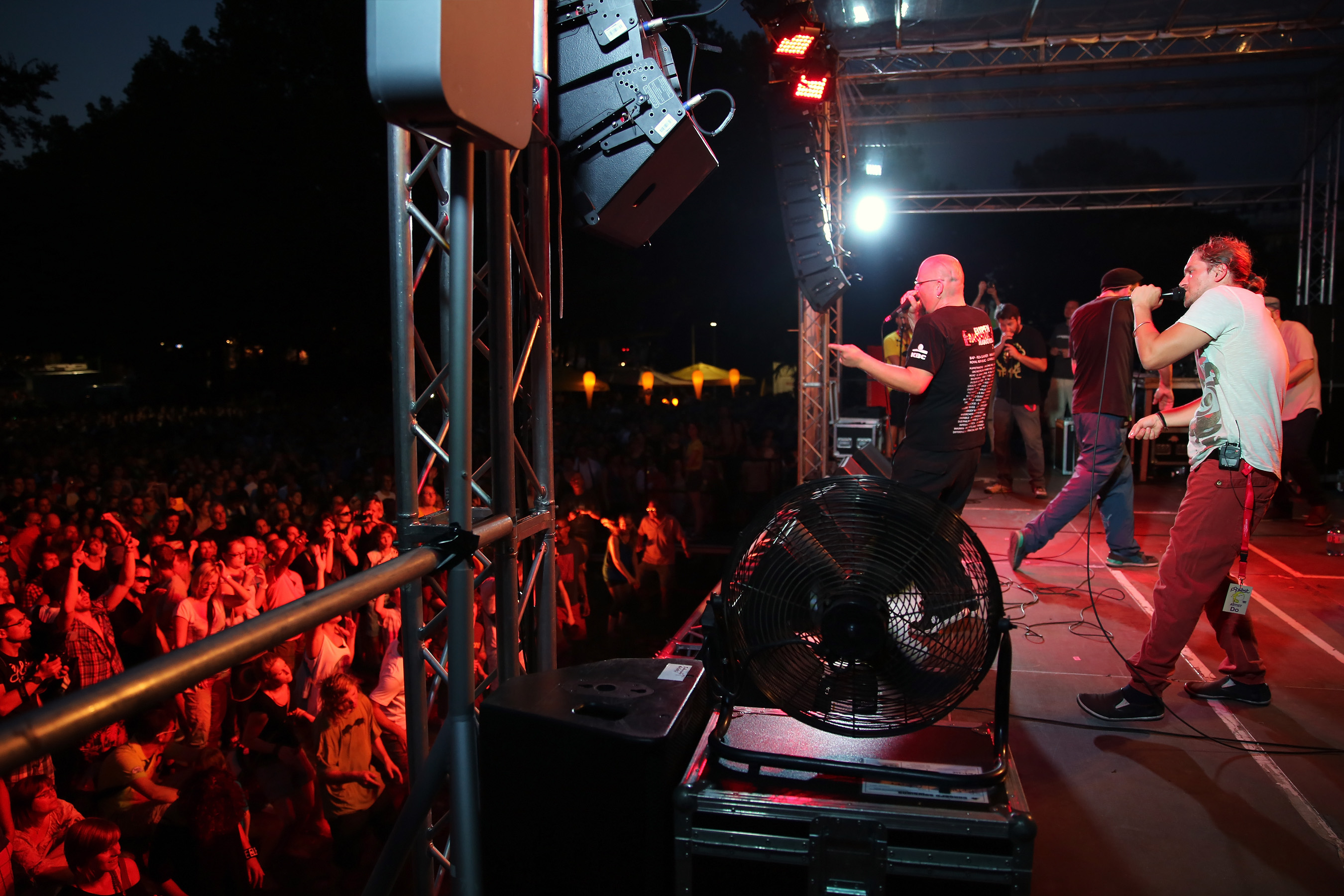
Bauchklang, concert at Karlsplatz during Popfest 2013 in Vienna, Austria.

Bauchklang is an Austrian beatboxing group. Bauchklang (literally "belly sound") is a five-piece "vocal groove collective" from Austria. With a unique mixture of human beatboxing, mouth percussion and vocal sounds, they are covering a musical landscape stretching from Electro over Minimal, to Dub and Hip Hop, using only their voices on the way.

== History ==
Formed in 1995, Bauchklang released their debut album "Jamzero" in 2001. Not only the support from the Austrians (Bauchklang won two Amadeus Austrian Music Awards for "Best Album" and the "FM4 Award" in 2002) this album also brought them to the renowned international Festival "Transmusicales de Rennes" in France. Based on this success, the Vocal Groove Project started touring through Europe and Canada.

== Awards and recognitions ==
After 4 years of permanent touring, Bauchklang released their second album "Many People" in 2005. Already regulars at the European festival circus, Bauchklang first ventured into Asia in 2009, with the release of their first live album/DVD "Live In Mumbai", and a five city club tour through India, which also earned them the Indiecision Award for "Best International Live Act". In 2010, they were Austria's musical ambassadors at the Shanghai Expo and won another two Amadeus Austrian Music Awards for "Best Live Act" and "Best Alternative" back home in their country. Also in 2010, the Vocal Groove Project brought along their third studio album "Signs". Guest artists contributed to the density and international flair of this album: spoken word icon Ursula Rucker from Chicago, poetry "slameur" Rouda and human beatboxer TEZ from Paris.

After the EP Le Mans, self-published in 2011, on which Bauchklang convinced with minimal techno, a year later Ray took the next logical step in the direction of dancefloor. Le Mans and Ray are rather experimental and create moods reminiscent of French electronic music à la Justice. At first, electronica and tech-house maxis rather than beat- boxing tracks insinuate themselves.

Besides the re-release of the EPs "Le Mans" and "Ray", "Akusmatik", their new album, which will be released in January 2013, comprises seven brand new titles which were produced by none other than techno pioneer Patrick Pulsinger, and which stake out the whole range of Bauchklang's work. However, they continue to depart from what one usually understands to be beat-boxing in order to define their own sound more precisely.

== Band members ==
- Andreas Fraenzl (Lead Vocals, Vocal Sounds)
- Gerald Huber (Human Beatbox, Vocal Sounds, Backing Vocals, Human Bass)
- Christian Birawsky a.k.a. Bina (Human Beatbox, Mouth percussion, Vocal Sounds)
- Alex Böck (Human Bass, Vocal Sounds)
- Philipp Sageder (Vocal Sounds, Backing Vocals, Mouth percussion)

== Past members ==
- Erich Schwab (Vocals)
- Stefan Eigenthaler (Vocals)
- Rainer Spangl (Vocal Sounds)
- Peter Groißböck (Vocals)
- Johannes Weinberger (Vocal Sounds, Lyrics)
- Karl Schrumpf (Mouth percussion)
- Pollard Berrier (Vocal Sounds, Lyrics)

== Awards ==
- 2001: Youngster of Arts Europe
- 2002: Amadeus Award in the Category "FM4 Alternative Act of the Year" and "Band Rock/Pop national"
- 2008: Indiecision Best Gig International 08 (Indien)
- 2010: Amadeus Award in the Categories „Best Live Act“ and „Alternative“
- 2011: Niederösterreichischer Kulturpreis (Lower Austrian Cultural Award) in the category "music"

== Discography ==
- 2001 : Jamzero [Album]
- 2001 : Don't Ask Me [MAXI-CD]
- 2005 : Don't Step [EP, Vinyl]
- 2005 : Many People [Album]
- 2006 : Rhythm Of Time/Barking News [EP, Vinyl]
- 2009 : Live in Mumbai [Album/DVD]
- 2010 : Signs [Album]
- 2010 : Signs [EP/Single, Digital]
- 2011 : Le Mans [EP, Vinyl]
- 2012 : Ray [EP, Vinyl]
- 2012 : Ray Remixed [Digital]
- 2013 : Akusmatik [Album]
- 2013 : Ray Remixed [EP, Vinyl]
