= Fatoni =

German rapper and actor (born 1984)

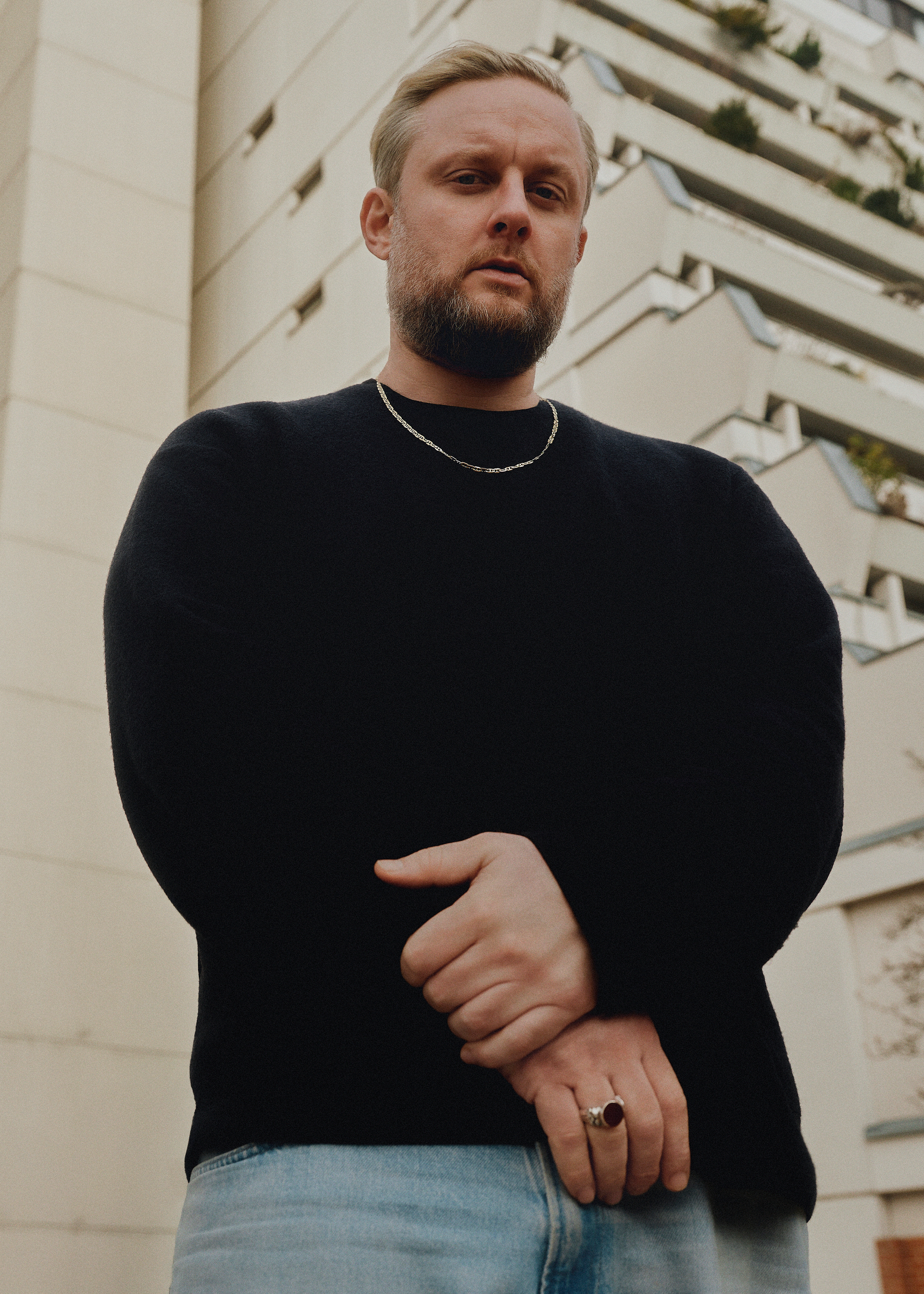
Fatoni in 2026

Anton Schneider (born 8 December 1984 in Munich), also known by his stage name Fatoni, is a German rapper and actor. He gained international recognition for his leading role in the Netflix series Crap Happens.

== Life ==
Anton Schneider grew up in Munich. He changed schools several times and, after completing the tenth grade, began training as a childcare worker. From 2009 to 2013, he studied acting at the Otto Falckenberg School. After first encountering hip hop as a teenager in the late 1990s, he began writing his own lyrics and performing.

He lives in Berlin.

=== Music ===
In 2000, Fatoni founded the hip hop group Creme Fresh together with rapper Keno and producer Bustla. Before disbanding in 2011, the group released four albums and an EP. Until 2010, Fatoni and his bandmates were also members of the brass band Moop Mama, before he embarked on a solo career.

In 2011, he released Solang früher alles besser war, his first solo album. In 2013, he released the collaborative album Nocebo with Edgar Wasser. The following year saw the release of his EP Die Zeit heilt alle Hypes, followed by the C'MON! EP in 2015.

Fatoni had his breakthrough in 2015 with the album Yo, Picasso, which he made together with producer Dexter. The album received positive reviews and reached number 23 on the German album chart and number two on the German hip hop chart. Kryptik Joe of Deichkind appears as a guest.

In the following years, Fatoni toured as a supporting act for artists including Fettes Brot, Beatsteaks, Alligatoah, Antilopen Gang, Casper and Deichkind. This was followed by solo tours throughout German-speaking Europe.

In March 2017, Fatoni released the mixtape Im Modus, featuring longtime associates such as Edgar Wasser and Juse Ju, as well as Maeckes, Retrogott and the electropop band Grossstadtgeflüster.

In October 2017, Fatoni released Alle Liebe nachträglich, a collaborative album with singer Mine. The two had previously collaborated on Mine's song Ziehst du mit. The album was nominated for the 2018 Preis für Popkultur in the categories Favourite Album and Most Exciting Idea/Campaign.

In 2019, Fatoni released his next solo album, Andorra, which reached number nine on the German album chart. The album features guest appearances by Casper and Dirk von Lowtzow of Tocotronic.

In May 2021, Delirium, Fatoni's second collaborative album with Edgar Wasser, was released. It reached number four on the German album chart and number one on the German hip hop chart.

In February 2023, Fatoni released the single Wunderbare Welt, announcing an album of the same name. Further singles followed before the album was released in May 2023. It reached number seven on the German album chart.

In May 2025, BAWRS, a collaborative album by Fatoni, Edgar Wasser and Juse Ju, was released. It was Fatoni's first album made in collaboration with two other artists. The album was preceded by the singles Nein! Doch! Ohh!, Beste Kombi and Crémant aus dem Senfglas.

In July 2026, Fatoni released the studio album Drama endet nie. It was preceded by the singles Nachos, Wann werd ich endlich ausgetauscht, Geld ist geil, Vergissmeinnicht (featuring Lambert), Drama endet nie (featuring Lakmann) and Alles neu.

Fatoni has also appeared as a featured artist on tracks by Max Herre, Grossstadtgeflüster, Die Höchste Eisenbahn, Antilopen Gang, Fettes Brot, Lakmann, Dexter, Maeckes, Juse Ju, Moop Mama, Mine, Mola and Betterov.

=== Acting ===
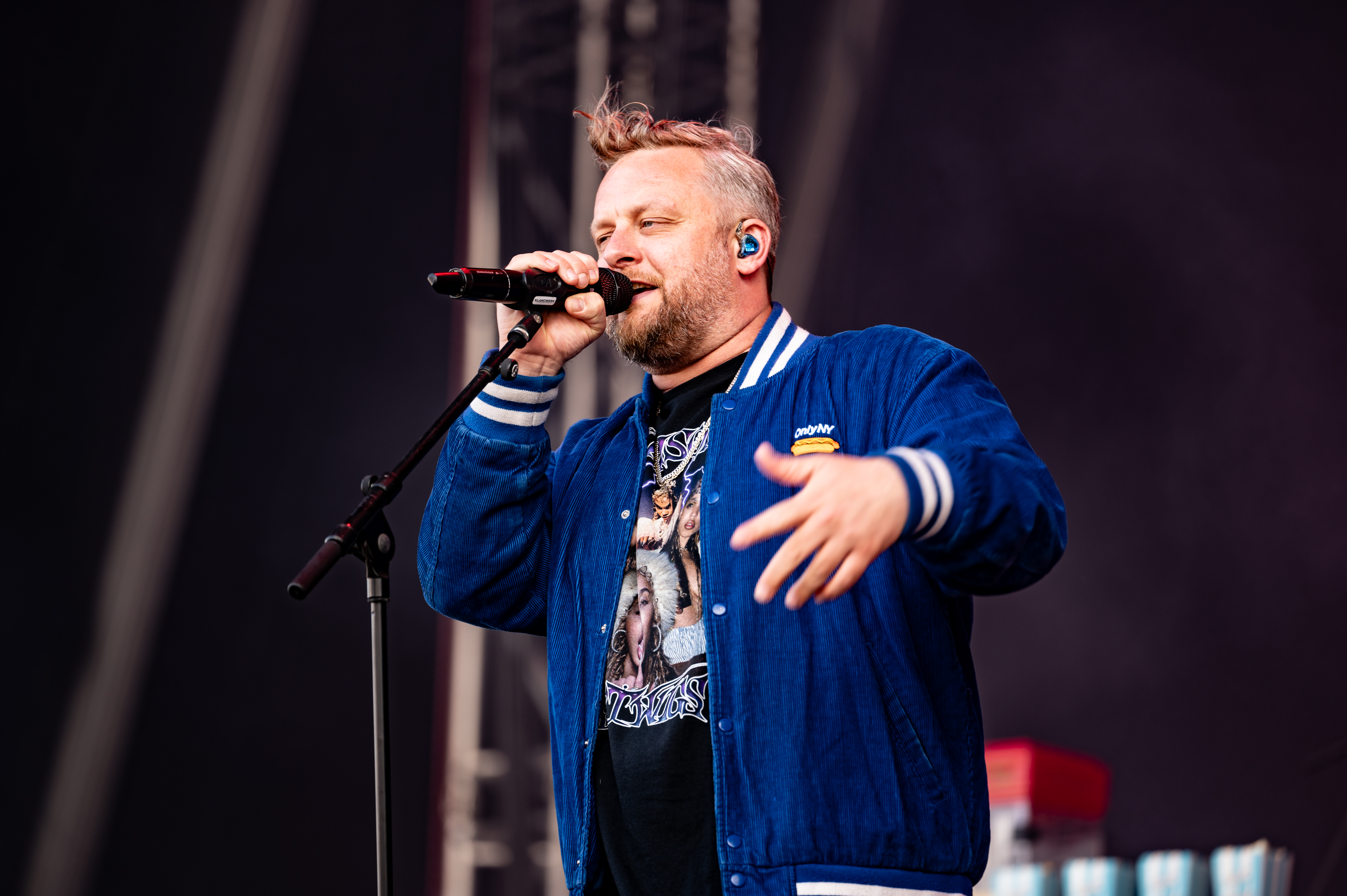
Fatoni at the Southside Festival in 2024

After completing his acting studies, Fatoni appeared as a guest performer at several theatres, including the Münchner Kammerspiele and Stadttheater Klagenfurt. From 2013 to 2015, he was a member of the ensemble at Theater Augsburg.

He has also appeared in film and television, including the series Tatort (2021), Normaloland (2022) and Fett und Fett (2022), as well as the feature film Home Sweet Home – Wo das Böse wohnt (2023).

In 2026, he played the lead role in the Netflix comedy series Kacken an der Havel. The character of rapper Toni is loosely based on Fatoni himself. The series was created by brothers Alex Schaad and Dimitrij Schaad.

From 2015 to 2023, Fatoni hosted Die Fatoni Show on the radio station PULS. In 2025, he hosted an episode of the satirical programme extra 3 Takeover.

As a narrator and voice actor, Fatoni has contributed to audiobooks and radio plays, including Die letzten Männer des Westens by Tobias Ginsburg in 2021, Goldstein by Volker Kutscher in 2022 and Drifter for Bayerischer Rundfunk in 2024.

=== Film and theatre music ===
In 2021, Fatoni and Roger Rekless wrote several songs for the television series Almost Fly, a production by Wiedemann & Berg Film.

In 2022, Fatoni wrote several songs for Anne Lenk's production of Minna von Barnhelm at the Deutsches Theater Berlin. The songs were produced by musician and actor Camill Jammal.

For the Netflix series Kacken an der Havel, in which he also plays the lead role, Fatoni wrote several songs, all of which were produced by Dexter. They were released on the series' official soundtrack on 27 February 2026.

== Discography ==
=== Albums ===
Year	Title	GER	AUT	SWI	Notes
2007	Prosecco Piff	—	—	—	With Juse Ju and Popbiz Enemy
2011	Solang früher alles besser war	—	—	—	
2013	Nocebo	—	—	—	With Edgar Wasser
2014	Die Zeit heilt alle Hypes	—	—	—	
2015	C'MON! EP	—	—	—	EP
2015	Yo, Picasso	23	—	—	With Dexter
2017	Im Modus	21	—	—	
2017	Alle Liebe nachträglich	47	—	—	With Mine
2019	Andorra	9	67	80	
2021	Delirium	4	27	80	With Edgar Wasser
2023	Wunderbare Welt	7	—	—	
2025	BAWRS	6	—	—	With Edgar Wasser and Juse Ju
2026	Drama endet nie	10	—	—	

Chart sources:

=== With Creme Fresh ===
Fatoni released four albums and an EP as a member of Creme Fresh.

== Theatre ==
- 2011: Nestbeschmutzung by Tobias Ginsburg
- 2013: The Virgin Suicides by Jeffrey Eugenides
- 2013: Der Brandner Kaspar und das ewig’ Leben, based on Franz von Kobell, by Kurt Wilhelm
- 2014: Einer und Eine by Martin Heckmanns
- 2014: Verrücktes Blut by Nurkan Erpulat and Jens Hillje
- 2014: Die Banditen von Gerolstein by Jacques Offenbach
- 2015: Goldland by Tobias Ginsburg
- 2015: Kleiner Mann – was nun? by Hans Fallada

== Filmography ==
- 2013: Elly Beinhorn – Alleinflug
- 2014: Twinfruit the Winfruit
- 2015: SOKO München
- 2016: Die Rosenheim-Cops
- 2020: Stichtag
- 2020: WaPo Bodensee
- 2020: SOKO Wismar
- 2021: Schlafschafe
- 2021: SOKO Potsdam
- 2021: Normaloland
- 2021: Fett und Fett
- 2021: Blutige Anfänger
- 2021: Tatort: Luna frisst oder stirbt
- 2023: Trauzeugen
- 2024: Home Sweet Home: Wo das Böse wohnt
- 2024: Szene Report
- 2026: Kacken an der Havel
