= Slut (band) =

German indie rock band

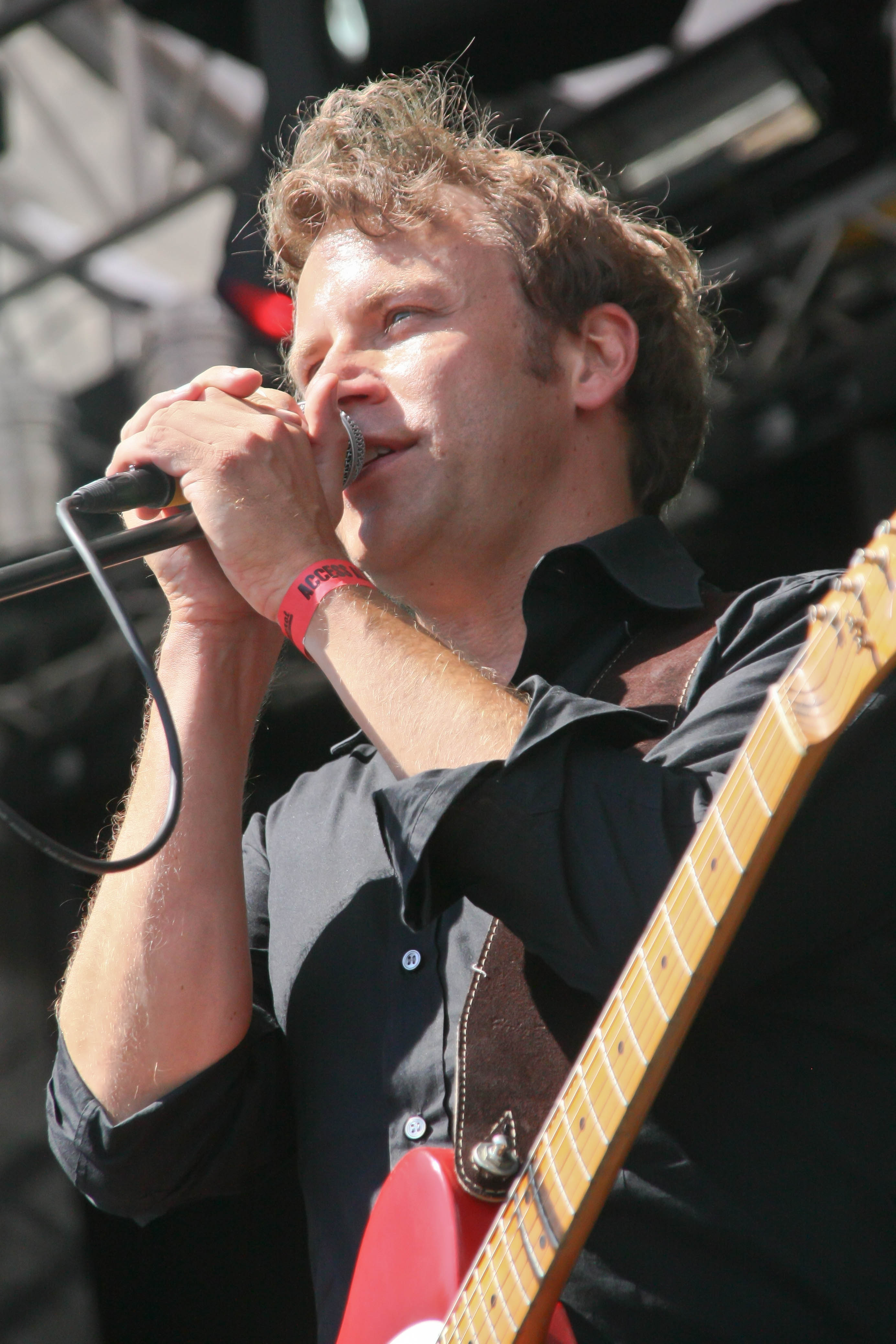
Slut lead vocalist Christian Neuburger in 2011

Slut is a German indie rock band from Ingolstadt, Bavaria. The band's lyrics are primarily written and sung in English.

== History ==
The band was founded in 1994 by Christian Neuburger (vocals, guitar), Matthias Neuburger (drums), Rainer Schaller (guitar), Gerd Rosenacker (bass guitar) and Phillip Zhang the accompanying keyboard artist. After they recorded their first album, Rene Arbeithuber (keyboard, vocals, guitar) also joined. From 1997 to 1998, along with Rene and Rainer's band, 'Pelzig', they lived and recorded in a castle near Ingolstadt. In 2002, two of their singles charted on the DAC: Easy to Love got to No. 8, and Time Is Not A Remedy hit No. 18. In 2005, Slut represented Bavaria in the Bundesvision Song Contest 2005, with the song "Why Pourquoi (I Think I Like You)", placing 12th with 17 points.

== Discography ==
=== Albums ===
- For Exercise And Amusement, 1996
- Sensation (EP), 1997
- Interference, 1998
- Lookbook, 2000
- Teardrops (EP), 2001
- Nothing Will Go Wrong, 2002
- ready, slut, go! (EP / Split with Readymade), 2003
- All We Need Is Silence, 2004
- Songs aus Die Dreigroschenoper (Songs from The Threepenny Opera), July 14, 2006
- StillNo1, 2008
- Corpus Delicti (collaboration with Juli Zeh), 2009
- Alienation, 2013
- Talks Of Paradise, 2021

=== Singles ===
- Welcome 2 (taken from Lookbook), 2000
- It Was Easier (taken from Lookbook), 2000
- Andy (taken from Lookbook), 2000
- Easy To Love (taken from Nothing Will Go Wrong), 2002
- Time Is Not A Remedy (taken from Nothing Will Go Wrong), 2002
- Lost Emotion (taken from All We Need Is Silence), 2004
- Why Pourquoi (taken from All We Need Is Silence), 2005
- Next Big Thing (taken from Alienation), 2013
- For the Soul There Is No Hospital, 2020
