= Zuka =

American artist

- self portrait, 1948
- Born: Zenaida Gourievna Booyakovitch; 1924; Los Angeles, California
- Died: December 18, 2016 (aged 91–92)
- Known for: Painting
- Website: zuka.fr

Zenaida Gourievna Booyakovitch (1924 – 18 December 2016), known as Zuka, was an American artist of Russian descent who lived and worked in Paris. She was awarded Chevalier of L'ordre des Arts et des Lettres of France in 1990.

== Biography ==
Zuka was born in 1924 in San Francisco to a family of Russian immigrants who came to the United States in 1920s. Her father was an officer in White Russian Army. Zuka received a bachelor's degree in Fine Arts from the University of Southern California.

In 1948 she went to Paris using the money she received from California gallery grant. Two years later, in 1950, she married political cartoonist Louis Mitelberg and they lived in Paris ever since. They had two sons, Roland and François.

== Work ==
Zuka started with portrait painting in the Los Angeles area when she was a student of the University of Southern California. When she moved to Paris in 1948 first she painted artists and writers in frozen poses, but then she moved to figures from history combining painting and collage in narrative works. Influenced by her husband she became interested in historical imagery and did her first series on the American Revolution in 1970s.

More prominent are Zuka's depictions of the French Revolution presented in the exhibition "The French Revolution through American Eyes," 1988. It was a result of her six years' research of the French literature for period portraits and other appropriate images to reconstruct people and events. Zuka's paintings of the French Revolution are of great significance as they position women as active participants of these historical events.

The most recent subjects of Zuka's paintings were birds, cows and nature. She became familiar with these subjects at her country house in Burgundy and now Zuka's cows exist in many formats ranging from large-scale oil paintings to postcards.

Zuka died on December 18, 2016.

== Exhibitions ==
=== Main personal exhibitions ===
- 2010 The birds of Zuka, Castle of Chastelux, Yonne.
- 2009 Cows of St-Brancher, Galerie Mouton Bleu, 2 Bridges, Pierre-Pertuis, Yonne.
- 2008-2009 The Birds of Zuka, Museum of Charlieu, Loire.
- 2007 Retrospective, the former Abattoirs, City of Avallon.
- 2007, 2005, 2001, 92, 82, 79, 75, 70, Darthea Speyer Gallery, Paris.
- 2000 Caisse d'Epargne du Limousin, Limoges.
- 1993 French House of New York University, New York.
- 1993 Art Center of Flaine, Haute-Savoie.
- 1989 University Gallery, Birmingham, Alabama.
- 1989 Baruch College Gallery, New York.
- 1989 Gray Gallery, New York.
- 1989 Otis Art Institute Gallery, Los Angeles.
- 1989 New York State University, Albany.
- 1989 The Woman and the Revolution, Banque Lambert, Brussels.
- 1989 The Woman and the Revolution, Mirmande, Drome.
- 1989 Valmy and Varennes, Braux Sainte-Cohière, Marne.
- 1988 Mona Bismarck Foundation, Paris.
- 1988 National Museum of Women in the Arts, Washington D.C.
- 1985 Crédit Agricole Mutuel Regional Bank of the Somme, Amiens.
- 1981 Jacqueline Anhalt Gallery, Los Angeles.
- 1976 1971 David Stuart Gallery, Los Angeles.
- 1976 Santa Barbara Museum, Santa Barbara, California.
- 1976 Montclair Museum, Montclair, New Jersey.
- 1978 1976, 1973 Betty Parsons Gallery, New York.
- 1966 1964 Lambert Gallery, Paris.
- 1947 1946 International Art Gallery, Los Angeles.
- 1945 University of Southern California, Los Angeles.

=== Main group exhibitions ===
- 2008 40th anniversary of the Darthea Speyer Gallery.
- 2006 Tribute to Kimber Smith, Jean Fournier Gallery, Paris.
- 2006 The Dreams, Darthea Speyer Gallery, Paris.
- 2004 Freedom and Revolution, Trouville (with Roseline Granet).
- 2004 Performing Arts Center Thousand Oaks, California.
- 2003 Pompon Museum, Saulieu.
- 1999 Animal, Art Center of Tremblay, Yonne.
- 1999 Icaunais Painters, Avallon, Pontigny, Sens, Thunder.
- 1998 30 years, Darthea Speyer Gallery.
- 1997 American Artists in Paris 1947–1997, Mona Bismarck Foundation, Paris.
- 1997 Animal, Mediatheque François Mitterrand, Oise.
- 1995 Animals, Darthea Speyer Gallery, Paris.
- 1994 The creators are a hit, Musée de la Poste, Paris.
- 1993 Pencil, feather, charcoal, Darthea Speyer Gallery.
- 1993 The William and Uytendale Scott Memorial Study Collection, Bryn Mawr, Pennsylvania.
- 1992, 1974, 1973 Salon de Mai, Paris.
- 1989 1st triennial of the Americas, Maubeuge.
- 1989 American artists in France, Avranches, Manche.
- 1988 Art Center of Flaine, Haute-Savoie.
- 1984 The part of women in contemporary art, Municipal Gallery, Vitry-sur-Seine.
- 1982 Salon of Montrouge.
- 1981 West 81, Minnesota Museum of Art, St. Paul.
- 1976 Biennial of Painting, Cagnes-sur-Mer.
- 1975 The Year of the Woman, Museum of Modern Art of the City of Paris.
- 1972 Betty Parsons Gallery, New York.
- 1967 U.S.A Group 67, Musée des Augustins, Toulouse.
- 1966 Ten Americans in Paris, American Cultural Center, Berlin.
- 1960 Four Seasons Gallery, Paris.
- 1958 Biennale of Paris.
- 1958 51st Salon of Young Painting, Paris.
- 1951 American Cultural Center, Paris.
- 1951 48th Salon for the under thirty, Paris.

=== Main public collections ===
- Lambert Bank, Brussels.
- Bernard Baruch Library, New York.
- National Fund of Contemporary Art, Paris.
- France Telecom Inc., New York.
- Israel Museum, Jerusalem.
- Louisiana State University Museum of Art.
- Ministry of Telecommunications, Paris.
- Museum of Modern Art of the City of Paris.
- Notre Dame University Art Gallery, Indiana.
- Quaker Society, New York.
- Rockland Public Library, Rockland, Illinois.
- The Art Collection of the First National Bank of Chicago.
- Twentieth Century Fund, New York.

=== Public and private orders ===
- 2008 Domaine Vaissière Wine Label (Sauvignon)
- 2006 Murals at the FIAF (French Institute Alliance Française) from New York
- 2004 Acquisition of 7 paintings for Chumash Conference Hall, City Hall, Thousand Oaks, California.
- 1989 Fresco of carvings The Tree of Liberty, French Institute from New York.
