= Das ist alles von der Kunstfreiheit gedeckt =

Song by Danger Dan

from the album Das ist alles von der Kunstfreiheit gedeckt
- Released: 21 March 2021
- Genre: pop music
- Length: 3:48
- Label: Antilopen Geldwäsche
- Songwriter: Danger Dan

"Das ist alles von der Kunstfreiheit gedeckt" is a song written by German rapper Danger Dan, who is also part of the band Antilopen Gang. The first person narrator states that the song's aim is to "test the limits of what is permitted and what is forbidden" (original: "die Grenzen auszuloten, was erlaubt und was verboten ist"). It was published on 26 March 2021 as the first single of an album, also called Das ist alles von der Kunstfreiheit gedeckt, by the label of his band Antilopen Gang. The song made it into the German and Austrian singles charts. On 2 April 2021, the song started off at number 69 on the German singles charts. Within two weeks of publishing, the corresponding music video had been viewed 1.3 million times on YouTube. On 9 April 2021, the song was performed by artist Danger Dan, accompanied by pianist Igor Levit, on the German TV show ZDF Magazin Royale.

Before publishing the song, Danger Dan showed it to his lawyer in order to have an affirmation of the legal acceptability.

== Content ==
As the title indicates, the song is about artistic freedom, which is continually referenced while calling attention to the Neue Rechte, a right-wing movement in Germany, antisemitism, and racism.

The first two verses are written in Konjunktiv, a grammatical mood with which the speakers distance themselves from what they say. The effect is reinforced by the introduction "mal ganz spekulativ" (English: "entirely theoretical").

Content-wise, advocates of conspiracy theories and right-wing ideologies are being criticised. The author names Jürgen Elsässer, Götz Kubitschek, Ken Jebsen and Alexander Gauland.

In the chorus, the legitimacy of these criticisms is satirically underlined: "Juristisch wär' die Grauzone erreicht / Doch vor Gericht machte ich es mir wieder leicht / Zeig mich an und ich öffne einen Sekt / Das ist alles von der Kunstfreiheit gedeckt" (English: "Legally, this would be in the grey area / but in court, I'd choose an easy way out / report me to the police and I'll open a bottle of prosecco / this is within the realms of artistic freedom").

The second verse alludes to Kurt Tucholsky's poem Rosen auf den Weg gestreut from 1931.

For the third verse, the author switches to indicative mood. He underlines his condemnation of the aforementioned people and views and finishes by stating that militancy is necessary when facing fascists and right tendencies within the police. In that context, he points to Oury Jalloh's death and the role of secret services with regards to the formation of the NSU.
