= 3 Feet Smaller =

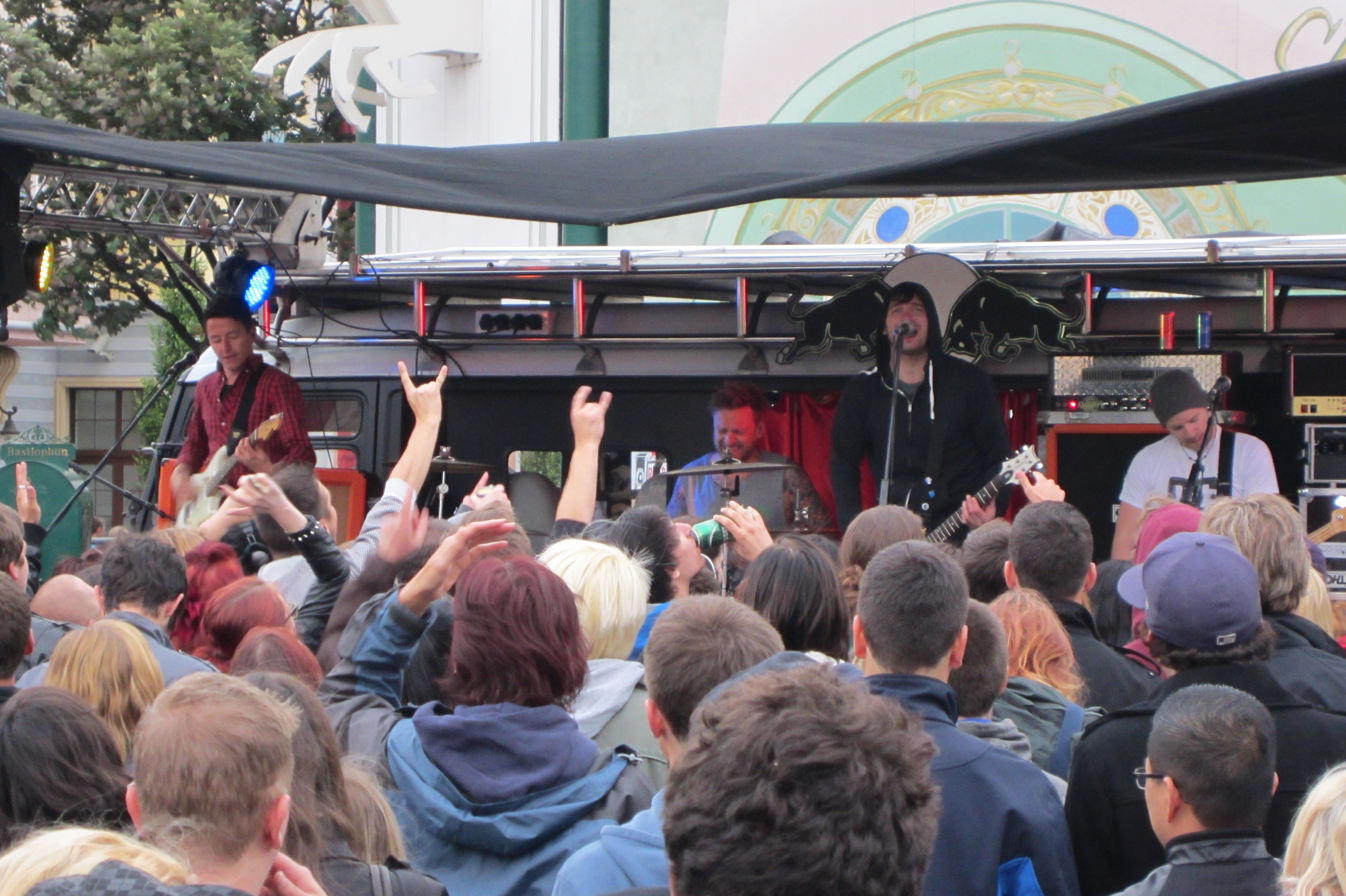
- 3 Feet Smaller performing at the 2012 Wurstelprater

Background information
- Origin: Vienna, Austria
- Genres: Punk
- Years active: 2000–present
- Labels: Universal Austria
- Members: Marcus Smaller; Roberto Franko; The General
- Past members: El Howdy; Dipmaster; Schorsch Zwiebelmayer

3 Feet Smaller is an Austrian punk rock band formed in 2000.

Their first big concert was at the 2 Days a Week festival in Wiesen in 2001. The first single of their debut album was in the Austrian alternative charts for many weeks. Their second single topped the charts in East Switzerland.

Over the years they have played many concerts in Austria and other European countries. They also played as support for other bands like The Offspring and Die Ärzte. They released five albums, a Christmas CD, and an EP. The band also appeared on the soundtrack of the movie Dead in 3 Days and the skiing video game Freak Out: Extreme Freeride.

After the end of "3 Feet Smaller'", three former members of the band later reformed under the title "Lian" and released a self-titled new album in June 2016. Lead vocalist Marcus Smaller has pursued a solo career with two albums.

== Members ==
=== Current lineup ===
- Marcus Smaller – lead vocals, guitar (2000–present)
- Roberto Franko – drums (2000–present)
- The General – bass (2008–present), bass / guitar (2004–2006)

=== Former members ===
- El Howdy – bass (2005–2008)
- Dipmaster – guitar (2000–2005)
- Schorsch Zwiebelmayer – bass (2000–2004)

== Discography ==
=== Albums ===
- 2001: Damn, We Need a Title for This Record
- 2002: Insert Album Title Here: .....
- 2004: 3rd Strike
- 2009: December 32
- 2011: 3 Feet Smaller

=== EP ===
- 2002: One Night Stand

=== Other ===
- 2000: A Very Special Christmas Day (Christmas-CD)
- 2001: What About You, Me and a Horse (online mini album)
- 2005: Five Years of Bowling Punk (lve DVD)
