= Kinderzimmer Productions =

Kinderzimmer Productions is a German hip hop band from Ulm (in the jargon of the band, "U-Stadt"). They consist of Quasi Modo (Sascha Klammt, DJ) and Textor (Henrik von Holtum, MC). They released their first album in 1994. Their name is both a tribute to the early hip hop group Boogie Down Productions and a reference to the child's play room (German: Kinderzimmer) in the parental house of von Holtum, in which the first two albums were conceived. In 2007 they announced their disbandment. Nevertheless, in 2019, they have paused their hiatus, releasing a record named 'Es kommt in Wellen'.

== History ==
Textor's mother, Lena Möllerström, was a Swedish jazz singer, while his father, Günther von Holtum, was a classically trained drummer, so music was a constant element of daily life in the von Holtum household, leading to a jazz influence which can be heard in many Kinderzimmer Productions tracks.

The band's self-titled debut album had to be withdrawn from the market fairly soon after its release. The song "Back" contained an uncleared sample from the Stranglers' recording "Golden Brown". The Stranglers had already agreed to the sample being used, but their record company invoked its exclusive rights to it regardless, and the original album can no longer be distributed. It was re-released in 1998 under the name Die Erste, with the uncleared sample in "Back" replaced by a distinctively off-key piano melody played by Textor.

After the first album was withdrawn, Kinderzimmer Productions proceeded more cautiously with the second. In the track "Intro", a sample of Kate Bush is announced with the words An dieser Stelle stand ein Sample von Kate Bush ("At this point there was a sample of Kate Bush"). The album itself contains many jazzy samples strongly evocative of the 1930s to 1960s.

== Style ==
More than with most German hip hop, the tracks are shaped by a dynamic combination of samples (often jazzy or funky, frequently quoting well-known hip hop classics). Textor's sing-speak is marked by high speed, complicated sentence constructions and the occasional use of foreign words and technical terms. In "Back" Textor sings Wie ich schon sagte, ich schreib meine Zeilen mal widerlich schnell, mal fettig und langsam, mal sinnvoll, mal sinnlos ("Like I said, sometimes I write my lines obscenely fast, sometimes slow and flabby, sometimes meaningful, sometimes meaningless").

As a special feature on their homepage, users can make their own hip hop tape with words spoken by Textor.

== Discography ==
- Todesverachtung to Go (2020)
- Over and out – Live aus dem Konzerthaus Dortmund (2009)
- Asphalt (2007)
- Irgendjemand muss doch (2004)
- Ich bin, du nicht sicher (2004)
- Wir sind da wo oben ist (2002)
- Die hohe Kunst der tiefen Schläge (1999)
- Die Erste (1998) (reissue of Kinderzimmer Productions)
- Im Auftrag ewiger Jugend und Glückseligkeit (1996)
- Kinderzimmer Productions (1994)
