= Moop Mama =

German brass band

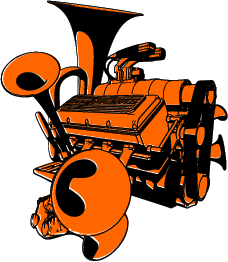
- Logo of Moop Mama, the MoopMotor

Background information
- Origin: Munich, Bavaria, Germany
- Genres: Hip hop; brass
- Years active: 2009–present
- Website: www.moopmama.com

Moop Mama is a brass band based in Munich, Bavaria, Germany. The ten-person group includes two percussionists and a rapper, and was founded in 2009. They describe their style as urban brass, mixing hip hop and the music of traditional marching bands. The band has played at festivals, for television and film, and at political events, with a focus on spontaneous concerts in public space. Beginning in 2011, the band has recorded albums, singles and videos.

== History ==
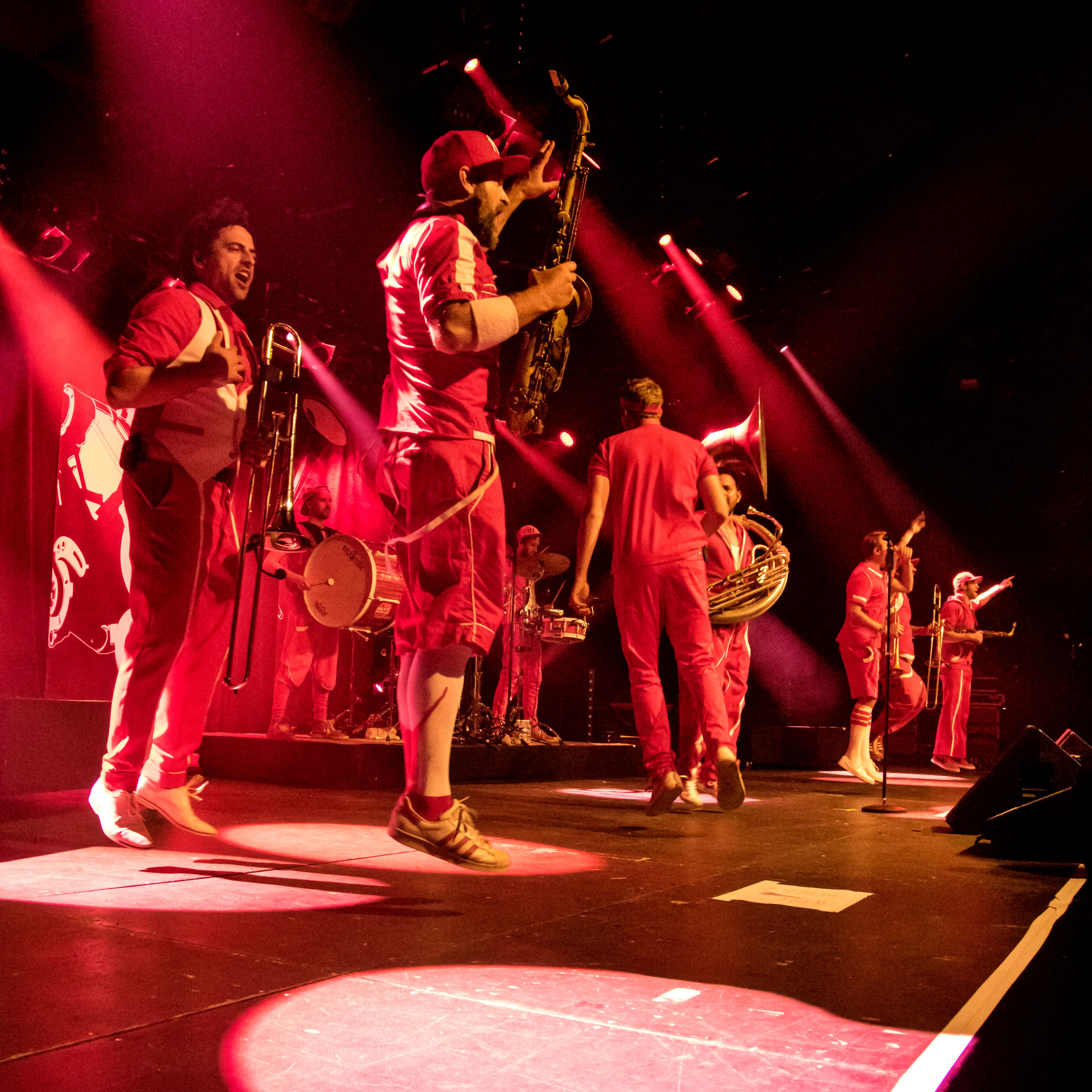
At the ZMF in Freiburg in 2016

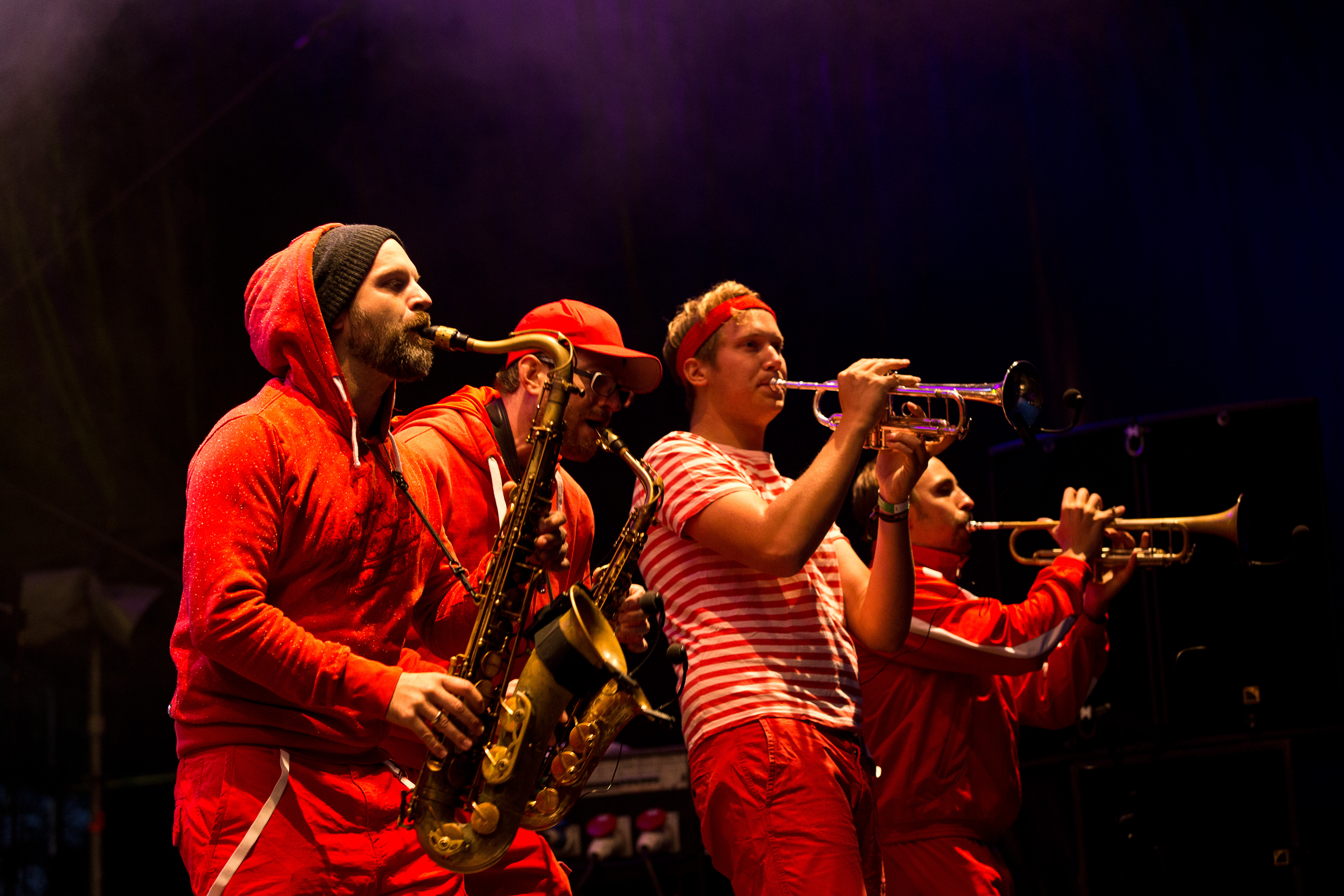
At Rocken am Brocken in 2015

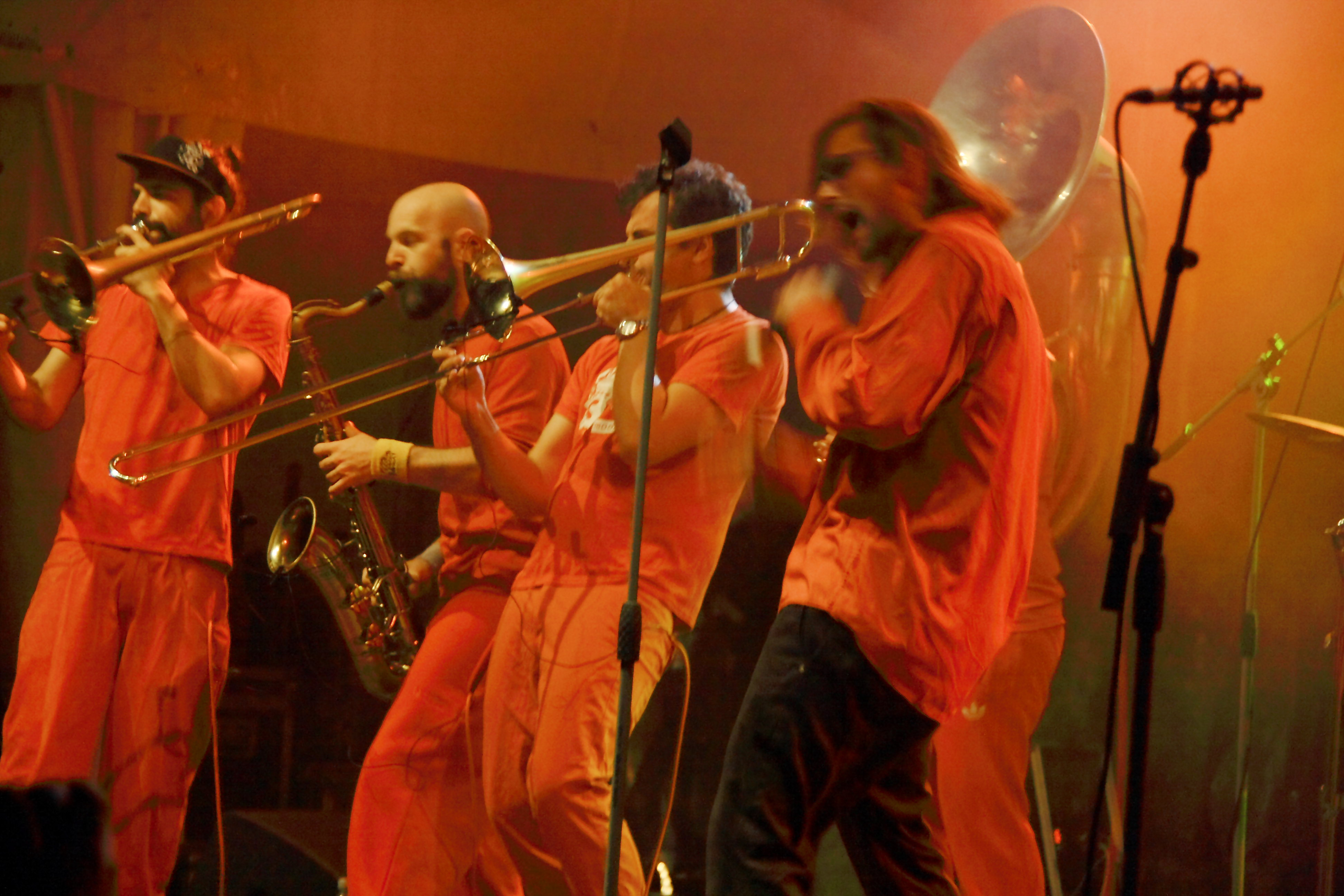
At TFF Rudolstadt in 2012

Moop Mama was founded in 2009 at the initiative of the saxophonist Marcus Kesselbauer, as a group of seven brass players, two percussionists and a rapper. Kesselbauer is also the band's composer and arranger. Their first "public rehearsal" was at Munich's Englischer Garten in 2009. They became recognized for many short unannounced concerts in public space (Guerilla-Konzerte), such as pedestrian areas and parks, using a megaphone to amplify the rapper's voice. Sometimes the concerts were regarded as unwanted noise (Ruhestörung), causing conflicts with the police.

The band appeared on television, such as Inas Nacht and ttt – titel, thesen, temperamente in 2011, and Checker Can in 2012. They have performed regularly for the local Vereinsheim Schwabing of Bayerischer Rundfunk (BR). For the film Vatertage – Opa über Nacht, they supplied part of the film score and appeared as actors.

The band performed at festivals such as in 2012 at the Fusion Festival in Lärz, the Splash! festival in Ferropolis of Gräfenhainichen, the Open Air Gampel in Switzerland, the Taubertal Festival in Rothenburg ob der Tauber, the Burg Herzberg Festival in Breitenbach am Herzberg, TFF Rudolstadt, Zelt-Musik-Festival in Freiburg, and the Elbjazz festival in Hamburg. They also played in the program of the 2012 Champions League final in Munich, and supporting Jan Delay at the Tollwood Festival. They performed at the 2016 Highfield Festival in Großpösna, at the Mini-Rock-Festival in Horb the same year, and at the 2019 Southside in Neuhausen ob Eck.

In September 2012, the band played on an invitation of Goethe-Institut in Thessaloniki and Athens. In September 2018, the band played a spontaneous concert at the Hambach Forest to protest against its clearing by RWE. On 21 June 2019, they performed as part of a large demonstration of Fridays for Future at the Aachen Tivoli for several thousand people. The band played a 10th anniversary concert at the Tollwood in the Munich Musik-Arena on 18 July 2019, announced as playing "no finished beats, no samples, no electronic instruments" and "brute loud and secretly quiet".

== Discography ==
=== Albums ===
- 2011: Deine Mutter (Millaphon Records)
- 2013: Das rote Album (Millaphon Records)
- 2016: M.O.O.P. Topia (Mutterkomplex)
- 2017: Live, Vol. 1 (Mutterkomplex)
- 2018: ICH (Mutterkomplex urban media)
- 2020: Live Vol.2 (Mutterkomplex urban media)
- 2024: Wieder Laut (Mutterkomplex urban media)

=== Singles ===
- 2011: König der Stadtmitte (Millaphon Records)
- 2012: Liebe (Millaphon Records)
- 2013: Party der Versager (Millaphon Records)
- 2014: Stadt die immer schläft (Millaphon Records)
- 2016: Meermenschen (Mutterkomplex)
- 2016: Lösch das Internet (Mutterkomplex)
- 2016: Die Erfindung des Rades (Mutterkomplex)
- 2017: 25/8 (Live 2016) (Mutterkomplex)
- 2017: Komplize (Live 2016) (Mutterkomplex)
- 2018: Molotow (Mutterkomplex)
- 2018: Nüchtern (Mutterkomplex)
- 2021: Alte Männer (Mutterkomplex)
- 2021: Schwimm (Mutterkomplex)
- 2021: Aus dem Fenster (Mutterkomplex)
- 2022: Schau den Mond an (Der Mond ist aufgegangen) ft. Rodger Reckless (Mutterkomplex)
- 2023: Alles am Weg ft. Älice (Mutterkomplex)
- 2023: Bildet Banden ft. Älice (Mutterkomplex)
- 2023: Bin Da ft. Älice (Mutterkomplex)
- 2024: Nie Wieder ft. Älice (Mutterkomplex)
- 2024: Blechdach ft. Älice (Mutterkomplex)
- 2024: In Weiß ft. Älice (Mutterkomplex)
- 2025: Mhm Aha ft. Älice (Mutterkomplex)

=== Videos ===
- 2012: Liebe
- 2013: Party der Versager
- 2014: Stadt die immer schläft
- 2016: Meermenschen
- 2016: Lösch das Internet
- 2016: Die Erfindung des Rades
- 2016: Alle Kinder (feat. Jan Delay)
- 2017: Komplize (Live)
- 2017: 25/8 (Live)
- 2018: Molotow
- 2018: Nüchtern
- 2018: Kapuze
- 2022: Aus Dem Fenster
- 2024: Alles Am Weg (feat. Älice)
- 2024: Bildet Banden (feat. Älice)
- 2024: Bin Da (feat. Älice)
- 2024: Nie Wieder (feat. Älice)
- 2024: In Weiß (feat. Älice)
