= Das Fest (Karlsruhe) =

Open air event in Karlsruhe, Germany

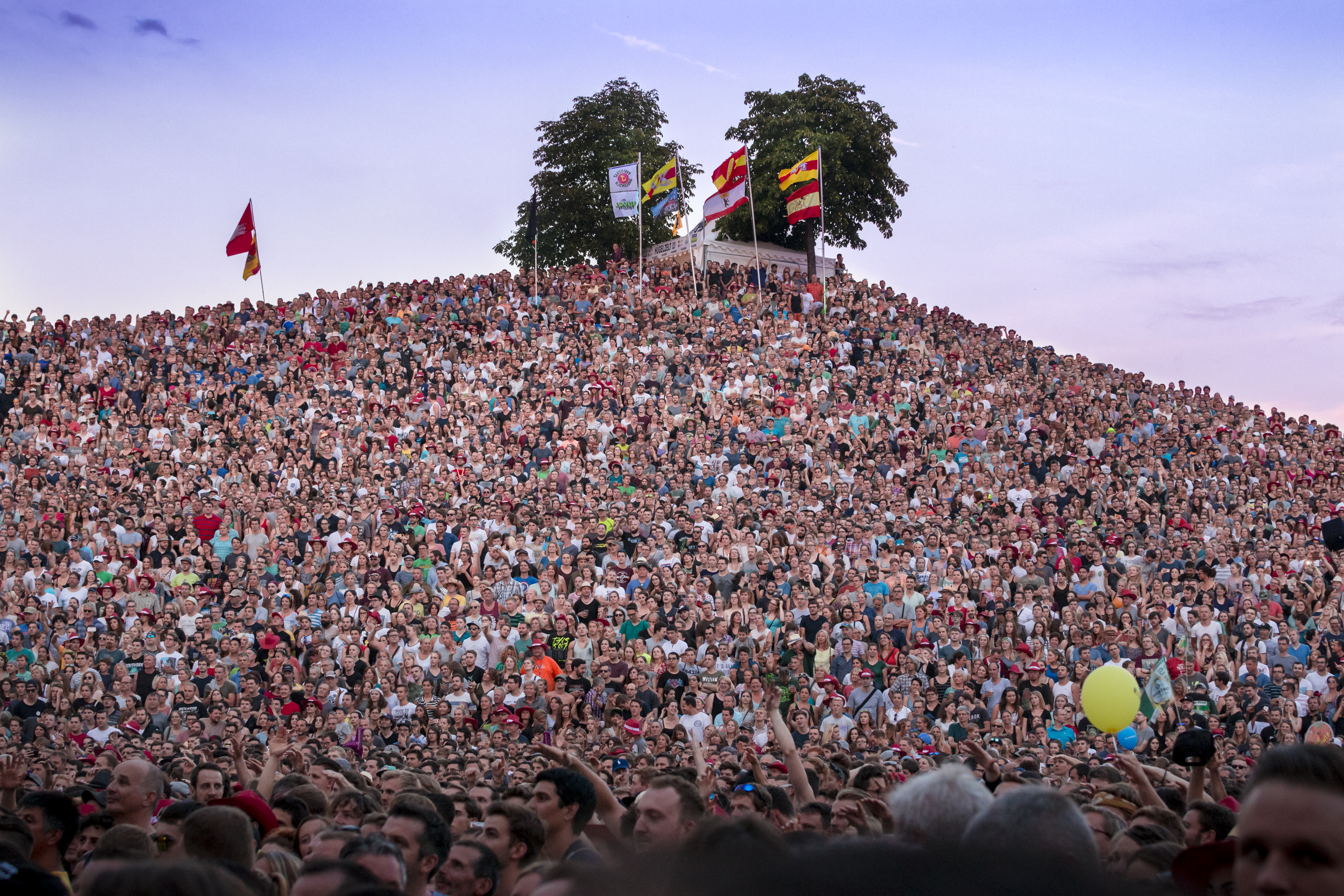
- 40,000 spectators on Mount Klotz
- Genre: Rock, Pop, hip hop, Reggae, Dancehall, Folk, Punk, Techno, Tech house
- Locations: Karlsruhe, Günther-Klotz-Anlage
- Years active: 1985 - present
- Attendance: 200,000 - 250,000
- Organiser: KME Karlsruhe Marketing und Event GmbH
- Website: www.dasfest.de

Das Fest (German: The Festival) is one of the biggest open-air concerts in Germany, which has taken place in Karlsruhe since 1985, and is organized by Karlsruhe Event GmbH. After the first few years of existence, its date was set for the last weekend before the summer holidays in Baden-Württemberg, which starts at the end of July. The festival has gained national popularity with its concerts, making up the main part of the event.

== Program and organization ==
Das Fest has been organized by Karlsruhe Event GmbH since 2014. Its organizers pursue an aim clearly different to other big German festivals, which oft polarize by concentrating on certain genres. Das Fest is designed to attract and to entertain all social groups. Alongside the music stages hosting regional, national and international artists, there is a broad program (including sports) for children and families each year. Children can visit a mobile game area with included childcare, set up by the Karlsruhe initiative Mobile Spielaktion. The Fest-Café, a theater stage and a classical concert, which always takes place on the main stage on Sunday morning, however, are aimed at older generations.

More than 200,000 people attend the festival every year, and in 2006, the number was as high as 330,000 according to the event organizers. In 2009, the total number of visitors reached a record of 400,000. Entry into the sport, family, and camping grounds is free but, since 2010, tickets costing €5 a day are required for the mound and mainstage on Friday and Saturday. In 2011, this was extended to Sunday, and in 2018, the price increased to €10.

Famous artists such as: Seeed, Deichkind, Juli (band), Silbermond, The Bosshoss, Faithless, PUR, Fury in the Slaughterhouse, Apocalyptica, Guano Apes, New Model Army, Culcha Candela, Fischer-Z, Bad Religion, Tito & Tarantula, BAP, Such A Surge, Gentleman (musician), Chumbawamba, H-Blockx, Ska-P, Fünf Sterne deluxe, Simple Minds, Beatsteaks, Sunrise Avenue, Peter Fox, Die Fantastischen Vier, Denyo, and Mando Diao have previously performed at Das Fest.

== History ==
Tihomir Lozanovski (Wolkenreise and current member of the band Trigon), organized an open-air concert in Karlsruhe during the Summer of 1984. The organizers obtained all the necessary permits from the Environment Agency and the police. Following this initial open-air concert, the group of organizers split up and Das Fest was born. The special permits from the previous year provided the groundwork for the festival. Originally, the idea was to bring bands from Karlsruhe and the local community together.

Das Fest has evolved over the years from a small open-air festival to a music festival, renowned beyond the local region and visited by more than 200.000 people every year. The concept of the festival has constantly been extended at the same time with this evolution. In 1998, the café of Das Fest was conducted for the first time. In the preparation week before the festival, food and drinks are offered (mainly in the form of beer garden) as well as an evening music program on a small stage. In 2000, the next sustainable expansion of the festival followed with its own DJ-stage, which received a big resonance and became soon established as an integral part of the festival.

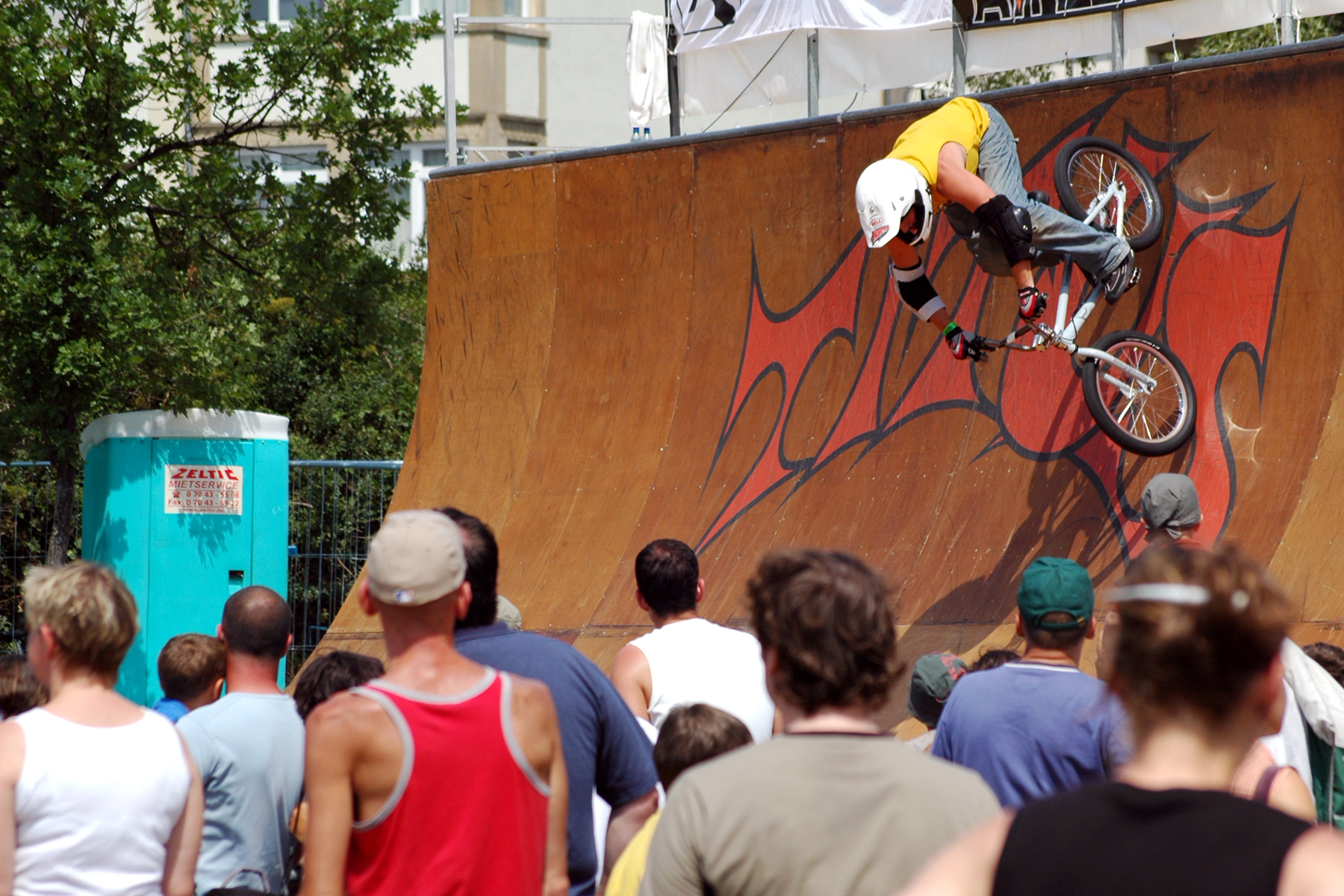
The Half-Pipe in 2004

A greater turning-point was reached in 2001: Due to the festival being mainly financed by the sale of beverages, the festival grounds were firstly completely fenced, and once at the (still free) entrance, visitors were checked for brought food and drinks. Initially, this was heavily criticised. The number of visitors showed that the festival's popularity didn't suffer from this. Over the course of the fencing process the grounds were expanded westwards, so the tent stage could have its own place. The Funpark, which, so far, had taken place in the Europahalle, was integrated as a sports park into the festival grounds, and has been on a constant expansion-mode. Alongside activities such as juggling and riding unicycles, serious competitions such as the German Skateboard Championship in the Half-Pipe or the national Volleyclub tournament have taken place since then each year.

In the last few years, the organization mainly focused on the aspect of security due to the constantly rising number of visitors. In cooperation with the police and medical corps the security concept was improved every year. These improvements effected for example the division of the festival site (no stalls near the main stage, the improved system of paths) as well as the layout and organization of the entrance area. Youth protection teams consisting of policemen, medics and social workers were stationed in front of the entrances to contain excessive use of alcohol among minors before entering the festival site.

After a 2006 performance by Seeed, the entry to the Festgelände had to be halted for the first time due to overcrowding. As a result, the youth committee of the city announced that Das Fest would not be continuing in the same manner as beforehand. Next to the fact that the chairman of the club would be personally liable for losses if they occurred, one of the main reasons was the immense financial outlay, and the need for a large pool of staff, which the committee would have to carry.

On 25 September 2007, the city council of Karlsruhe eventually voted for the establishment of a so-called "separate concession" or "separately managed concession", one of five alternative models presented to the council. Additionally, the city promised to fund Das Fest by up to €150,000 for three years initially; this was supposed to keep the festival going until the year 2010. On 29 September 2009, however, the city's youth committee announced that it was not able to continue the festival. A loss of €180,000 in the year 2009 and the significant security problem were reasons given by the committee for this decision.

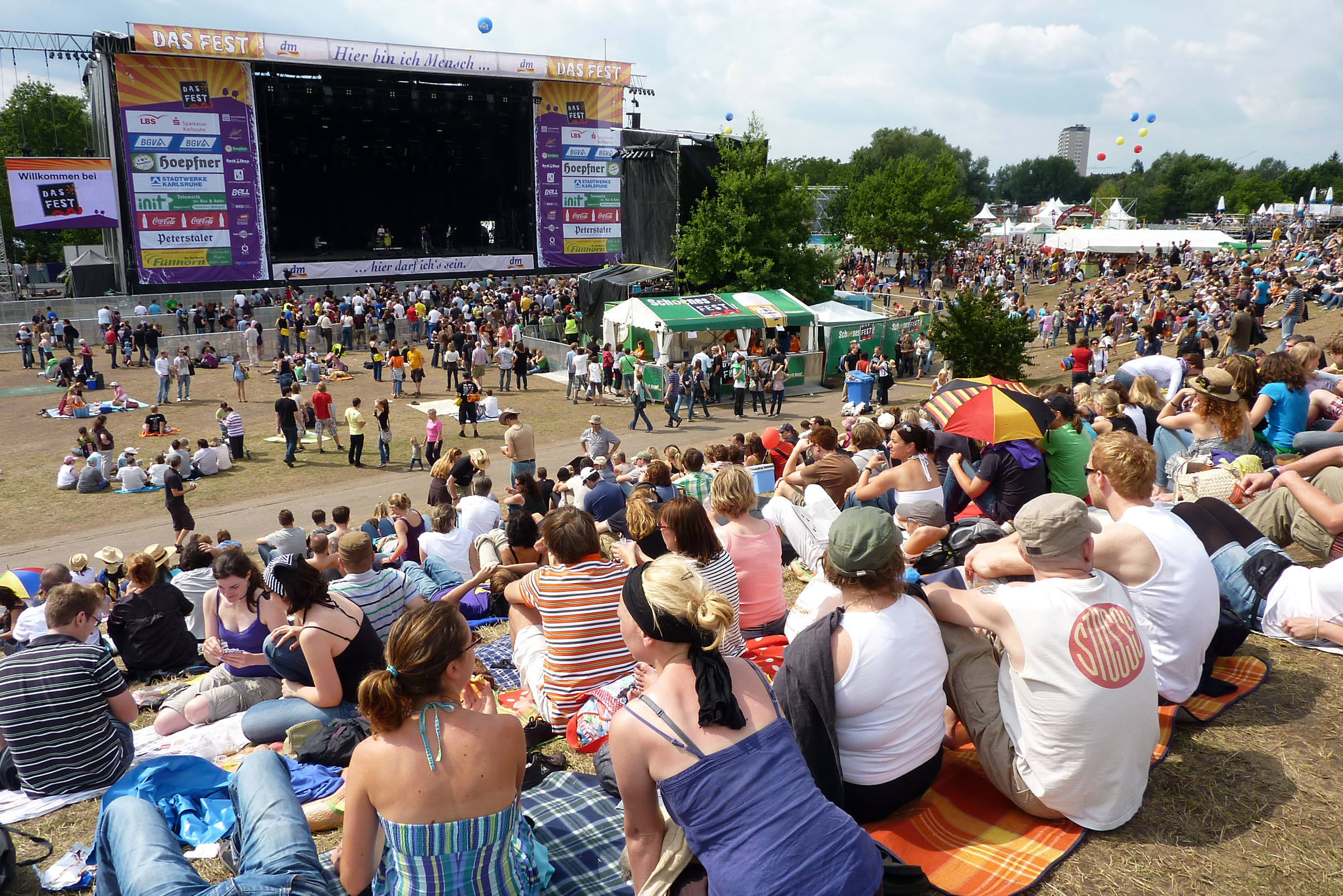
Festival site and the main stage in 2010

In December 2009, the municipal council decided to continue the festival under the guidance of 'Das Fest GmbH'. Das Fest took place from 23 to 25 July 2010 and for the first time, it cost money for entry. The site was divided into a smaller sports and family area, which continues to be accessible free of charge, and a larger music area. The sports and family area includes the DJ stage, the tent stage, an information section, and various special offers. The music area includes the main stage around the so-called 'Mount Klotz' as well as the disco stage. For the first time, day tickets for the music area were sold at a price of 5 euros on Friday and Saturday and, since 2011, were also sold for the festival on Sunday, which had previously been free.

Due to the coronavirus pandemic, Das Fest 2020 was cancelled in April 2020. With the cancellation, it was also announced that most of the artists would be at Das Fest in summer 2021. In April 2021, Das Fest 2021 was cancelled because the pandemic situation and restrictions would not allow a festival of this size.

Das Fest returned in 2022 and has been held every year since. The 2026 edition is scheduled for July 23-26.

== Line-ups (selected) ==
- 1985: Capband feat. Phill Edwards, Haindling, Kolbe-Illenberger, Maanam, The Foundation
- 1986: Dorfcombo, Kevin Coyne, Pur
- 1987: Hob Goblin, Funk 11
- 1988: Grachmusikoff, Jan Akkermann's Heartware, M. Walking on the Water, Pink Cream 69, Ralf Illenberger's Circle, Wolfgang Schmid's Superdrumming Band feat. Pete York
- 1989: Dr. Feelgood, Multicoloured Shades, The Formula
- 1990: Chaka Khan, Kraan, Mitch Ryder, Oropax, Volker Kriegel Band, Züri West
- 1991: No Sports, The Rhythm and Blues Circus feat. Cozy Powell & Chris Farlowe
- 1992: Fury in the Slaughterhouse, Sally Barker
- 1993: Fischer-Z, Alvin Lee Band, Maceo Parker, Nits, The Brandos
- 1994: Carmel, The Jeremy Days, Los Lobotomys, Marla Glen
- 1995: Big Country, Illegal 2001, Jazzkantine, Joan Armatrading, Six Was Nine
- 1996: Across the Border, Angélique Kidjo, Chico Science & Nação Zumbi, Cultured Pearls, Willy DeVille, Schwoißfuaß, The Seer
- 1997: Neneh Cherry, Dauner/Mangelsdorff, Ezio, Keb' Mo', Ocean Colour Scene, Simple Minds, Suzanne Vega
- 1998: Apocalyptica, Faithless, Guano Apes, New Model Army, Nils Petter Molvær, NTS, The Bobby Byrd Show, Tito & Tarantula
- 1999: Daúde Candeal, Fun Lovin' Criminals, George Clinton, Heather Nova, Jovanotti, Stoppok, Big Black Monsoon, No Sex until Marriage
- 2000: Bananafishbones, BAP, Candy Dulfer, Ani DiFranco, Chumbawamba, Mambo Kurt, Such A Surge, The Wailers
- 2001: Asian Dub Foundation, H-Blockx, Fünf Sterne deluxe, The Stranglers, The Levellers, Till Brönner, Incognito
- 2002: Across the Border, Bauchklang, Candy Dulfer, Hennes Bender, Jovanotti, Joy Denalane, NTS, Son Goku, Sportfreunde Stiller, Van Morrison, Vanessa Amorosi
- 2003: 17 Hippies, Bülent Ceylan, Frau Doktor, Füenf, Itchy Poopzkid, Jimmy Cliff, Königwerq, Moloko, Morcheeba, Seeed, Ska-P, The Explosion
- 2004: 2raumwohnung, Die Happy, Faithless, Gentleman, Jethro Tull, Till Brönner, Wir sind Helden
- 2005: Amparanoia, Edoardo Bennato, Ercandize & DJ Katch, Jackie Cola, Juli, Lenny Kaye, Lunik, Moneybrother, Pat Cash, Rough Lingo, SaltaCello feat. Peter Lehel, Silbermond, The Robocop Kraus, Within Temptation
- 2006: Creature, AKa Frontage, Basta, Christoph Sonntag, Culcha Candela, Die Schrillmänner, Kate Mosh, Kettcar, Kosheen, La Vela Puerca, Main Concept, New Model Army, Seachange, Seeed, Skin, Damnasty
- 2007: Abuela Coca, Beatsteaks, Die Fantastischen Vier, Fotos, Jess Jochimsen, Lampshade, Nico Suave & DJ Sparc & Denyo, Ohrbooten, Pink Cream 69, Pyranja & Sacha Korn, Schwarze Grütze, Sugarplum Fairy, Sunrise Avenue, Thomas Siffling Trio, Wallis Bird
- 2008: AKa Frontage, Fettes Brot, Irie Révoltés, KT Tunstall, Revolverheld, Róisín Murphy, Sportfreunde Stiller, Willy DeVille, The Beautiful Girls, Die Orsons, Tone, Louis Logic & DJ JJ Brown, Neaera, LéOparleur, Jonah Matranga
- 2009: Äl Jawala, Blue King Brown, Perry O'Parson, Callejon, Culcha Candela, Farin Urlaub Racing Team, Irie Révoltés, Peter Fox, Pop Shock, Rainer von Vielen, Roy Paci, Schandmaul, Snowgoons, Tina Dico, Zion I, This Will Destroy You, Damnasty
- 2010: Mareefield, Sonic Avalanche, Miss Platnum, Jan Delay, Centermay, Stanfour, Bela B, Editors, Monsters of Liedermaching, Le Grand Uff Zaque, Charlie Winston, John Butler Trio, Gentleman, War from a Harlots Mouth, Kaishakunin, Pitchtuner, Jessie Evans, Nosliw, figli di madre ignota, Casper
- 2011: Wir sind Helden, Clueso, Razorlight, Huecco, Bad Religion, Aura Dione, Skunk Anansie, Van Canto, Damion Davis, Jamaram, Your Demise, Sondaschule, Rocky Votolato, Mono, Ohrbooten, Jan Wittmer
- 2012: StereoDrama, Trombone Shorty, Deichkind, Donots, Maxïmo Park, Casper, Culcha Candela, Monsters of Liedermaching, Aphroe, Transmitter, Deez Nuts, Flo Mega, Urlaub in Polen, Moop Mama, Most Wanted Monster, Otto Normal, P-Vers & Claudio
- 2013: Seeed, Sportfreunde Stiller, Söhne Mannheims, Kettcar, Gentleman, Bosse, Leslie Clio, Kellerkommando, Triggerfinger, Blumio, Lingua Loca, Gasmac Gilmore, Mumuvitch Disko Orkestar, Sea + Air, Reptile Youth
- 2014: The BossHoss, Madsen, Patrice, Coely, Silla (Rapper), Nicolas Sturm, Bury Tomorrow, Soul Sister Dance Revolution, Volxtanz, Abby, Mighty Oaks, Zaz, Jupiter Jones, Mad Caddies
- 2015: Clueso, Endeffekt, Alles Wegen Günther, Heisskalt, Thees Uhlmann, Moop Mama, La Petite Rouge, Mats Heili], Razz, Selig, The Subways, The Kooks, Roo Panes, Rio Reiser – König von Deutschland (Badisches Staatstheater), Joris, Fish, AnnenMayKantereit, Jay Ryze, 913, David Floyd, Curlyman, Lumaraa, Azad, Sea Time, Vision, The Lioncloud, Any Given Day, Raketkanon, Skip & Die, Die Goodmäns, Left Thumb Up, Die Nerven, Astroid Boys, GODS, Fritz Kalkbrenner
- 2016: Rea Garvey, Fettes Brot, Element of Crime, Wanda, Milky Chance, Von Brücken, Moop Mama, William Fitzsimmons, Mother Tongue, Dellé, Django 300], Razz, Max Giesinger, Timothy Auld, Joey Voodoo, Novaa, Runway Lights, In Haze, Voodoo Kiss, Mats Heilig, The Lytics, Laas Unltd, YAST, The Bazzookas, Kofelgschroa, FùGù Mango
- 2017: Sportfreunde Stiller, Sido, Amy Macdonald, Donots, Jennifer Rostock, Meute, Drangsal, Zebrahead, Feine Sahne Fischfilet, Äl Jawala, Himmelblau, Reaching 62F, All Haze Red, Thomas Siffling Flow, Lotte, Henning Wehland, LaBrassBanda, Mars of Illyricum, Astronautalis, Curse, Brothers of Santa Claus, Finding Harbours, Resistance, Grizzly, Mother's Cake, The Hirsch Effekt, Django S., Hackmann & Brezmann, The Fantastic Nine, Crimson Shore, Down with the Gypsies, Me + Marie, Wallis Bird
- 2018: Mando Diao, Marteria, Simple Minds, Bosse, Gloria, Von Wegen Lisbeth, Olli Schulz, Tonbandgerät, Airwood
- 2019: Gentleman, Max Giesinger, Fettes Brot, Querbeat, Alma, Kelvin Jones, Kettcar, Rival Sons, Grossstadtgeflüster, Aurora, Cobra Express, Faber, Kat Frankie, Barns Courtney
- 2022: Seeed, Jan Delay & Disko No.1, Bilderbuch, Passenger, Flogging Molly, Roy Bianco & Die Abbrunzati Boys, Alice Merton
- 2023: Alligatooth, Rea Garvey, Casper, Alvaro Soler, Freya Ridings, Leoniden, Michael Schulte, Querbeat, Vintage Trouble
- 2024: Peter Fox, LEA, Nina Chuba, Bosse, Tones And I, Wolfmother, OK Kid, Sportfreunde Stiller, GReeeN Megaloh
- 2025: 01099, Faithless, Clueso, Max Giesinger & Friends, Amy Macdonald, Grossstadtgefluster, Zoe Wees
