= Gypsy Rose =

Gypsy Rose may refer to:

- Gypsy Rose Lee (1911–1970), American burlesque entertainer and vedette
- Gypsy-Rose Blanchard (born 1991), American woman convicted of second-degree murder of her mother in 2015
- Gypsy Rose, famous lowrider owned by Jesse Valadez
