= Bon Voyage (Deichkind song) =

Single by Deichkind featuring Nina Tenge

from the album Bitte ziehen Sie durch
- Released: 8 May 2000
- Recorded: 1999
- Genre: Hip hop
- Length: 3:28 (radio edit); 5:24 (extended mix)
- Label: WEA; Showdown Records
- Songwriter(s): Philipp Grütering; Bartosch Jeznach; Malte Pittner; Nina Tenge
- Producer(s): Sebastian Hackert; Malte Pittner

Deichkind singles chronology
"Bon Voyage" (2000)	"Weit weg!" (2000)

Nina singles chronology
"Scheiß drauf" (1998)	"Bon Voyage" (2000)	"Doppel X Chromosom" (2000)

Music video
- "Bon Voyage" on YouTube

"Bon Voyage" is the first single from the debut studio album Bitte ziehen Sie durch, by the Hamburg hip hop and electropunk band Deichkind, in cooperation with the German rapper Nina Tenge. It was the first single ever by the band.

== Videos ==
=== Music video ===
The music video shows Deichkind, Nina, some cheerleaders and some car hydraulics in front of a white background rapping the song.

=== Lyric video ===
The lyric video shows the words "Bon Voyage" on a black screen, changing its colours.

== Track listing ==
- Digital download – radio edit
1. "Bon Voyage" (radio edit) – 3:28
- Digital download – extended
1. "Bon Voyage" (extended mix) – 5:24
- CD single
1. "Bon Voyage" (radio edit) – 3:28
2. "Bon Voyage" (C.L.A.S. remix) – 5:31
3. "Evergreens" (album version) – 4:16
4. "Bon Voyage" (Instrumental) – 3:23

== Charts ==
Chart (2000)	Position
Austria (Ö3 Austria Top 40)	6
Germany (GfK)	11
Switzerland (Schweizer Hitparade)	61
