= Max Rieger =

Max Rieger may refer to:

- Max Rieger (soccer player) (1904–1989), German soccer player
- Max Rieger (skier) (born 1946), German alpine skier
- Max Rieger (musician) (born 1993), German singer-songwriter, musician and producer

== See also ==
- Maximilian Rieger (1828–1909), German germanist and historian
