= Willy Chavarria =

American fashion designer (born 1967)

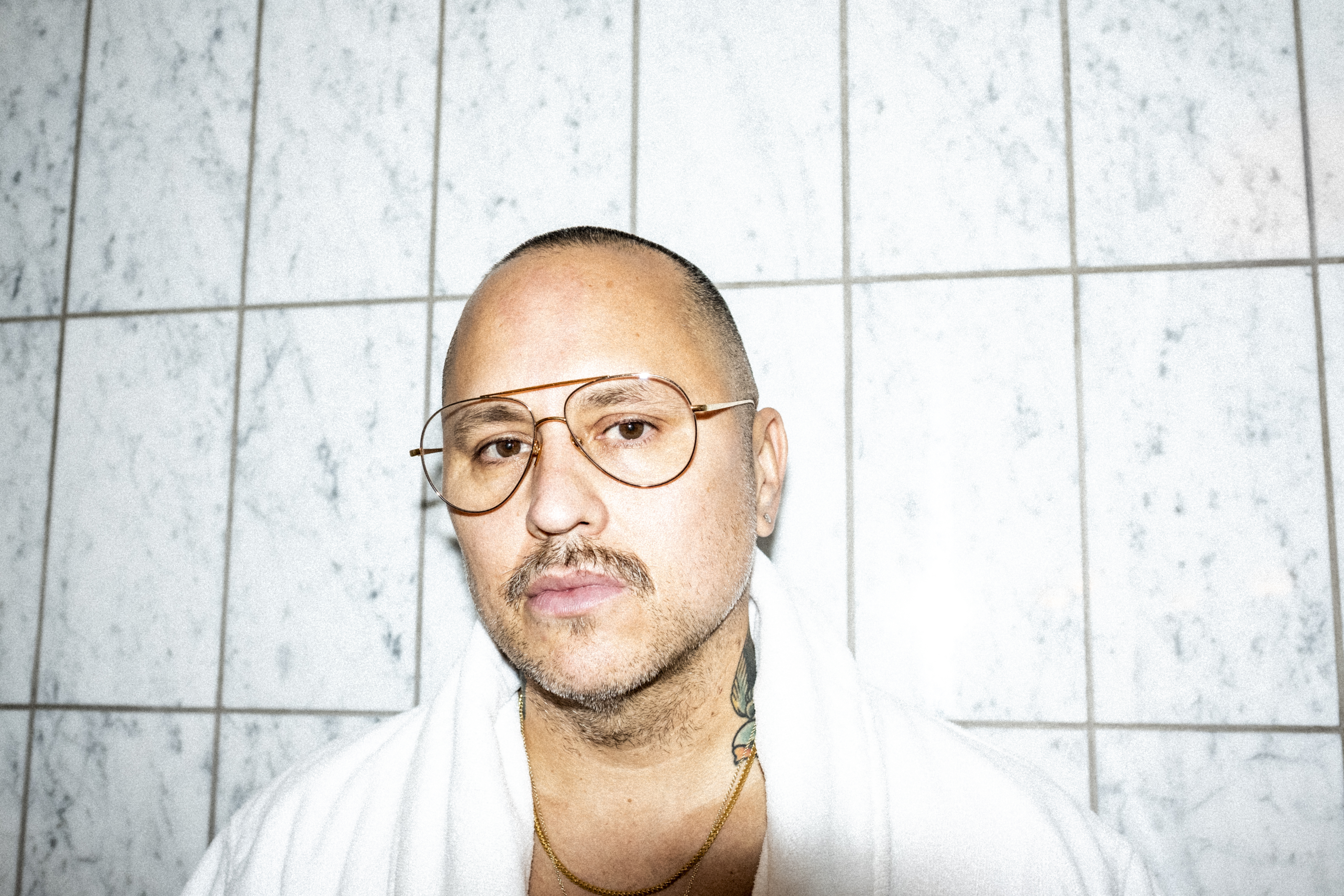
- Born: William Chavarria; 1967 (age 58–59); Huron, California, U.S.
- Education: Academy of Art University
- Occupation: Fashion designer
- Years active: 1999–present
- Label: Willy Chavarria
- Awards: Cooper Hewitt National Design Award (2022); CFDA Menswear Designer of the Year (2023, 2024)

William "Willy" Chavarria is an American fashion designer born in Huron, California. He is the founder and Chief Creative Officer of his eponymous label (stylized as WILLY CHAVARRIA), and previously served as the Senior Vice President of Design at Calvin Klein until 2024. He is also the founder and Creative Director of Palmer Trading Company, a New York-based menswear label sold exclusively in Japan. In 2025, Time magazine listed him as one of the world's 100 most influential people.

== Early life and education ==
Chavarria was born to an Irish-American mother and a Mexican-American father in July 1967. He attended Redwood High School in Visalia, California. In his early 20s, he attended the Academy of Art University in San Francisco to pursue a degree in graphic design. During his time in school, he found part-time employment at Joe Boxer, working in the shipping department.

== Career ==
=== Early beginnings ===
During his employment at the Joe Boxer shipping department, Chavarria would spend time after hours working on sketches and designs. This work secured him an internship with Nicholas Graham at Joe Boxer, which developed into a designer role for the company. After taking an interest in athletics and personal training, he took a designer role at Voler, a cycling and multi-sport apparel company. At this time, Ralph Lauren was forming a diffusion line for cycling apparel named RLX, and through a collaboration with Voler, Chavarria was hired to work on this new line in 1999.

=== Palmer Trading Company ===
In November 2010, Chavarria and David Ramirez opened Palmer Trading Company as co-owners in New York City. The menswear store carried both vintage goods and contemporary pieces that complemented its Americana aesthetic. The store's in-house label was also sold to retailers globally, including Journal Standard Relume, Steven Alan, and Opening Ceremony. In 2015, the store collaborated with footwear manufacturer Viberg on an ankle-height derby boot.

=== Willy Chavarria (eponymous label) ===
==== Brand history ====
He launched his eponymous label in 2015, and "from his casting to his designs, Mexican American designer Willy Chavarria has always knitted politics into fashion, and fought to see beauty where it is rarely recognized." Since then, his collection has been stocked at prestigious retailers worldwide, including Barneys, Dover Street Market, Browns, and others.

Chavarria became known for his distinct interpretation of men's fashion, mixing race, politics, and sexuality into graceful and elegant apparel. He was one of the first New York designers to cast only models of color and used his shows for political expression.

In 2018, he showed his Spring/Summer collection at the Eagle Bar in New York City, juxtaposing religion, lowrider, and leather bar influences. Pulitzer Prize-winning journalist Robin Givhan noted that Willy "produces some of the most socially engaging runway shows in New York." Vogue contributor Nick Remsen wrote that "Chavarria is a smart, worldly creative who knows how to be all-inclusive while still carving out his own distinct M.O."

For his Spring/Summer 2019 collection, Chavarria collaborated with sportswear brand Hummel. The collection referenced late 1990s and early 2000s streetwear in New York City, incorporating skyline graphics, inspirations from brands like Ralph Lauren and Calvin Klein, and inverted American flag prints. His work from this season was later featured in the Metropolitan Museum of Art's exhibition "In America: A Lexicon of Fashion."

Chavarria's Fall 2020 collection included sustainable materials in collaboration with textile manufacturer Recyctex, reusing discarded fabric waste. His Spring 2022 runway show featured his signature oversized silhouettes, subversive takes on masculinity, and roots in Chicano subculture. Of the collection, he stated: "I wanted it to feel like couture, to feel regal... and then to shift that against the toughness of New York." He also emphasized a made-to-order model to reduce fashion waste.

In 2023, Teen Angels stated that a collaboration between Chavarria and PacSun used a cover image from the magazine without permission.

During 2024, Chavarria began extending the label into additional product categories. He introduced a small range of black bags and developed a footwear collaboration with the American shoemaker Allen Edmonds, using prototypes from the project in his New York runway presentation. The expansion was financed without a conventional advertising budget, with sponsors contributing to the cost of the show and an accompanying short film directed by Chavarria.

Willy Chavarria's Spring/Summer 2024 show was highly acclaimed with Harper's Bazaar commenting that "[the collection] had charisma, charm, and also something hugely important (though not often touted by the industry), which can often be distinctive of New York fashion: heart." The brand debuted the Willy Chavarria x Adidas collaboration at their Spring Summer 2025 show. The collection featured high-fashion jerseys, ruffly performance tops, tracksuits, tiny running shorts, knee-high socks, and Willy Chavarria's take on the classic Adidas Jabbar sneakers.

In January 2025, Chavarria made his debut at Paris Fashion Week with his Fall/Winter 2025 collection, titled "Tarantula", marking the tenth anniversary of his label. The show took place at the American Cathedral in Paris and featured his voluminous tailoring in fabrics such as velvet and silk. The collection included collaborative looks with Adidas and appearances by models including Indya Moore and Paloma Elsesser. During the finale, a recorded sermon by Episcopal Bishop Mariann Edgar Budde calling for compassion for LGBTQ people and immigrants was played. In August of 2025, Chavarria planned to release a huarache-style sandal as part of his collaboration with Adidas. The design drew criticism, including from Mexican President Claudia Sheinbaum who said that "big companies often take products, ideas and designs from Indigenous communities" and that the government was considering legal action. In statements to BBC News, Chavarria said "I am deeply sorry that the shoe was appropriated in this design and not developed in direct and meaningful partnership with the Oaxacan community", and Adidas said it contacted Oaxacan officials about "restitution to the people who were plagiarised".

Chavarria presented his autumn/winter 2026 collection, titled "Eterno", at the Dojo de Paris during Paris Fashion Week. The presentation combined a runway show with theatrical staging and live musical performances, including appearances by Mon Laferte, Lunay (singer) and Santos Bravos. The set recreated a New York street intersection, with models walking among the performers. The Simultaneously he introduced a sub label Big Willy, a permanent collection of everyday clothing, including chinos, workwear shirts, bomber jackets and coach jackets. He showed his spring/summer 2027 collection at the former French Communist Party headquarters in Paris.

==== Ownership and investments ====
In 2024, Willy Chavarria's label received funding from FAE Fashion Ventures, the investment arm of First Access Entertainment; the investment was not publicly announced at the time. Latter in 2025, Chalhoub Group acquired a minority stake in the brand for an undisclosed amount. The investments were intended to strengthen the company's infrastructure and support international retail expansion, including in Europe and Asia.

== Awards and nominations ==
- Woolmark Prize, Finalist, 2019
- National Award for Fashion Design, Winner, 2022
- Cooper Hewitt National Design Award, Winner, 2022
- Latin American Fashion Awards (LAFA) Designer of the Year, Winner, 2023; 2025
- CFDA American Menswear Designer of the Year, Winner, 2024; 2023; Nominated, 2019; 2025
- Time 100 Most Influential People, 2025
- ACLU NYCLU Liberty Award, Winner, 2025
- ANDAM Fashion Awards, Finalist, 2025
- WWD Honors Menswear Designer of the Year, Winner, 2025
- The Fashion Awards Designer of the Year, Nominated, 2025

== Notable works ==
- Creative consultant for Yeezy Gap
- Collaboration with Danish brand Hummel in 2018
- Collaboration with Danish workwear brand KANSAS in 2019
- "Falling Stars" sweater, 2019
- K-Swiss collaborative footwear, 2020
- Dickies collaboration for Willy Chavarria Fall 2022 menswear show "UNCUT"

== Personal life ==
Chavarria is openly gay.
