= DJ Tranzo =

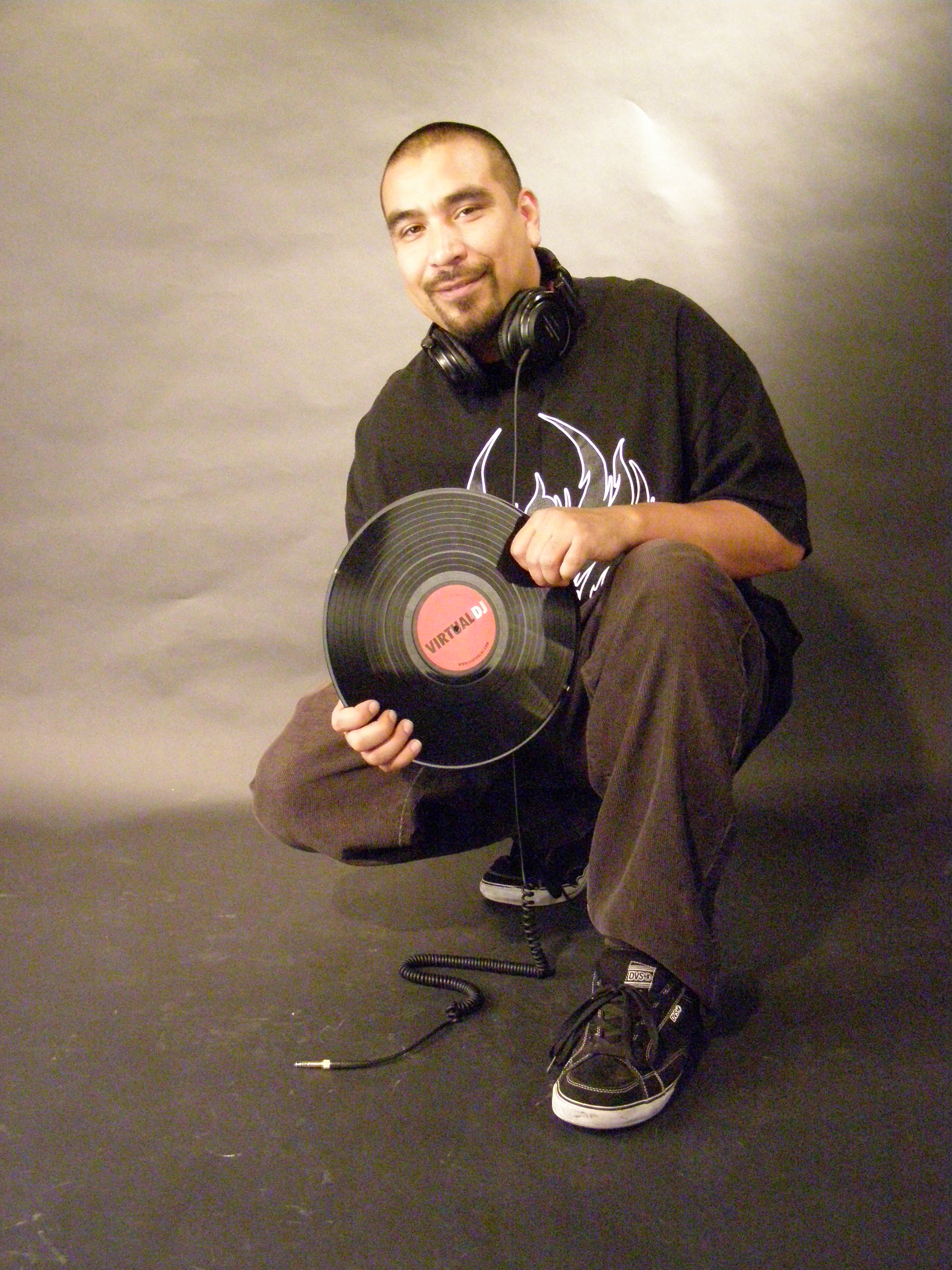
- DJ Tranzo in 2008

Background information
- Born: Phoenix, Arizona, U.S.
- Genres: Hip hop, House, EDM, Latin, Nu-Funk, Tecnocumbia
- Occupations: DJ, musician
- Years active: 1994–present
- Label: Krown Entertainment

DJ Tranzo is an underground Chicano disc jockey and emcee from Phoenix, Arizona who started his career in 1994 playing house parties and local events. He is the brother of local cholo rapper MC Bener One, who also started his career in 1994. Tranzo produced Bener One's notable tracks "Best of the Best" and "Shake Ur Rearview" in 2008. The latter was featured on Bener One's Hip Hop Cholo Vol. 1. Tranzo is signed to local Phoenix label Krown Entertainment.

Tranzo played at the Arizona Super Show for Lowrider Magazine in 2008. In 2010, Tranzo was nominated for "Top Phoenix Hip hop DJ" at the 2010 Online Hip-Hop Awards. In 2019, he played at the Phoenix's Winter Wonderland show co-sponsored by local businesses. Tranzo is an active DJ and did live shows on tour in early 2020 prior to the COVID-19 pandemic in the United States. Since then, he has posted new mixes on his YouTube channel.
