= Homie Rollerz =

2008 kart racing game

- Official box art, depicting different Homies character driving karts
- Developer: Webfoot Technologies
- Publisher: Destineer
- Director: Peter Anthony Chiodo
- Producer: Dave Degnan
- Designer: Jim Grant
- Programmers: Jeffrey Lim; David Lannan; Matt Pellegrini
- Artist: Jim Grant
- Composer: Yannis Brown
- Platform: Nintendo DS
- Release: USA: March 5, 2008
- Genre: Kart racing
- Modes: Single-player, multiplayer

Homie Rollerz is a 2008 kart racing game developed by Webfoot Technologies and published by Destineer for the Nintendo DS. The game is based on the plastic figurine line Homies by American cartoonist David Gonzales, and follows ten different characters from the figurine line racing each other in a competition set up by an elderly man named Vato Wizard, who has the ability to grant wishes.

Homie Rollerz was received generally negatively by critics, and has been one of the lowest-rated games on review aggregator Metacritic. The game was criticized for its difficulty, and have described the game as having poor game design and derivative content.

== Gameplay ==
A typical race in the game, showing the player in second place.

Homie Rollerz is a kart racing game where the player plays as one of ten different selectable Homies characters in several race tracks, based on the Homies universe. Each character has a unique vehicle, with further customization options being purchasable with "respect points", the game's currency, obtained by performing tricks and winning races.

The game's main mode is called Wizard Circuit, where the different Homies characters race in a competition set up by Vato Wizard, who promises to grant a single wish to whoever wins the cup. To progress through the mode, players must place first in a series of races. The game also has a multiplayer mode that supports up to eight players via a local wireless connection, although multiplayer with up to four players was also possible with the Nintendo Wi-Fi Connection.

== Development and release ==
Homie Rollerz was developed by American video game developer Webfoot Technologies, in partnership with cartoonist David Gonzales. In an interview with Destructoid, Gonzales stated that he had been attempting for years to find a publisher with faith in the idea of a video game based on the Homies figurine line. Eventually, Gonzales found Destineer, with who he would begin working with shortly thereafter.

Homie Rollerz was first showcased at PAX 2007, along with a playable early version of the game. The game was initially intended to release in fall of 2007, although it was delayed until January 2008, then delayed again till February 27, and then delayed again to March 5. The game released exclusively in the United States.

== Reception ==
Reception

Aggregate score
Aggregator	Score
Metacritic	23/100

Review scores
Publication	Score
GamesRadar+	0.5/5
IGN	2/10
Nintendo World Report	1.5/10

Homie Rollerz received "generally unfavorable reviews" according to review aggregator Metacritic, where it was the 17th lowest-rated game in January 2019, with a Metascore of 23/100. GamesRadar named Homie Rollerz the worst Nintendo DS game of 2008, calling it an "unfinished catastrophe".

Critics have described the game as derivative, especially of Mario Kart, and have criticized the controls due to a lack of precision. Jack DeVries of IGN wrote that the game controls "with less precision than a shopping cart with three missing wheels". Nintendo World Report mirrored DeVries criticisms, calling the controls "jerky and disorrienting". Critics have also disliked the game's camera, which has been criticized for shifting with all of the player's turns.

Homie Rollerz has been frequently criticized for its "ridiculous level of difficulty". Zachary Miller of Nintendo World Report noted the game's difficulty as one of its most disappointing aspects, due to the player's AI opponents being able to make sharper turns, in addition to criticizing the game's low draw distance, which made it harder for the player to memorize and read track layouts.
