= Nina Tenge =

German rapper

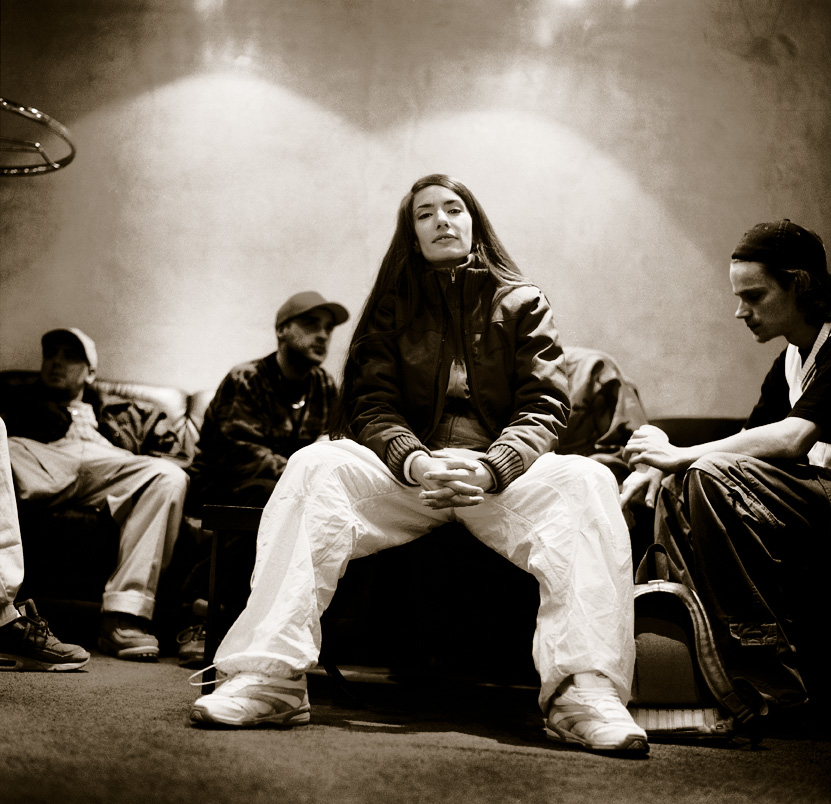
Nina MC in 2001

Nina Tenge (born 6 April 1974 in Hamburg), also known under her stage names Nina and Nina MC, is a German former rapper and artist.

== Life and work ==
Tenge was born to father Rahman Nadjafi, an Afghan teacher and activist, and mother Verena Tenge, a eurythmist.

Nina Tenge gained stage experience in hip-hop clubs in Hamburg. In 2000 she became increasingly known by collaborating with Deichkind's hit single Bon Voyage. In 2001 her solo single Doppel X Chromosome gained widespread media attention. The Süddeutsche Zeitung named her "Germany's best rapper". The Goethe-Institut repeated this judgment on its website in 2005.

She entered the acting industry in 2003, playing guest roles in series and featured roles in films.

Outside of music and acting, she has been involved with her father in an association for reconstruction programmes in Afghanistan. She also trained in yoga and now works as a yoga teacher in Berlin.

== Discography ==
=== Albums ===
- Nikita, 2001

=== Singles ===
Title	Year	Album
"Bon Voyage" (with Deichkind)	2000	Non-album single
"Doppel X Chromosom"	2001	Nikita
"Scheiss drauf"	2001	Nikita
"Quelle"	2001	Nikita
"Arschzeit Baby" (with MC Ronin)	2004	Non-album single
"Wet & Dirty" (with Bushido)	2004	Non-album single
"Fuck You"	2006	Non-album single

== Filmography ==
- Adam & Eve (2003)
- Abgefahren (2004)
- Alarm für Cobra 11 – Die Autobahnpolizei (episode Das Versprechen)
- Die Weisheit der Wolken (2008)
