= Shizu Saldamando =

American installation artist

Shizu Saldamando (born 1978 in San Francisco, CA) is an American visual artist. Her work merges painting and collage (often using origami paper) in portraits that often deal with social constructs of identity and subcultures. Saldamando also works in video, installation and performance art. She has been featured in numerous exhibitions, has attained accolades like that of Wanlass Artist in Residence, and is a successful writer, tattoo artist, and social activist.

== Biography ==
Saldamando was born in 1978 to parents of Mexican-American and Japanese-American descent. She was raised in the Mission District of San Francisco. Her parents both appreciated artwork and were invested in social issues. As a teenager, Saldamando was influenced by publications like Teen Angels, which celebrated the popular Chicano aesthetics of the time, as well as the growing punk and cholo cultural movements. At this time she took advantage of artistic groups in San Francisco, like the Mission Cultural Center for Latino Arts. After graduating high school, Saldamando moved to Los Angeles and found there a community of like-aged individuals who celebrated Chicanismo and appreciated the British musical artists that she liked.

Saldamando spent her undergraduate years and earned her Bachelor of Arts at the University of California, Los Angeles School of Arts and Architecture. Saldamando received criticism towards her artwork in college, with one of her professors reportedly telling her, “‘Your work looks like 1980s Chicano art. It’s a dead movement. It’s over. Don’t ever go back.’” Despite this, Saldamando continued to incorporate Chicano iconography and cholo aesthetics in her pieces.

After completing her undergraduate degree, Saldamando was accepted into a managerial role at Self-Help Graphics (SHG) supported by the Getty Foundation’s Multicultural Undergraduate Internship Program. Additionally, Saldamando was accepted into SHG’s Professional Printmaking Program, a program which encouraged her to use her heritage as a major influence in her artwork. Saldamando eventually left this position, and went to school at the California Institute of the Arts for her MFA.

Saldamando has continued to make art using her mixed-media style, and also is a successful portrait tattoo artist. She was a resident artist at the Art Omi International Artist Colony in 2002. Saldamando has discussed art through writing, authoring such articles as “On Art and Connection”. She is also involved in her community, leading such artistic events as paper-craft workshops which bring awareness to the historical persecution of Japanese people through World War II era internment camps.

== Artistry ==
Saldamando's friends are usually the subject of her artworks. In order to capture their personalities and features, she photographs them candidly and works off these images to create portraits. In her artist statement, Saldamando says that "By exploring subculture through personal narrative and employing an eclectic mix of materials, I hope to disarm fixed hierarchical social and artistic constructs." In the same artist statement, she also clarifies that her focus on showcasing her friends (the majority of whom represent minority ethnic groups) functions to "...glorify everyday people who are often overlooked, yet whose existence is the embodiment and legacy of historical struggle." Many of the people that she depicts in her artwork embody punk or other underground aesthetics. One UC Riverside professor describes Saldamando's artwork as "...very L.A…It's that blend of punk-pop aesthetic with pretty Japanese-girl-craft, meticulous rendition combined with the laid-back posture of her subjects."

The mediums she uses are diverse, and include wooden surfaces and a variety of textiles. One of the materials that she is known for using in her pieces is Washi paper, a type of paper specific to some Japanese crafts. Furthermore, she has created many pieces which use common fabrics, like bedsheets, as drawing surfaces. She has worked in the genre of arte paño, a type of prison art involving portraits of family members and friends drawn in ball-point pen on napkins or handkerchiefs. Saldamando is also known for implementing stickers and gold foil in her portraiture.

== Selected exhibitions ==
In 2007, Saldamando launched an exhibition in Los Angeles’s Tropico de Nopal. This was her first stand alone exhibition, and featured not only some select portraits created using unconventional techniques and materials, but also “...two large-scale ballpoint pen drawings done on bedsheets and four colored-pencil drawings on paper.”

An exhibition which made Saldamando’s name more prominent in the art world was Phantom Sightings: Art After the Chicano Movement, which debuted in 2008 at the L.A. County Museum of Art. This installation featured some of her most novel works: her drawn-on handkerchiefs which reference paños made by incarcerated Chicanx individuals.

In 2011, Saldamando was featured in the Portraiture Now: Asian American Portraits of Encounter exhibition at the Smithsonian’s National Portrait Gallery, which focused on Asian-American identity. Her work Carm’s Crew was shown alongside the work of artists Hye Yeon Nam, Roger Shimomura, Satomi Shirai, Tam Tran and Zhang Chun Hong.

Saldmando's work was also shown in We Must Risk Delight: Twenty Artists from Los Angeles, curated by Elizabeta Betinski as an official collateral exhibition of the 56th Venice Biennale.

In 2016, Saldamando’s To Return exhibition premiered at the Charlie James Gallery. The exhibition consisted primarily of colored pencil portraits on wooden surfaces representing members of her social circle in Los Angeles.

In 2020, Saldamando contributed artwork to Self-Help Graphics’ Dia de los Muertos exhibition. Her piece for this show, titled When This is All Over, was inspired by the historical oppression of both Mexican and Japanese-American individuals. The piece is an ofrenda-style sculpture made out of a piece of metal fence adorned with Washi-paper flowers arranged in a geometric pattern, which mimics the pattern of fence links.

As a Wanlass Artist in Residence, Saldamando hosted a solo show, L.A. Intersections, at Oxy Arts in 2020. This show featured a plethora of her colorful wood panel portraits.

== Quotes ==
"A lot of what I try to capture are different subcultures or scenes in which people have created their own world outside of larger alienating constructs."

"My friends and I would buy Teen Angels, a magazine of lowrider and cholo art, and try to copy the drawings of Aztec pyramids and warriors and naked girls. I think that's how I got good at ballpoint pen renderings."

"Growing up in the Mission district in San Francisco, it was predominantly a hip-hop culture. Here in Los Angeles, I'd go to shows or house parties, and it would be all Latino kids listening to the Cure and the Smiths. In L.A., I felt normal for the first time."
