= Tim Bruening =

German photographer & artist (born 1983)

Tim Bruening (born 1983) is a German photographer and artist. He lives in Hamburg and Berlin.

== Life and work ==
Bruening was born in Hannover, Lower Saxony during 1983.

In his diverse body of work, Tim Bruening blurs the line between documentation and fiction. His photographs incorporate influences from pop culture, fashion and politics, as well as cinematic fantasies and everyday situations. His range extends from portraits of prominent figures such as politicians, musicians and filmmakers, to abstract experiments, still lifes and socially critical commentaries.

=== Artistic work ===
His first institutional solo exhibition titled "COMEBACK" opened at the Horst-Janssen-Museum in Oldenburg in September 2021 and included almost two hundred photographs, several video installations and a spatial installation. In "COMEBACK" individual groups of works coalesced into cinematic collages, with portraits of actors and actresses such as Nicolas Cage, Deborah Kara Unger, Bella Thorne, Paz de la Huerta and Amanda Plummer corresponding with landscapes that were sometimes concrete and sometimes abstract, creating entirely unique interpretations that questioned conventional viewing patterns and encouraged the viewer to adopt new perspectives. The photographs oscillated between appearance and reality, play and authenticity, the role and the private person, showcasing the allure of the film industry and the value of the stories of its protagonists. A particular highlight: Bruening's then 87-year-old grandmother Elsbeth, who lovingly dressed up as characters such as Bela Lugosi's Dracula, Uma Thurman's The Bride in Kill Bill or Joaquin Phoenix's Joker. The video installations presented interviews with Hollywood stars such as Sandra Hüller, Malcolm McDowell, Bruce Dern and Danny Trejo, who gave statements or even personal greetings on the successful comeback, humorously questioning authenticity.

In 2023 Tim Bruening presented a large-scale collage of photographs, photocopies and WhatsApp chat histories with the actress Laura Tonke in the solo exhibition "I've been up all night waiting for you to come home" which provided a deep insight into the long-standing friendship between the actress and the artist.

Also in 2023 the artist's photographic series "Beluga" was shown for the first time at the Kunstverein Jesteburg. The series focuses on the Airbus A300-600ST and A330-700L ("Beluga XL") cargo planes, whose distinctive shape resembles the eponymous beluga whale. The compositional freedom of the series is striking. The selection is not limited to the sober documentation of an industrial monument, as found in the serial photography of Bernd and Hilla Becher and the Düsseldorf School. The relationship to the subject is more emotional, building a narrative and contextualizing the Beluga. The photographs are more of a social study and can be compared to the photography of Martin Parr, as the series references flight behavior and situates the Beluga within its socio-economic context as an important element in Airbus's intra-European production and trade activities, without losing its unique charm.

In addition to his exhibitions, Bruening has published numerous artist books and zines, directed short films, a documentary, and several music videos.

=== Commercial and editorial work ===
Bruening has worked with renowned magazines such as Purple Fashion Magazine, Interview, GQ, L’Officiel Hommes, Zeit Magazin, Der Spiegel, and Vice, as well as with fashion brands like Dior, Adidas, Converse, and others.

Bruening has photographed numerous musicians for album and single covers such as Bosse, Tell A Vision and Deichkind, as well as for editorial projects and magazines such as FKA Twigs, Thurston Moore, Pete Doherty, Soko, Alice Merton and Wanda. Most recently he was also responsible for the album cover of Live im Elfenbeinturm for the German band Die Nerven. Since 2015, there has been an ongoing artistic collaboration between Tim Bruening and the band Deichkind, which includes covers, promotional campaigns, tours, live performances, and music video shoots.

In 2014 Das Wetter magazine published an issue in which all the photographs were taken by Bruening.

From 2016 to 2017 Bruening, together with the German-Iranian television presenter and journalist Michel Abdollahi, maintained a monthly column in NEON magazine published by Gruner + Jahr, which addressed socially relevant and political topics such as racism, elections, Brexit, Trump and conspiracy theories.

In 2025 Tim Bruening accompanied the then vice chancellor Robert Habeck during the election campaign for the 21st German federal election for Der Spiegel magazine.

== Exhibitions (selection) ==
- 2025: Vernissage (Exhibition on Punk), Galerie Kai Erdmann, Berlin, Germany (Group exhibition)
- 2024: Shaped by time, The Space, Hamburg, Germany (Group exhibition)
- 2023: Château Bleu Art Prize, Château Bleu, Hamburg, Germany (Group exhibition)
- 2023: Transitions IV – Running Moon, Raum linksrechts, Hamburg, Germany (Group exhibition)
- 2023: Beluga, Kunstverein Jesteburg, Jesteburg, Germany (Solo exhibition)
- 2023: I’ve been up all night waiting for you to come home, Studio45, Hamburg, Germany (Solo exhibition)
- 2022: The moon and the sun they both meet in my eyes, Studio45, Hamburg, Germany (Solo exhibition)
- 2022: I want my money back, Island, Hamburg, Germany (Solo exhibition)
- 2022: Current Currents Currency, Raum Links Rechts, Hamburg, Germany (Group exhibition)
- 2021: COMEBACK, Horst-Janssen-Museum, Oldenburg, Germany (Solo exhibition)
- 2020: The World is Whole, Galerie Melike Bilir, Hamburg, Germany (Group exhibition)
- 2019: 99 Skies, HelloMe, Berlin, Germany (Solo exhibition)
- 2019: Beautiful Memory Desserts, Ame Nue, Hamburg, Germany (Solo exhibition)
- 2018: Charity, Neuer Aachener Kunstverein, Aachen, Germany (Group exhibition)
- 2018: Goodbye Blue Sky, Ame Nue, Hamburg, Germany (Group exhibition)
- 2018: I guess I took one look at you and forgot the rest, Ame Nue, Hamburg, Germany (Solo exhibition)
- 2018: Toy Bitches, Fuck you, Galerie Kai Erdmann, Hamburg, Germany (Group exhibition)
- 2018: The New Mona Lisa, Galerie Melike Bilir, Hamburg, Germany (Group exhibition)
- 2017: Deichtorhallen Annual Gifts, Deichtorhallen, Hamburg, Germany (Group exhibition)
- 2017: Castello Di Lajone, Alessandria, Italy (Group exhibition)
- 2017: Soirée graphique, Komet, Bern, Switzerland (Group exhibition)
- 2017: Sunset Foot Clinic, Ame Nue, Hamburg, Germany (with Stefan Marx)
- 2016: Multiples, Galerie Kai Erdmann, Hamburg, Germany (Group exhibition)
- 2016: Untitled 2, Galerie Warhus Ritterhaus, Cologne, Germany (Group exhibition)
- 2016: Like God in France, Ame Nue, Hamburg, Germany (Solo exhibition)
- 2015: But Otherwise Everything's Fine, Galerie 21, Hamburg, Germany (Group exhibition)
- 2015: For the Sake of Posterity, Galerie Hinterconti, Hamburg, Germany (Solo exhibition)
- 2014: TISSUE Ultra IV, Paris, France (Group exhibition)
- 2014: TISSUE Ultra III, Milan, Italy (Group exhibition)
- 2014: Until Someone Cries, Hamburg, Germany (with Robin Hinsch)
- 2013: I Knew Him When He Was Still Cool!, Island, Hamburg, Germany (Solo exhibition)

== Monographs, catalogs and artist books (selection) ==
- 2025: Get the fuck off my spaceship (with Logan Polish)
- 2024: It's not really my problem if they think I'm weird
- 2024: I'm too old for this shit, kill me while I'm young
- 2021: Tim Bruening's COMEBACK, ISBN 978-3-00-069989-4
- 2020: Difficult times, magnificent skies
- 2019: 99 Skies ISBN 978-3-948338-02-2
- 2019: Still Lifes
- 2019: All my friends are dead
- 2019: Arriba España
- 2018: LA (with Stefan Marx)
- 2016: Like God in France
- 2015: For this little bit of posterity
- 2014: German Punk
- 2012: Black Heaven

== Performances ==
- 2017: All my friends were at G20..., Hamburg, Germany (with Robin Hinsch & Charlotte Gosch)
- 2014: Tim Bruening eating fries, Munich, Germany
- 2013: For each like, Hamburg, Germany (with René Haustein)
