= Max Rieger (musician) =

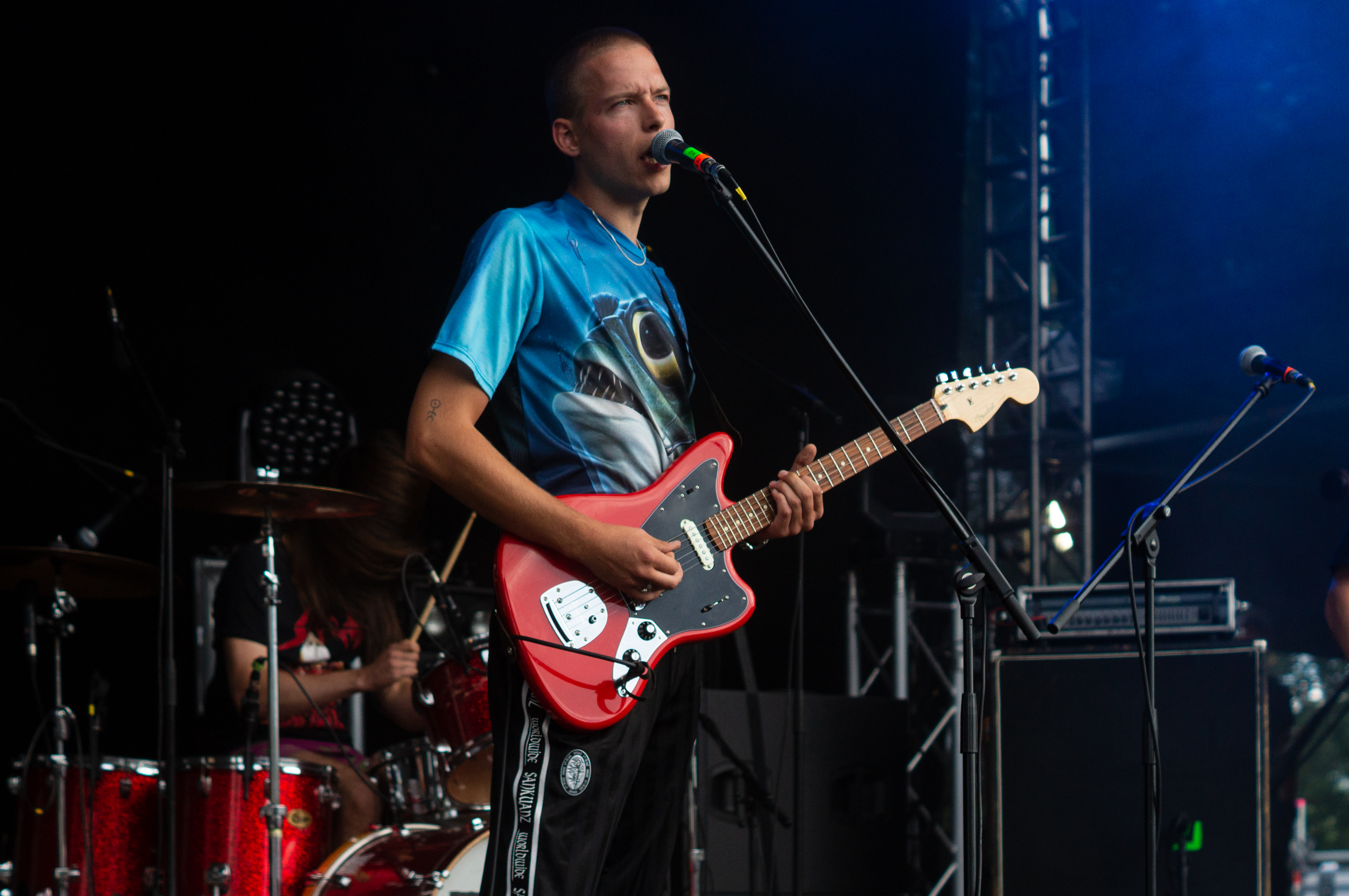
Max Rieger with Die Nerven at the Kosmonaut Festival in July 2019

Max Rieger (born 10 February 1993) is a German singer-songwriter, musician and producer. He is the singer and guitarist of the post-punk noise-rock band Die Nerven (English: "The nerves").

Rieger comes from near Stuttgart and attended the Gymnasium Plochingen and the Max-Eyth-Schule in Stuttgart. As a teenager, he taught himself to play the guitar. At the beginning of 2010, together with Julian Knoth, he founded the band Die Nerven in Esslingen am Neckar. The band had its breakthrough in 2014. At the end of 2010, Rieger was involved in the founding of the electro-wave band Die Selektion. In 2012, he left the band to concentrate on Die Nerven. He has released five drone-, wave- and noise-oriented solo albums under the pseudonym All Diese Gewalt (Kein Punkt wird mehr fixiert (2014), Welt in Klammern (2016), Welt in Klammern (Addendum) (2017), Andere (2020) and Alles ist nur Übergang (2023)). Andere is his first solo project in collaboration with Glitterhouse Records. He is also part of the experimental trio Jauche and releases black metal under his pseudonym Obstler. He also works as a music producer for various bands including Casper, Drangsal, Friends of Gas, Ilgen-Nur and Karies.

Rieger lives in Berlin, after having lived in Leipzig for a while.
