= Jesse Valadez =

Mexican American lowrider (1946–2011)

Jesse Valadez was a Mexican American lowrider and artist based in East Los Angeles who became known as a major figure in lowriding, a cultural practice among Chicanos that he helped pioneer. He was a founding member of the Imperials car club and designed the famous Gypsy Rose lowrider in the 1970s, which went on to make international waves for lowrider culture, boosted by its feature on the show Chico and the Man.

In 1997, Valadez passed the Gypsy Rose down to his son, Jesse Valadez Jr. or "Little Jesse," who became a notable second-generation lowrider. Valadez died in 2011. His son died in 2019. The Gypsy Rose of the Valadez family was the first lowrider ever to be inducted into the Historic Vehicle Association and is now housed at the Petersen Automotive Museum.

== History ==
He was born in Nueva Rosita, Coahuila, Mexico in 1946, before immigrating to Texas in 1959. Two years later, Valadez moved to Los Angeles, California. He opened an upholstery and auto shop shortly after in the city of Garden Grove.

=== Lowrider construction ===
Valadez constructed three lowriders in his lifetime, all of which he named Gypsy Rose. The first Gypsy Rose was a 1960 Chevrolet Impala that he painted a simple flashy pink, thinking of the burlesque dancer Gypsy Rose Lee. In 1964, he founded the Imperials car club with his brother Armando. He was part of the lowrider cruising scene in East Los Angeles and wanted the Imperials club to represent the city well.

==== 1968 Gypsy Rose ====
His second was another Impala that would become the predecessor to the famous Gypsy Rose lowrider. On this car, he hand-painted roses to honor his mother "because she liked flowers" and she "loved the idea of putting roses on the car." This second Gypsy Rose car made its debut on the lowrider scene at the 1968 Winternationals Custom Show. At first, some of his fellow lowriders from other car clubs were critical of the design. A veteran recalled "They used to dog on him like, 'How can you put effin' roses on your car, man?'"

In 1972, this car made the front page of Car Craft magazine, which expanded its notoriety. However, it was destroyed shortly after from members of a rival car club in El Monte, after the Imperials reportedly hosted an event in their neighborhood without consultation.

==== 1974 Gypsy Rose ====
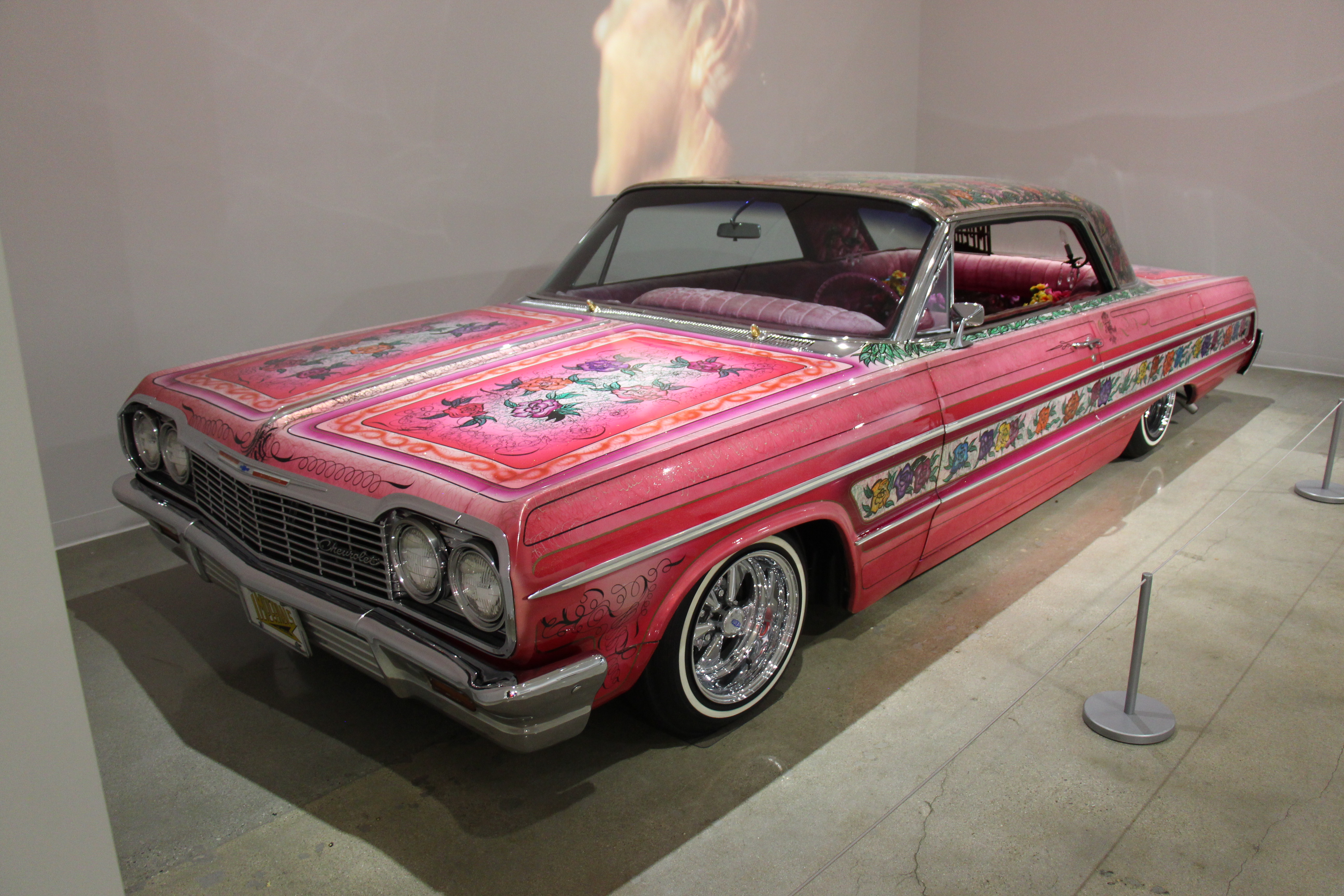
The famous Gypsy Rose was Valadez's third lowrider build.

After the previous car's destruction, Valadez decided to build a third Gypsy Rose car with another flower design, which made its debut in 1974. Valadez created the concept and design and Walter Prey, a custom car legend, helped bring his vision to life. Prey also worked with painter Don Heckman. While his second car featured 72 flowers, the lasting Gypsy Rose featured 115 flowers. Valadez's older brother, Gil, did all of the upholstery work on the car in a matching velvet color, along with its extra aesthetic features.

That same year, Freddie Prinze, who was the star of Chico and the Man (1974–1978) insisted that the car and Valadez be featured in the opening sequence of the show, which resulted in its widespread recognition. When funk band War came out with their song "Low Rider" in 1975, the Imperials car club was reportedly the first to hear it. Hydraulic suspension was added to the car some years later.

In 1997, Valadez passed the car on to his son. Valadez Jr. admitted he was scared to take on such a responsibility, but recalled the words of his father: "He always said, 'Have fun with the car.'" In 2007, Valadez received the Lifetime Contributor Award from Lowrider Magazine. The car was shown at the Petersen Automotive Museum in 2008.

== Death ==
Valadez died in January 2011 at the age of 64. His funeral was in East Los Angeles and was attended by his many loved ones. After his death, the car was put on display at The Mall, Washington, D.C., where his son spoke about the car.

His son, Valadez Jr., died in 2019, at the age of 45. His funeral was also attended by his many loved ones as well as lowrider fans both nationally and internationally.
