= Homies (toy) =

Series of small toy figurines

- Three Homies figurines: Fat Boy (front), Wanderer (left), and Duckyboy (right)
- Type: Figurines
- Invented by: David Gonzales
- Company: HomieShop LLC
- Country: United States
- Availability: 1998–Present
- Materials: Plastic

Homies are a series of two-inch plastic collectible figurines representing various Chicano Mexican American characters. The line of toys was created by David Gonzales and based on a comic strip that Gonzales created featuring a cast of characters from his youth. Introduced in the year 1998, Homies were initially sold in grocery store vending machines and have become a highly collectible item, and have spawned many imitation toys.

== Background and history ==
Gonzales began drawing comics while he was in high school. His amateur comic strip was called The Adventures of Chico Loco, and the characters were based on "barrio guys," as Gonzales grew up on the tough streets of a poverty-ridden Mexican-American neighborhood. The main character, based on Gonzales himself, was called "Hollywood." The strip, which later changed its title to The Adventures of Hollywood, was picked up by Lowrider magazine and published monthly. More and more barrio characters from Gonzales' experiences were introduced to the public through the Hollywood strip — these became "Homies." The word "homie" is an English language slang term found in American urban culture, with the word "homeboy" meaning a male friend from back home. In use in the West Coast Latino community for decades, the word "homie" has crossed over into the mainstream culture.

Gonzales began drawing his humorous characters on T-shirts and other products, which he and his wife sold on local beach stands, swap meets, liquor stores, and eventually urban clothing stores.

In 1998, Gonzales released the first set of Homies figurines, initially sold in supermarket vending machines located in Chicano communities. The first series featured the male characters Eight Ball, Smiley, Big Loco, Droopy, Sapo, and Mr. Raza. The toys were widely popular, with the first series selling a million Homies figures in four months.

The figures caused controversy after their initial release as members of the Los Angeles Police Department argued that the "urban, inner-city Latino" figures glorified gang life. Law enforcement entities pressured retailers to stop selling Homies; as a result, many mainstream stores, such as Walmart and Safeway, stopped selling the toys.

In response, Gonzales repeatedly explained that he "did not create Homies to glamorize gang life." He created stories for each of the characters on the Homies website, with each one embodying a positive trait. Stores quickly returned the Homies to their shelves; the resulting media coverage of the controversy helped Homies gain ever more popularity.

According to Gonzales, he has received orders from countries in Europe, South America, and Africa requesting Homies characters representing people from those continents. By 2005, the Homies line featured female characters, as well as characters with Puerto Rican, Filipino, and Japanese backgrounds. There have been 14 series of Homies, with more than 200 characters.

== Description ==
In their fictional world, the Homies are a group of tightly knit Chicano buddies who grew up in the Mexican-American barrio of "Quien Sabe" ("Who knows?") located in East Los Angeles. In an inner-city world plagued by poverty, violence, and drugs, the Homies form a strong and binding cultural support system that enables them to overcome the surrounding negativity, allowing for laughter and good times as an antidote to reality. As befitting these characters from the barrio, many Homies wear bandanas and baggy pants. The four main Homies are Hollywood (based on creator Gonzales), Smiley, Pelon, and Bobby Loco.

=== Characters ===
Gonzales has created a background for each Homie to have their own story. He made sure that the Homies were authentic because they were based on Latinos in his community. The following is a list of some of the more notable Homies characters:

- First series:
  - Eight Ball — Known for his distinctive low-slung beanie and big smile, he is named for the numbers painted on his shoes
  - Smiley — based on a childhood friend of creator David Gonzales, Smiley is a mechanic who works at "Homies Hydraulics," and is perpetually broke and borrowing money off the other Homies
  - Big Loco — youth gang counselor and arbitrator
  - Droopy — slightly stoned background character
  - Sapo — huge consumer of Mexican food; unpopular with women
  - Mr. Raza — highly educated, with degrees in Chicano Studies and Latin American and Pre-Columbian History
- Subsequent series:
  - Hollywood — based on creator David Gonzales, Hollywood is known by his zoot suit and 1970s disco hairstyle
  - La Gata ("The Cat") — Hollywood's girlfriend, she is loosely based on creator David Gonzales' wife
  - Pelon — based on a childhood friend of creator David Gonzales, Pelon ("bald" in Spanish) is named for his bald head. A small-time hustler, Pelon sells stolen merchandise from the back of his 1941 Chevy panel sedan. Smiley's best friend, Pelon is the most stereotypically cholo of the Homies.
  - Bobby Loco — based on a childhood friend of creator David Gonzales, he is a bouncer at the "Homie Hot Spot"
  - Chuco — short for "Pachuco," a lowriding, zoot suit-wearing Chicano from the 1940s and 50s
  - Joker — true to his name, an inveterate clown and jokester
  - El Paletero — ice cream vendor who works to bring his grandchildren from Mexico
  - Officer Placa — chubby police officer who knows all the Homies by name
  - El Padrecito ("the little father") — Franciscan priest in sunglasses, based on creator David Gonzales' brother Robert (who is a priest)
  - El Profe — a Master's degree-qualified high school teacher who stays in the barrio to help
  - Shady — mother who works as a stripper to support her son
  - Willie G — ex-gangster who works as a counsellor, trying to turn children away from crime. Paralyzed form the waist down as the result of gang violence.
  - Whisper — half-Spanish and half-Sicilian, she is related to The Palermos

== Cultural impact ==
The LAPD's complaints about the Homies figures were based on the characters' appearances. Since gang members are usually depicted in similar clothes as those of the Homies, the police felt the toys promoted gang life. In fact, the Homies figures so closely matched gang members' attire that an L.A. county district deputy attorney was inclined to use the Homies toys as an example of what not to wear. He suggested that people who were dressed in such a manner would be considered as violating probation.

Similarly, Latino advocacy groups such as the Imagen Foundation objected to the Homies portrayal of Chicanos as "gang members, undocumented, or drug dealers." Other groups felt the Homies perpetuated gross stereotypes about Chicanos.

On the other hand, the Homies toy line has been shown to help Latin American adolescents with their cultural identity and self-esteem. As the toy line has expanded, the various characters carry a much greater range of lifestyle choices and possibilities.

Another positive way the Homies toys have influenced society is via Gonzales’s brother, Robert, who after a life of crime and violence, became a priest. Himself a wheelchair user, Robert suggested that Gonzales create a Homie in a wheelchair. Willie G, as the character was named, has since become one of the more popular Homies, even being promoted by the Special Olympics. The Homie character Padrecito ("priest") resembles Robert, and has been used to connect with and help those looking for a route out of the ghetto. Through “El Padrecito’s Online Church,” Homies have made it easier for society to connect with those looking to improve their lives; on the website people can create religious figurines, such as saints.

In 2007, the Pasadena Museum of California Art produced an exhibition called “Beyond Ultraman: Seven Artists Explore the Vinyl Frontier," which featured the Homies characters.

Since they are roughly 1/32 in scale, and are cheaper and more readily available than the figures purpose-manufactured for the hobby, Homies and Gonzales' other figures are sometimes used in the scenery of slot car layouts.

== Spin-offs and ancillary products ==
Homies characters have been featured on school folders, lunchboxes, breath mints, and beach towels. Homies have also been seen on posters, stickers, and clothing, and in YouTube videos.

With their rising popularity, the Homies line branched out to include die-cast cars, among other things. In 2004, Gonzales created Mijos, a line of figurines portrayed as Latino kids, babies, and teens intended for a younger customer base.

Other spin-off toys include The Palermos, a line featuring a fictional Italian American former mafia family now running a pizzeria; and a Trailer Park series.

== In other media ==
In the Season 1 finale episode of The Venture Bros, "Return to Spider-Skull Island", Dr. Orpheus acquires a "Homeboy" figurine from a diner's vending machine, a clear reference to the Homies figures.

American Dad shows Stan breaking a Fabergé egg and saying, "I thought it would have candy or at least a little homie in there."

In 2007, LATV produced a stop-motion animated show about the figures called The Homies Hip Hop Show. Featuring the voices of Karen Anzoategui, Eduardo Arenas, and Wendy Carrillo, the show went straight to DVD.

In 2008, the Homie Rollerz video game was released on the Nintendo DS.
