= Oropax =

German comedy duo

Oropax is a comedy duo from Freiburg im Breisgau, Germany.

The two brothers Volker and Thomas Martins founded it in October 1983 “at 20:31” and in a spontaneous mood.

The Martins brothers are also holders of a Guinness record, because they possess the world’s greatest collection of chewing gums.

In 1992, the duo seriously entered show business. They have described their performance programme as “surprisingly senseless”.

They perform using rapid speech and include 'rough humour' and sometimes film clips. The characters played by Oropax are e.g. “Mister Pinski” (“Herr Pinski”) or the “monk“ (Mönch), who wears an advent wreath on his head (because of the real monks have a tonsure, that may loosely remind one of an advent wreath).

Oropax has appeared in “Viktors Spätprogramm” on SF 1. They celebrated an “orgy” with the audience and one of the brothers started to use double-entendres. Afterwards, he took off his belt, sprayed whipped cream on it and let it slide over his tongue. The monk disturbed the “orgy”. He even disguised himself as a “child” (by wearing a “Simpsons”-T-shirt and walking on his knees).

== Filmography ==
=== DVDs ===
- Der doppelte Halbbruder (2005, 120 Minuten)
- Buddhabrot im Christstollen (2004, 165 Minuten)

=== CDs ===
- EntHemd (2002, 60 minutes, over 800 gags from a performance in the “Unterhaus” in Mainz, 2001)

== Newest programme ==
- Molkerei auf der Bounty (2006)
