= Car hydraulics =

Auto parts

Car hydraulics are equipment installed in an automobile that allows for a dynamic adjustment in height of the vehicle. These suspension modifications are often placed in a lowrider, i.e., a vehicle modified to lower its ground clearance below that of its original design. With these modifications, the body of the car can be raised by remote control. The amount and kind of hydraulic pumps being used and the different specifications of the subject vehicle will affect the impact of such systems on the height and orientation of the vehicle. With sufficient pumps, an automobile can jump and hop upwards of six feet off the ground. Enthusiasts hold car jumping contests nationwide, which are judged on how high an automobile is able to bounce.

== Origin ==
Lowrider automobiles originated from the California custom car community. Hydraulics first came on the scene after the 1958 California lowered vehicle law went into effect. The first documented custom car with Hydraulics was in 1958 when Jim Logue of Long Beach California installed them in his custom 1954 Ford the “Fab X”. In 1959 Ron Aguirre of Rialto California installed hydraulics in his custom 1956 corvette the X Sonic and shortly thereafter, Aguirre began installing Hydraulic lifts in many custom cars in the Inland Empire. During the early 1960’s front hydraulic lifts became a very popular upgrade in many semi custom cars in California. War surplus aircraft hydraulic components were used to raise and lower the ride height. In 1962 the first Chevrolet Impala to feature hydraulics debuted, Tats Gotanda’s 1959 Impala the “Buddha Buggy” which featured hydraulics by Bill Hines. Throughout the 1960‘s a large majority of mild custom cars in Southern California were equipped with hydraulic lifts, eventually this style of car became known as the lowrider car by the early 1970’s. Today, lowriders can be found anywhere, worldwide.

== International ==
In 1979, Japan received a shipment of Low rider magazines, which showed on the cover a lowered Chevy in front of Mount Fuji. This magazine, Orlie's Lowriding Magazine, was a profitable magazine that advertised lowriders and hydraulic kits for their consumers. Along with these magazines came mail-order forms to purchase automotive hydraulics kits. By the 1980s, these kits along with cars, made Japan Orlie's top purchaser.

== Interior ==
The original pumps, valves and cylinders used for the modifications to these cars were originally used for operations performed in aircraft. Using these materials required a great deal of engineering ability in order to get these cars back in working condition after being stripped. For many automobile owners, it was too expensive to have an auto shop install the hydraulics in their car for them. In the early 1960s, owners were left to do the mechanics for their own cars because the kits were not sold in stores until the later 1960s. These hydraulic kits were known as "trays" to many consumers. Many times, since these batteries, pumps and valves were made for such large aircraft originally, extra batteries were needed to assist in the hydraulics. This would run the batteries down more often than the original usage for these batteries, so it was necessary for the owners of these automobiles to charge the automobile's batteries more frequently. After using aircraft materials, trucks' liftgate materials were found to be more manageable on the car as well as easing the maintenance of the car.

These cylinders, two or more, are connected to one pipe that is filled with oil, the basic fluid used for a hydraulic system. The cylinders are used to establish compression pressure of the oil, fluid being supplied by the pump, to push the automobile up. The motion of car is defined by the number of cylinder pumps installed in the vehicle. The number and placement of the pumps determines the range of motion the automobile has. A hydraulic dump valve called a "dump" is used to control the downward movement of the car.

== See also ==
- Automobile
- Custom car
- Hydraulics
- Lowrider
- Los Angeles
