= David Gonzales (cartoonist) =

Cartoonist

- Born: 1964 (age 61–62) Richmond, California
- Areas: cartoonist, apparel designer, toy designer
- Notable works: Homies, Mijos, The Palermos
- Children: Andres, Monica, Anthony

David Gonzales (born 1964 in Richmond, California) is an American cartoonist, apparel designer, and toy designer. He is the creator of the Homies line of toys.

== Biography ==
Gonzales was one of five brothers who were very close. He grew up in a tough, impoverished Mexican-American neighborhood. After attending Roman Catholic elementary school, Gonzales begged his parents to put him in a local public high school because the art program was better.

Gonzales began drawing comics while he was in high school. His amateur comic strip was called The Adventures of Chico Loco, and the characters were based on "barrio guys." The main character, based on Gonzales himself, was called "Hollywood."

Gonzales attended California College of the Arts in Oakland. He had changed the title of his strip to The Adventures of Hollywood when it was picked up as a monthly feature by the San Jose-based Lowrider magazine and steadily gained an audience.

In the early 90s Gonzales began drawing characters from The Adventures of Hollywood on T-shirts and other products, which he and his wife sold at local beach stands, swap meets, liquor stores, and eventually urban clothing stores. These characters were the templates for Homies. Under the Gonzales Graphics name, Gonzales also sold shirts geared toward "La Raza," with Aztec designs, Pachuco imagery, and illustrations of the Mexican Revolution.

Gonzales lived in Taos from 1994 to 1998, when he moved back to the Bay Area. It was at that point that Gonzales shifted direction from T-shirts to toy design. He released the first set of Homies figurines, which were initially sold in supermarket vending machines in Chicano communities throughout California. Gonzales initially had trouble selling his product, in particular because the Los Angeles Police Department claimed that the toys glorified gang life. In response, many stores stopped selling the Homies.

Gonzales repeatedly explained that he “did not create Homies to glamorize gang life.” Met with the challenge of re-imagining his characters, he went back to the drawing board and gave each individual Homies character an inspiring biography. He created stories for each characters on the Homies website, with each one embodying a positive trait. Stores quickly returned the Homies to their shelves; the resulting media coverage of the controversy helped Homies gain ever more popularity. The toys were widely popular, with the first series selling a million Homies figures in four months.

Gonzales claims that after he re-invented the Homies characters, police representatives have introduced themselves at public functions and individual police officers have even ordered Homies figures from him personally.

In 2004, Gonzales released the Mijos toy line of youth characters related to the Homies. Also in 2004, Gonzales introduced a toy line named The Palermos, featuring a fictional Italian American former mafia family now running a pizzeria;

By 2013, Gonzales had shifted his focus once again to apparel, creating the T-shirt brand DGAtees, featuring his own art as well as his son Anthony's.

== Personal life ==
Gonzales has three grown children. After living for many years in Hercules, California, by 2013 he had relocated to Southern California.

One of Gonzales’s brothers, Robert, has become peripherally involved in the Homies toy line. After a life of crime and violence, Robert became a priest. Himself using a wheelchair, Robert suggested that Gonzales create a Homie in a wheelchair. Willie G, as the character was named, has since become one of the more popular Homies, even being promoted by the Special Olympics. In addition, the Homie character Padrecito ("priest") resembles Robert, and has been used to connect with and help those looking for a route out of the ghetto. Through Robert's “El Padrecito’s Online Church,” Homies have made it easier for society to connect with those looking to improve their lives; on the website people can create religious figurines, such as saints.
