= Teen Angels (magazine) =

Independent American magazine on Chicano culture

Teen Angels was an independent American magazine focused on the Chicano culture of California and the southwest, published from approximately 1981 to 2006. The publication featured art, photos, and writing celebrating pachuco culture, lowriders, cholo street culture, fashion, tattoos, prison art, and barrios, or neighborhoods. The magazine consisted of photocopied photographs, hand-drawn portraits and lowrider art, typographic pages, poetry, community notices, comic strips, dedications, obituaries, articles, and other works. It was produced in self-published zine format.

== History ==
Teen Angels (also varying title across some issues as Teen Angel's) was founded by David Holland, a San Jose, California based artist. Holland was an early contributor to Lowrider magazine under the artist name "Teen Angel." He left Lowrider in 1979 to found Teen Angels, with its first publication in 1981.

Regular production ceased in 2006, however several special issues were released in later years. Holland died in 2015.

== Reception ==
The magazine garnered a large underground following and was dubbed "The Voice of the Varrio." It is often referenced as one of the earliest forms of communication between various neighborhoods and the Chicano community across the southland and beyond.

== Controversy ==
Although the publication regularly printed anti-violence and anti-drug slogans, authorities accused the magazine of glorifying the violent street gang lifestyle. Police used Teen Angels magazine as an insider guide to learn gangs fashion trends and graffiti pseudonyms in the early 1990s. It was banned in some correctional facilities and not carried by most mainstream retailers.

== In popular culture ==
In the 1993 cult film Mi Vida Loca, the character known as Mona ("Sad Girl") flips through the pages of Teen Angel to show her sister the contents, describing it as a “magazine that shows how we were really like.”
