= Lowrider =

Customized car with a lowered body

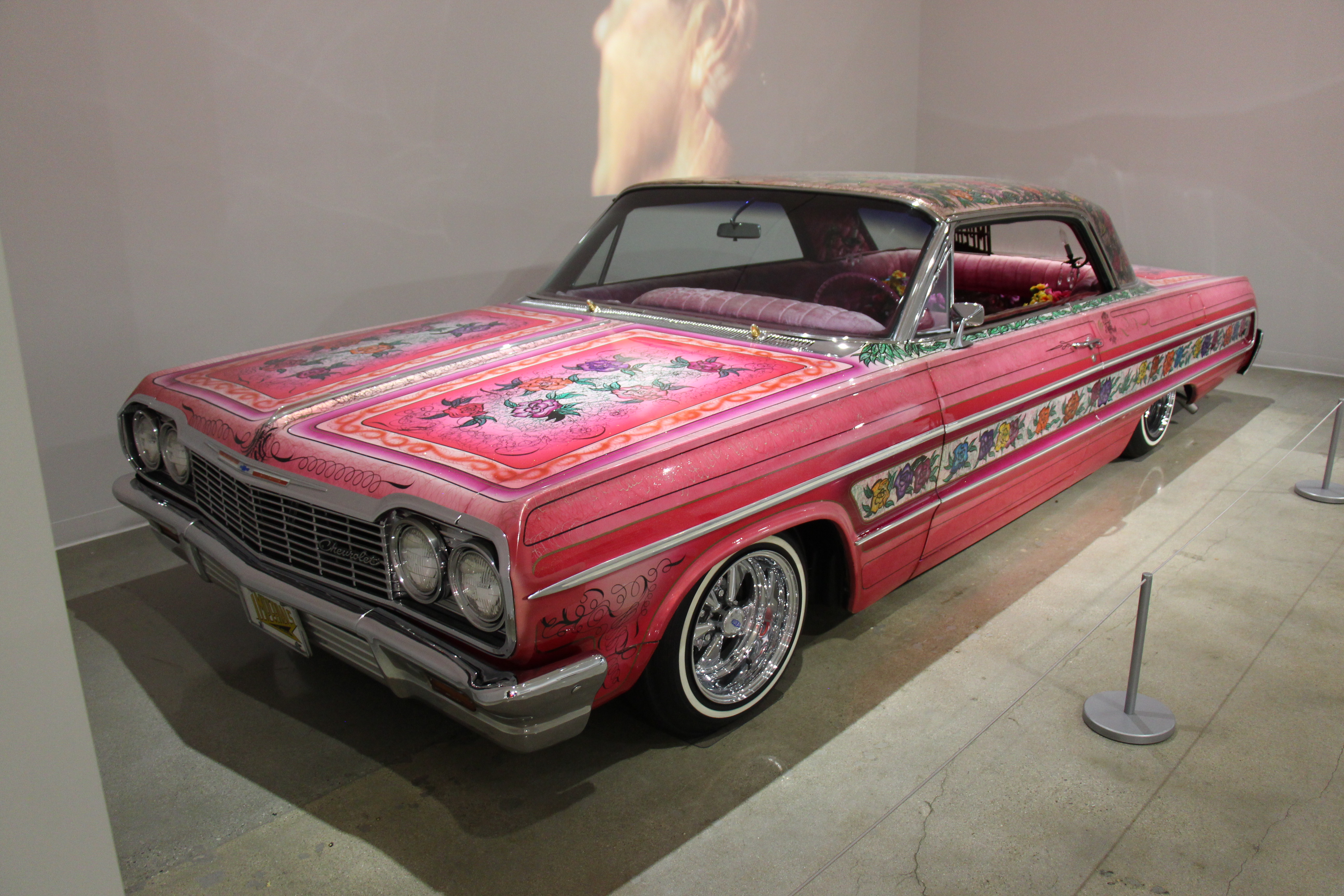
1964 Chevrolet Impala named "Gypsy Rose," owned by Jesse Valadez, on display in the Petersen Automotive Museum. It is considered one of the most iconic lowriders ever built.

A lowrider or low rider is a customized car with a lowered body that emerged in the post-WWII, 1940s–1950s era. The exact origin of the lowrider is debatable, but it was likely birthed in Southern California, with many people claiming that lowriders really started in Tijuana, Texas, or New Mexico. Lowriders were particularly popular amongst young Chicanos, who adopted the art of rolling “low and slow” (or bajito y suavecito), directly opposing mainstream culture which focused on fast cars such as hot rods. In lowrider culture, lowriders are considered to serve as transportation art or transported art.

Lowrider also refers to the driver of the car and their participation in lowrider car clubs, which remain a part of Chicano culture and have since expanded internationally. These customized vehicles are also artworks, generally being painted with intricate, colorful designs, unique aesthetic features, and rolling on wire-spoke wheels with whitewall tires.

Lowrider rims are generally smaller than the original wheels. They are often fitted with hydraulic systems that allow height adjustable suspension, allowing the car to be lowered or raised by switch. From 1958 to 2023, the California Vehicle Code made lowriding illegal, which was ultimately criticized as unnecessary and discriminatory toward Chicano and broader Latin American culture.

== Origin and purpose ==
Lowrider car culture began in Southern California, in the mid-to-late 1940s, and grew during the post-war prosperity of the 1950s within Mexican-American youth culture. Conversion of standard production vehicles included adding lowering blocks and cut-down spindles, reduced-length suspension spring coils, and creating "Z frames" from stock straight frames. The purpose of lowriders, as their motto "Low and Slow" suggests, is to cruise as slowly and as smoothly as possible.

== Legal issues ==
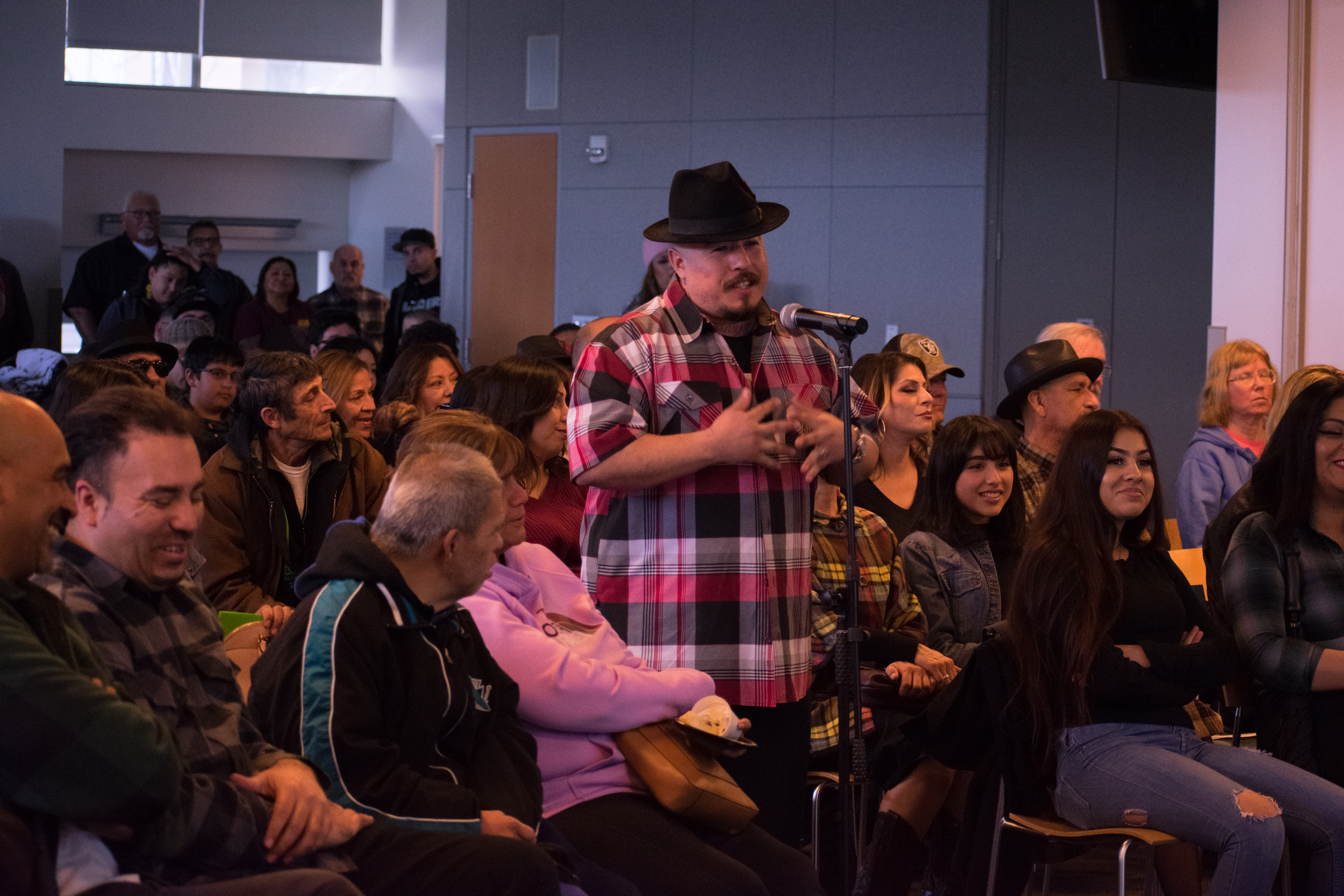
Lowrider culture and society public conference in San Jose, California (2019). The city was among the first to repeal its ban on lowriding in 2022.

Section 24008 of the California Vehicle Code went into effect on January 1, 1958, prohibiting cars modified to shift the vehicle body lower than the bottoms of its wheel rims. In 1959, mechanic Ron Aguirre bypassed the law by installing hydraulics that could quickly toggle the height of a General Motors X-frame chassis.

Lowriding became widely popular in the 1980s and 1990s, and bans were enacted in many California cities. It regained popularity a little in 2009, then significantly during the COVID-19 pandemic in the United States. In the 2020s, activists argued that the practice was harmless and banning it was simply the result of prejudice against Mexican-Americans. San Jose and Sacramento repealed their bans in 2022 that had been enacted in 1986 and 1988, respectively. In 2022, the California State Assembly unanimously passed a resolution urging all remaining cities with bans (including National City, which banned it in 1992) to repeal them. In 2023, California rescinded state restrictions on the height of vehicle bodies and superseded local regulations against cruising. National City repealed its ban on cruising in April 2023.

In 2020, police in Albuquerque, New Mexico introduced a lowrider police car in a reversal of the city's anti-lowriding policies.

== Adding height adjustable suspension ==
In 1959, a customizer named Ron Aguirre developed a way of bypassing the law with the use of hydraulic Pesco pumps and valves that allowed him to change ride height at the flick of a switch. He developed this modification with help from his father, after conceiving of the idea. Aguirre's motivation was to stop being targeted with traffic tickets, as he had been by local police in his city of Rialto, California after the statewide ban was enacted.

== Role of the Chevrolet Impala ==
1958 saw the emergence of the Chevrolet Impala, which featured an X-shaped frame that was perfectly suited for lowering and modification with hydraulics. The standard perimeter-type frame was abandoned, replaced by a unit with rails laid out in the form of an elongated "X." Chevrolet claimed that the new frame offered increased torsional rigidity and allowed for a lower placement of the passenger compartment. This was a transitional step between conventional perimeter frame construction and the later fully unitized body/chassis. The body structure was strengthened in the rocker panels and firewall. A drawback is that this frame was not as effective as a conventional perimeter frame in protecting the interior structure in the event of a side impact crash.

== Lowrider culture ==
Lowrider cars had their origins in the 1940s, when Mexican American veterans began customizing vehicles to run "low and slow", a contrast to the hot rod that was customized for speed. During the Chicano Movement in the 1970s, lowriders formed car clubs that began to help their community by using these cars for fundraising. Lowrider cars are typically elaborately painted and decorated, often using graphic art of significance to Chicano culture.

In the 1970s, Lowrider magazine promoted an association between lowriders and pachucas, pachucos, and zoot suiters by filling its pages with advertisements and photographs that reflected those fashions. The 1979 play Zoot Suit and 1981 movie Zoot Suit reinforced the connection between zoot suit fashion and lowriders. Lowrider also featured cholas, although some established lowrider clubs disdain chola fashion.

The 21st century boom in lowrider culture is generational, with children being introduced to it by parents and grandparents. Participants view it proudly as an aspect of Latino history in the United States.

=== California ===
At first, lowriders were only seen in places such as Los Angeles, especially in the 1970s on Whittier Boulevard when lowriding came to its peak. Whittier was a wide commercial street that cut through the barrio of the city in Los Angeles, California. Throughout the 1970s that culture spread throughout the Central Valley and San Jose areas of California, helped by release of the funk song “Low Rider” by War, and creation of low riding clubs such as Carnales Unidos in 1975, and further expanded with the publishing of Low Rider magazine by San Jose State students in 1977. At its peak in 1988, Low Rider magazine had monthly sales of over 60,000 copies. Lowriders were featured in the 1979 film Boulevard Nights, which some blamed for associating lowrider culture with street gangs. A mural in Chicano Park celebrates the lowrider culture. In 2024, the Oceanside, California community and its police department collaborated to create a hand-painted lowrider police car, and the San Jose Police Department planned to participate in the city's Cinco de Mayo lowrider parade with its own lowrider vehicle.

In 2026, a bill authorizing specialized license plates that honor lowrider culture was signed into law. Proceeds from the specialized plates will be reinvested to support lowrider arts and cultural preservation.

=== New Mexico ===
In the US state of New Mexico, lowriders play a central role in New Mexican culture, particularly of the Hispanos of New Mexico.

In Albuquerque, cruising on Central Avenue (U.S. Route 66) has become a tradition, particularly on Sundays. The city and Albuquerque Police Department (APD) used to take a firm stance against this practice, but in recent years have reversed this stance, with APD introducing a lowrider police car and the city creating a 'Cruising Task Force' to "promote responsible cruising" in the city.

The cities of Española and neighboring Chimayó have become hotspots for lowriders in the northern part of the state. Española is billed as the "lowrider capital of the world".

=== Japan ===
Lowriding culture has also spread to Japan.

Junichi Shimodaira continues to import and sell these cars through his business, Paradise Road. The spread of lowrider culture and the fame of Paradise Road even attracted the attention of Ed Roth, who is famous for creating custom cars such as hot rods and is a prominent figure in Kustom Kulture. Since the introduction of lowriders in Japan and their rise in 2001, it is estimated there exist about 200 car clubs in Japan related to the lowrider scene still active to this day.

=== National recognition ===
In recognition of the lowrider culture, the United States Postal Service announced the release of a series of lowrider-themed forever stamps in March 2026.

=== In popular culture ===
The 1975 song "Low Rider" by the band War, highlighting the culture, reached #7 on the US Billboard Hot 100 chart.

In the 1990s, low riders became strongly associated with West Coast Hip hop and G-Funk culture. Eazy-E, Mack 10, Ice Cube, Dr. Dre, Snoop Dogg, The Game, Warren G, Tupac Shakur, South Central Cartel, Above the Law and John Cena (In a music video of "Right Now") among others featured low riders prominently in their music videos.

== Women in lowrider culture ==
For much of lowriding's history, women were present but rarely centered. Car clubs were historically all-male, with wives and girlfriends handling planning, correspondence, and fundraising from behind the scenes rather than working on the cars themselves. Gloria Ruelas, who married into Duke's Car Club (the oldest continuously running lowrider club in Los Angeles) in 1974, spent decades as the club's secretary, treasurer, and de facto events coordinator, work she described as "another job" layered on top of raising a family. "There were a few [women] that had their own cars then, but not very many," she recalled. "The roles were the same as my roles. You were kind of like, on the sidelines." Denise Sandoval, a professor of Chicana/o Studies at Cal State Northridge who has studied and participated in lowrider culture for more than 20 years, has traced this dynamic to the culture's visual language as well: alongside religious imagery and pinstriping, custom cars were frequently decorated with murals of women in revealing poses, a practice she describes as treating the female body as an ornament to the vehicle rather than a driver of it. "The lowrider culture is not only dependent on the bodies of cars, but also on the bodies of women," Sandoval said. "It's sort of like this marriage of objects." Lowrider magazine reflected the same pattern commercially: after struggling through its early years, the publication began pairing bikini-clad women with cars on its cover starting with the November 1979 issue, a formula it credited with turning around its circulation.

Women were not entirely absent from the driver's seat. One of the earliest known all-female car clubs, the Lady Bugs Car Club, formed in the early 1970s in and around Los Angeles on the strength of the Volkswagen Beetle's popularity; every member owned a Beetle, and the club was prominent for most of the decade before disbanding. But for the following twenty years, dedicated women's car clubs remained rare.

=== A Modern Resurgence ===
That began to change in 2000, when the Black Widows Car Club formed in Los Angeles — the first all-female club to appear in the city since the Lady Bugs era. Fifteen years later came Las Chingonas Car Club, followed in quick succession by Varrio Vamps Car Club (co-founded by Julie "Latina Vamp" Maldonado and Lillian "Lily Montzer" Romero, who build and drive classic cars rather than hydraulic lowriders), Sandy Avila's Lady Lowriders Car Club, and Latin Queens Inland Empire; further north, Sunnyvale saw the formation of Dueñas Car Club. Avila, who co-founded the six-member, Pasadena-based Lady Lowriders in 2021 after buying and restoring a 1984 Oldsmobile Cutlass Supreme she named Simply Beautiful, said she had rarely encountered other women's car clubs before starting her own. "Before last year, I had never really heard of an all-women's car club," she said. "But then, when me and my girl decided to start one, I started looking and I started seeing a couple, a couple here, a couple there. And I was like, so they do exist." Sandoval attributes much of the resurgence to social media, which has let women lowriders find one another and build community independent of the male-dominated club structure. "We're seeing it now: the birth of all-girl car clubs," she said. "Women are becoming the next chapter."

=== Tina Blankenship-Early, "First Lady of Lowriding" ===
No individual is more closely associated with that shift than Tina Blankenship-Early of South Los Angeles. Raised in Watts and immersed in lowrider culture since childhood, Blankenship-Early taught herself to install car audio systems in the late 1980s and began working for local clubs; after installing a system for the president of the Super Natural Lowriders, she was invited to join in 1998 as the club's first woman member. Fellow club officer Gerald Hill gave her the nickname "First Lady," which has followed her ever since — she now serves as the club's vice president, using the role to organize food drives and school-supply giveaways in her community. She was inducted into the National Lowrider Hall of Fame in 2012, becoming the first woman so honored, and in 2023 she became the first woman ever name Lowrider Magazine's Woman of the Year. The following year, she appeared on the cover of the magazine's special issue honoring women in lowriding, alongside Jacqueline Valenzuela of Whittier, Sandy Avila of Pasadena and Angel Romero of Sunnyvale. Her best-known car, a 1966 Chevrolet Caprice named "Game Killa" that she bought for $500 in 2005 and spent three years restoring, has won dozens of awards and appeared in music videos and in advertising for the 2015 film Straight Outta Compton; a second lowrider, a blue 1961 Impala she all calls "First Lady," carries a painted tribute to Michelle Obama on its trunk. Longtime Super Natural Lowriders member Les Riley, who has been in the scene for nearly 40 years, credited her standing in the club plainly: "She's [Tina] doing everything the men are doing and probably doing it better. So I take my hat off to her."

Blannkenship-Early's prominence has helped fuel the formation of still more women's clubs, including the Los Angeles-based Girlz in the Hood and Thee Lady Lowriders, both frequently cited as part of the current generation of all-women crews building on the ground she and her predecessors broke.

== Gallery ==
Examples of lowriders
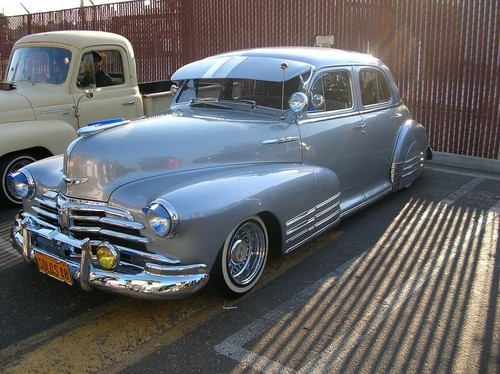
1948 Chevrolet Fleetline lowrider. Lowriders from the 1930s through the early 1950s are typically called "bombs" in the community.

Test of a 1964 Chevrolet Impala hydraulic system

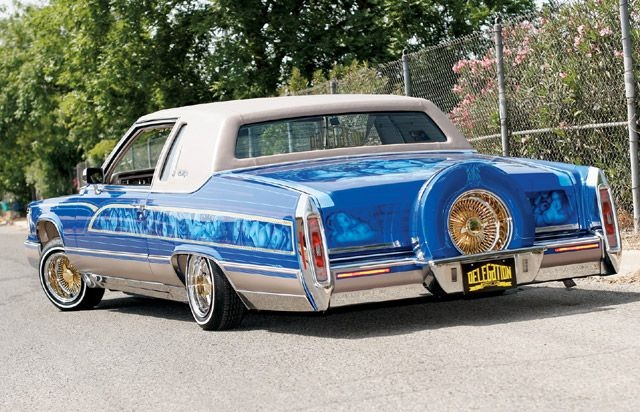
1988 Cadillac Fleetwood Brougham lowrider

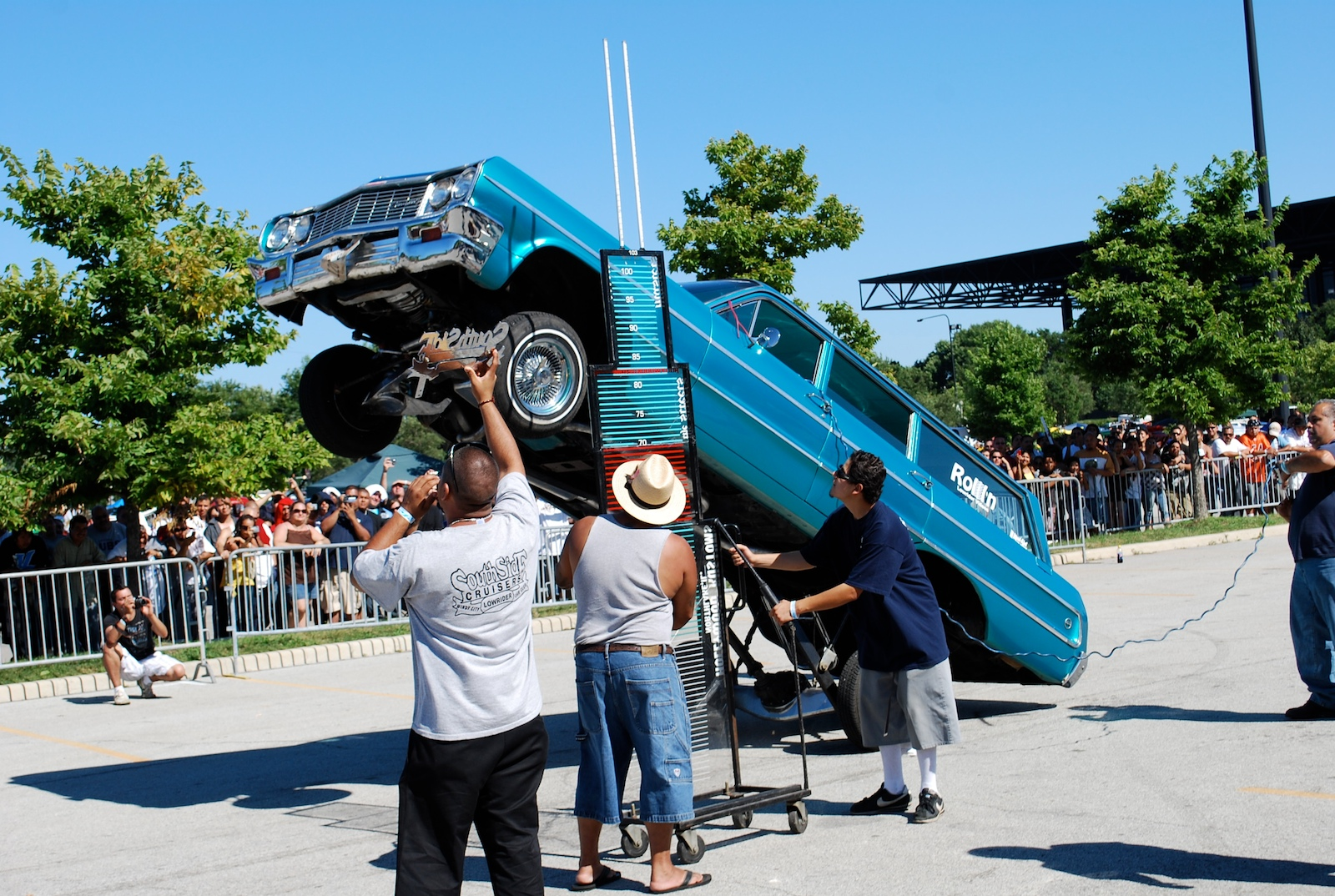
Chevrolet wagon lowrider equipped with hydraulic suspension hopping

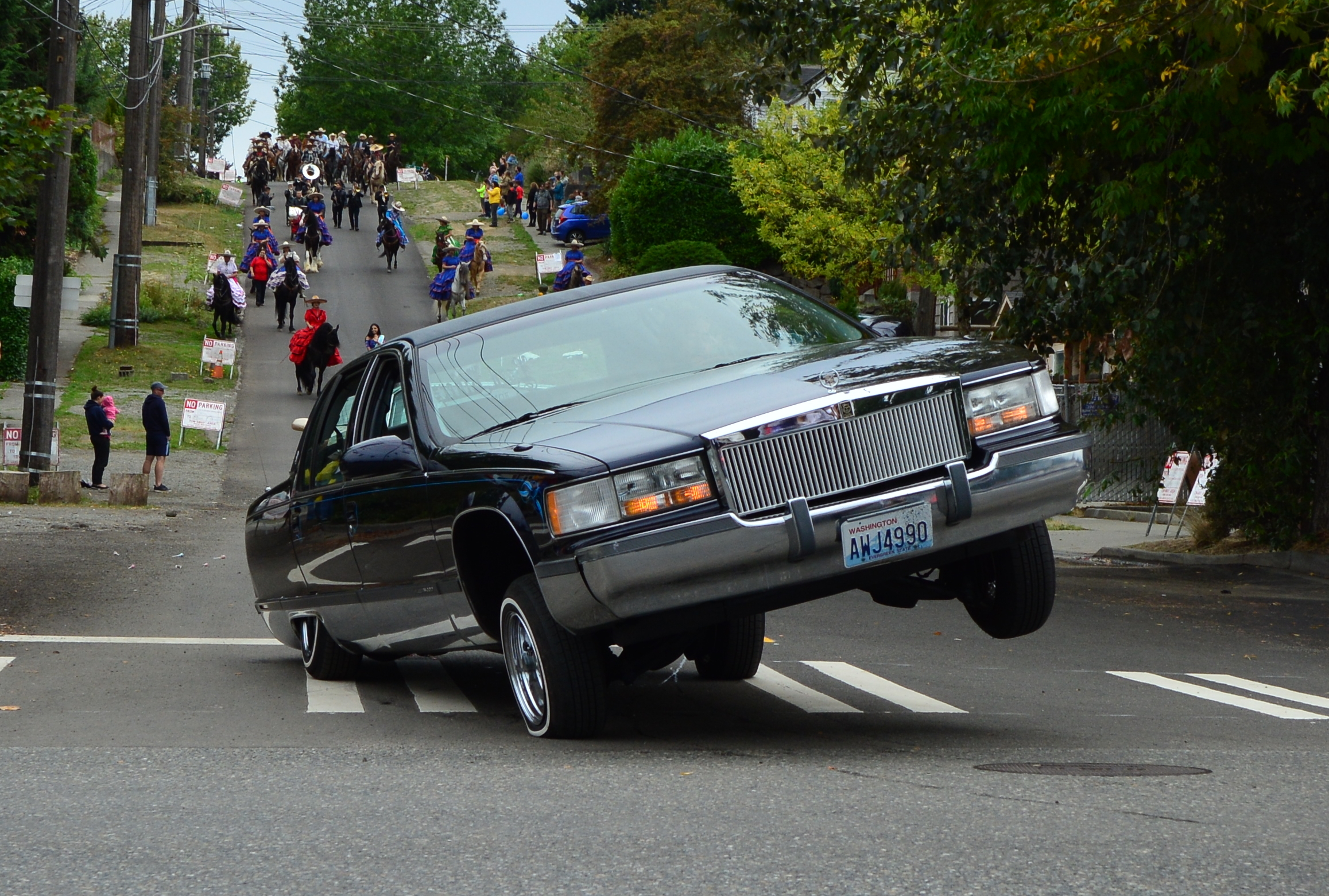
A 1994 Cadillac Fleetwood lowrider 3-wheeling during the Fiestas Patrias Parade, South Park, Seattle, Washington

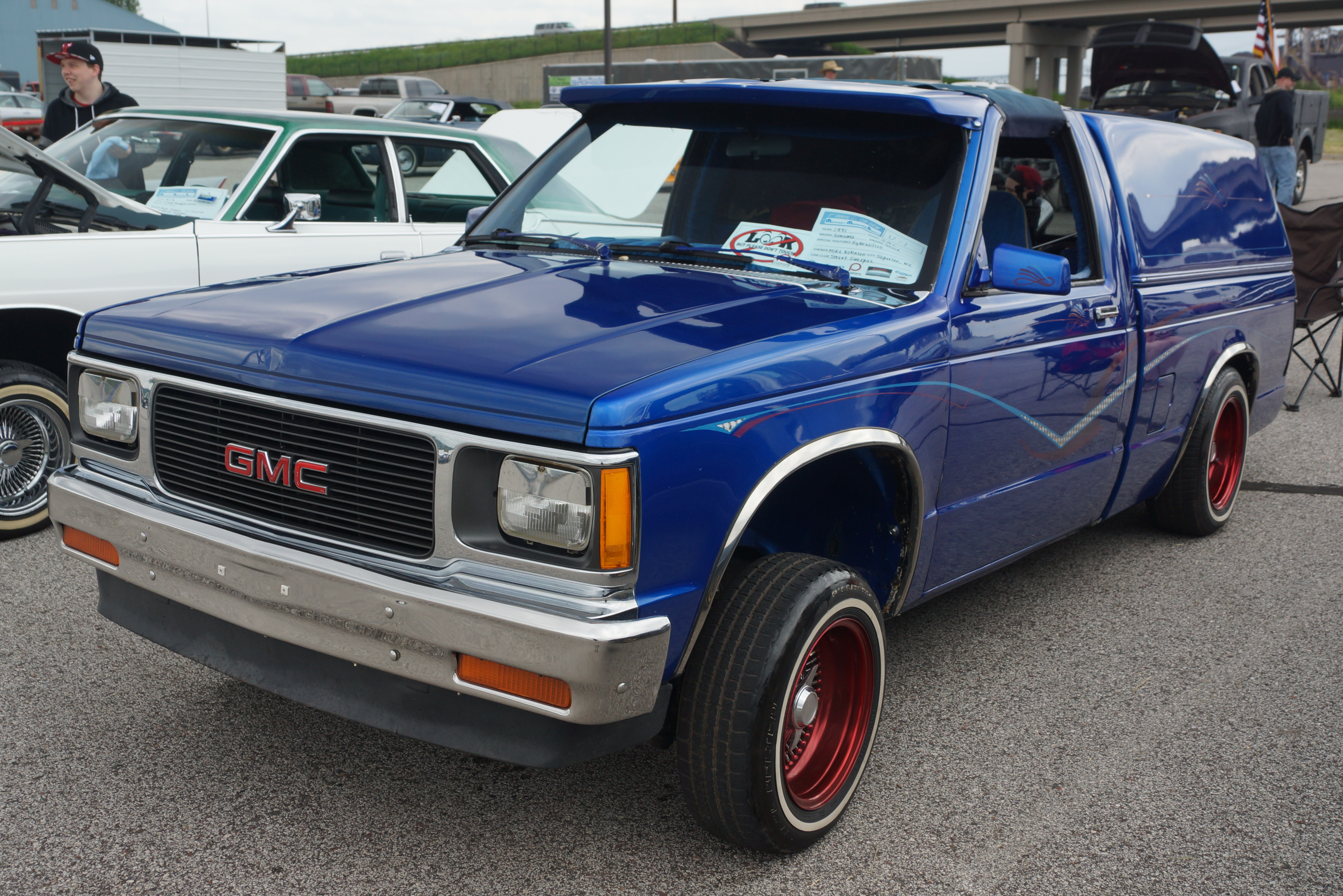
1991 GMC Sonoma pickup modified in the lowrider style

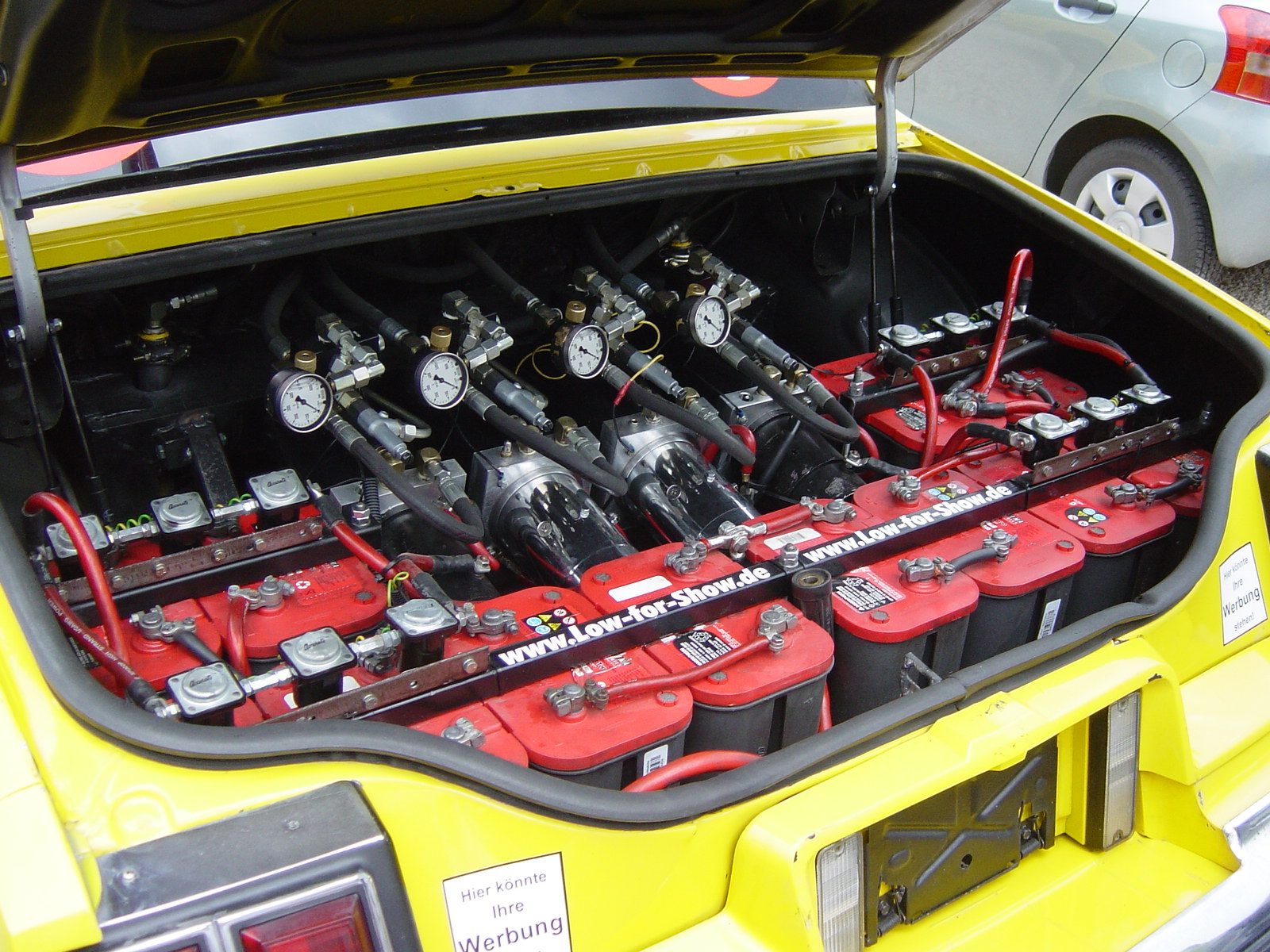
Hydraulic suspension system in the trunk of an Oldsmobile, running 12 batteries and 4 hydraulic pumps. This system is set up for frequent hopping, whereas a lowrider designed for cruising typically uses fewer batteries and pumps.

== See also ==
- Lowrider bicycle
- Chicano Rap
- Gangsta Rap (album) which includes the track: Ridin' Low
- G-funk
- Slab
- Kid Frost
