= Lowrider (magazine) =

American automotive magazine

- August 2003 issue of Lowrider Magazine
- Editor-in-chief: Carlos "Los" Fernandez
- Categories: Automobile magazine
- Frequency: Monthly
- Publisher: Carlos "Los" Fernandez
- Total circulation: 200,000 (December 2015)
- Founded: 1976
- First issue: January 1977
- Company: Lowrider Ventures LLC
- Country: United States
- Language: English
- Website: www.lowrider.com
- ISSN: 0199-9362

Lowrider was an American automobile magazine, focusing almost exclusively on the style known as a lowrider. It first appeared in 1977, produced out of San Jose, California, by a trio of San Jose State students. In 2007, it was published out of Anaheim, California, and part of the Motor Trend Group. The magazine was closed in December 2019.

Lowrider focused on all aspects of lowrider culture, from cars to music and fashion. It also covered political and cultural issues related to Chicanos, and funded an annual scholarship program. The magazine also released a series of music videos through their label, Thump Records.

In 2000, the magazine's monthly circulation was more than 200,000. Lowrider's monthly circulation was less than 56,000 at the end of 2011.

== Publication history ==
Lowrider was founded in the mid-1970s by San Jose State students Larry Gonzalez, Sonny Madrid, and David Nunez, "who sought to present a voice for the Chicano community in the Bay Area." The first issue debuted in January 1977.

Essentially self-distributed, the magazine struggled until the November 1979 issue, when it began pairing bikini-clad women with lowriders on the cover each issue.

An early artistic contributor to the magazine, David Holland, split with Lowrider to found his own Teen Angels Magazine in 1979, with the first issue published in 1981.

In the early 1980s, Lowrider also featured cartoonist David Gonzales' monthly comic strip The Adventures of Hollywood, which eventually morphed into the Homies line of toy figurines.

Even so, after being taken over by its printer, Lowrider folded in December 1985.

The magazine was revived in June 1988 by original co-founder Larry Gonzalez along with brothers Alberto and Lonnie Lopez. They moved the magazine's headquarters to Fullerton, California (closer to the heart of lowrider culture), and began featuring customized trucks on the cover.

As the magazine increased readership through the late 1980s and early '90s it spun off other titles, established a merchandising division, and began sponsoring multi-annual lowrider shows which took place all over the Western U.S.

Lowrider Publishing Group was acquired in 1997 by automotive periodicals conglomerate McMullen Argus Publishing, which was itself acquired in 1999 by PriMedia (now Rent Group). In 2007, Lowrider was taken over by Source Interlink Media, now known as TEN: The Enthusiast Network.

== Offshoots ==
- Roll Models: The Lowrider Magazine YouTube Channel which features driver profiles
- Lowrider Arte: quarterly magazine featuring the art of lowrider culture
- Lowrider Bicycle: established 1993, it is marketed to preteens and young teens who customize their bicycles
- Lowrider Euros: Volkswagen and Toyota lowriders; eventually merged into Lowrider Edge
- Lowrider Truck: lowrider pickups; eventually merged into Lowrider Edge
- Lowrider Japan: Tokyo-based Japanese-language version, published under license
- Lowrider Edge: "New Age Custom" lowrider cars, bikes, and trucks

== Awards ==
Lowrider Magazine established its awards program in 1978, with the highly coveted "Lowrider of the Year" title. The competition grew into a national program through the magazine's famous Super Show circuit, recognizing top automotive artistry and hydraulic builds across the country.

In 2023, Lowrider Magazine named Tina Blankenship-Early, a longtime member of the Los Angeles-based Super Natural Lowriders car club, its first Woman of the Year and the first woman elected to the magazine's Hall of Fame. She appeared on the magazine's cover the following year for a special edition honoring women lowriders including Jacqueline Valenzuela (Whittier, CA), Sandy Avila (Pasadena, CA), and Angel Romero (Sunnyvale, CA).
