= Deichkind =

German hip-hop / electro band

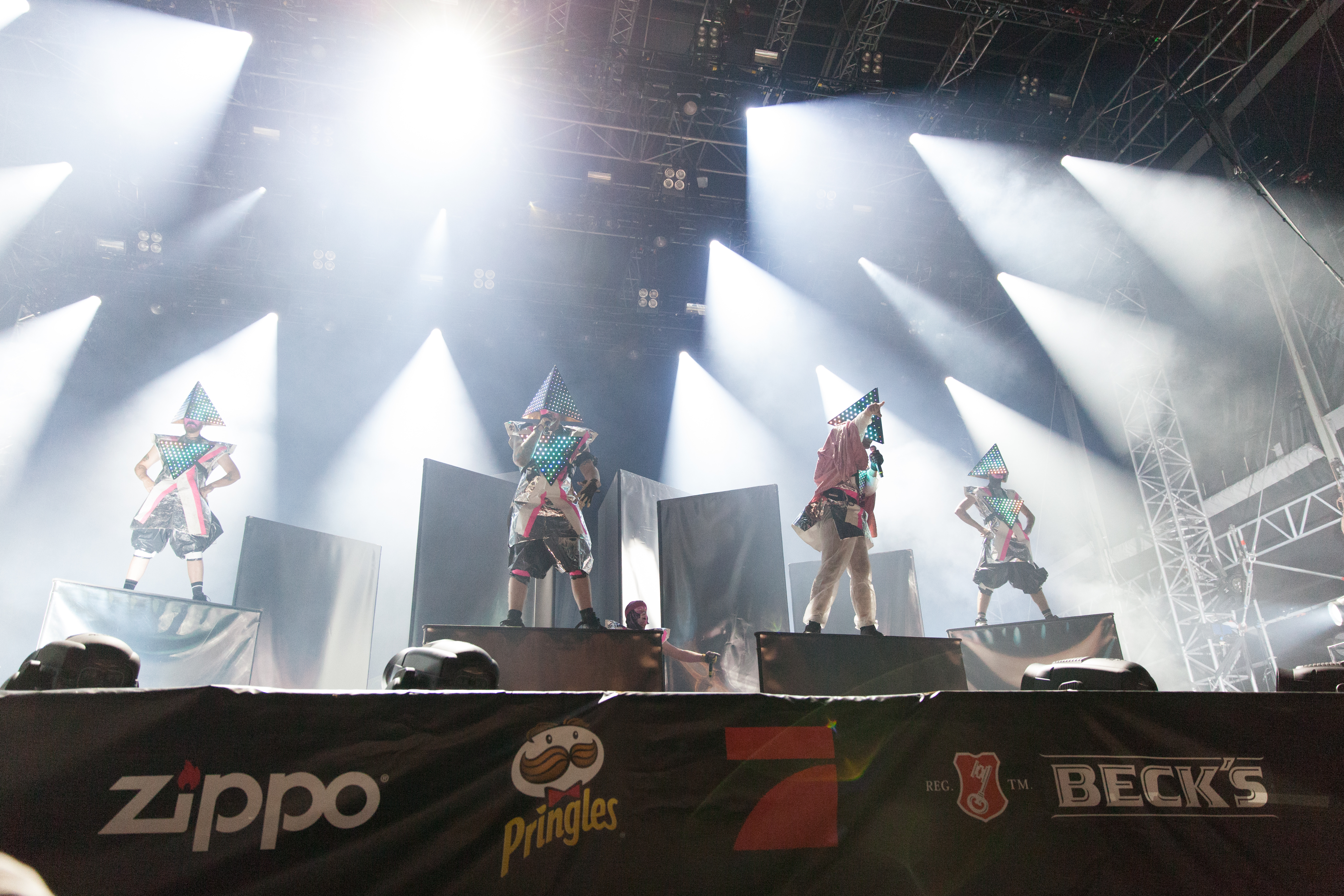
- Rock'n'heim 2014

Background information
- Origin: Hamburg, Germany
- Genres: German hip hop; electropunk; electroclash; electropop
- Years active: 1997–present
- Labels: 1997–2002: Showdown; 2006: Island; 2008–2012: Universal; 2014–present: Sultan Günther; 2019–present: Deichkind Enterprises
- Members: Philipp “Kryptik Joe” Grütering; Henning “DJ Phono” Besser; Sebastian “Porky” Dürre (since 2005); Roland “Roy” Knauf (since 2009)
- Past members: Malte Pittner (1997–2006; d. 2025); Bartosch “Buddy Buxbaum” Jeznach (1997–2008); Sebastian “Sebi” Hackert (1997 – d. 2009); Ferris MC (Sascha “Ferris Hilton” Reimann) (2008–2018)
- Website: deichkind.de

Deichkind (German pronunciation: [ˈdaɪçkɪnt], literally Dyke Child) is a German electropunk band formed in Hamburg in 1997. Current members are “Kryptik Joe” alias Philipp Grütering (rapper/songwriter), Henning “DJ Phono” Besser (DJ), Sebastian “Porky” Dürre (rapper/songwriter) and Roland “Roy” Knauf (producer). Deichkind started with hip hop, later added elements of electronic dance music to its style. The band themselves call their music TechRap as a combination of techno and rap music. The songs are often satirical and criticize consumerism and the performance-oriented society.

== History ==
The band had its first success at the turn of the millennium with single Bon Voyage. Deichkind's early style could be described as alternative hip hop, during the 2000s its style incorporated more and more elements from electronic music, dance and punk. The most famous examples of this electronic-leaning hip hop sound are the three singles, Remmidemmi (Yippie Yippie Yeah) (2006), Arbeit nervt (2008), and Leider geil (2012). These three singles placed in the charts.

In 2005, the group represented Mecklenburg-Vorpommern in the Bundesvision Song Contest 2005, with the song Electric Super Dance Band, placing 14th with 12 points.

In 2009, Sebastian “Sebi” Hackert, the band's longtime producer, died.

Befehl von ganz unten (2012) was Deichkind's first hit album, selling more than 200,000 units. Niveau Weshalb Warum (2015) debuted at number-one on the album charts in Germany and Switzerland.

The group contributed the song Happy New Fear to the soundtrack of the German film Victoria in 2015.

In 2018, rapper Sascha Reimann alias Ferris MC and “Ferris Hilton” left Deichkind after ten years.

Henning Besser serves as the band's creative director and is responsible for its visual presentation. He oversees the concepts for live shows, as well as costumes, photo and video concepts. In the past, he regularly collaborated with a team of visual artists, including Daniel Josefsohn, Tim Bruening, Roman Schramm, Benjakon, and Auge Altona, an alliance of filmmakers.

Although the band originates from Hamburg, it now works mainly in Berlin.

== Discography ==
=== Studio albums ===
Year	Title	Release	Label	Peak chart positions			Certifications (sales thresholds)
Year	Title	Release	Label	GER	AUT	SWI	Certifications (sales thresholds)
2000	Bitte ziehen Sie durch	8 September 2000	Showdown Records	18	—	—	
2002	Noch fünf Minuten Mutti	28 January 2002	Showdown Records	17	56	—	
2006	Aufstand im Schlaraffenland	19 May 2006	Island Records	68	—	—	
2008	Arbeit nervt	17 October 2008	Universal Music	13	30	80	
2012	Befehl von ganz unten	23 January 2012	Universal Music	2	5	16	BVMI: Platinum: IFPI Austria: Gold
2015	Niveau weshalb warum	31 January 2015	Sultan Günther Music	1	2	1	
2019	Wer sagt denn das?	27 September 2019	Sultan Günther Music	3	4	8	
2023	Neues vom Dauerzustand	17 February 2023	Sultan Günther Music	2	2	4	
"—" denotes a recording that did not chart or was not released in that territory.

=== Singles ===
List of singles, with selected chart positions and certifications, showing year released and album name
Title	Year	Length	Peak chart positions			Album	Certifications (sales thresholds)
Title	Year	Length	GER	AUT	SWI	Album	Certifications (sales thresholds)
"Wer bremst das?!"	1998	4:37	—	—	—		
"Bon Voyage" featuring Nina	2000	3:23 (album version), 3:28 (radio edit)	11	17	34	Bitte ziehen Sie durch	
"Komm schon"	2000	3:54	76	—	—	Bitte ziehen Sie durch	
"Weit weg!" featuring Bintia	2000	4:53 (album version), 3:52 (radio edit)	67	—	—	Bitte ziehen Sie durch	
"Limit"	2002	3:02	21	25	95	Noch fünf Minuten Mutti	
"Pferd im Stall"	2002	3:51	—	—	—	Noch fünf Minuten Mutti	
"E. S. D. B." / "Electric Superdance Band"	2005	2:28	—	—	—	Aufstand im Schlaraffenland	
"Remmidemmi (Yippie Yippie Yeah)"	2006	3:43	68	—	—	Aufstand im Schlaraffenland	
"Ich betäube mich" featuring Sarah Walker	2006	3:33	—	—	—	Aufstand im Schlaraffenland	
"Arbeit nervt"	2008	3:18	23	29	—	Arbeit nervt	
"Luftbahn"	2009	3:23	36	—	—	Arbeit nervt	
"Bück dich hoch"	2012	4:07	11	33	—	Befehl von ganz unten	BVMI: Gold
"Leider geil"	2012	3:11 (album version), 3:09 (radio edit)	6	6	61	Befehl von ganz unten	BVMI: Gold; IFPI Austria: Gold
"Der Mond"	2012	4:24	68	61	—	Befehl von ganz unten	
"Ich habe eine Fahne"	2014	3:36	—	—	—	—	
"So 'ne Musik"	2014	3:11	27	—	—	Niveau weshalb warum	
"Denken Sie groß"	2015	4:01	36	—	—	Niveau weshalb warum	
"Like mich am Arsch"	2015	3:33	3	—	81	Niveau weshalb warum	
"Selber machen lassen"	2015	3:39	3	—	81	Niveau weshalb warum	
"Happy New Fear"	2015		—	—	—	Victoria soundtrack	
"Richtig gutes Zeug"	2019	2:50	—	—	—	Wer sagt denn das?	
"Wer sagt denn das?"	2019	3:32	—	—	—	Wer sagt denn das?	
"Keine Party"	2019	5:34	—	—	—	Wer sagt denn das?	
"Dinge"	2019	3:32	—	—	—	Wer sagt denn das?	
"—" denotes a recording that did not chart or was not released in that territory.
