= Die Nerven =

German dream pop band

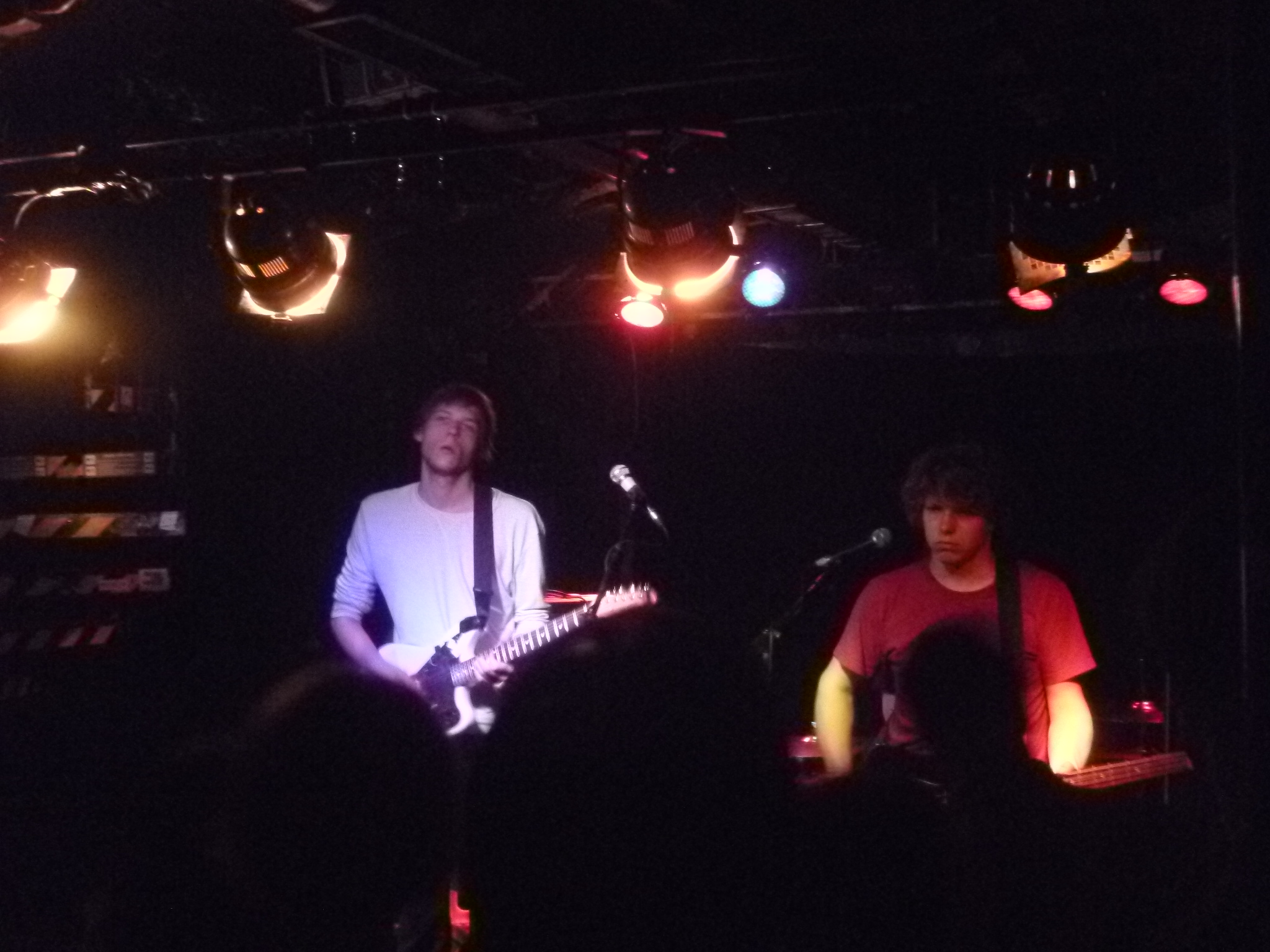
Die Nerven live im Trierer Exil

Die Nerven (English: "The Nerves") is a German rock band.

The band, hailing from Stuttgart. Die Nerven combine a mix of various punk, post-punk styles and indie rock.

Their debut album Fun (2014) was described by Der Spiegel as "one of the most important and best German-language records in this decade". It received the grada 9.0 out of 10, with Die Nerven (2022) coming in even stronger with a 9.2 score.

Their albums consistently scored 7 or 8 (out of 10) from Plattentests.de.

The sixth album, Wir waren hier, was released on September 13, 2024. The magazine Der Berliner described the album as "Electrifying noise-rock, opulently produced". The German Rolling Stone also praised it, among others with 4.5 of 5.

In 2025 their live-record Live im Elfenbeinturm was released on Glitterhouse Records. The record received overall good reviews and scored 8 out of 10 from Plattentests.de as well as 10 out of 12 from Visions Magazine. The Cover Artwork shows a photography of the band from the German artist Tim Bruening. It's their second live record.

== Personnel ==
- Max Rieger – vocals, guitar
- Julian Knoth – bass, vocals
- Kevin Kuhn – drums
