= Immergut Festival =

Music festival in Germany

Coordinates: 53°20′9″N 13°2′50″E

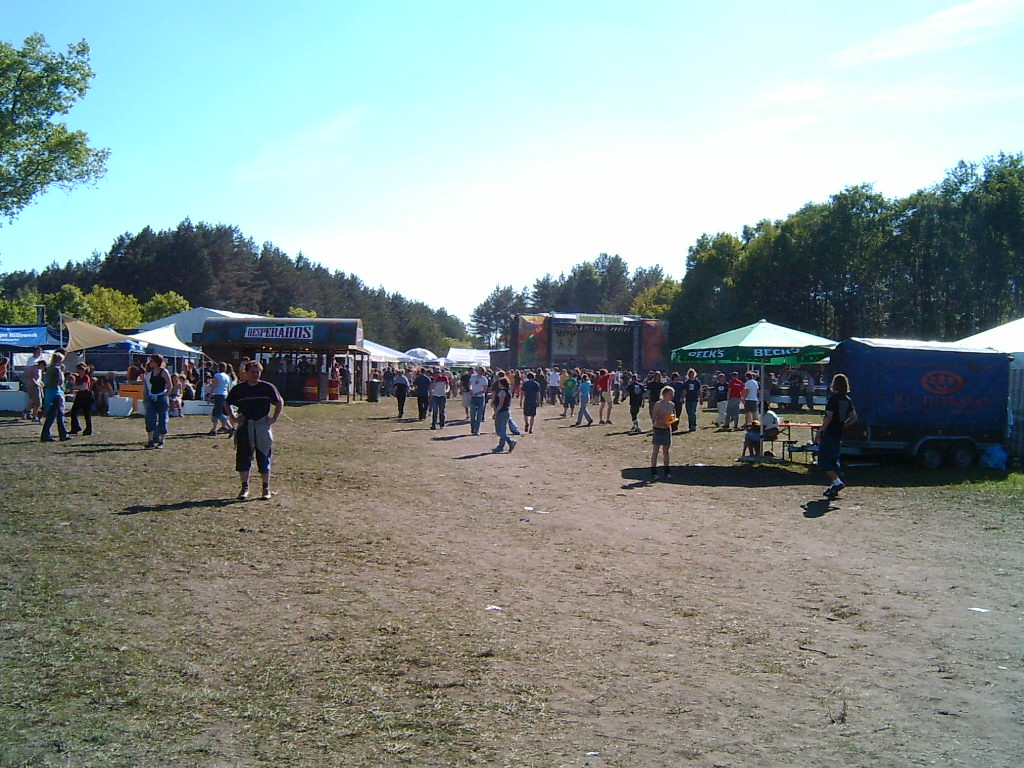
Immergut Festival

The Immergut Festival is a yearly music festival in Germany in Neustrelitz, Mecklenburg-Vorpommern. The first edition was organised in 2000. The festival focuses mainly on indie rock and is one of the largest festivals in Germany for this genre.

== Line-ups ==
- 2000: Beatsteaks, Die Jones, Luke, Nevis, Pale, Porous, Pussybox, Readymade, Samba, Soulmate, Sportfreunde Stiller, Sweet Zoe, Tricky Lobsters, Virginia Jetzt!, Seesaw
- 2001: Donots, Blackmail, Readymade, Miles, Slut, Beatsteaks, Tom Liwa, Tomte, Sofaplanet, Eskobar, Pale, Porous, Virginia Jetzt!, Friends of Dean Martinez, Sportfreunde Stiller
- 2002: Aerogramme, Astra Kid, Beatsteaks, Bernd Begemann, Das Pop, Die Sterne, Dyade, Kettcar, MIA., One Man and his Droid, Pluxus, Samba, Scumbucket, Solarscape, Soulmate, The Monochords, The Soundtrack of our Lives, Tocotronic, Tomte
- 2003: Therapy?, Console, Readymade, Miles, Pale, Slut, Fireside, Kante, Superpunk, Blackmail, Virginia Jetzt!, The Robocop Kraus, Pelzig, Chokebore, Cursive
- 2004: The Notwist, The Weakerthans, Adam Green, Broken Social Scene, Kettcar, Tomte, Tele, Porous, Tiger Lou, Bernd Begemann, Naked Lunch, Lali Puna, Marr
- 2005: Maxïmo Park, Nada Surf, Deichkind, Moneybrother, Puppetmastaz, Kante, The Album Leaf, Koufax, The Robocop Kraus, Last Days of April, Boxhamsters, Madsen, Kate Mosh, Angelika Express
- 2006: Broken Social Scene, Blumfeld, Tomte, Yeah Yeah Yeahs, Art Brut, Die Regierung, MIA., Okkervil River, The Appleseed Cast, Pale, Klez.e, Flowerpornoes, Phantom/Ghost, Fotos, Midlake, Mew, Luke
- 2007: Polarkreis 18, Muff Potter, Tele, Friska Viljor, Shout Out Louds, Naked Lunch, Architecture in Helsinki, Malajube, Tocotronic, Tied & Tickled Trio, Someone Still Loves You Boris Yeltsin, Virginia Jetzt!, Ragazzi, Sophia, Superpunk, Lichter, Seidenmatt
- 2008: Studio Braun, Get Well Soon, iLiKETRAiNS, Slut, Louie Austen, The Weakerthans, The Audience, Ólafur Arnalds, The Notwist, Microstern, PeterLicht, Blood Red Shoes, Johnossi, Lo-Fi-Fnk, Menomena, The Lemonheads, Trip Fontaine, Cartridge, Fotos, Girls in Hawaii
- 2009: The Whitest Boy Alive, Polarkreis 18, Die Sterne, Samba, Bodi Bill, Hello Saferide, Hundreds, Jeans Team, Kettcar, Olli Schulz, Pale, Sometree, The Soundtrack of our Lives, Tilman Rossmy, Timid Tiger, Tomte, Virginia Jetzt!, Frittenbude
- 2010: Jens Friebe, Everything Everything, Vierkanttretlager, Official Secret Act, We Were Promised Jetpacks, The Go! Team, Bonaparte, The Kissaway Trail, Ja, Panik, Rocko Schamoni, Chikinki, Mediengruppe Telekommander, Efterklang, Two Door Cinema Club, Tokyo Police Club, FM Belfast, My Awesome Mixtape, I Heart Sharks
- 2011: Ariane Grundies, Balthazar, Brandt Brauer Frick, Chuckamuck, The Crookes, Darwin Deez, dEUS, Erobique, Frank Spilker, Gisbert zu Knyphausen, Hans Unstern & Band, Herrenmagazin, Jason Collett, Jürgen Kuttner, Lea Groß, Lisa Hofmann & Johanna Lucklum, Lissy-Therea Willberg, Martina Hoffmann, Michael Kellenbenz, Mogwai, Nagel, Nôze, Ra Ra Riot, Retro Stefson, Sarah Domann, Station 17, Those Dancing Days, Tino Hanekamp, Touchy Mob, Ulrike Jäger, Waters, Who Knew
- 2012: Alle Farben, Blood Red Shoes, Die Höchste Eisenbahn, Die Vögel, Einar Stray, Francis International Airport, Friska Viljor, Hauschka, Heinz Strunk, Hundreds, Immanu El, Kakkmaddafakka, Leif Randt, Me And My Drummer, New Build, Pupkulies & Rebecca, Sandro Perri, Sin Fang, Slagsmalsklubben, Sóley, Tall Ships, The Hidden Cameras, The Hundred in the Hands, The Mouse Folk, Tiere Streicheln Menschen, Totally Enormous Extinct Dinosaurs, Vierkanttretlager, WhoMadeWho
- 2013: Beach Fossils, Christian Löffler, David Jonathan, Die Heiterkeit, Dry The River, Efterklang, Fenster, Fraktus, Gold Panda, Honig, Jens Lekman, Karrera Klub, La Boum Fatalle ft. Thomalla, Leslie Clio, Roosevelt, Royal Canoe, Team Me, The Notwist, The Vaccines, Toy, We Were Promised Jetpacks, When Saints Go Machine, White Fence, Xul Zolar, Young Dreams
- 2014: All The Luck In The World, Bonaparte, Cloud Nothings, Die! Die! Die!, Einar Stray, Feine Sahne Fischfilet, Felix Scharlau, FM Belfast, Future Islands, Girls in Hawaii, Hundreds, Jan Roth, Judith Holofernes, Justus Köhncke, Karrera Klub (DJ-Team), Kombinat 100, Kommando Tanzbrause (DJ-Team), La Femme, Lucy Rose, Moddi, Mozes And The Firstborn, Oum Shatt, Paul Bokowski (reading), Rah Rah, Real Estate, Robag Wruhme, SeaChange, Slut, Sven Regener (reading), Tiere streicheln Menschen (reading), Wye Oak
- 2015: Erlend Øye, Element Of Crime, Battles, Ωracles / Oracles, Die Nerven, Gereon Klug & Maurice Summen (reading), Ducktails, The/Das, Von Spar, Jonas Alaska, Balthazar, Trümmer, Occupanther, Fil, Jacob Korn, TOPS, Beaty Heart, King Khan And The Shrines, Francesco Wilking, Moritz Krämer, Missincat, Zentralheizung of Death, Ghostpoet, Drenge, Sticky Fingers, Linus Volkmann, Egokind & Ozean
- 2016: Get Well Soon, Schnipo Schranke, We Are The City, PeterLicht, Maurice Summen, SUUNS, Isolation Berlin, Stefanie Sargnagel, Jochen Distelmeyer, Vita Bergen, Tocotronic, Maxïmo Park, LUH., Drangsal, Sean Nicholas Savage, Peter Bjorn and John, Fat White Family, Coma, Is Tropical, Nagel & Manuel Möglich, Frankie Cosmos, White Wine Music, Liima, DJ Phono, Eddie Argos von Art Brut
- 2017: Portugal. The Man, Broken Social Scene, Local Natives, Shout Out Louds, Angel Olsen, Die Höchste Eisenbahn, Mew, Die Sterne, Bernd Begemann, Motorama (band), Christian Löffler, Sinkane, !!!, Giant Rooks, Fazerdaze, Dan Croll, Homeshake, Lea Porcelain, Cuthead, Wand, Friends of Gas, Kalipo, $ick (Shore, Stein, Papier), Preoccupations, Julien Baker, Voodoo Jürgens, Schorsch Kamerun, Ronja von Rönne, Jens Balzer
- 2018: Ada, Anja Rützel, Bayonne, Christiane Rösinger (reading), Das Paradies, Die Nerven, Drangsal, Fil Bo Riva, Granadamusik, Gurr, Ilgen-Nur, Kat Frankie, Kero Kero Bonito, Kettcar, Lambert, Makeness, Maurice & Die Familie Summen, Mourn, Olli Schulz, Pom Poko, Roosevelt, Sam Vance-Law, Suff Daddy & The Lunch Birds, Ty Segall
- 2019: Alli Neumann, Balthazar, Bilderbuch, Black Midi, Blvth, Boy Harsher, Cate Le Bon, Dagobert, Deerhunter, Dena, Die Wände, Fenster, Fontaines D.C., Frittenbude, Gewalt Band, Giulia Becker, Heinz Strunk, Hope, International Music, Isolation Berlin, Isolée, Kala Brisella, Karen Gwyer, Karies, Komfortrauschen, Kommode, Lauer, Leoniden, Linus Volkmann, Mavi Phoenix, Monako, Nilüfer Yanya, Priests, Roosevelt, Shelter Boy, Some Sprouts, Sophia Kennedy
- 2020: Canceled due to the COVID-19 pandemic.
- 2021: Ätna, Drangsal, Hundreds, Ilgen-Nur, Kaltenkirchen, Pabst, Rikas, Shari Vari, Sofia Portanet, THALA, Albertine Sarges, Blond, DJ Fart in the Club, Giant Rooks, José González, Juliane Streich, Kat Frankie, L.A. Salami, M. Byrd, Molchat Doma, Paula Irmschler (mit Nina Kummer), Sarah Farina, Voodoo Beach, Alyona Alyona, Drens, Dino Brandão, Grandbrothers, Hendrik Otremba, Ikan Hyu, Jens Balzer, June Cocó, Los Bitchos, Odd Couple, Paramida, Sorry3000, Tocotronic
- 2022: Black Country, New Road, Danger Dan, My Ugly Clementine, Penelope Isles, Sam Vance-Law, Shame, Benjamin Fredrichs (reading), Christin Nichols, Crack Cloud, Das Paradies, Daði Freyr, Dekker, DJ Boring, IAMKIMKONG, Ilona Hartmann (reading), International Music, Jessy Lanza, Juse Ju, Keke (cancelled, replaced by Dilla), Lucy Kruger & The Lost Boys, Luisa Neubauer (reading), Mattiel, Meskerem Mees, Mind Enterprises, Mine, Nalan, Nand, Noga Erez, Power Plush, Sharktank, Sophia Kennedy, Team Scheisse, Tobias Ginsburg, Young Marco
- 2023
- 2024
