= Hurricane Festival =

German music festival

Coordinates: 53°09′34″N 9°31′21″E

- Genre: Rock, indie, electro
- Dates: June
- Locations: Scheeßel, Germany
- Years active: 1973 as Es rockt in der Heide; 1977 as First Rider Open Air; 1997–present as Hurricane Festival
- Attendance: 80,000 (2022)
- Website: hurricane.de

The Hurricane Festival, also just Hurricane, is a music festival that has taken place at the Eichenring, a speedway race track, in Scheeßel, Germany, since 1997. With more than 80,000 attendees (2022) it is one of the largest music festivals in Germany. The event plays a mix of rock, alternative, pop and electro music from established as well as emerging artists.

Southside Festival, often referred to as Hurricane's "sister" festival, takes place on the same three days every June and has largely the same line-up. Both are organised by FKP Konzertproduktionen, MCT Agentur and KoKo Konstanz.

== History ==
=== The 1973 and 1977 festivals ===
The first festival in Scheeßel took place on 8 and 9 September 1973 and was called "Es rockt in der Heide" (English: It's rocking in the heath). The festival hosted many of the big names in rock music at the time (Chuck Berry, Jerry Lee Lewis, Chicago, Manfred Mann's Earth Band, Lou Reed) and carried on through Monday night thanks to the enthusiasm of the bands.

The 1977 festival, this time called First Rider Open Air, which took place on 3 and 4 September incurred damage costs of 1.5 Million when the organiser who realised during the planning stages that it wouldn't be possible to pay the bands, ran off with the rest of the money. The name "First Rider Open Air" is a reference to the packaging for Rider in Blue Jeans rolling tobacco which was new at the time. The Dutch tobacco manufacturer Douwe Egberts sponsored the festival for DM140,000 under the condition that the name of the tobacco was used. Some of the bands that had been announced including Nektar and The Byrds did not even arrive in Scheeßel in some cases it was because the payment of travel expenses had not been ensured and in other cases it was due to the fact the extremely inexperienced event organiser (a 25 year old bank clerk) had already paid in advance some bands in full who then did not turn up at all. Dutch band Long Tall Ernie & The Shakers opened on the first night which then ended with Golden Earring playing their song Radar Love. Hells Angels who were hired as stewards collectively abandoned their duties due to a lack of payment. After a while the fans who felt conned and the stewards who had been cheated of their pay set the stage and the organiser's trailers on fire. Equipment and instruments were destroyed. In addition to those already mentioned bands Van der Graaf Generator and Colosseum II and British progressive rock group Camel also performed. Electro artist Klaus Schulze had also been ready to go on stage and perform before the fire. Originally Steppenwolf and Ray Manzarek (the pianist from The Doors) had been set to perform. Some people were injured from falling parts of the steel scaffolding. Those affected were then immediately dealt with by the emergency services. Following the major's orders the rock festival in Scheeßel was temporarily terminated.

=== Reestablishment 1997 ===
In 1997 a festival in Scheeßel was resumed under a new city mayor and renamed Hurricane Festival. With the help of a local company, the event organiser Folkert Koopmans (FKP Scorpio) succeeded in convincing the Scheeßel city administration to resume the festival. Around 20,000 people attended the first Hurricane Festival on 21 and 22 June 1997 where the headliners were Rammstein, INXS and Bad Religion; the event did not make any profit. Koopmans had calculated that if there were 12,000 attendees then he would break even. 36 bands performed over the two days across two stages, a main stage and a smaller one which were both in tents. Since there were 9,000 more attendees than expected who wanted to stay overnight on the site, land from the neighbouring farm was converted last minute to camping grounds.

=== Attendance increase and extension of the site ===
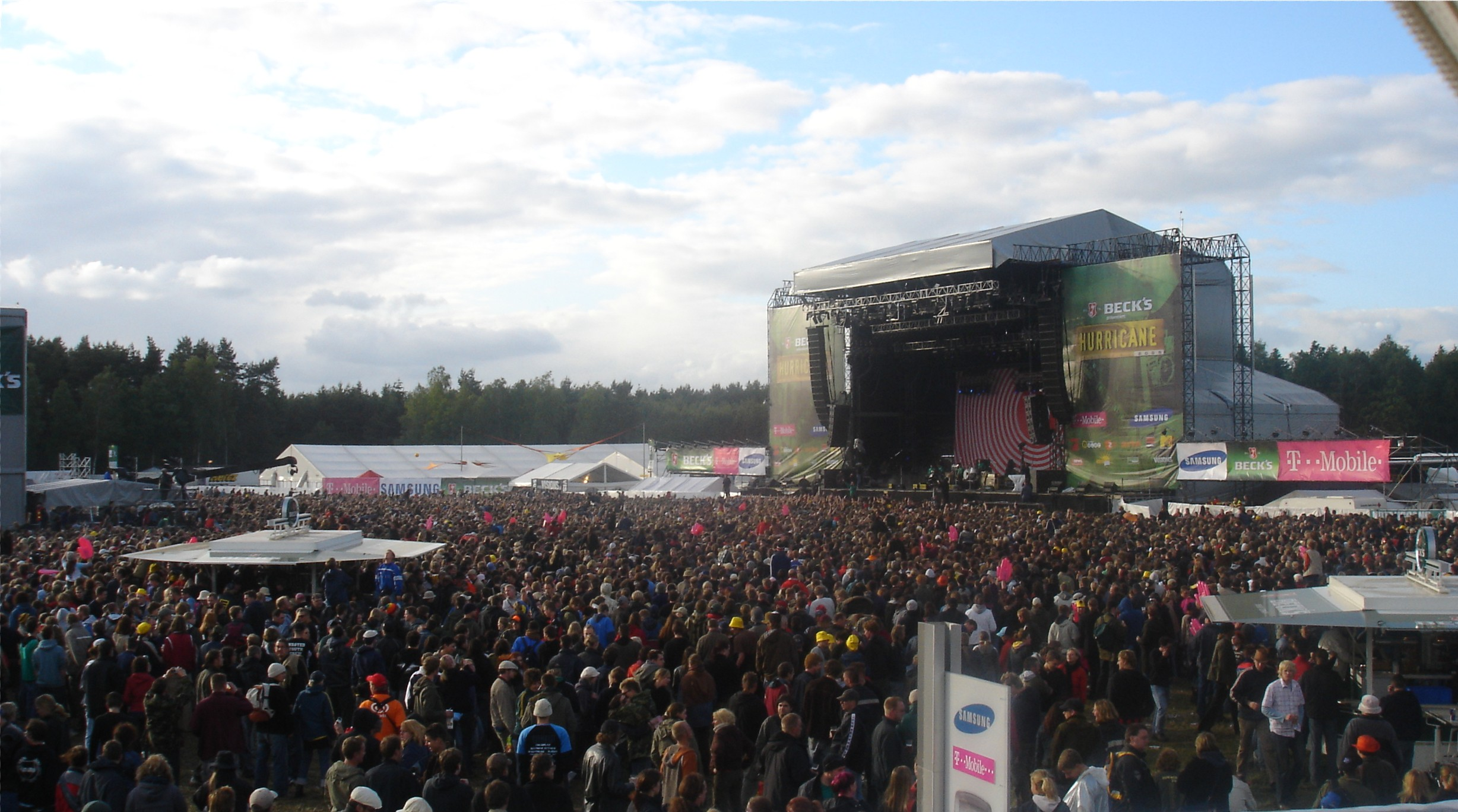
The Beatsteaks playing at on the "Green Stage" in 2005

In only its second year the number of attendees at the festival was more than double that of the first, with a total of 40,000 and over the following years it would could continue to increase. A new record was reached in 2002 with 52,000 attendees. During the initial years (the exception being 2000) bands played over two days (Saturday and Sunday) but since 2003 the festival has taken place over three days (Friday, Saturday and Sunday).

In 2004 a second open-air stage was built opposite the other which caused an unpleasant sound cross-over. The same year David Bowie performed at the festival. After his performance Bowie complained of having difficulties with his heart and underwent emergency operation in Hamburg overnight. His performance at the sister festival Southside was subsequently cancelled. His performance at Hurricane was the last time Bowie performed live. Except for the occasional guest performance, Bowie made no more stage appearances before his death in January 2016.

In 2005 the festival sold out, selling more than 60,000 tickets, however, some attendees complained about this because it meant the camping area as well as the grounds themselves were overcrowded. As a result, the following year the number of tickets sold was reduced to 50,000; they sold out two months before the festival. For safety reasons crowd surfing was also forbidden. 90 minutes before the official end of the 2006 festival saw the worst storm the festival has experienced to date. Gusts with wind force of 11 and rainfall up to 30 litres per square metre meant the festival had to be abandoned and damaged numerous tents and pavilions. Parts of the camping area was knee high under water and therefore led many attendees to find emergency shelter in the disco tent. Owing to an increase in area both for camping and for the stages the number of tickets for 2007 was raised back to 60,000. The second stage (the blue stage) was moved out of the Eichenring. In 2008 the festival sold out shortly before the date, this time with 70,000 attendees.

=== Developments since 2009 ===
In 2009 Hurricane did not sell out for the first time in a while. Headliners of the 13th festival on the Green Stage were Kings of Leon, Faith No More and Die Ärzte and on the Blue Stage Kraftwerk, Nick Cave and the Bad Seeds and Nine Inch Nails were the main acts. Faith No More's performance was one of only a handful in Europe and some fans travelled from Greece, the UK and Australia to be there.

In 2010 a fourth stage was built, the White Stage, which is reserved for Electro music.

Since 2011 festival goers have been able to use a mobile app (on Android and iOS) to access information on the bands (performance times, stages and other info) as well receive updates on the festival. It is also possible to receive information by text. In 2011 a mobile phone charging service was offered to campers with no source of electricity as a form of advertising and attracted long queues and in the same year a "Green" camping area was also available for the first time.

In 2012 the Red Stage which had only been introduced a few years before was no longer inside a tent but became the third open-air stage instead. The festival sold out at the beginning of May. 2013 saw a record in the sale of tickets during the first stages of release as all 73,000 tickets were already sold by the end of March.

Since 2013 Spanish artist Dani Blázquez has created each year a new design for Hurricane. In 2013 it was a pink owl, 2014 a blue wolf, 2015 a green boar, 2016 a red fox, 2017 a green bear, 2018 a purple lynx and in 2019 a green racoon. The stylish animal's eye colour differs from the eye colour used in the designs at Hurricane's sister festival Southside. The design is used: to display on the stage screen when no acts are performing; as the wallpaper for the Hurricane-App and on the internet; as well as in many places around the festival grounds on banners.

After the 2014 festival also sold out before the weekend, selling 73,000 Combitickets, 2015 was the first non sell-out in several years with around 65,000 attendees. According to the organisers this was due to the strong competition from other festivals that year and the subsequent weaker headliner line-up (Placebo, Florence + the Machine, Materia). In addition in the same year an elaborate contactless payment system was used on site rather than cash.

On 23 February 2016, the event organisers announced that all 73,000 Combitickets for that year's festival had sold out. On the very first day of the festival there was a two-hour disruption due to a thunder storm warning. The event organisers were particularly aware after a lightning strike injured 21 people at the festival Rock am Ring, which was then terminated early. On the second day of the festival the opening of the festival grounds was initially delayed and then later in the evening completely cancelled. During the night of 25 June 2016 along with specialist groups from the THW, Technisches Hilfswerk (a German governmental civil protection group), the fire service and some staff, the organisers of the event drained the land, they pumped water away and distributed straw and gravel. The site was then able to be open as normal on the Sunday.

== Facts and figures ==
Year	Dates	Tickets sold	Ticket price	Number of bands	Headliners
1997	21–22 June	20,000	€30.17 (59 DM)	36	INXS, Rammstein, Bad Religion, Midnight Oil
1998	20–21 June	40,000	€40.39 (79 DM)	39	Beastie Boys, Björk, Iggy Pop, Garbage
1999	26–27 June	45,000	€40.39 (79 DM)	38	Marilyn Manson, Massive Attack, Skunk Anansie, Blur, Bush
2000	24–25 June	35,000	€45.50 (89 DM)	44	Nine Inch Nails, Bush, Skunk Anansie
2001	23–24 June	40,000	€60.84 (119 DM)	39	Die Toten Hosen, Placebo, Faithless
2002	22–23 June	52,000	€72.50	39	Red Hot Chili Peppers, Die Ärzte, New Order
2003	20–22 June	45,000	€79	49	Coldplay, Massive Attack, Björk, Radiohead
2004	25–27 June	40,000	€79	46	David Bowie, The Cure, Placebo, Die Fantastischen Vier
2005	10–12 June	60,000	€89	44	Die Ärzte, Rammstein, System of a Down, Nine Inch Nails
2006	23–25 June	50,000	€89	64	The Strokes, ~~Muse~~, Manu Chao
2007	22–24 June	55,000	€109	61	Pearl Jam, Beastie Boys, Marilyn Manson
2008	20–22 June	70,000	€99 to €130	63	Radiohead, Foo Fighters, Beatsteaks
2009	19–21 June	60,000	from €99	64	Die Ärzte, Kings of Leon, Faith No More
2010	18–20 June	70,000	from €105	74	The Strokes, Beatsteaks, Billy Talent, Jack Johnson
2011	17–19 June	70,000	from €109	77	Foo Fighters, Incubus, Arcade Fire
2012	22–24 June	73,000	from €109	96	Die Ärzte, The Cure, blink-182
2013	21–23 June	73,000	from €109	98	Rammstein, Queens of the Stone Age, Arctic Monkeys
2014	20–22 June	73,000	from €109	100	Arcade Fire, Volbeat, Macklemore & Ryan Lewis, Seeed
2015	19–21 June	65,000	from €125	104	Placebo, Florence + the Machine, Marteria
2016	24–26 June	73,000	from €139	106	Rammstein, Mumford & Sons, ~~The Prodigy~~
2017	23–25 June	78,000	from €159	103	Green Day, Linkin Park, Casper
2018	22–24 June	65,000	from €159		The Prodigy, Arctic Monkeys, Arcade Fire, Billy Talent

== Past lineups ==
(lineups partly differ from Southside)

Year	Acts
1973	Argent, Buddy Miles, Chicago, Chuck Berry, Jerry Lee Lewis, East of Eden, Epitaph, Fusion Orchestra, Ian Carr w/ Nucleus, Osibisa, Karthago, Lou Reed, Manfred Mann's Earth Band, Odin, Bronco, Richie Havens, Soft Machine, Ten Years After, Vinegar Joe, Wishbone Ash, Home, Beggars Opera
1997	16 Horsepower, 311, Ani DiFranco, Armageddon Dildos, Bad Religion, Chumbawamba, Cucumber Men, Daft Punk, Deine Lakaien, Element of Crime, Fischmob, Hip Young Things, INXS, L 7, Lamb, Lecker Fischbrät, The Levellers, Manbreak, Mansun, Neneh Cherry, Peter Bruntnell, Phish, Primus, Rammstein, Rekord, Sharon Stoned, Sheryl Crow, Son Volt, The Cardigans, The Inchtabokatables, The Jinxs, The Lightning Seeds, The Men They Couldn't Hang, Thumb, Tiamat, Weltempfänger
1998	Alaska feat. Bobo, Apocalyptica, Asian Dub Foundation, Beastie Boys, Bell, Book & Candle, Björk, Chumbawamba, Dave Matthews Band, Del Amitri, Die Sterne, Garbage, Guano Apes, Hazeldine, Heather Nova, Iggy Pop, Madonna Hip Hop Massaker, Matchbox Twenty, Megaherz, Money Mark, Oomph!, Oysterband, Pop Tarts, Pulp, Rancid, Readymade, Sonic Youth, Such A Surge, The Bates, The Mighty Mighty Bosstones, The Notwist, Tito & Tarantula, Tocotronic, Torn!, trieb, Two, Vivid, Ween, Widespread Panic
1999	Blumfeld, Blur, Built to Spill, Bush, Calexico, Catatonia, dEUS, Die Fantastischen Vier, Eat No Fish, Everlast, Faithless, Goo Goo Dolls, Guano Apes, HIM, Hole, Ich-Zwerg, Kashmir, Liquido, Live, Marilyn Manson, Massive Attack, Miles, Molotov, Motorpsycho, Muse, Placebo
2000	A, Ani DiFranco, Blind Passengers, Bomfunk MC's, Bush, Die Firma, Eat No Fish, Element of Crime, Emiliana Torrini, Fink, FM Einheit feat. Gry, Fu Manchu, Gentleman, Giant Sand, Gomez, Groove Armada, HIM, Laika, Live, Lotte Ohm, Macy Gray, Madrugada, Missing Link, Moby, Nine Inch Nails, Project Pitchfork, Rico, Rollins Band, Sandy Dillon, Skunk Anansie, Station 17, Surrogat, The Cranberries, The Tea Party, Therapy?, Tonic, Uncle Ho
2001	Fünf Sterne deluxe, American Hi-Fi, Ash, Backyard Babies, Blackmail, Blumfeld, Deftones, Die Toten Hosen, Donots, Faithless, Fantômas, Fink, Goldfinger, Grand Theft Audio, H-Blockx, Iggy Pop, Incubus, Jan Delay und die Sam Ragga Band, Jimmy Eat World, JJ72, Krezip, K's Choice, Last Days of April, Nashville Pussy, OPM, Paradise Lost, Phoenix, Placebo, Queens of the Stone Age, Stereo MCs, Superpunk, The Hellacopters, The Hives, The Offspring, The Weakerthans, Thomas D, Tool, Weezer, Wheatus
2002	...And You Will Know Us by the Trail of Dead, 4Lyn, A, Beatsteaks, Black Rebel Motorcycle Club, Die Happy, Die Ärzte, Dover, Emil Bulls, Fettes Brot, Garbage, Gluecifer, Heyday, Jasmin Tabatabai, Kane, Lambretta, Less Than Jake, Lostprophets, Madrugada, Mercury Rev, Nelly Furtado, New Order, No Doubt, Queens of the Stone Age, Readymade, Red Hot Chili Peppers, Rival Schools, Simple Plan, Soulfly, Sportfreunde Stiller, Such A Surge, Television, The (International) Noise Conspiracy, The Breeders, The Flaming Sideburns, The Notwist, The Promise Ring, Tocotronic, Zornik
2003	22-20s, Anouk, Apocalyptica, Asian Dub Foundation, Beth Gibbons and Rustin Man, Björk, Blackmail, Brendan Benson, Cellophane Suckers, Coldplay, Console, Counting Crows, Danko Jones, Fu Manchu, Goldfrapp, Good Charlotte, Grandaddy, Guano Apes, GusGus, International Pony, Interpol, Kettcar, Massive Attack, Millencolin, Moloko, Nada Surf, NOFX, Patrice, Pinkostar, Radiohead, Röyksopp, Seeed, Sigur Rós with Amina, Skin, Slut, Starsailor, Supergrass, The Datsuns, The Hellacopters, The Mighty Mighty Bosstones, The Roots, The Sounds, Therapy?, Tocotronic, Turbonegro, Underwater Circus, Underworld, Union Youth, Venus Hum
2004	Fünf Sterne deluxe, Air, Amplifier, Anti-Flag, Ash, Backyard Babies, Beatsteaks, Beginner, Billy Talent, Black Rebel Motorcycle Club, Breed 77, Bright Eyes, Colour of Fire, Cypress Hill, Danko Jones, David Bowie, Die Fantastischen Vier, Die Happy, Donots, Dropkick Murphys, Fireball Ministry, Franz Ferdinand, Gentleman & the Far East Band, Gluecifer, Graham Coxon, I Am Kloot, Ill Niño, Life of Agony, Mando Diao, Mclusky, Modest Mouse, Mogwai, Monster Magnet, Pixies, P J Harvey, Placebo, Sarah Bettens, Snow Patrol, Sportfreunde Stiller, The (International) Noise Conspiracy, The Bones, The Cure, The Hives, Tiger Beat, Tomte, Wilco, Within Temptation
2005	3 Doors Down, ...And You Will Know Us by the Trail of Dead, Ashton!, Audioslave, Beatsteaks, Beck, Boysetsfire, Brendan Benson, Broken Social Scene, Die Ärzte, Dinosaur Jr., Eagles of Death Metal, Fantômas, Feist, Flogging Molly, Ken, Kettcar, La Vela Puerca, Madrugada, Madsen, Millencolin, Moneybrother, New Order, Nine Inch Nails, Oasis, Olli Schulz, Phoenix, Queens of the Stone Age, Rammstein, Sarah Bettens, Ska-P, Slut, System of a Down, Team Sleep, The Dresden Dolls, The Eighties Matchbox B-Line Disaster, The Stands, Turbonegro, Underøath (ausgefallen), Wir sind Helden
2006	Adam Green, Apocalyptica, Archive, Arctic Monkeys, Backyard Babies, Ben Harper & the Innocent Criminals, Billy Talent, Blackmail, Boozed, Collective Soul, Death Cab for Cutie, dEUS, Donavon Frankenreiter, Duels, Eagles of Death Metal, Elbow, Element of Crime, Everlaunch, Fettes Brot, Gnarls Barkley (Cancelled due to bad weather), Gods of Blitz, Gogol Bordello, Hard-Fi, Karamelo Santo, Klee, Lagwagon, Live, Mad Caddies, Mando Diao, Manu Chao Radio Bemba Sound System, Maxïmo Park, Nada Surf, Muse (Cancelled due to bad weather), Ohrbooten, The Weepies, The Pale, Panteón Rococó, Pete Blume, Photonensurfer, Pretty Girls Make Graves, Scissors For Lefty, Serena Maneesh, Seeed, She-Male Trouble, Shout Out Louds, Sigur Rós, Skin, Smoke Blow, The Brian Jonestown Massacre, The Cardigans, The Cooper Temple Clause, The Feeling, The Gossip, The Answer, The Hives, The Kooks, The Raconteurs, The Sounds, The Strokes, Tomte, Two Gallants, Voltaire, Wir sind Helden, Within Temptation (Cancelled due to bad weather), Zebrahead
2007	Aereogramme, Arcade Fire, Beastie Boys, Bloc Party, The Blood Brothers, The Bravery, Bright Eyes, Bromheads Jacket, Cold War Kids, Deichkind, Dropkick Murphys, Editors, Five O'Clock Heroes, Frank Black, Dendemann, Die Fantastischen Vier, The Films, Fotos, The Good, the Bad & the Queen, The Hold Steady, Howling Bells, Incubus, Interpol, Isis, Johnossi, Juliette and the Licks, Karpatenhund, Kings of Leon, La Vela Puerca, Less Than Jake, Manic Street Preachers, Marilyn Manson, Me First and the Gimme Gimmes, Mutemath, Modest Mouse, Mogwai, Ohrbooten, Pearl Jam, Placebo, Porcupine Tree, Queens of the Stone Age, Snow Patrol, Sonic Youth, State Radio, Sugarplum Fairy, Super 700, Tokyo Police Club, Virginia Jetzt!
2008	Apoptygma Berzerk, Bat For Lashes, Beatsteaks, Biffy Clyro, Billy Talent, Black Rebel Motorcycle Club, Blackmail, British Sea Power, Calexico, Deichkind, Die Mannequin, Digitalism, Does It Offend You, Yeah?, Donots, Elbow, Enter Shikari, Flogging Molly, Foals, Foo Fighters, Jaguar Love, Jan Delay & Disko No 1, Jason Mraz, Jennifer Rostock, Kaiser Chiefs, Kettcar, Krieger, Maxïmo Park, Millencolin, Monster Magnet, Nada Surf, NoFX, Oceansize, Operator Please, Panic! at the Disco, Panteón Rococó, Patrice, Radiohead, Razorlight, Rise Against, Rodrigo y Gabriela, Shantel & Bucovina Club Orkestar, Sigur Rós, Slut, Tegan and Sara, The Beautiful Girls, The Chemical Brothers, The Cribs, The Enemy, The (International) Noise Conspiracy, The Kooks, The Pigeon Detectives, The Notwist, The Subways, The Weakerthans, The Wombats, Tocotronic, Turbostaat and Xavier Rudd.
2009	Anti-Flag, Auletta, Ben Harper and Relentless7, Blood Red Shoes, Bosse, Brand New, Clueso, Culcha Candela, Datarock, Dendemann, Die Ärzte, Die Fischer, Disturbed, Duffy, Eagles Of Death Metal, Editors, Eskimo Joe, Everlaunch, Faith No More, Fettes Brot, Fleet Foxes, Frank Turner, Franz Ferdinand, Friendly Fires, Get Well Soon, Glasvegas, Gogol Bordello, Johnossi, Joshua Radin, Just Jack, Karamelo Santo, Katy Perry, Keane, Kings Of Leon, Kraftwerk, Ladyhawke, Less Than Jake, Lily Allen, Lovedrug, Lykke Li, Moby, Nick Cave And The Bad Seeds, Nine Inch Nails, Nneka, No Use For A Name, Paulo Nutini, Pixies, Portugal. The Man, Silversun Pickups, Ska-P, Social Distortion, The Alexandria Quartet, The Asteroids Galaxy Tour, The Dø, The Gaslight Anthem, The Horrors, The Living End, The Mars Volta, The Rakes, The Sounds, The Ting Tings, The Whip, The Wombats, Tomte
2010	Alberta Cross, Archive, Ash, Band Of Skulls, Beatsteaks, Biffy Clyro, Bigelf, Billy Talent, Bonaparte, Boys Noize (performance cancelled), Bratze, Charlie Winston, Coheed And Cambria, Cosmo Jarvis, Cymbals Eat Guitars, Danko Jones, Deftones, Deichkind, Dendemann, Does It Offend You, Yeah?, Donots, Dropkick Murphys, Element of Crime, Enter Shikari, Erol Alkan (performance cancelled), Faithless, Florence and the Machine, FM Belfast, Frank Turner, Frittenbude, Good Shoes, HORSE the Band, Hot Water Music, Ignite, Jack Johnson, Jennifer Rostock, Kap Bambino, Kashmir, Katzenjammer, K's Choice, La Roux, LaBrassBanda, LCD Soundsystem, Local Natives, Madsen, Mando Diao, Marina And The Diamonds, Massive Attack, Moneybrother, Mr. Oizo, Paramore, Phoenix featuring Richard Conwaaaaay, Porcupine Tree, Revolverheld, Shout Out Louds, Skindred, Skunk Anansie, Stone Temple Pilots, Tegan and Sara, The Blackout, The Bloody Beetroots, The Gaslight Anthem, The Get Up Kids, The Hold Steady, The Prodigy, The Specials, The Strokes, The Temper Trap, The XX, Timid Tiger, Turbostaat, Two Door Cinema Club, Vampire Weekend, We Are Scientists, White Lies, Zebrahead
2011	All Time Low, An Horse, Arcade Fire, Arctic Monkeys, Artig (Schooljam-Gewinner), A-Trak, Band of Horses, Blood Red Shoes, Boysetsfire, Bright Eyes, British Sea Power, Brother, Chase & Status, Cloud Control, Clueso, Comeback Kid, Converge, Crookers, Crystal Fighters, Darwin Deez, Digitalism live, Eels, Egotronic, Elbow, Evaline, Everything Everything, Flogging Molly, Foo Fighters, Friendly Fires, Frittenbude, Glasvegas, Gogol Bordello, Hercules and Love Affair, I Am Kloot, I Blame Coco, Incubus, Irie Révoltés, Jimmy Eat World, Johnossi, Jupiter Jones, Kaiser Chiefs, Kaizers Orchestra, Kasabian, Kashmir, Klaxons, Kvelertak, Letlive, Lykke Li, Miles Kane, Monster Magnet, My Chemical Romance, Parkway Drive, Pete & The Pirates, Portishead, Portugal. The Man, Pulled Apart By Horses, Selig, Sick of it All, Sick Puppies, Sublime With Rome, Suede, Sum 41, Tame Impala, The Asteroids Galaxy Tour, The Chemical Brothers, The Hives, The Kills, The Sounds, The Subways, The Vaccines, The Wombats, Trentemøller, Tusq, Twin Atlantic, Two Door Cinema Club, Wakey!Wakey!, Warpaint, William Fitzsimmons, Yoav, You Me At Six, Young Rebel Set
2012	Die Ärzte, The Cure, Blink-182, Justice live, Rise Against, The Stone Roses, Mumford & Sons, Sportfreunde Stiller, The Kooks, The xx, New Order, Noel Gallagher's High Flying Birds, Wolfmother, LaBrassBanda, Casper, Katzenjammer, Kettcar, The Mars Volta, The Shins, Broilers, Florence and The Machine, Madsen, Garbage, Thees Uhlmann & Band, Eagles Of Death Metal, The Temper Trap, Beirut, Bosse, Bonaparte, Boy, Kraftklub, Ed Sheeran, K.I.Z, City And Colour, Bat For Lashes, Jennifer Rostock, Frank Turner & The Sleeping Souls, Royal Republic, Pennywise, Lagwagon, M83, Hot Water Music, Mad Caddies, La Vela Puerca, Kakkmaddafakka, The Vaccines, Less Than Jake, Zebrahead, My Morning Jacket, All Shall Perish, My Morning Jacket, The Dø, Adept, Selah Sue, The Bronx, La Dispute, Little Dragon, Disco Ensemble, Band Of Skulls, GusGus, Nneka, Bombay Bicycle Club, M.Ward, Die Antwoord, Spector, Black Box Revelation, Young Guns, Other Lives, Twin Shadow, The Computers, Nerina Pallot, Switchfoot, Eastern Conference Champions, Kurt Vile & The Violators, All The Young, Hoffmaestro, Golden Kanine, Turbowolf, We Are Augustines, Willy Moon, Alt-J, Casting Louis White Stage: Fritz Kalkbrenner, Steve Aoki, Sebastian, Beardyman, Busy P, Bassnectar, Azari & III, Supershirt, Bratze, Dumme Jungs
2013	Alt-J, Âme, Archive, Arctic Monkeys, Arkells, Ben Howard, Billy Talent, Bloc Party, Boysetsfire, Breakbot live, British Sea Power, C2C, Callejon, Chase & Status, City and Colour, Converge, Danko Jones, Darwin Deez, Deap Vally, Deichkind, Editors, Every Time I Die, Fidlar, FM Belfast, Frank Turner, Frightened Rabbit, Friska Viljor, Frittenbude, Gesaffelstein live, Get Well Soon, Gogol Bordello, Goldmouth, Grouplove, Haezer, Heisskalt, Herrenmagazin, Hudson Taylor, I Am Kloot, Irie Révoltés, Jimmy Eat World, Johnny Borrell & Zazou, Johnossi, Karnivool, Kasabian, Kashmir, Kodaline, Kvelertak, Left Boy, Macklemore & Ryan Lewis, Malleus, Marteria, Masters of Reality, Max Herre, Mikhael Paskalev, Miles Kane, Modeselektor, Netsky, NO, NOFX, Of Monsters And Men, OK Kid, Parkway Drive, Parov Stelar & Band, Passenger, Paul Kalkbrenner, Peace, Portishead, Prinz Pi, Queens Of The Stone Age, Rammstein, Ron Pope, SDP, Shout Out Louds, Sigur Rós, Ska-P, Skaters, Steven Wilson, Swim Deep, Tame Impala, Tegan Sara, The Bouncing Souls, The Devil Wears Prada, The Family Rain, The Gaslight Anthem, The Hives, The Kyteman Orchestra, The Maccabees, The National, The Smashing Pumpkins, The Stanfields, The Vaccines, The Virginmarys, Torpus & The Art Directors, Triggerfinger, Turbostaat, Two Door Cinema Club, Tyler, The Creator, Who Killed Frank
2014	Abby, Angus & Julia Stone, Apologies, I Have None, Arcade Fire, Augustines, Baauer, Bad Religion, Balthazar, Bastille, Belle & Sebastian, Bilderbuch, Blaudzun, Blood Red Shoes, Bombay Bicycle Club, Bonaparte, Bosse, Bring Me the Horizon, Broilers, Casper, Chuck Ragan, Chvrches, Circa Waves, Crookers, Current Swell, Dave Hause, Deaf Havana, Dillinger Escape Plan, Dispatch, Donots, Drenge, Dropkick Murphys, Duke Dumont, Ed Sheeran, Egotronic, Elbow, Family of the Year, Feine Sahne Fischfilet, Fettes Brot, Findus, Flogging Molly, Franz Ferdinand, Fucked Up, Fünf Sterne Deluxe, George Ezra, I Heart Sharks, Interpol, James Blake, Jennifer Rostock, Johnny Flinn, Kavinsky, Konvoy, Kraftklub, Lily Allen, London Grammar, Lykke Li, Macklemore & Ryan Lewis, Marcus Wiebusch, Marek Hemmann, Metronomy, Midlake, Moderat, Moonbootica, Panteón Rococó, Passenger, Pixies, Poliça, Razz, Reignwolf, Rodrigo Y Gabriela, Royal Blood, Samaris, Seeed, Selah Sue, Skindred, Sonic. The Machine, Station 17, The 1975, The Asteroids Galaxy Tour, The Black Keys, The Bots, The Durango Riot, Thees Uhlmann & Band, The Kooks, The Naked And Famous, The Preatures, The Sounds, The Subways, The Wombats, Tocotronic, To Kill A King, Tom Odell, Tonbandgerät, Toy, Twin Atlantic, Volbeat, We Butter the Bread with Butter, We Came As Romans, We Invented Paris, White Lies, You Me At Six, Young Rebel Set, Zebrahead
2018	8kids, Arcade Fire, Billy Talent, Marteria, Kraftklub, Justice, Broilers, Biffy Clyro, The Offspring, Beginner, Two Door Cinema Club, The Kooks, London Grammar, Franz Ferdinand, Angus & Julia Stone, Chvrches, Dendemann, Feine Sahne Fischfilet, Wanda, Madsen, George Ezra, Bonez MC, RAF Camora, NOFX, Prinz Pi, Donots, SXTN, Portugal. The Man, Boysetsfire, Pennywise, Bonaparte, Samy Deluxe, RIN, Mighty Oaks, Underoath, Fjørt, Swiss und Die Andern, Adam Angst, The Glorious Sons, Gavin James, Coasts, DMA's, Jungle, Funk Fragment, Deap Valley, Amy Shark, Parcels, Jain, Benjamin Clementine, Martin Jensen, Mike Perry, Tom Grennan, Drangsal, Jeremy Loops, Dermot Kennedy, Meute, Booka Shade, Valentino Khan, Sascha Braemer, Moonbootica, ESKEI83, Egotronic, Audio88 & Yassin, Liedfett, Radio Havanna, Leoniden, Ganz

== See also ==
- List of historic rock festivals
