= Anti Anti (Remixes) =

Single by Bonaparte vs. Markus Lange

from the album Too Much
- Released: June 5, 2009
- Genre: Techno, Electro
- Length: 57:14 (Digital download); 22:25 (Vinyl)
- Label: Freakz Me Out
- Songwriter(s): Tobias Jundt
- Producer(s): Tobias Jundt, Markus Lange

Bonaparte singles chronology
"Too Much" (2008)	"Anti Anti (Remixes)" (2009)	"Computer in Love" (2010)

Anti Anti (Remixes) is a single by the band Bonaparte in collaboration with electronic music producer Markus Lange. It offers a collection of electro, techno and minimal remixes of "Anti Anti", from the band's debut album Too Much. The single was released by Freakz Me Out label in 2009.

== Track listing ==
=== Digital download ===
1. "Anti Anti" (Markus Lange Re-Edit) – 5:57
2. "Anti Anti" (Jaimie Fanatic Remix) – 6:10
3. "Anti Anti" (Jaymo Remix) – 5:00
4. "Anti Anti" (Mimo Remix) – 5:14
5. "Anti Anti" (Stereofunk Remix) – 5:38
6. "Anti Anti" (Maxcherry Remix feat. Brian Lindsay) – 5:35
7. "Anti Anti" (K-Paul Remix) – 5:20
8. "Anti Anti" (Markus Lange Dub) – 5:55
9. "Anti Anti" (Disco Trash Music Remix) – 4:35
10. "Anti Anti" (Stevanez & Juls Remix) – 7:56

=== 12" Vinyl ===
Side A

1. "Anti Anti" (Markus Lange Re-Edit) – 5:57
2. "Anti Anti" (K-Paul Remix) – 5:20

Side B

1. "Anti Anti" (Jaymo Remix) – 5:00
2. "Anti Anti" (Jaimie Fanatic Remix) – 6:10
