= Computer in Love =

"Computer in Love" may refer to:

- a song by Perrey and Kingsley, from their 1966 album The In Sound from Way Out!
- a song by Bonaparte, from their 2010 album My Horse Likes You
