= Friska Viljor =

Friska Viljor may refer to:

- Friska Viljor (band), Swedish indie rock band
- Friska Viljor FC, Swedish football club
- IF Friska Viljor, Swedish ski club
