= Fünf Sterne deluxe =

German hip-hop band

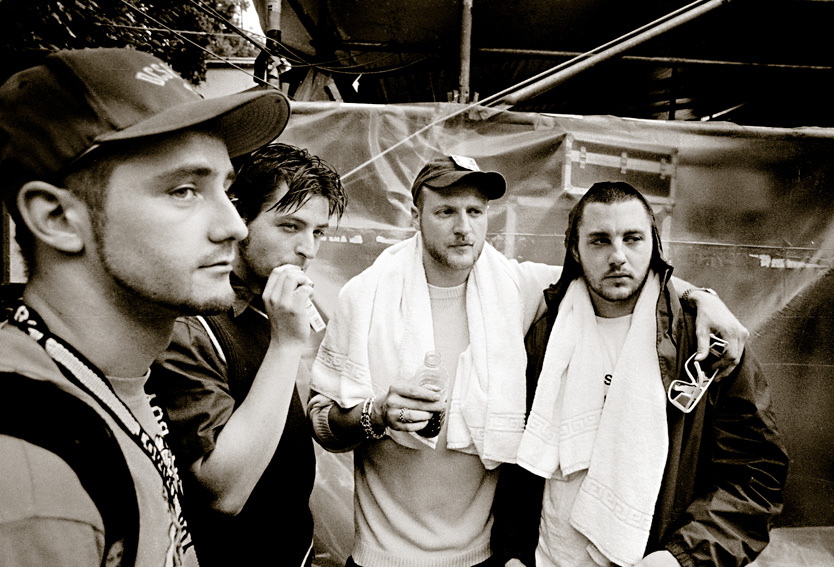
- Fünf Sterne deluxe in 1999

Background information
- Origin: Hamburg, Germany
- Genres: German hip-hop; pop-rap; boom bap
- Years active: 1997–2004, 2013–present
- Labels: Yo Mama (1998–2004); Warner Music Group (since 2015)
- Members: Das Bo; Tobi Tobsen; Luis Baltes (since 2018); DJ Coolmann (1997–2003, since 2013)
- Past members: Marcnesium (1997–2017)
- Website: forceofthenorth.com

Fünf Sterne deluxe (“Five Stars Deluxe”) is a German-language hip-hop band from Hamburg, Germany, founded in mid-1997, consisting of the rappers Das Bo (Mirko Bogojevic) and Tobi Tobsen (Tobias Schmidt), the graphic designer Marcnesium (Marc Clausen), and the disc jockey DJ Coolmann (Mario Cullmann).

The group released two full-length albums (Sillium and Neo.Now) and a number of singles and EPs until the break-up in 2004. DJ Coolmann left the band in 2003 for unknown reasons, while the remaining members continued to perform until late 2004 when the group was formally dissolved. In 2013 the original lineup performed at the “Beats auf der Bahn” festival in Hamburg. Two years later they signed a new record deal with Warner Music Group. The third album called Flash was released on 6 October 2017.

== Band history ==
In the mid 90s, Das Bo and Tobi Tobsen had already made an impression in the German hip-hop scene as Der Tobi & Das Bo with their album Genie und Wahnsinn liegen dicht beieinander and the accompanying singles "Der Racka" and "Morgen geht die Bombe hoch". Tobi had also been a member of the English-language hip-hop crew Poets of Peeze and a founding member of Fettes Brot. They released another album, Genies & Wahnsinn... (Wir sind die Best Ofs) and two further singles, "Is' mir egal" and "Wir sind die Besten", before teaming up with Marcnesium (who had been working with DJ Koze under the name Adolf Noise) and DJ Coolmann to form Fünf Sterne deluxe. Marcnesium is a professional graphic designer, who primarily worked on the visual aspects of the band and was rarely involved with the actual music production. Live, he often played a sampler and supported the two rappers with vocal samples that he modified with an attached vocoder.

=== Sillium ===
In 1998, the first Fünf Sterne deluxe album Sillium featuring the singles "5 Sterne Deluxe", "Willst du mit mir gehn" and "Dein Herz schlägt schneller" was released. Both the album and the singles entered the German charts. The lyrics of Fünf Sterne deluxe were always lighthearted, apparently never to be taken seriously and very humorous, which made them just as controversial among "real" hip-hop fans as the previous band "Der Tobi & Das Bo" had been. In numerous television appearances that year, they managed to cement their public image and confused as well as astonished audiences with their entertainment skits, which were a large part of the group's charm. Outside Fünf Sterne deluxe, DJ Coolmann took care of his own label "Hong Kong Records", and released the albums Music for Space Tourism Vol.1 (1995) and The Big Tilt (1998) under the Visit Venus moniker.

1999 saw the release of the single "Ja Ja,... deine Mudder" (the title being a German equivalent of "yo mama"), which marked a comeback after a period of relative quietness. Having already announced a solo album for the April 1998, Das Bo released an EP called "Türlich Türlich, sicher Dicker / Nur der Zorn zählt". The release coincided with the new Fünf Sterne deluxe single "Die Leude", but was more successful, selling 220,000 units and introducing Das Bo to mainstream listeners. Neo.Now, the second Fünf Sterne deluxe album, was released the same year, but only saw limited sales and did not live up to Sillium's success. Other hip-hop groups with tougher music, lyrics and attitude managed to capture more of the target audience's attention, with Fünf Sterne's more comical approach falling out of fashion. At the end of 2000, the fan club CD Alles muss raus - Die zähe Pampe aus drei Jahren Hirnforschung was released. It featured 28 unreleased tracks and remixes and came bundled with a Fünf Sterne-branded skateboard. DJ Coolmann left the band in 2003 for unknown reasons and remains an active DJ in the Hamburg club scene.

=== Further history ===
Fünf Sterne deluxe tried another comeback in 2004 with the EP "Wir sind im Haus", which failed to arouse much interest. They also performed on the Hurricane Festival for the second time after 2001. A third album was planned, the band officially folded at the end of 2004.

After a rather long creative pause, Das Bo released his solo album Best of III - Alleine in 2004, which featured the singles "Seid Ihr bereit für Das Bo" and "Ich hab Rap für Dich". It featured a rather different and mellow sound than listeners expected after the Miami bass-style Türlich Türlich... sicher Dicker of 2000. The album did not sell well and Das Bo subsequently parted ways with his record company Yo Mama. In 2005, Das Bo toured with Deichkind and made guest appearances on the singles "Wie geil ist das denn??" by Jansen & Kowalski and "Ey Yo" by DJ Tomekk. He also dissed his former record label on Samy Deluxe's mixtape "So deluxe, so glorious".

After several singles and remixes, Tobi Tobsen's electronic music project Moonbootica released a widely acclaimed album in 2005. In 2008 Tobi Tobsen and Marcnesium made an appearance on the track "Die Insel" on Bo's album "Dumm aber Schlau".

In 2013 Fünf Sterne Deluxe had their comeback on the Beats auf der Bahn Festival. In the following years they toured through many Festivals and the Single "Wer hat die dicksten Eier" was released as a free download. In 2015 the remix album AltNeu was released which contained remixes of their songs. In 2017 they released the Album "Flash".

== Awards ==
In 2000 the band won the award COMET for best Hip Hop National. The award is given by the German music television channel VIVA.

== Discography ==
Title	Format	Month of release	Chart position
"Es ist nicht einfach so allein"	7" single	May 1997	-
"5 Sterne Deluxe"	limited edition 2x12" EP	June 1997	-
"5 Sterne Deluxe"	12"/CD EP	November 1997	-
"Willst du mit mir gehn"	12"/CD EP	February 1998	47
"Dein Herz schlägt schneller"	12"/CD EP	May 1998	62
"Dein Herz schlägt schneller #1"	12"/CD EP	May 1998	-
"Dein Herz schlägt schneller #2 (Remixes)"	12"/CD EP	May 1998	-
Sillium	2xLP/CD album	March 1998	23
Sillium Instrumentals	limited edition 2xLP album	March 1998	-
"Happy HipHop / Discotizer"	limited edition 10" EP	April 1998	-
"Ja ja, Deine Mudder!"	12"/CD EP	November 1999	38
"Die Leude"	12"/Maxi CD EP	July 2000	39
Neo.Now	2xLP/CD album	October 2000	5
Neo.Now Instrumental	limited edition 2xLP album	November 2000	-
"Stop Talkin' Bull #1"	2x12"/CD EP	November 2000	-
"Stop Talkin' Bull #2"	2x12"/CD EP	November 2000	-
Alles muss raus	limited edition CD compilation album	December 2000	-
"Wir sind im Haus"	12"/Maxi CD EP	July 2004	67
"Wer hat die dicksten Eier"	Free Digital download Single	2014	-
AltNeu	Digital download album	January 2015	-
"Moin Bumm Tschack"	Digital download single	July 2017	-
"Afrokalle"	Digital download single	July 2017	-
Flash	2xLP/CD album	October 2017	11

== See also ==
- German hip-hop
- List of German hip-hop musicians
