= 8kids =

German post-hardcore band

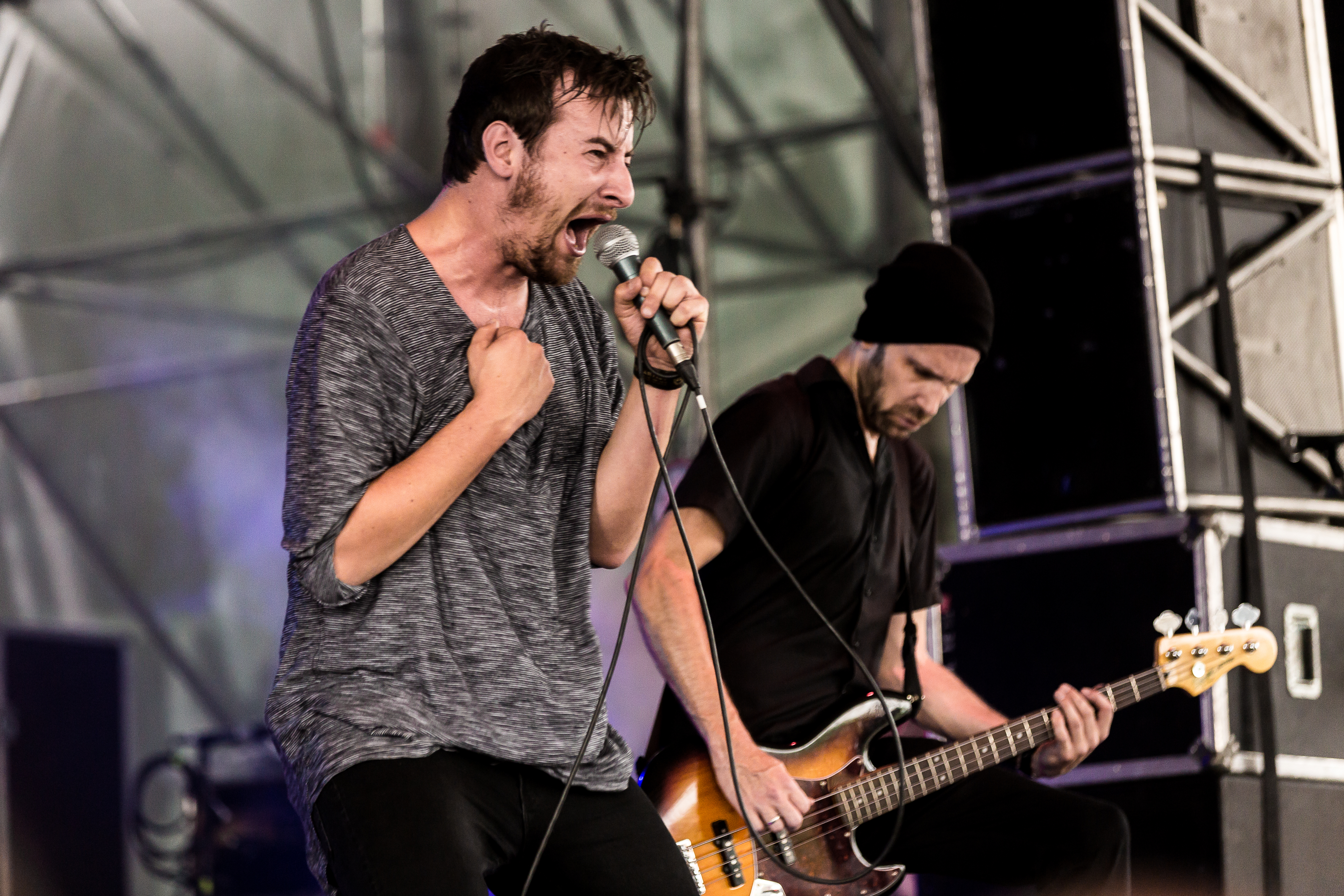
- 8kids performing at With Full Force, 2018

Background information
- Origin: Darmstadt, Hesse; Germany
- Genres: Post-hardcore; Alternative rock Pop
- Years active: 2013–present
- Label: Napalm Records
- Members: Hans Koch; Jonas Jakob; Leif
- Past members: Emma McLellan
- Website: www.8kids.de

8kids is a German post-hardcore band based in Darmstadt, Hesse, formed in 2013.

== History ==
8kids was formed in 2013 by Hans Koch and Jonas Jakob, both being Vocalists and guitarists in the band, who previously played in local underground bands in Darmstadt. A short time later Emma McLellan became the band's drummer.

On 26 March 2016 the band signed a contract with music distributor Melodie der Welt and concert agency Ever Ever Management. The band signed a label contract with Austrian metal label Napalm Records a month before signing to Melodie der Welt. In April the band released their first music video for the song Alles löst sich auf (engl. Everything Dissolves) which premiered at the homepage of German music magazine Visions. 8kids released their debut EP Dämonen (Demons) at the end of the same month. In August 2016 the band performed at Olgas-Rock in Oberhausen, Northrhine-Westfalia.

The band toured alongside To the Rats and Wolves in Germany, Austria, Switzerland and the Czech Republic. Shortly after the release of the debut album Denen die wir waren (Those Who We Were) the band toured Germany again as headliner with support of German metal band Anorak. In September and October of the same year another tour throughout Germany, Austria and Switzerland followed, this time supporting German rock act Van Holzen.

In January and February 2018 the band toured Germany again. 8kids spend the summer performing at several music festivals including With Full Force, Mini-Rock, EselRock and Hurricane Festival.

== Musical style ==
At the beginning of their career the band's lyrics were written in English. When McLellan joined the duo to become the band's drummer, they switched from English lyrics to German. The band's music on the debut EP Dämonen was described as dynamic, containing emotional components and influences from pop music mixed with a blend of screamo. The music was compared to German metalcore act Caliban and some emo bands.

The lyrics were described as profound. The song Zeit (engl. Time) deals with the theme of sorrow. The song is based on a past relationship of band member Hans Koch, with which he struggled with for a long period of time. The band worked on the song for almost two years.

== Discography ==
List of studio albums, with selected chart positions
Year	Album details	Peak chart positions		
Year	Album details	GER	AUT	SWI
2016	Dämonen; Demons: Released: 29 April 2016; Label: Napalm	—	—	—
2017	Denen die wir waren Who We Were: Released: 26 May 2017; Label: Napalm	—	—	—
2019	Blūten; Bleeding: Released: 23 August 2019; Label: Napalm	—	—	—

== Members ==
8kids, live at With Full Force 2018

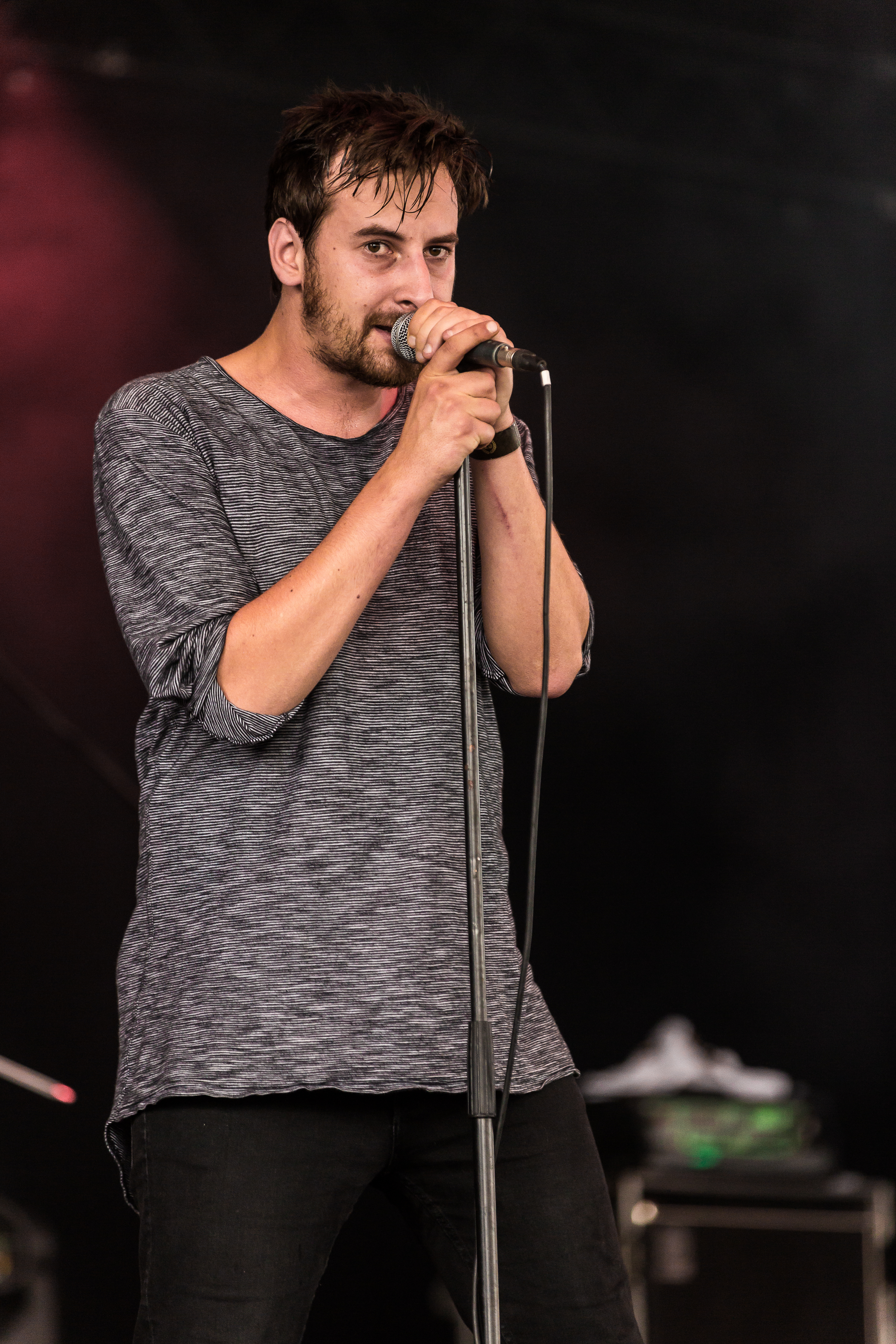
Jonas Jakob (vocals, guitar), 2018

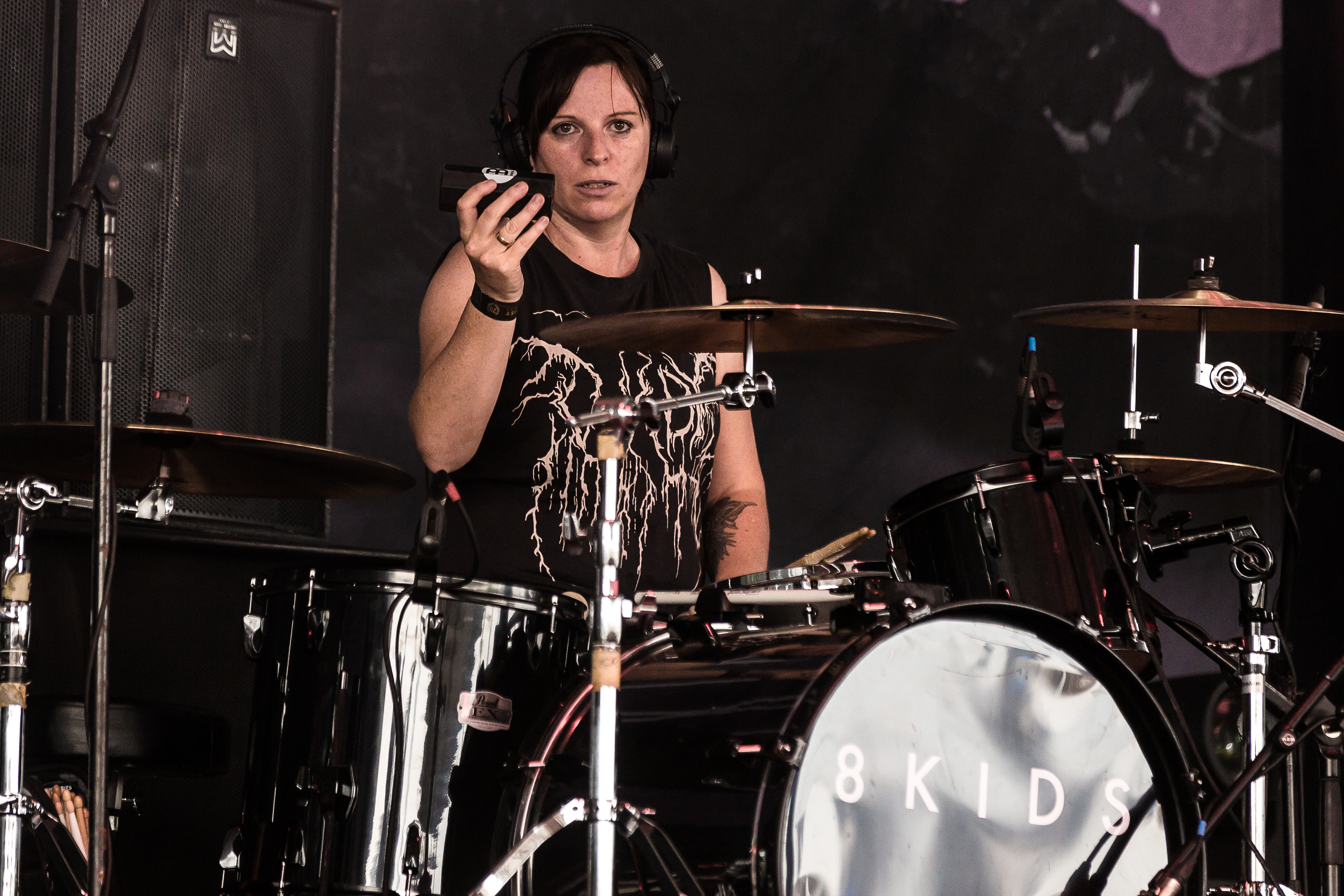
Emma McLellan (drums), 2018

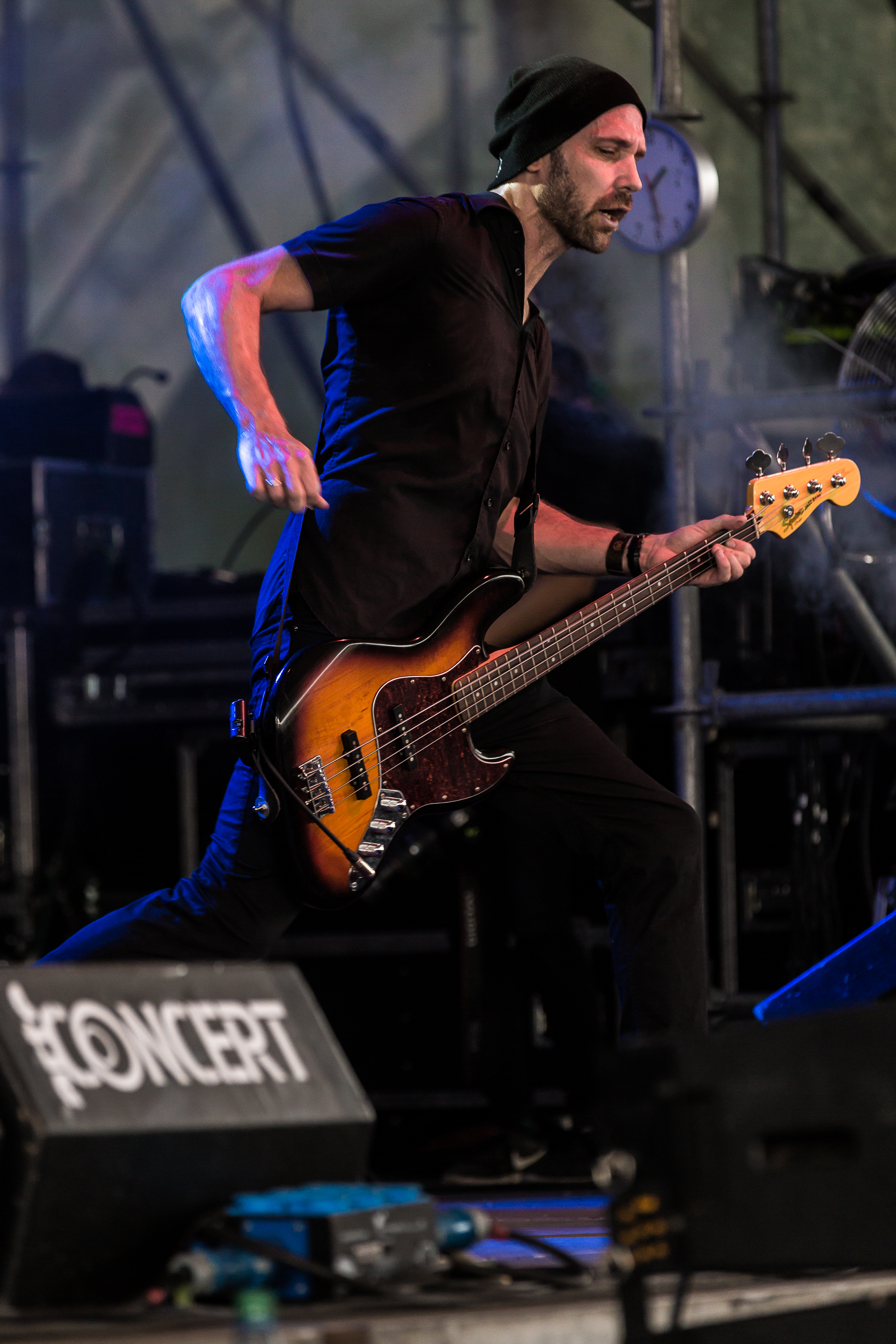
Kristian Kohlmannslehner (live bassist), 2018

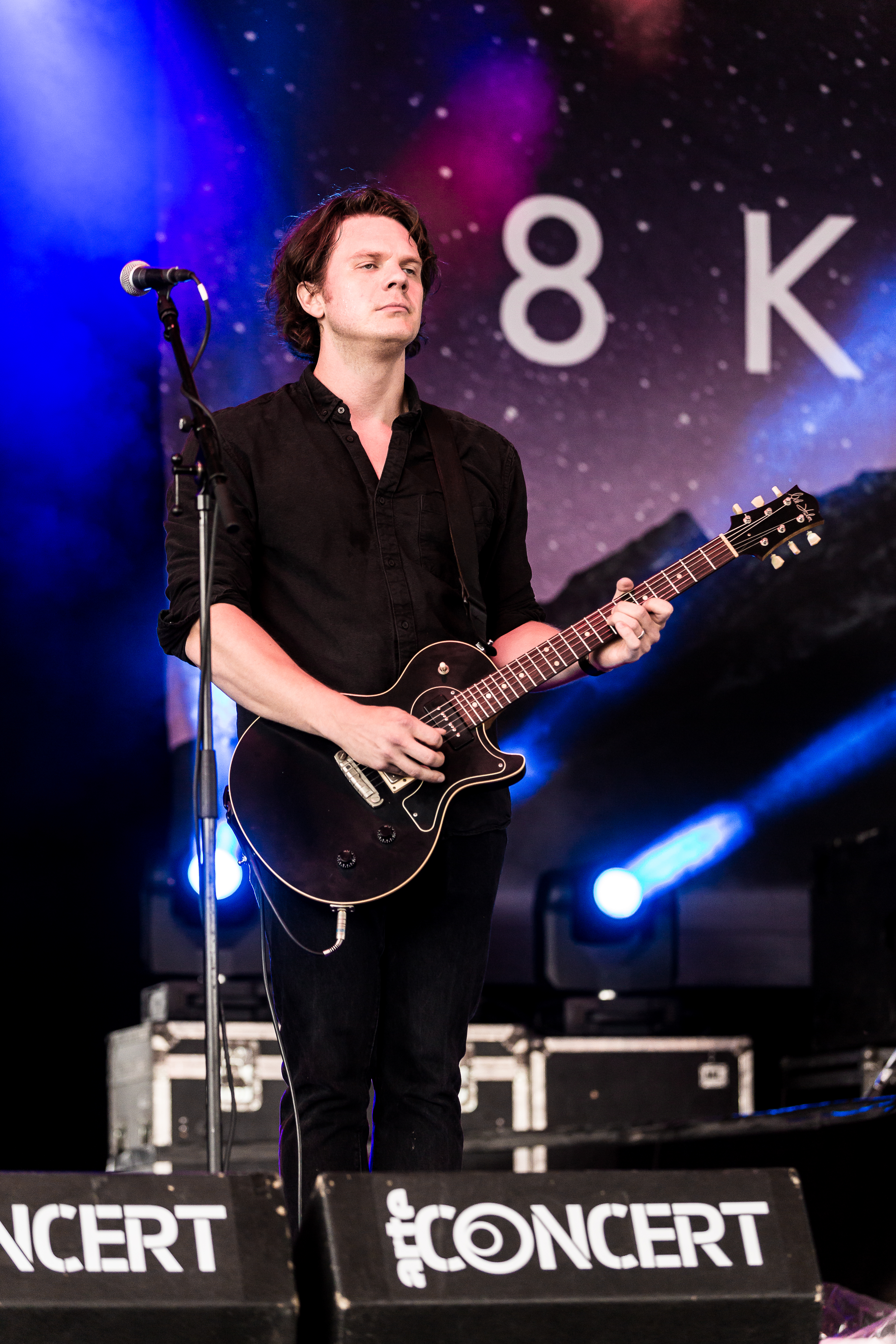
Hans Koch (guitar, vocals), 2018

Current band members

- Hans Koch – vocals, guitar (since 2013)
- Jonas Jakob – vocals, guitar (since 2013)
- Leif - drums (since 2022)

Past band members

- Emma McLellan – drums (2013—2022)
