= Ragazzi =

Ragazzi is an Italian surname. Notable people with the surname include:

- Cesare Ragazzi (1941–2024), Italian entrepreneur, inventor and television personality
- Luca Ragazzi (born 1971), Italian film director, screenwriter, journalist and actor
- Umberto Ragazzi (born 1953), Italian rower

== See also ==
- Ragazzoni
