= Kat Frankie =

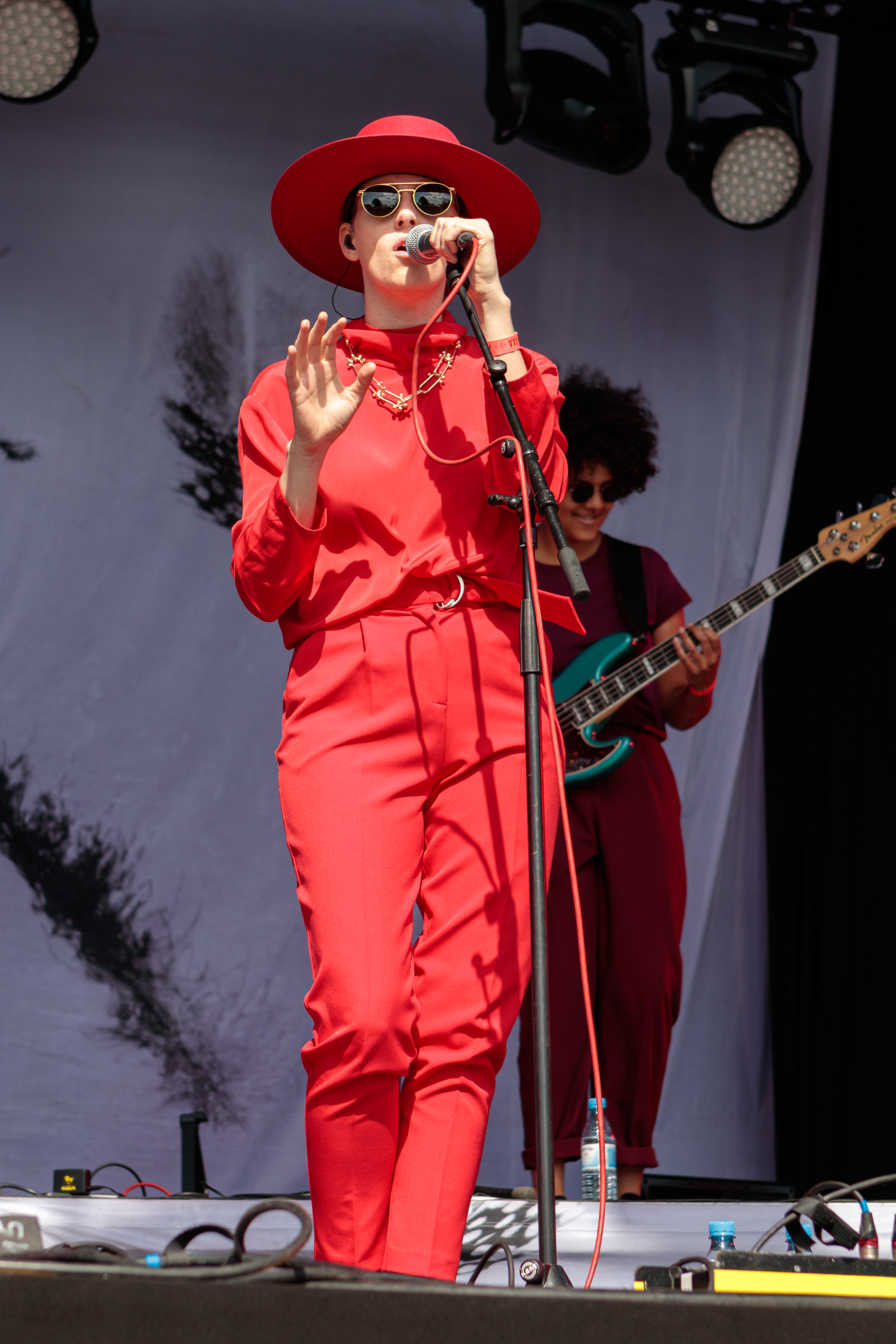
- At Haldern Pop, Rees-Haldern, Germany, August 2019

Background information
- Born: Kathryn Mellander; 8 July 1978 (age 48); Sydney, Australia
- Genres: Folk; pop
- Occupation: Musician
- Instruments: Voice; acoustic guitar; electric guitar
- Years active: 2002–present
- Labels: Independent/MGM; Vitamin; Zellephan; Grönland
- Website: katfrankie.com

Kathryn Mellander (born 8 July 1978), who performs as Kat Frankie is an Australian-born singer-songwriter and guitarist. She relocated to Berlin in December 2004 and has issued four solo studio albums, Pocketknife (September 2007), The Dance of a Stranger Heart (September 2010), Please Don’t Give Me What I Want (September 2012) and Bad Behaviour (January 2018).

== Biography ==
Kat Frankie was born Kathryn Mellander on 8 July 1978 in Sydney, Australia. She grew up with her mother in the Sydney suburbs of Darlinghurst and Surry Hills. Her mother's music collection introduced her to Bread, Carly Simon, and Simon and Garfunkel. She briefly joined a school choir but did not receive formal music lessons but taught herself to sing and from the age of 17 how to play guitar.

Frankie, as Mellander, completed an architectural design course at the College of Fine Arts, University of New South Wales. In August 2001, together with a fellow college student, Mellander co-designed a shop window display for Empire Homeware, in Paddington as part of Sydney Design Week. By 2004 she was working for Dale Jones-Evans, an architect and development firm, where she was part of a team that designed and built the "Art Wall" in Surry Hills.

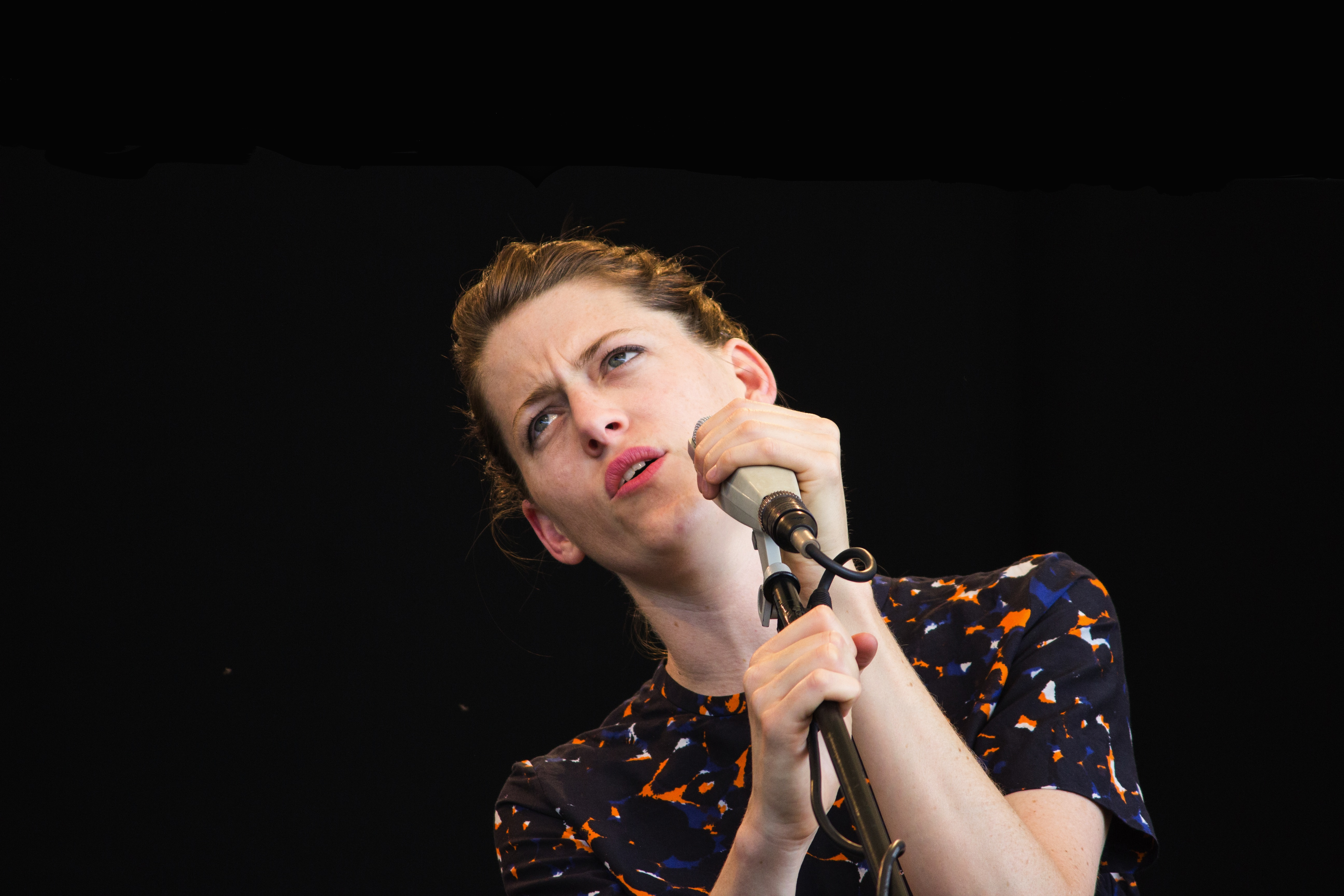
Performing at the Lausch Lounge, Hamburg, July 2013

Frankie cited her early musical influences as PJ Harvey and Fiona Apple. She initially performed as a solo artist, on vocals and acoustic guitar, from June 2002. About a year later she added backing musicians, Tim Chamberlain on bass guitar and Tim Marceau on drums. In December 2003 she independently released her debut five-track extended play, Outside. Now., which was produced by Frankie and engineered by Scott Horscroft at Sydney's BJB Studios and distributed by MGM Distribution. She was still working as an architectural designer and part-time musician. Early in 2004 she entered a new track, "Lucky Star", in the Triple J Unearthed competition.

Frankie relocated to Berlin in December 2004, despite never having visited before and without any German language skills. She had intended to travel for about a year before settling down to work, however she found a welcoming community in Berlin's Kreuzberg as her "new home". The artist recollected choosing Berlin, "I was a big fan of Chicks on Speed. In an interview they said Berlin was the best place in the world to make music, and I believed them." During 2006 she was one of six musicians filmed by Uli M Schueppel for Berlin Song over the course of a year. In the documentary Frankie was asked to take him to her favourite places, perform her tracks and to write a song about Berlin – she provided, "The Faint-hearted Ones". Berlin Song was premiered at the 57th Berlinale in February 2007, which Arte's Nana Rebhan observed, "succeeded in making an atmospheric and poetic film that confirms why it is so good to live in this city."

The singer-songwriter issued her debut studio album, Pocketknife, on 3 September 2007 via Gazelle/Vitamin Records in the Australian market. It was produced by Simon Ayton, who also provided drums. She explained to Carlisle Rogers of 3D Staging how it was recorded at various venues in Berlin, with numerous local artists, over the previous two years. Michael Pincott of Rave Magazine observed, "[it is] far removed from vacuous candy-coated pop ditties", with her ability to "craft dense, rich, dramatic folk songs. It has the air of certainty and confidence." To promote the album in Australia she undertook a solo acoustic tour during September.

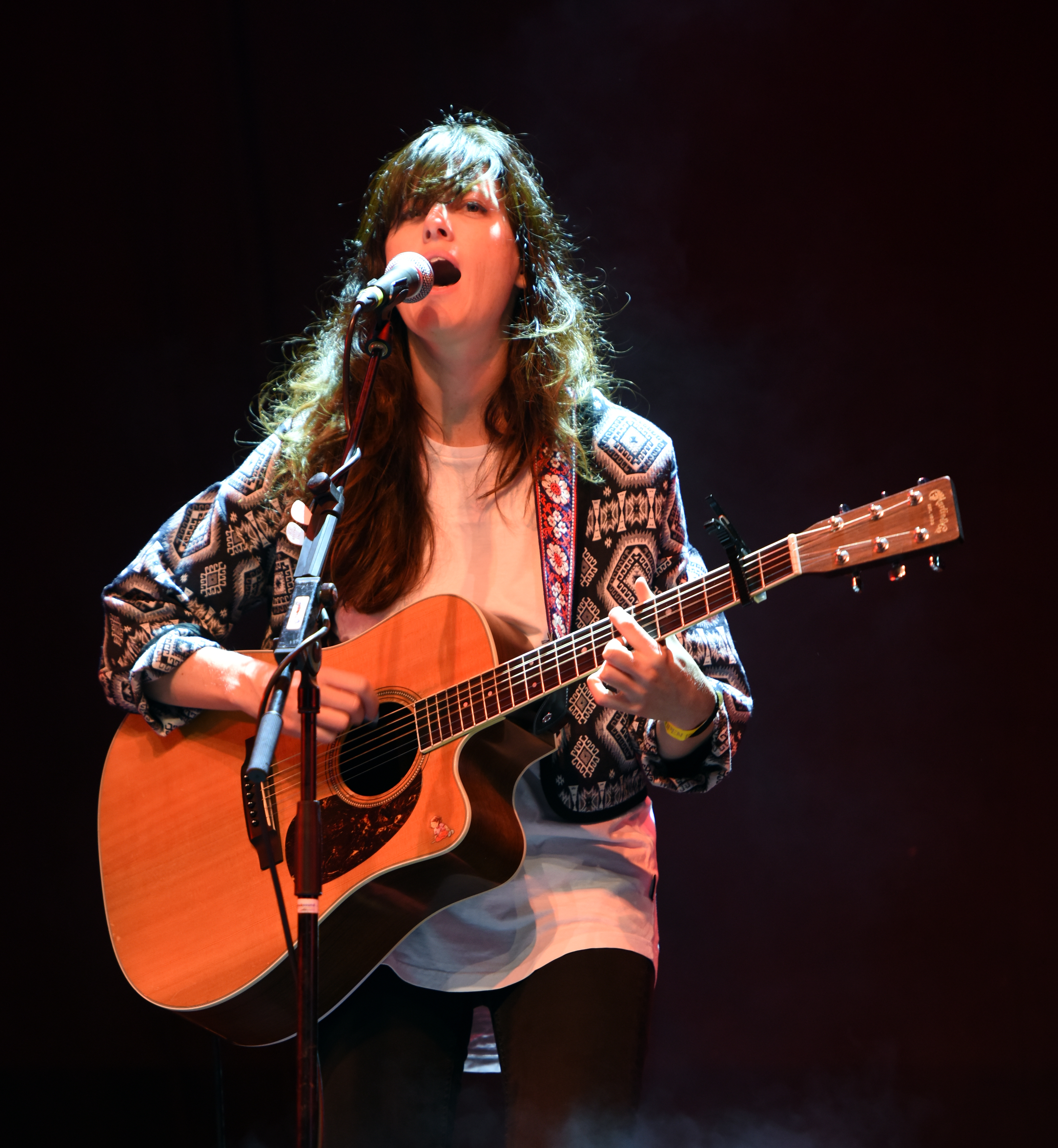
As part of Olli Schulz' backing band, Open Flair, Eschwege, Germany, August 2015

Pocketknife was released in Germany in January 2008 via Solaris Empire. Her European-based touring band included Ben Kaan on guitar, Chris Rodriguez on bass guitar, Steffen Schlosser on drums and Karen Weber on cello. She returned to Australia in April 2008 to play further solo dates. The album's singles were, "The Tops" (February 2007) and "Serves You Right for Using Violence" (August). Back in Berlin, The Dance of a Stranger Heart, Frankie's second album, was issued in September 2010 via Zellephan. She toured the German cities of Cologne, Frankfurt, Berlin and Karlsruhe in support of the album in October and November 2010. Her third album, Please Don't Give Me What I Want, appeared in September 2012. Both albums, "had a cadence informed by singer-songwriter pop, but her music grew ever richer and more diverse. [Her] discovering and beginning to work with a loop station was a big reason for that."

Frankie provided guitar and vocals for German singer-songwriter, actor and presenter, Olli Schulz' third solo album, Feelings aus der Asche (Feelings from the Ashes, 2015) and supported its release by touring in his backing group from March to November in that year. She also collaborated with Get Well Soon's Konstantin Gropper to write, "When You're Near Me", the title theme song for German TV talk show, Schulz und Böhmermann (from 2016) – which pairs Schulz with satirist, Jan Böhmermann. During 2016 she formed a pop duo, Keøma, with fellow singer-songwriter Chris Klopfer, which toured Germany in March. Keøma had entered, "Protected", to qualify for Germany in the Eurovision Song Contest 2016 in February of that year. They released a self-titled album, via Embassy of Sound, with 12 tracks co-written and co-produced by the pair.

She released, Bad Behaviour, her fourth solo album in February 2018 through Grönland Records. It peaked in the top 100 on the German albums chart.

== Discography ==
=== Albums ===
- Pocketknife (3 September 2007) – Gazelle/Vitamin Records (VT0032)
- The Dance of a Stranger Heart (September 2010) – Zellephan (ZLFN001-10)
- Please Don't Give Me What I Want (September 2012) – Zellephan (ZLFN003-12)
- Bad Behaviour (9 February 2018) – Grönland Records (CDGRON 179, LPGRON 179) GER No. 72
- Shiny Things (13 May 2022) – Grönland Records (LPGRON259)

Keøma

- Keøma (2016) – Embassy of Sound (1172402)

=== Extended plays ===
- Outside. Now. (December 2003) – Independent/MGM Distribution (KAT 08809)

=== Singles ===
- "The Tops" (February 2007)
- "Serves You Right for Using Violence" (August 2007)
- "Frauen Verlassen" (October 2011)
- "Bad Behaviour" (September 2017)
- "Home" (December 2017)
- "Du/Ich" (November 2018)
