= Angelika Express =

German pop and punk band

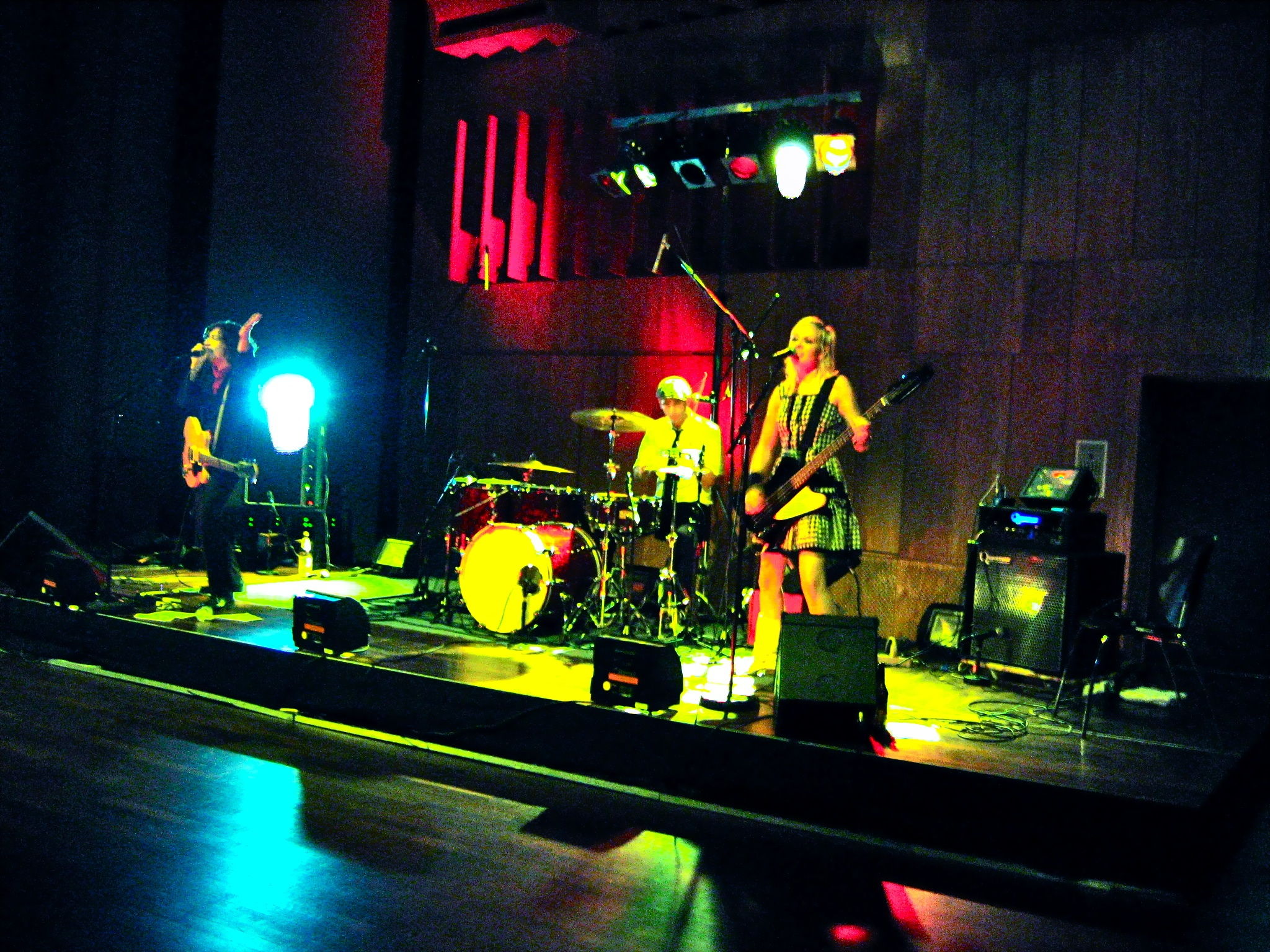
Angelika Express

Angelika Express is a German pop and punk band. The band was formed in 2002 by Robert Drakogiannakis. It broke up in 2005, but reunited in 2008.

== 2002-2005 ==
Formed by guitarist Robert Drakogiannakis, the original trio include Alex Jezdinsky on drums and Jens Bachmann on bass guitar. All three members sang. They signed to Wuppertal Music Label Group and released a debut self-titled album that received some attention on the independent music scene but failed to draw wide attention. In 2003, they released the EP Ich bin kein Amerikaner (eng. "I Am not an American"). 2004 saw the release of a second album, Alltag für Alle ("routine for all"), and another EP, Phantome ("Phantoms"). In 2005, the band released the live album Pornographie. The band had one television appearance on Newcomer TV in 2005 before separating, with the members joining other projects.

== 2008 ==
In 2008, Drakogiannakis resumed the band as a solo project, providing all instrumentation, with support live on bass from Dani "das Bassmädchen" Hilterhaus (eng. "the bass girl"). Initially, live drum support was offered by Martell Beigang, but after Beigang's departure drum support has been supplied by Mirco "Caddy" Cardeneo and Valentin Mayr. Drakogiannakis released new songs through the Angelika Express blog until late August 2008 and then began financing the planned album Goldener Trash by pre-selling shares to fans, a marketing idea that drew attention from the Heute show on ZDF. In 2009, an EP entitled Was wollt ihr alle? ("What do you all want?") was published, with an internet video supporting it. At the end of 2009, Hosen runter! Die Angelika Demos 2002–2005 ("Pants Down! The Angelika Demos 2002-2005") was released as a free album on the internet.

== Discography ==
=== Albums ===
- Angelika Express (LP / CD, March 10, 2003)
- Alltag für Alle (LP / CD, March 29, 2004) ("Everyday life for all")
- Pornographie: Eine Nacht mit Angelika Express im Gleis 22 (CD live album, April 4, 2005) ("Pornography: A night with Angelika Express at Gleis 22")
- Goldener Trash (rough version for download on the homepage, 29 August 2008) ("Golden Trash")
- Goldener Trash (13 February 2009)
- Die dunkle Seite der Macht (November 26, 2010, as a special limited edition with bonus CD, posters and T-Shirt) ("The dark side of the force")
- Die dunkle Seite der Macht (zweiter Teil) (download only, 1 January 2011) ("The dark side of the force (part two)")
- Die feine englische Art (July 12, 2012) ("The proper english form")
- Tantenmaschine (2014) ("Auntmaschine")
- Grösste Treffer II (2016) ("Biggest hits II")
- Alkohol (2016) ("Alcohol")
- Letzte Kraft Voraus (2017) ("Last Steam Ahead")
- Positiver Stress (2021) ("Positive Stress")

=== EPs ===
- Ich bin kein Amerikaner (10 "/ CD, 24 November 2003) ("I am not an american")
- Phantome (CD, November 15, 2004) ("Phantoms")
- Was wollt ihr alle? (CD, November 28, 2008) ("What do you all want?")
- Hände hoch (CD limited to 100 copies with 10 bonus tracks / Download, 20 July 2010) ("Hands up")
- Besoffen im Park (2014) ("Drunk in the park")

=== Singles ===
- Geh doch nach Berlin (Maxi-CD, 2003) ("Just move to Berlin")
- Eigentlich, eigentlich (Maxi-CD, 2003) ("Actually, actually")
- Nimm mich mit (7"-Single/Maxi-CD, 2004) ("Take me with you")
- Rock Fucker Rock (CD, 2004)
- Was wollt ihr alle (2008) ("What do you all want?")
- Dich gibt's nicht (2009) ("You are not available")
- CDU und du / Christin (Double single) (2011) ("CDU and you / Christin")
- 20 Jahre Intro – Damals Teil 8: Retro (7"-Single as a Picture-Disc, limited to 100 copies, September 2011) ("20 years of Intro - Back then part 8: Retro")
- Rekordversuch (Download-Single; 2012) ("Record attempt")
- Matt Damon (2013)
- Hangover Annelore (2015)
- Du bist kaputt (2015) ("You are broken")
- Für Dich (2016) ("For you")
- Kurze oder Longdrinks (2016) ("Short or longdrinks")
- Hartes Glück 2022 (Single 2022) ("Tough Luck")
