= PeterLicht =

German electro-pop musician

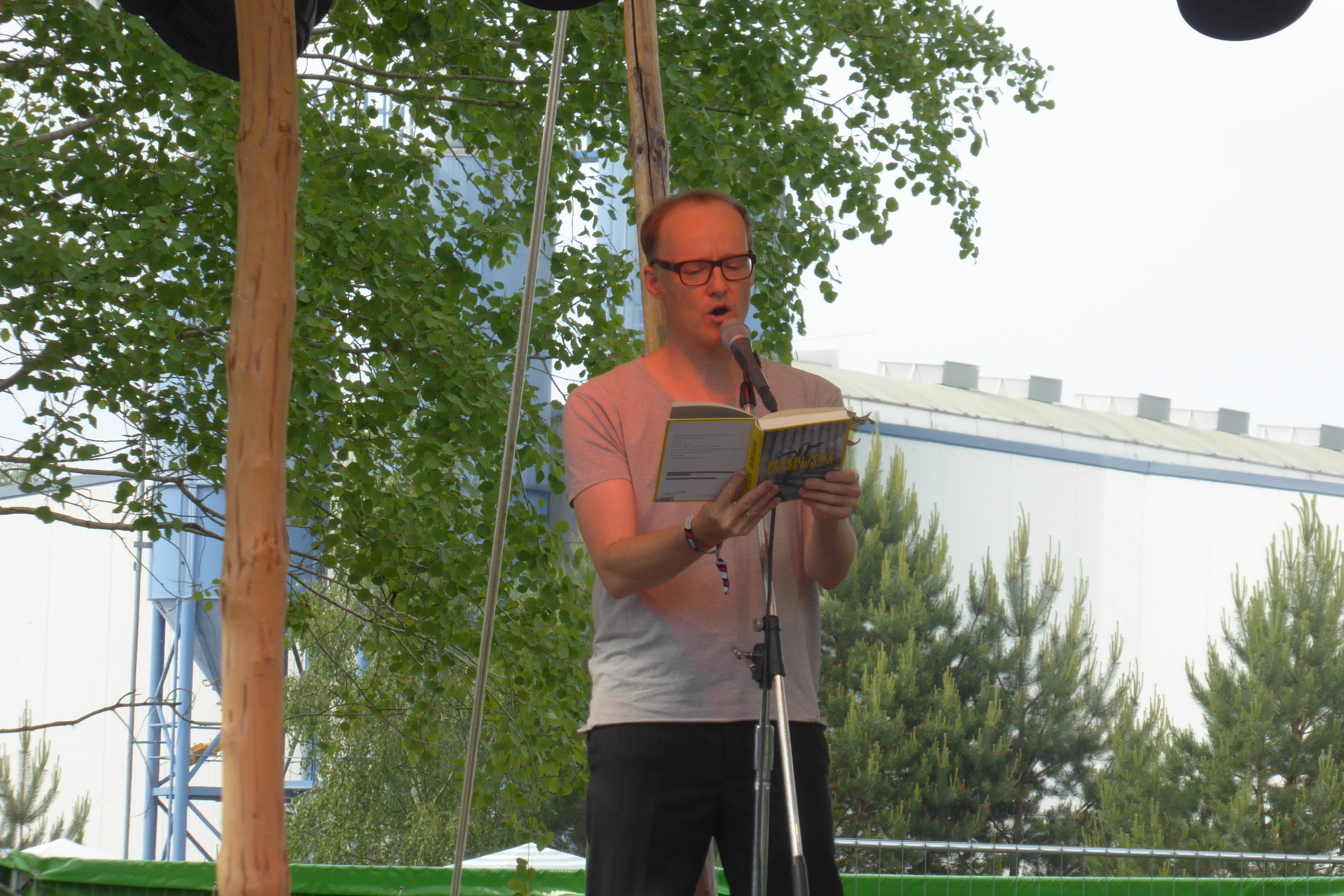

PeterLicht is a German electropop musician and author from Cologne signed with the record label Motor Music, best known for his 2001 single "Sonnendeck".

== Discography ==
All English translations are unofficial.

=== Albums and EPs ===
- 6 Lieder (2000, Betrug) - (6 Songs)
- 14 Lieder (2001, BMG Modul) - (14 Songs)
- Die Transsylvanische Verwandte ist da // Heiterkeit (2001 BMG Modul) Music and Film - (The Transsylvanian Relative is Here / Cheerfulness)
- Stratosphärenlieder (2003, BMG Modul) - (Stratosphere Songs)
- Lieder vom Ende des Kapitalismus (2006, Motor Music) - (Songs from the End of Capitalism)
- Melancholie und Gesellschaft (2008, Motor Music) - (Melancholy and Society)
- Das Ende der Beschwerde (October 28, 2011, Motor Music) - (The End of the Complaint)
- Lob der Realität (October 3, 2014, Staatsakt) - (Praise of Reality)
- Wenn wir alle anders sind (October 19, 2018, Tapete Records) - (When We Are All Different)

=== Singles ===
- Sonnendeck (2001, BMG Modul) - (Sun Deck)
- Heiterkeit (2002, BMG Modul) - (Cheerfulness)
- Safarinachmittag (2003, BMG Modul) - (Safari Afternoon)
- Die Geschichte vom Sommer (2003, BMG Modul) - (The Story of Summer)
- Wettentspannen (2006, Motor Music) - (Relaxation Contest)
- Das absolute Glück (2006, Motor Music) - (Absolute Happiness)

=== 12" Vinyl ===
- Sonnendeck – Remixe (2003, Mofa Schallplatten/Neuton) - (Sun Deck)
- Heiterkeit – Remixe (2002, Mofa Schallplatten/Neuton) - (Cheerfulness)
- Die transsylvanische Verwandte ist da – Remixe (2002, Mofa Schallplatten/Neuton) - (The Transsylvanian Relative is Here)
- Safarinachmittag (2003, BMG Modul) - (Safari Afternoon)
- Die Geschichte vom Sommer (2003, BMG Modul) - (The History of Summer)
- Antilopen (2003, BMG Modul) - (Antelopes)
- Das absolute Glück - Remixe (2006, Motor Music) - (Absolute Happiness)
