= Friska Viljor (band) =

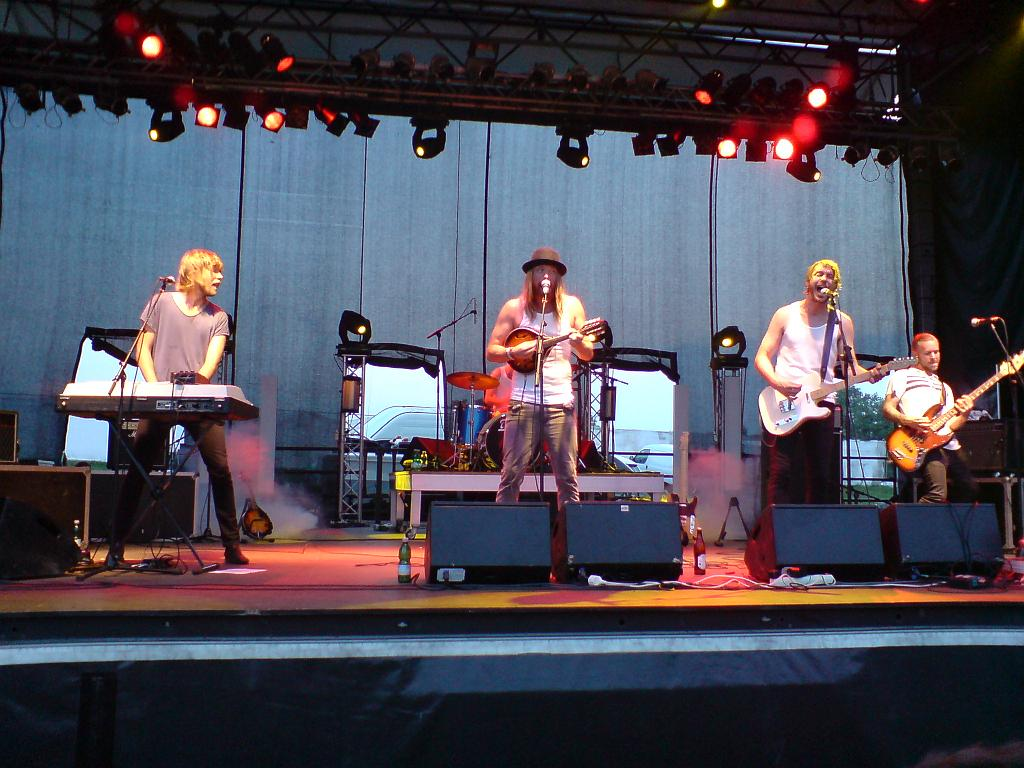
- Friska Viljor performing live

Background information
- Origin: Stockholm, Sweden
- Genres: Indie rock, folk pop
- Label: Crying Bob Records
- Website: https://friskaviljor.net

Friska Viljor are a Swedish indie rock band from Stockholm. Daniel Johansson and Joakim Sveningsson founded the band in January 2005. The men of Friska Viljor have pledged to never compose sober.

Their debut album Bravo! was released in Sweden in 2006 then the rest of the world the following year. Tour de Hearts was released to the world on 21 May 2008. The band has toured internationally, performing at the Rock am Bach Festival in Neuhofen an der Ybbs, Austria in 2007. With their 2013 album "Remember Our Name", Friska Viljor went touring Europe and played sold-out shows especially in Germany. In 2013 they will play some big German summer festivals as Hurricane Festival, and another leg of European club touring in autumn.

== Biography ==
According to their website (friskaviljor.net):

"It was January, in the year of grace 2005. Two broken relationships had led two very good friends down the path to the strikingly untidy rehearsal studio. A decision was made. A decision that may well change these lost souls lives forever. A decision that was based on the numerous nights of toxic discussions between the two. The one topic that was always brought to life these nights, ever so confusing, was love.

It haunted them so badly that they´d now decided to put it aside. At least the love dedicated to your lover. All the energy given and received would now be focused elsewhere. At what you may think? Music? No, not music, but life, joy, playfulness and the freedom to do whatever you want.

So now, there you are, maybe with a little circular plastic piece lying in front of you. Or maybe you have just recently heard of this band and you are now looking at their story on a shiny screen. Anyhow you may not believe it, but that little plastic piece combined with a stereo, or clicking on a sound link on this screen, volume cranked up of course, brings all that life, joy, playfulness and freedom to You, with all the energy that once was dedicated to a now lost love."

== Discography ==
=== Albums ===
- 2006: Bravo!
- 2008: Tour de Hearts
- 2009: For New Beginnings
- 2011: The Beginning of the Beginning of the End
- 2013: Remember Our Name
- 2015: My name is Friska Viljor
- 2019: Broken
- 2022: Don't Save the Last Dance

=== Singles ===
- 2006: Gold
- 2007: Oh Oh
- 2008: Shotgun Sister
- 2008: Old Man
- 2009: Wohlwill
- 2011: Larionov
- 2013: Stalker
