= I Heart Sharks =

Indie electronica band from Berlin

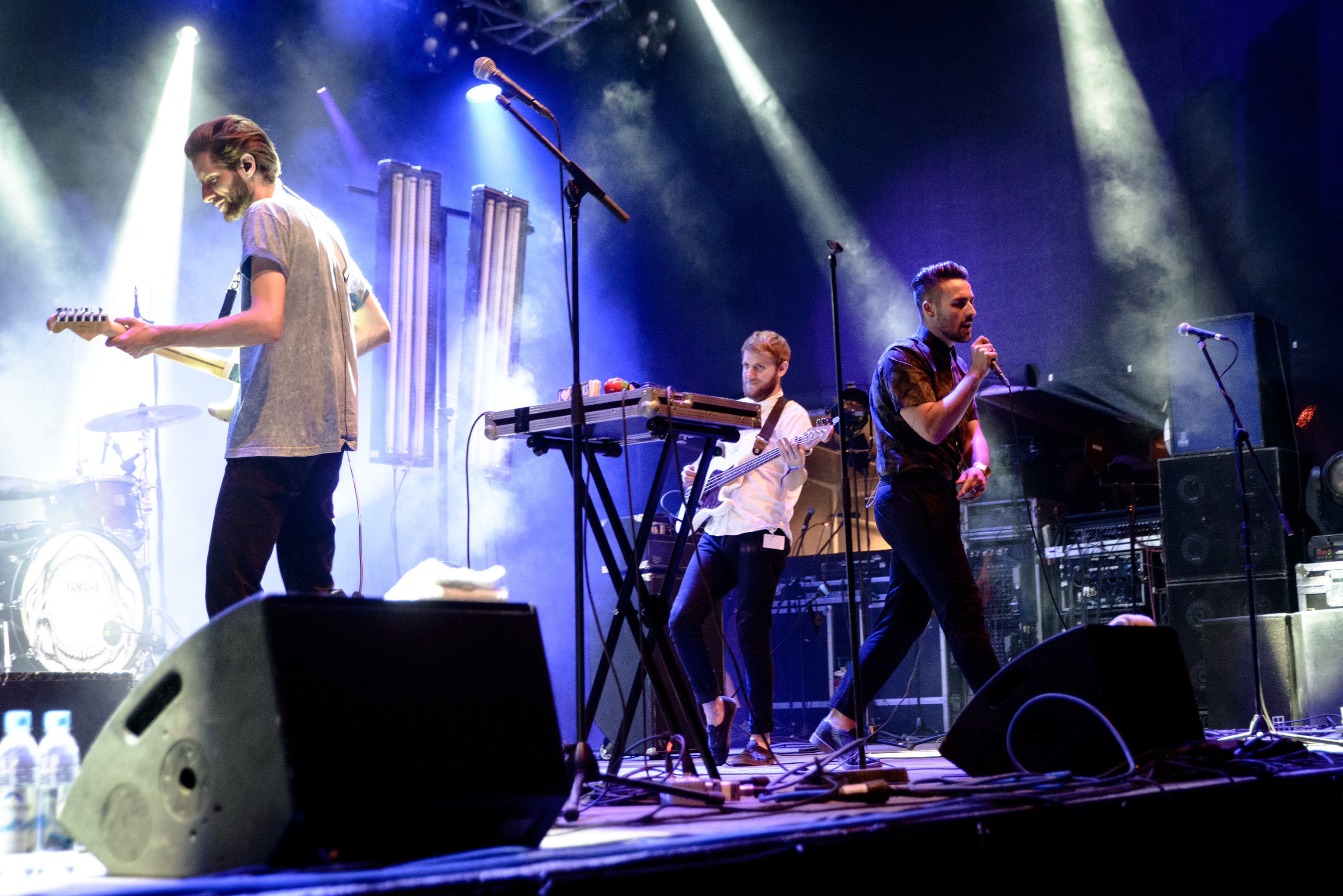

Background information
- Origin: Berlin, Germany
- Genres: Indietronica
- Years active: 2008–2018
- Labels: Island Records Berlin, AdP Records
- Members: Pierre Bee; Simon Wangemann; Martin Wolf; Craig Miller
- Past members: Georg Steinmaier
- Website: www.iheartsharks.net

I Heart Sharks were a German–British Indietronica band from Berlin, Germany. They have released on Island Records and AdP Records respectively.

== History ==
Founded in 2008 after Pierre Bee moved to Berlin from London, I Heart Sharks have supported acts such as Cobra Starship, BLK JKS, Does It Offend You, Yeah? and Zoot Woman. In 2011 they went on tour in Germany with Friendly Fires and Natalia Kills.

The band cite a mixture of both German and British influences, including Kraftwerk and The Cure, and are celebrated for spearheading a new indie music scene in Berlin and Germany.

The band's first single, "Wolves", was released on Laserlaser/Rough Trade in July 2010 and included several remixes, including one from Cobra Starship guitarist Ryland Blackinton.

The second single, Neuzeit, was released digitally and as a handmade physical special edition limited to 300 copies on AdP Records/Alive on 21 October 2011. The song was the band's first venture into German lyrics, albeit only in the chorus, and the video features topless dancers with images of the band members projected upon them. On 28 October 2011, I Heart Sharks released their debut album, Summer, also on AdP Records/Alive. It was met with positive reviews from the German music press, many comparing the band to contemporaries Foals and Friendly Fires through their live show, but also mentioning that some of the live energy is lost on the LP.

On 13 December 2011, the band released a statement on their Tumblr blog that drummer Georg Steinmaier was leaving the band. After a brief period with a session drummer, I Heart Sharks started 2012 with new permanent member Martin Wolf.

Guitarist Simon Wangemann has also worked as a producer, remixer or engineer for other bands such as 'Ja, Panik', 'Bilderbuch', 'Dadajugend Polyform' and 'Lux Repeat'.

The song "Neuzeit" was chosen as the Berlin Festival Anthem in 2012.

== "Anthems" ==
In 2013 I Heart Sharks signed a record deal with Island Records and finished producing their follow-up album "Anthems". The album was recorded in an unused textile mill in Manchester and in the former DDR radio station in Köpenick in Berlin with the help of producer Joe Cross of Hurts and The Courteeners fame. Other notable contributors include Midge Ure and Henning Sommer from Hamburg band Wilhelm Tell Me.

"Anthems" was released in Germany, Austria and Switzerland on 28 March 2014, and received a very positive responses from the press. The sound was described as poppier than the predecessor, "Summer", with more confident vocals and thicker arrangements, some even going so far as to describe the band as "Berlin's Hipster Prophets".

== "Hey Kid" ==
After a year-long break, I Heart Sharks released the "Hey Kid" EP on 28 March 2016. The EP featured 3 original tracks: "Hey Kid", "Dancing On Your Own" and "Back Home", as well as a Favourite Child remix of the title track.

The video to "Dancing On Your Own" mocked the taboo around female masturbation, using fruit and food to simulate sexual situations.

== Members ==
I Heart Sharks, Live @ Utopia Island Festival 2015

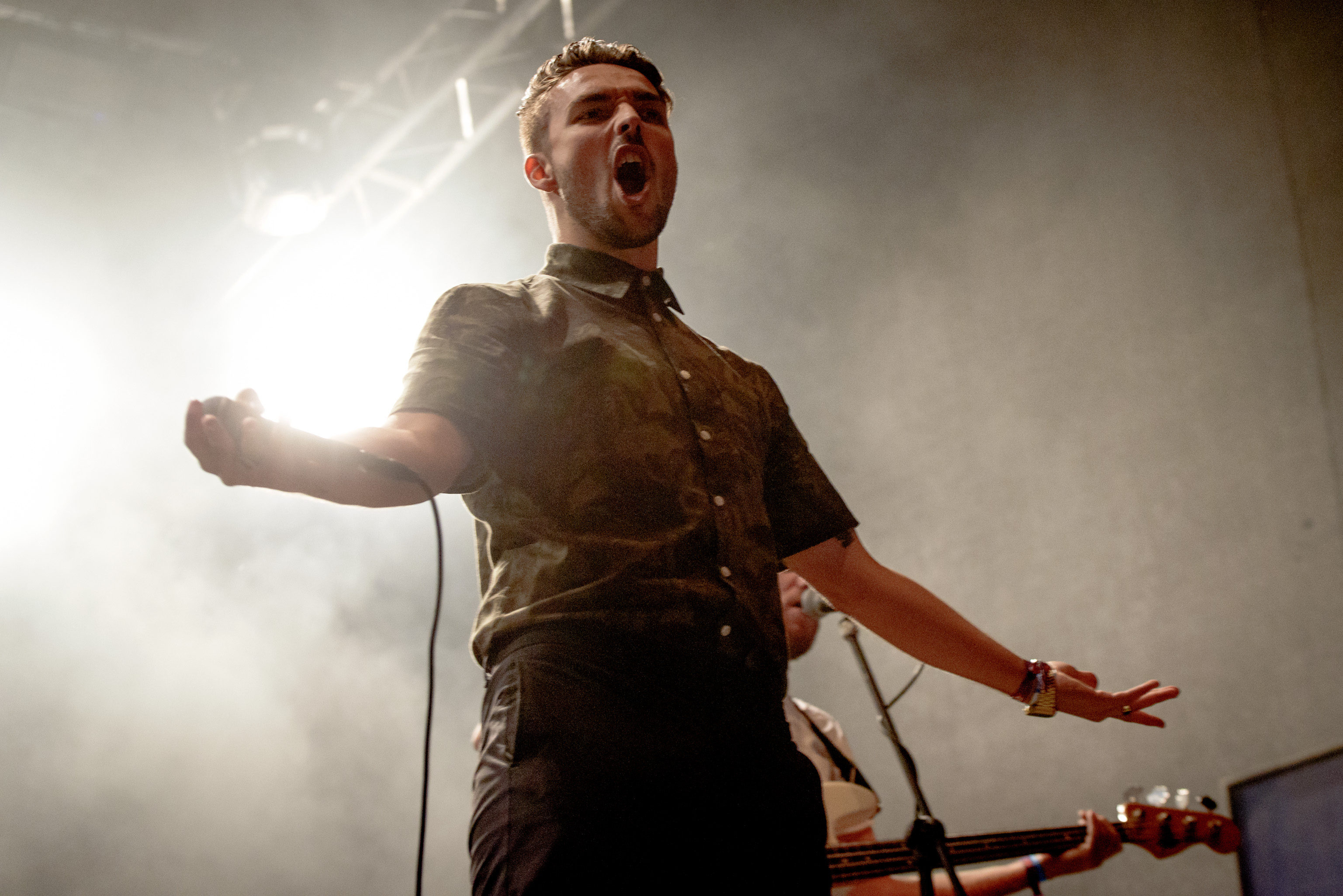
Pierre Bee

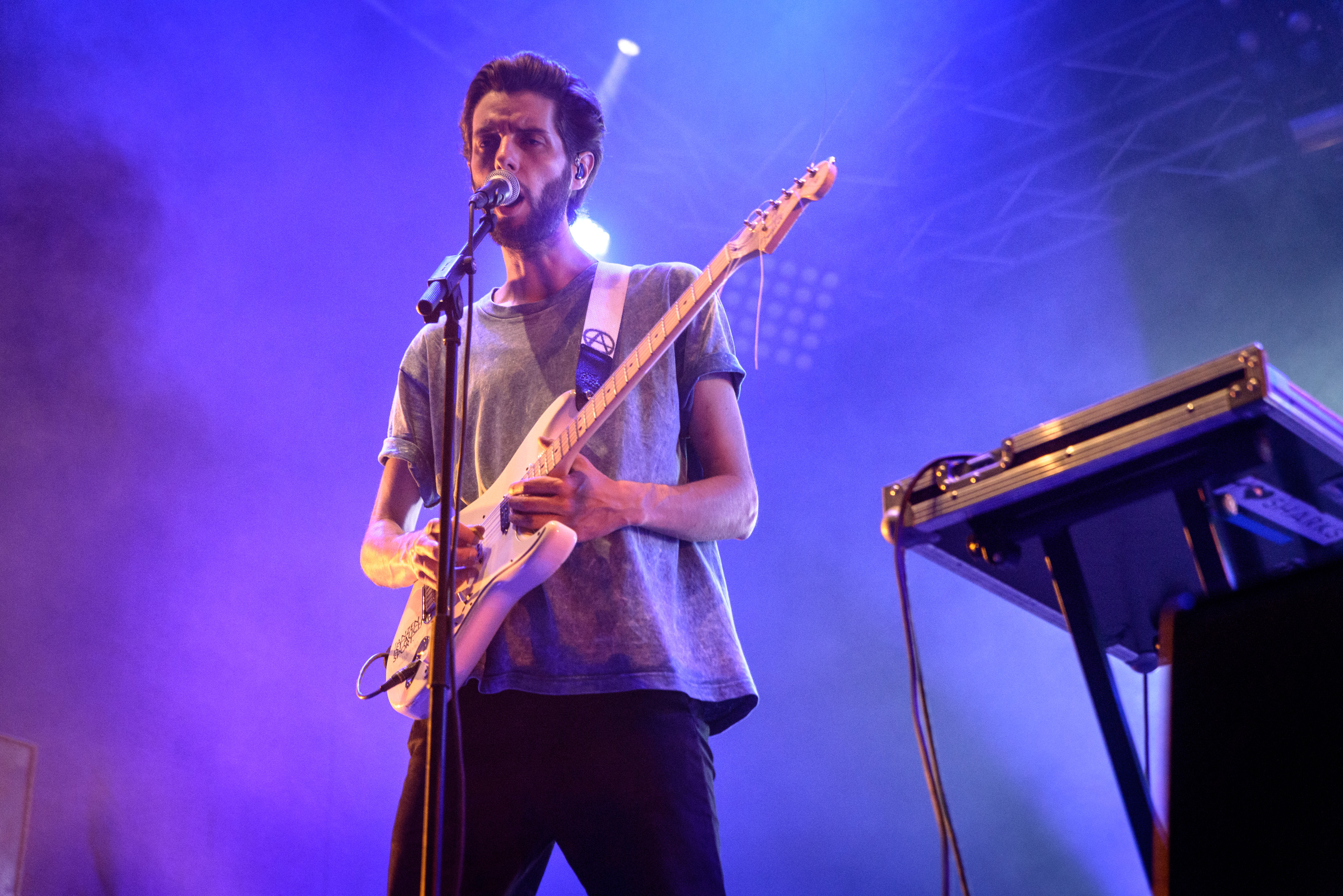
Simon Wangemann

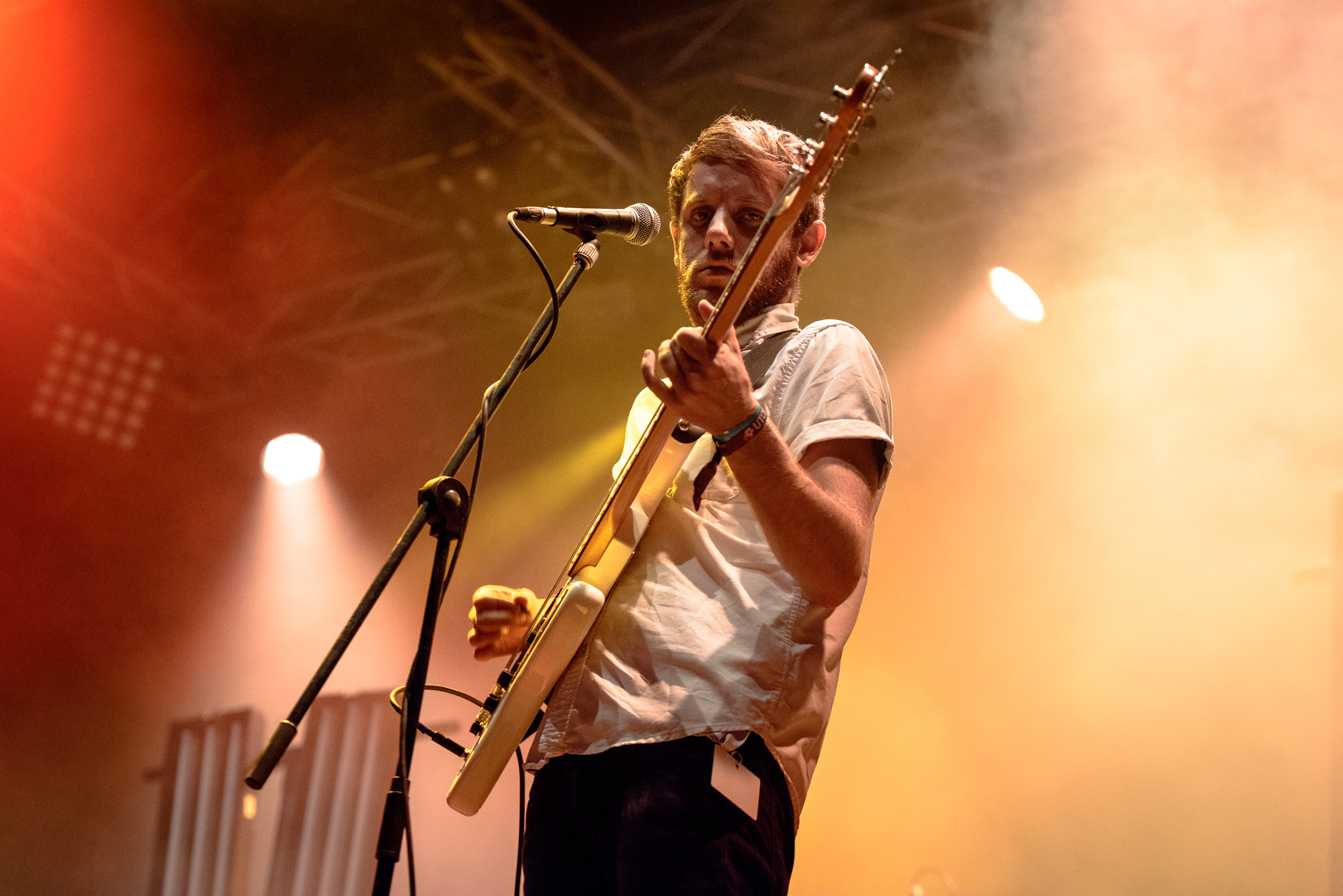

Pierre Bee – Synthesizer, Vocals.

Simon Wangemann – Guitar, Synthesizer, Vocals.

Martin Wolf – Drums, Synthesizer.

Craig Miller – Bass guitar, Vocals.

== Discography ==
=== Albums ===
- 2016 – Hideaway
- 2014 – Anthems
- 2011 – Summer

=== Singles/EPs ===
- 2016 – Hey Kid EP
- 2014 – To Be Young
- 2011 – Neuzeit
- 2010 – Wolves EP
