= Bonaparte (band) =

BONAPARTE
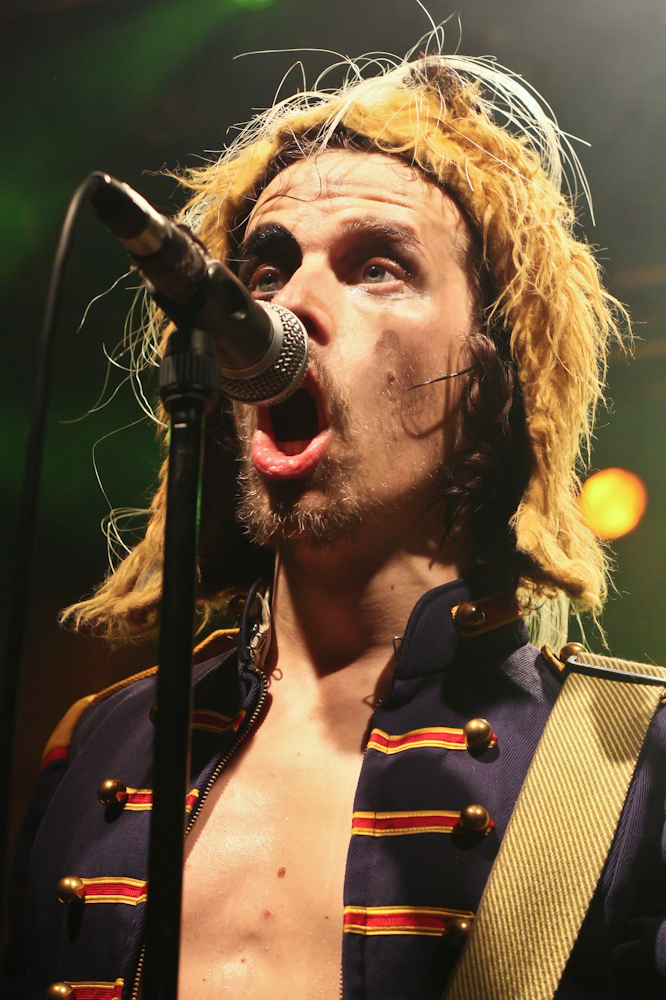
- Tobias Jundt

Background information
- Origin: Berlin, Germany
- Genres: Dance-punk, electronic rock, indie rock
- Years active: since 2006
- Label: Independent
- Website: www.bonaparte.cc

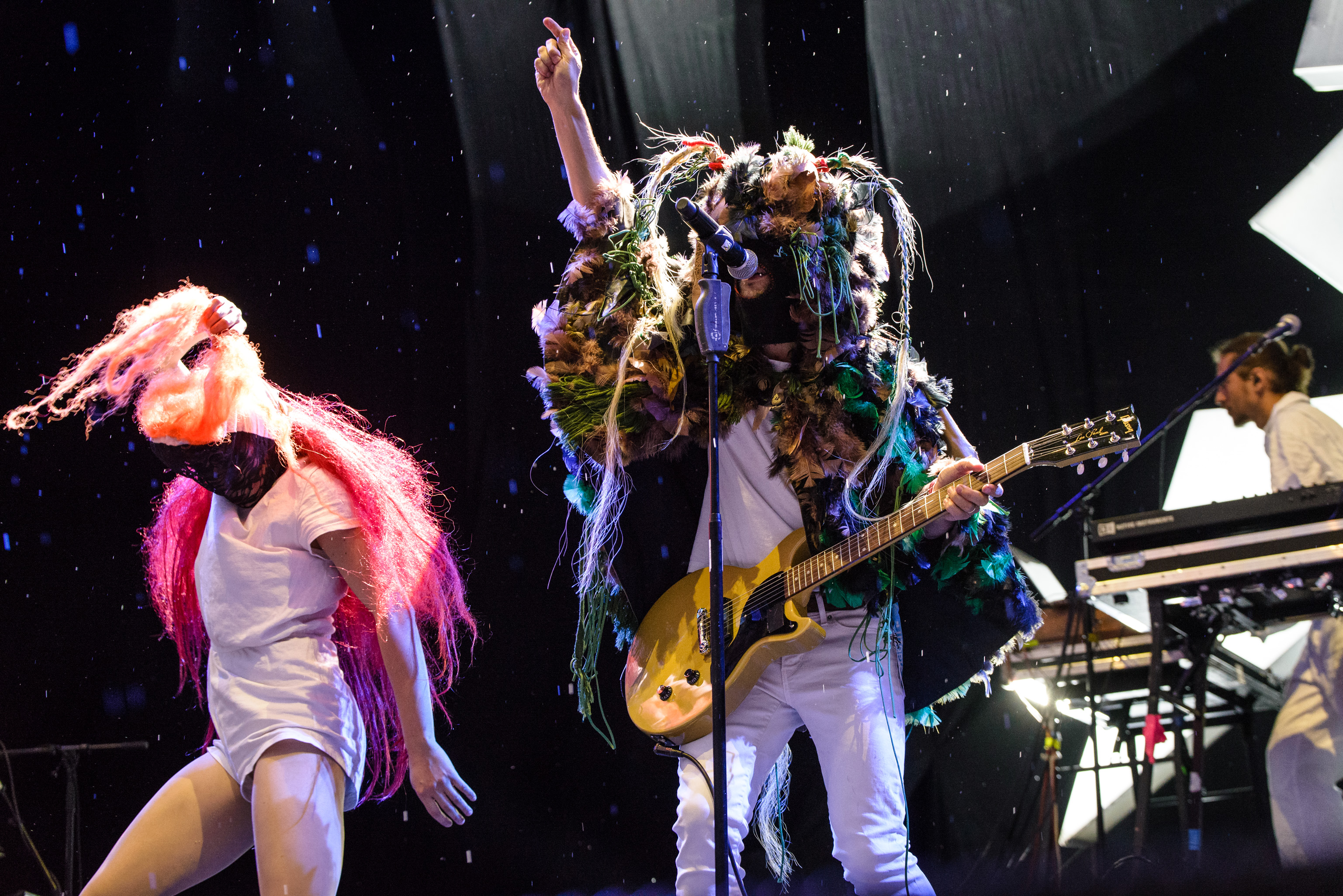
Bonaparte 2016 (5 von 10)

Bonaparte is the stage name of Berlin-based Swiss independent songwriter and producer Tobias Jundt. Jundt is the only permanent member in the studio, collaborating with a changing cast of live musicians and performers when touring. Since 2006 Bonaparte has performed over 700 shows worldwide, playing in such places as Europe, China, Russia, New Zealand and the United States of America.

The band is characterised by their expressive critically acclaimed live performances. German newspaper Der Tagesspiegel describes the band as "A multi-ethnic group ruled by the party-Kaiser; a trash circus unleashed".

== Style ==
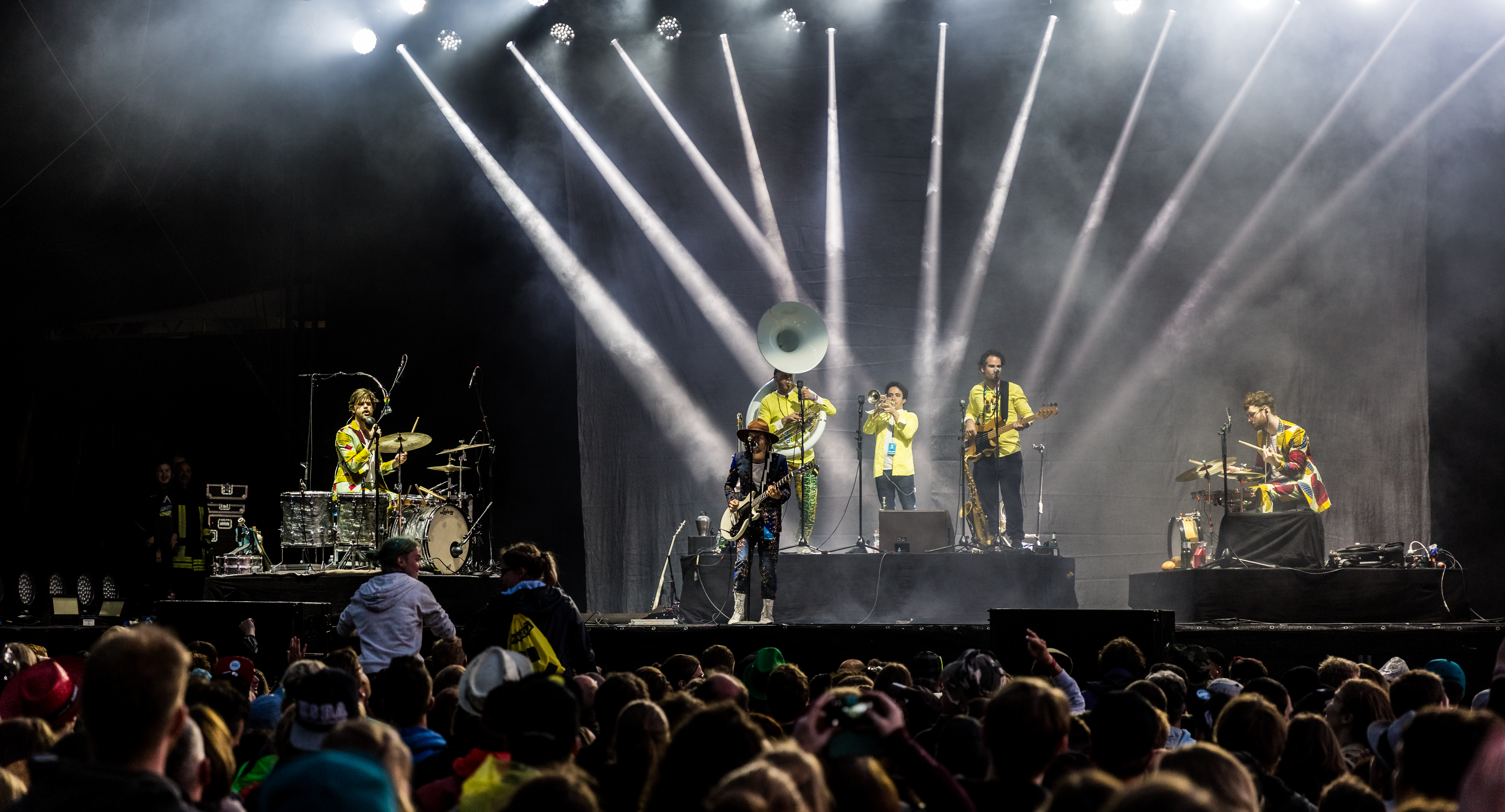
Bonaparte live at Rock am Ring 2017

Bonaparte is known for its socio-critical lyrics as well as its celebration of hedonism. The Berliner Zeitung described Bonaparte as "analoge Bohème,".

== Media awards ==
- "Radio Award Für Neue Musik" from Popkomm, Germany, 2008
- "Style Award Domestic" from Musikexpress, Germany, 2009
- "Too Much" No. 1 Biggest Hit in 2009 from 78s Magazine, Switzerland, 2009
- "Best Art Project" from 16 Tons Awards, Moscow, Russia, 2009
- Schweizer Musikpreis, Nomination, 2016

== Band members ==
- Tobias Jundt is the only permanent member of the group.

== Discography ==
=== Studio albums ===
- Too Much (2008)
- My Horse Likes You (2010)
- Sorry, We're Open (2012)
- Bonaparte (2014)
- The Return of Stravinsky Wellington (2017)
- Was Mir Passiert (2019)

=== Other albums ===
- Remuched (2009) (Double CD with remixes and live material)
- Rave Rave Remix (2011) (Remix album)
- 0110111 - Quantum Physics & A Horseshoe (2011) (Live DVD and soundtrack)
- OST Beck's Letzter Sommer (album) (2015)

=== Singles ===
- "Too Much" (2008) (CD)
- "Computer in Love" (2010) (10' Vinyl with Remixes by Modeselektor, Siriusmo, Jason Forrest)
- "Fly a Plane Into Me" (2010) (7' Vinyl. b-side: Things Are More Like They Are Now)
- "Louie, Louie" (2012) (free digital download only)
- "Quarantine" (2012) (12' vinyl with Remixes by a.o. Housemeister)
- "Mañana Forever" (2013) (digital only)
- Into The Wild (2015) (digital only)
- White Noize (2016) (digital only)
- Melody X (2017) (digital only)
- Château Lafite (2019)
- Weinbar (Live in Abidjan)(2020)
- Last Two Lovers / Untitled #2 (2021)
- Keine Zukunft (I - III)(2022)
- Mushroom Hat / Untitled #3 (2023)
- People vs. Money / Fuck Money (2024)

=== Remixes ===
- 2007: Die Piratenbraut – "12345und20" (Der Kleine Remix by Bonaparte)
- 2007: Mother's Ruin – "Godzilla vs. Bonaparte"
- 2009: Kissogram – "The Deserter" (Bonaparte Remix)
- 2011: Housemeister – "Music Is Awesome" (Bonaparte Remake Radio Edit & Extended Version)
- 2011: The Monsters – "I Want You" (Bonaparte Remix)
- 2012: MIA. – "Fallschirm" (Bonaparte Remix)
- 2012: Die Ärzte – "Ist das noch Punkrock?" (Bonaparte Remix)
- 2013: Dagobert – "Ich bin zu jung" (Bonaparte Remix)
- 2016: Da Cruz - Cala A Boca (Bonaparte Remix)

=== Collaborations ===
- 2016: Mule & Man (Bonaparte & Kid Simius): One Hand Clap EP
- 2020: Bonaparte & Acid Pauli: Good Morning / Not Today (2 track)
- 2021: Bonaparte & Sophie Hunger: 1 / Daft Punk spielen in meinem Haus (EP)
- 2022: Bonaparte & Kid Simius: Good Things (EP)
- 2024: Bonaparte & Wolf Biermann

=== Soundtracks as Studio Bonaparte ===
- 2019: Jerks, Season 3 (Joyn) (Soundtrack)
- 2020: Der Göttliche Andere / Divine (Warner Bros) (Soundtrack)
- 2021: Jerks, Season 4 (Joyn) (Soundtrack)
- 2023: Jerks, Season 5 (John) (Soundtrack)
- 2024: Viktor Bringt's (Amazon) (Soundtrack)
- 2024: The Wagner Brothers - Original Soundtrack (ZDF) (Studio Bonaparte, Bonaparte, Kid Simius)
- 2024: From The Archives #001 (Studio Bonaparte, Bonaparte)
- 2025: Schwarze Schafe - Die Serie (Soundtrack)
- 2025: From The Archives #002 - The Kumasi Sessions (Fun In The Church)
