= ITunes LP =

Interactive album artwork format by Apple

iTunes LP
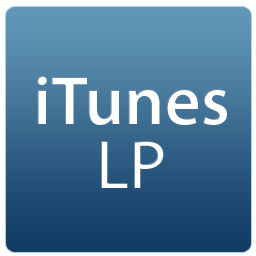
- Developer: Apple Inc.
- Release: September 9, 2009
- Website: apple.com/au/itunes/working-itunes/enhance/lps

iTunes LP (referred to in pre-launch press by the code name Cocktail) is a format for interactive album artwork introduced by Apple Inc. on September 9, 2009. It is similar to the CMX format being developed by the three major record labels, and operates within the iTunes 9 to iTunes 12 software, allowing the user to view multimedia elements alongside the music. This format is also used to bundle extra content (known as iTunes Extras) with selected movies at the iTunes Store.

iTunes LP downloads use a proprietary file format with the extension .itlp, which is essentially a WebArchive adhering to special conventions using HTML, CSS, JavaScript, CSS Animations, and plists. This technology is referred to in iTunes LP files as TuneKit. On November 28, 2009, the iTunes LP SDK was released to the public.

In 2011, MTV introduced the O Music Awards, intended for artists, fans, and innovators at this online awards show. One of the OMAs' inaugural categories was Best iTunes LP. The winner of this category was the deluxe edition of Pink's Greatest Hits... So Far!!!

Apple stopped accepting new submissions of iTunes LPs after March 2018. Existing LPs were deprecated from the store during the remainder of 2018. Customers who have previously purchased an album containing an iTunes LP would still be able to download the additional content using iTunes Match.

== iTunes LP list ==
=== 0–9 ===
- 3 Doors Down – Time of My Life
- Thirty Seconds to Mars – This Is War
- 50 Cent – Before I Self Destruct

=== A–B ===
- A-ha – 25: The Very Best Of
- Above & Beyond – Group Therapy
- Adam Lambert – For Your Entertainment
- Adam Lambert – Trespassing
- Aerosmith – Music From Another Dimension!
- AFI – Crash Love
- Alesana – A Place Where the Sun Is Silent
- Alex Band – We've All Been There
- Alice in Chains – Black Gives Way to Blue
- Alicia Keys – Songs in A Minor
- All Sons & Daughters – Live
- Alt-J – An Awesome Wave
- Andrew Lloyd Webber – Love Never Dies
- Anthrax – Worship Music
- Antony & The Johnsons – Swanlights
- Aphex Twin -Syro
- Augustana – Augustana
- Avenged Sevenfold – Nightmare
- Avril Lavigne – Goodbye Lullaby
- Avril Lavigne – Avril Lavigne
- Axelle Red – Un coeur comme le mien
- Ayọ – Billie-Eve
- B.o.B – Don't Let Me Fall (EP)
- The Baseballs – Strings 'n' Stripes
- The Beach Boys – The Smile Sessions
- Beady Eye – Different Gear, Still Speeding
- The Beatles – The Beatles Box Set
- The Beatles – Please Please Me
- The Beatles – With The Beatles
- The Beatles – A Hard Day's Night
- The Beatles – Beatles For Sale
- The Beatles – Help!
- The Beatles – Rubber Soul
- The Beatles – Revolver
- The Beatles – Sgt. Pepper's Lonely Hearts Club Band
- The Beatles – Magical Mystery Tour
- The Beatles – The Beatles (White Album)
- The Beatles – Yellow Submarine
- The Beatles – Abbey Road
- The Beatles – Let It Be
- The Beatles – Past Masters
- The Beatles – Anthology Box Set
- The Beatles – Anthology 1
- The Beatles – Anthology 2
- The Beatles – Anthology 3
- The Beatles – LOVE
- The Beatles – 1962-1966
- The Beatles – 1967-1970
- The Beatles – 1
- The Beatles - The U.S. Albums
- Beatsteaks – Boom Box
- Ben Folds & Nick Hornby – Lonely Avenue
- Between the Buried and Me – The Parallax II: Future Sequence
- Beyoncé – 4
- Biffy Clyro – Only Revolutions
- The Black Crowes – Croweology
- Blessthefall – Awakening
- Blue Rodeo – The Things We Left Behind
- Bluejuice – Company
- Bob Dylan – Highway 61 Revisited
- Bob Dylan – Tempest
- Bon Jovi – Greatest Hits: The Ultimate Collection
- Booba – Lunatic
- Boy & Bear – Moonfire
- Brad Paisley – This Is Country Music
- Brandy – Two Eleven
- Britney Spears – Femme Fatale
- Britney Spears – Britney Jean
- Britney Spears – Glory
- Britt Nicole – Gold
- Broken Bells – Broken Bells
- Brooke Fraser – Flags
- Bruce Springsteen – The Promise: The Darkness On the Edge of Town Story
- Bruce Springsteen – Wrecking Ball
- Bruno Mars – Doo-Wops & Hooligans
- Bruno Mars – Just the Way You Are
- Bryan Ferry – Olympia
- Buddy Guy – Living Proof

=== C–G ===
- Cage the Elephant – Thank You Happy Birthday
- Cali – La vie est une truite arc-en-ciel qui nage dans mon cœur
- Calle 13 – Entren Los Que Quieran
- Carlos Baute – Amarte Bien
- Charlotte Gainsbourg – IRM
- Charly García – 60x60
- The Chemical Brothers – Further
- Chris Brown – F.A.M.E.
- Chelsea Grin - My Damnation
- Chris Brown – Fortune
- Chris Young - Neon
- Christina Aguilera – Bionic
- Christina Aguilera – Lotus
- Christophe Maé – On trace la route
- Christy Moore – Folk Tale
- Ciara – Ciara
- The Civil Wars - Barton Hollow
- The Civil Wars - The Civil Wars
- The Clash – Sound System
- Cro – Raop
- Cold Cave – Cherish the Light Years
- Cocoon – Where the Oceans End
- Daddy Yankee – Mundail
- Daft Punk – Random Access Memories
- Danger Mouse & Sparklehorse – Dark Night of the Soul
- Danny Fernandes – AutomaticLUV
- Dave Matthews Band – Big Whiskey and the GrooGrux King
- Dave Stewart – The Blackbird Diaries
- David Cook – This Loud Morning
- Deadmau5 – 4x4=12
- Deadmau5 – Album Title Goes Here
- Def Leppard – Mirror Ball: Live & More
- Depeche Mode – Delta Machine
- Derek & The Dominos – Layla and Other Assorted Love Songs
- Deuce – Nine Lives
- Devo – Something for Everybody
- Die Ärzte – Auch
- Die drei ??? – Die drei ???, Folge 137: Pfad der Angst
- Disturbed – Asylum
- The Doors – The Doors: 40th Anniversary Mixes
- Elbow – Build a Rocket Boys!
- Eli Young Band – Life At Best
- Eliza Doolittle – Eliza Doolittle (EP)
- Ellie Goulding - Halcyon
- Ellis Marsalis – An Open Letter To Thelonious
- Elton John and Leon Russell – The Union
- Elvis Presley – Viva Elvis
- Emmylou Harris – Hard Bargain
- Eric Clapton – Clapton
- Eric Prydz – Eric Prydz Presents Pryda
- Eskimo Joe – Ghosts of the Past
- Eve 6 – Speak in Code
- Every Avenue – Bad Habits
- Die Fantastischen Vier – Für dich immer noch Fanta Sie
- Fettes Brot – Fettes
- Fettes Brot – Brot
- Fiona Apple – The Idler Wheel...
- Foals – Total Life Forever
- For Today – Immortal
- Foster the People – Torches
- Francesca Battistelli – Hundred More Years
- Francesco Tristano – BachCage
- Frida Gold – Juwel
- Gavin DeGraw – Sweeter
- George Harrison and friends – The Concert for Bangladesh
- George Harrison – The Apple Years 1968–75 box set
- George Michael – Faith
- Girls' Generation – I Got a Boy
- Glasvegas – Euphoric /// Heartbreak \\\
- Glee Cast – Glee: The Music, The Graduation Album
- Gloria Trevi – Gloria
- Gorillaz – On Melancholy Hill (EP)
- Gorillaz – Plastic Beach
- Gotan Project – Tango 3.0
- Grateful Dead – American Beauty
- Gregory Porter – Liquid Spirit
- Grinderman – Grinderman 2
- GUNSHIP – GUNSHIP

=== H–M ===
- Harry Hill – Funny Times
- Heart – Red Velvet Car
- Hillsong Live – God Is Able (Live)
- Hillsong Live – Cornerstone (Live)
- Hillsong United – Aftermath
- Hillsong United – Zion
- Hinder – All American Nightmare
- Hot Chelle Rae – Whatever
- Hugh Laurie – Let Them Talk
- Imagine Dragons - Night Visions (Deluxe Edition)
- Incubus – If Not Now, When?
- Iron Maiden – The Final Frontier
- Isaac Carree – Uncommon Me
- Israel Houghton – Love God. Love People.
- In Flames - Siren Charms
- Jack Johnson – En Concert
- Jacques Dutronc – Et vous, et vous, et vous...
- Jake Owen – Days of Gold
- James Blunt – Some Kind of Trouble
- Jamie Foxx – Best Night of My Life
- Jamie Woon – Mirrorwriting
- Janelle Monáe – The ArchAndroid (Suites II and III)
- Jason Aldean – My Kinda Party
- Jason Derulo – What If (EP)
- Jay-Z – The Blueprint 3
- JBO – Killeralbum
- Jean-Louis Aubert – Roc' éclair
- Jeff Beck – Emotion & Commotion
- Jehro – Cantina Paradise
- Jennifer Hudson – I Remember Me
- Jennifer Lopez – Dance Again... the Hits
- Jennifer Rostock – Mit Haut und Haar
- Jill Scott – The Light of the Sun
- Jimi Hendrix – Valleys of Neptune
- The Jimi Hendrix Experience – Winterland (Live)
- Joachim Witt – DOM
- John Butler Trio – April Uprising
- John Lennon – Power to the People: The Hits
- John Lennon and Yoko Ono – Double Fantasy Stripped Down
- John Mayer – Battle Studies (album)
- Johnny Hallyday – Jamais seul
- Josh Groban – Illuminations
- Joy Division – +- Singles 1978-80
- Juanes – P.A.R.C.E.
- Julieta Venegas – Otra Cosa
- Justin Timberlake – The 20/20 Experience
- Justin Timberlake – The 20/20 Experience – 2 of 2
- Justin Timberlake – The 20/20 Experience – The Complete Experience
- k.d. lang – Recollection
- Keane – Night Train
- Kenny Chesney – Hemingway's Whiskey
- Kenny Chesney – The Big Revival
- Keren Ann – 101
- Kesha – Cannibal
- Kesha – Animal + Cannibal
- Kesha – Warrior
- Kidz Bop Kids – Kidz Bop 20
- Kimbra – Vows
- Kings of Leon – Come Around Sundown
- Kirk Franklin – Hello Fear
- The Kooks – Junk of the Heart
- Korn – Korn III: Remember Who You Are
- Kristin Chenoweth – Some Lessons Learned
- KT Tunstall – Tiger Suit
- Kusuo – ±1
- Kylie Minogue – Aphrodite
- Lady Gaga - Born This Way
- Lang Lang – Live in Vienna
- Laura Marling – I Speak Because I Can
- Laura Marling – A Creature I Don't Know
- Lauren Pritchard – Wasted In Jackson
- Lenka – Two
- Lenny Kravitz – Black and White America
- Lifehouse – Smoke & Mirrors
- Linkin Park – A Thousand Suns
- Los Lonely Boys – Rockpango
- M.I.A. – Maya
- McAlister Kemp – Country Proud
- Madina Lake – World War III
- Madonna – Sticky & Sweet Tour
- The Maine – Black & White
- The Maine – In Darkness and in Light
- Maná – Drama Y Luz
- Manchester Orchestra – Simple Math
- Mariah Carey – Memoirs of an Imperfect Angel
- Mark Ronson & The Business Intl. – Record Collection
- Mark Ruff Ryder Presents – Mark Ruff Ryder
- Mary Mary – Something Big
- Masayoshi Yamazaki (山崎まさよし) – Hobo's Music
- Massive Attack – Heligoland
- Matt Cardle – Letters
- MGMT – MGMT
- Michael Franti & Spearhead – The Sound of Sunshine
- Michael Jackson – Michael
- Michael Jackson – Michael Jackson's Vision
- Middle Brother – Middle Brother
- Miguel – Kaleidoscope Dream
- Miike Snow – "Happy to You"
- Mika – The Boy Who Knew Too Much
- Mike Posner – 31 Minutes to Takeoff
- Miles Davis – Bitches Brew
- Miley Cyrus – Bangerz
- Miloš Karadaglić – Miloš
- MiMi – Road To Last Night
- Miranda Lambert – Platinum
- Mirrors – Lights and Offerings
- Moby – Destroyed
- Moby – Innocents
- Monica – New Life
- Muse – The Resistance
- My Chemical Romance – Danger Days: The True Lives of the Fabulous Killjoys
- My Morning Jacket – Circuital

=== N–S ===
- Negramaro –Casa 69
- Never Shout Never – Harmony
- Never Shout Never – Melody
- Nine Inch Nails - Hesitation Marks
- NKOTBSB –NKOTBSB
- Noel Gallagher – Noel Gallagher's High Flying Birds
- Norah Jones – Come Away with Me
- Oasis – Time Flies... 1994-2009
- Oh Land – Oh Land
- OneRepublic – Waking Up
- One Direction – Up All Night
- One Direction – Take Me Home
- One Direction – Midnight Memories
- The Overtones – Good Ol' Fashioned Love
- Pantera – Cowboys from Hell
- Paolo Nutini – Sunny Side Up
- Papa VS Pretty – United In Isolation
- Paramore – Brand New Eyes
- Paul McCartney – Good Evening New York City
- Paul van Dyk – Gatecrasher Anthems - Paul Van Dyk
- Pearl Jam – Backspacer
- Pearl Jam – Live on Ten Legs
- Pearl Jam – Vs. & Vitalogy
- Pendulum – Immersion
- Pete Yorn – Musicforthemorningafter
- Peter Bjorn and John – Gimme Some
- Peter Frampton – Frampton Comes Alive!
- Peter Gabriel – So
- Peter Gabriel – Scratch My Back
- Phil Collins – Going Back
- Pink – Greatest Hits... So Far!!! (Pink album)
- Pink – The Truth About Love
- Pink Floyd – Meddle
- Pink Floyd - The Dark Side of the Moon
- Pink Floyd – Wish You Were Here
- Pink Floyd - The Wall
- Pitbull – Planet Pit
- Plan B – The Defamation of Strickland Banks
- P.O.D. – Murdered Love
- Powderfinger – Golden Rule
- Primal Scream – Screamadelica
- Professor Green – I Need You Tonight (EP)
- Professor Green – Just Be Good to Green (EP)
- Queen – Queen
- Queen – Queen II
- Queen – Sheer Heart Attack
- Queen – A Night at the Opera
- Queen – A Day at the Races
- Queen – News of the World
- Queen – Jazz
- Queen – The Game
- Queen – Flash Gordon
- Queen – Hot Space
- R. Kelly – Love Letter
- R.E.M. – Collapse Into Now
- Radiohead – OK Computer
- Raphael Saadiq – Stone Rollin'
- The Rat Pack – The Very Best of the Rat Pack
- Ravi Shankar and George Harrison – Collaborations
- Ray Davies – See My Friends
- The Red Jumpsuit Apparatus – Am I the Enemy
- Regina Spektor – Live In London
- Robbie Williams – In and Out of Consciousness: Greatest Hits 1990–2010
- Roll Deep – Good Times (EP)
- The Rolling Stones – Get Yer Ya-Ya's Out! The Rolling Stones in Concert
- The Rolling Stones – Exile on Main St.
- Ronnie Dunn – Ronnie Dunn
- Roy Orbison – The Monument Singles Collection
- Rumer – Seasons of My Soul
- Santana – Guitar Heaven: The Greatest Guitar Classics of All Time
- Sara Evans – Stronger
- Saves the Day – Daybreak
- Seal – 6: Commitment
- Selena Gomez & the Scene – When the Sun Goes Down
- Serge Gainsbourg – Intégrale: Serge Gainsbourg
- Serj Tankian – Elect the Dead Symphony
- Serj Tankian – Imperfect Harmonies
- Shakira – She Wolf
- Shinee – Chapter 1. Dream Girl – The Misconceptions of You
- Sido – MTV Unplugged Live aus'm MV
- Sigur Rós – Valtari
- Sir Simon Rattle & Berliner Philharmoniker – Tchaikovsky: The Nutcracker: Complete Ballet
- Simply Red – Farewell (Live at Sydney Opera House)
- Sixx:A.M. – This Is Gonna Hurt
- Skunk Anansie – Wonderlustre
- Sky Ferreira – One (EP)
- Slow Club – Paradise)
- Smashing Pumpkins – Oceania
- Snoop Dogg – More Malice
- Something for Kate – Leave Your Soul to Science
- Soundgarden – Telephantasm
- Steel Panther - "All You Can Eat"
- Stevie Nicks – In Your Dreams
- The Strokes – Angles
- Suede – Suede
- Suede – Dog Man Star
- Suede – Coming Up
- Sugarland – The Incredible Machine
- The Summer Set – Everything's Fine
- Superfly – Wildflower & Cover Songs: Complete Best 'Track 3'
- Swedish House Mafia – Until One
- Syd Barrett – An Introduction to Syd Barrett
- Sylvie Vartan – Soleil bleu

=== T–Z ===
- Take That – Progress
- Talib Kweli & Hi-Tek – Reflection Eternal: Revolutions Per Minute
- Tame Impala – Innerspeaker
- Taylor Swift – Fearless
- Taylor Swift – Red
- Tedeschi Trucks Band – Revelator
- Thees Uhlmann – Thees Uhlmann
- These Kids Wear Crowns – Jumpstart
- Three Days Grace - Transit of Venus
- Thomas D – Lektionen in Demut 11.0
- Till Brönner – At the End of the Day
- Tim Bendzko – Wenn Worte meine Sprache wären
- Times of Grace – The Hymn of a Broken Man
- Tinie Tempah – Pass Out (EP)
- Tinie Tempah – Frisky (EP)
- tobyMac – Eye On It
- Tom Petty & The Heartbreakers – The Live Anthology
- Tom Petty & The Heartbreakers – Mojo
- Toploader – Only Human
- Tori Amos – Night of Hunters
- Train – California 37
- Trey Songz – Passion, Pain & Pleasure
- Trin-i-tee 5:7 – Angel & Chanelle
- Tyrese – Tyrese Gibson's Mayhem! (Comic Book #1 & Single)
- Tyrese – Tyrese Gibson's Mayhem! (Comic Book #2 & Single)
- Tyrese – Tyrese Gibson's Mayhem! (Comic Book #3 & Single)
- Underoath – Ø (Disambiguation)
- Underworld – Barking
- Usher – Raymond v. Raymond
- Usher – Looking 4 Myself
- Vanessa Carlton – Rabbits on the Run
- Various Artists – The Brit Awards Album 2011 (Plus Bonus BRITs School Tracks)
- Various Artists – Gift Wrapped, Vol. II: Snowed In
- Various Artists – Introducing the Classical Guide
- Various Artists – iTunes Holiday Sampler
- Various Artists – iTunes Festival: London 2010
- Various Artists – Now That's What I Call Xmas!
- Various Artists – Old Grey Whistle Test (40th Anniversary)
- Various Artists – Revolution Overdrive: Songs of Liberty
- Various Artists – StarCraft II: Wings of Liberty soundtrack
- Various Artists – Twistable, Turnable Man: A Musical Tribute to the Songs of Shel Silverstein
- Vasco Rossi – Vivere o niente
- Véronique Sanson – Plusieurs lunes
- "Weird Al" Yankovic – Alpocalypse
- The Who – Quadrophenia
- Wings & Paul McCartney – Band on the Run (Remastered)
- The Wombats – The Wombats Proudly Present: This Modern Glitch
- Wonder Girls – Wonder Party
- Yael Naïm – She Was a Boy
- Yannick Noah – Frontières
- You Me At Six – Sinners Never Sleep
- You Me At Six – Cavalier Youth (Deluxe Edition)
- Zac Brown Band – You Get What You Give
- Zazie – Za7ie
- Zero 7 – Record: The Best of Zero 7
- Zoé – MTV Unplugged: Música de Fondo
