= Thees Uhlmann =

German musician and author (born 1974)

Thees Uhlmann & Band
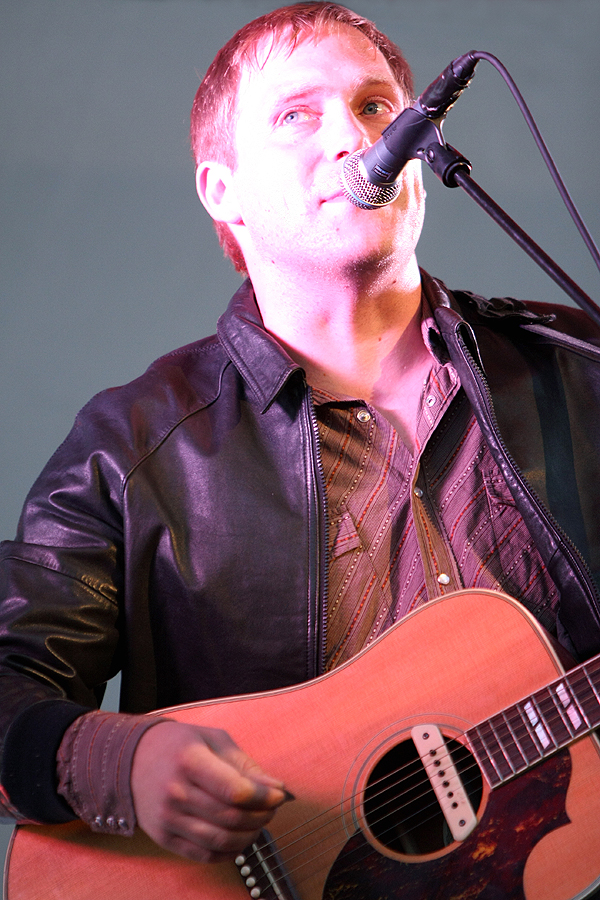
- Uhlmann, 2008

Background information
- Origin: Hemmoor, Germany
- Genres: Rock'n'roll, indie rock
- Years active: 2010–present
- Labels: Grand Hotel van Cleef, Hidden Pony
- Members: Thees Uhlmann; Nikolai Potthoff; Markus Perner; Nitzan Hoffmann; Hubert Steiner; Martin Kelly
- Website: www.theesuhlmann.de

Thees Uhlmann (born April 16, 1974 in Hemmoor, Lower Saxony) is a German musician and author. He is a founding member of the indie-pop band Tomte and also writes for the magazines Intro, Visions, Spex and Musikexpress.

== 1987-2011: Tomte, various projects ==
Singer-songwriter Thees Uhlmann helped form the Hamburg-based band Tomte in the late-eighties under a different name. The band spent most of the nineties recording demo songs and EPs, releasing their debut record in 1998. They did not receive major chart success until 2006's Buchstaben über der Stadt.

In 1999, he accompanied the indie-rock band Tocotronic on their K.O.O.K-tour and he wrote a tour diary called Wir könnten Freunde werden ("We could become friends"). With Marcus Wiebusch and Reimer Bustorff of Kettcar he founded the label Grand Hotel van Cleef in 2002 which presents an annual festival named "Fest van Cleef". In 2005 he shot the film Keine Lieder über Liebe (No Songs of Love) with the German actors Jürgen Vogel and Heike Makatsch. He played guitar in the fictional band "Hansen", which brought out an album also called Keine Lieder über Liebe.

== 2011-2013: Debut solo album ==
In the summer of 2011, striking out as a solo act for the first time since the incarnation of his rock band Tomte, Uhlmann featured on rapper Casper's 2011 album XOXO. One month later, his debut album was released. The record was composed almost entirely on the piano as opposed to his signature acoustic guitar. In an interview with Rolling Stone, Uhlmann stated that after a major performance with his band, each member went their own way to work on different projects: "It [the album] would certainly sell better if I could say that there were terrible fights, and then in six years there will be some a reunion special, but it wasn't like that. All of us had a lot going on in our lives at this time." The album, which also features Casper, was released to critical acclaim and chart success in Germany, peaking at #4 and remaining on the charts for two months. The album achieved minor success in Austria, where it broke the Top 20, but did not manage to chart in Switzerland. Uhlmann toured throughout 2011 to support the album.

== 2013-present: #2, Touring ==
In 2013, Uhlmann began playing new material that would end up comprising his second solo record. In an interview with Der Spiegel, Uhlmann stated that his music is not the most modern-sounding in the world, but that he prefers it that way, also stating later that he does want his music to be coded and inaccessible. His second album, #2, was released in August of that year and was promoted by constant touring throughout German-speaking Europe. It, appropriately, reached #2 on the German Album Charts and also reaching the Top 5 in Austria. The album was not as successful in Switzerland, where it only remained on the charts for one week. The record was heavily influenced by American singer-songwriter Bruce Springsteen, both in sound and visuals. The album jacket pays homage to Springsteen's 1975 landmark album Born to Run. The music video for single Am 07. März (On the 7th of March), parodies pop culture and major milestones in history including the fall of the Berlin Wall, the films of Spike Lee, and the recording of "We Are the World". Despite the album being released to positive reviews from music critics, neither the leading-single nor the follow-up Zugvögel (Migrant Birds) charted. Simon Langemann of Laut wrote of the album that Uhlmann & Band had matured and refocused their direction, stating that the end-result is, at times, more successful than the first record. In March 2015, Uhlmann announced the October release for a novel he had written that "has nothing to do with me or my music." Uhlmann also announced a book tour.

== Discography ==
The official discography, including his work with Tomte, consists of nine studio albums, two compilation albums, thirteen singles and seventeen music videos.

Thees Uhlmann discography
- Studio albums: 3
- Singles: 2
- Music videos: 1

=== Albums ===
Year	Album details	Chart peaks		Certifications (sales thresholds)
Year	Album details	GER	AUT	Certifications (sales thresholds)
2011	Thees Uhlmann: Released: 26 August 2011; Label: Grand Hotel van Cleef; Format: CD, LP, digital download	4	16	
2013	#2: Released: 30 August 2013; Label: Grand Hotel van Cleef; Format: CD, LP, digital download	2	5	
2019	Junkies und Scientologen: Released: 20 September 2019; Label: Grand Hotel van Cleef; Format: CD, LP, digital download, streaming	2	22	
"—" denotes a release that did not chart.

=== Singles ===
Year	Title	Album	chart peaks
Year	Title	Album	GER
2011	"To Mate & To Die Salmons Swim Upstream": Released: 17 June 2011	Thees Uhlmann (Special Edition)	—
2011	"Zum Laichen und Sterben ziehen die Lachse den Fluss hinauf": Released: 19 August 2011	Thees Uhlmann	52
2011	"& Jay-Z singt uns ein Lied" (featuring Casper): Released: 4 November 2011	Thees Uhlmann	—
2012	"Das Mädchen von Kasse 2": Released: 16 March 2012	Thees Uhlmann	—
2013	"Am 7. März": Released: 16 August 2013	#2	—
2013	"Zugvögel": Released: 8 November 2013	#2	—

== Published works ==
- Uhlmann, Thees (2000). Die Tocotronic-Tourtagebücher : Wir könnten Freunde werden [The Tocotronic Tour Diaries : we could become friends] (in German) (1st ed.). Mainz: Ventil Verlag. ISBN 978-3-930559-79-4. OCLC 52517307.
- Uhlmann, Thees (2015). Sophia, der Tod und ich [Sophia, Death and I] (1st ed.). Köln: Kiepenheuer & Witsch. ISBN 978-3-462047-93-6.
