= No. 2 (Thees Uhlmann album) =

#2

Studio album by Thees Uhlmann
- Released: August 30, 2013
- Genre: Indie rock, rock, acoustic
- Label: Grand Hotel Van Cleef
- Producer: Tobias Kuhn

Thees Uhlmann chronology
Thees Uhlmann (2011)	#2 (2013)

Singles from #2
- 1. "Die Bomben meiner Stadt" Released: 9 August 2013; 2. "Im Sommer nach dem Krieg" Released: 23 August 2013; 3. "Am 07. März" Released: 23 August 2013; 4. "Zugvögel" Released: 8 November 2013; 5. "Es brennt" Released: 7 March 2014

Professional ratings
Review scores
Source	Rating
Langweile Dich	3/5 stars
Motor	3.5/5 stars
Musikexpress	3/5 stars
Plattentests	7/10

#2 is the second solo record from German singer-songwriter Thees Uhlmann released on Uhlmann's own Grand Hotel van Cleef Records. The album was produced by Tobian Kuhn. Of the album's production, Uhlmann stated that he often would write the first lyrics of a song and wait for Kuhn's reaction. Once satisfied, they would continue the rest of the piece. The album was a critical and commercial success in Uhlmann's native Germany, reaching #2 on the German Albums Chart.

== Track listing ==
All lyrics are written by Thees Uhlmann; all music is composed by Uhlmann and Tobias Kuhn

No.	Title	Length
1.	"Zugvögel"	3:40
2.	"Die Bomben meiner Stadt"	3:01
3.	"Im Sommer Nach Dem Krieg"	3:43
4.	"Es brennt"	4:33
5.	"Am 07. März"	3:14
6.	"Der Fluss und das Meer"	4:19
7.	"Weiße Knöchel"	4:15
8.	"Trommlerman"	3:34
9.	"Zerschmettert in Stücke (Im Frieden der Nacht)"	5:58
10.	"Kaffee & Wein"	3:39
11.	"Ich gebe auf mein Licht"	5:07
Total length:		45:03

== Charts ==
Country	Peak position
Austrian Albums Chart	5
German Albums Chart	2
Swiss Albums Chart	96
