= Zum Laichen und Sterben ziehen die Lachse den Fluss hinauf =

Single by Thees Uhlmann

from the album Thees Uhlmann
- Released: 11 August 2011
- Recorded: 2011
- Length: 3:40 (album version)
- Label: Grand Hotel Van Cleef
- Songwriters: Lyrics: Thees Uhlmann; Music: Thees Uhlmann, Tobias Kuhn
- Producer: Tobias Kuhn

Thees Uhlmann singles chronology
"Zum Laichen und Sterben ziehen die Lachse den Fluss hinauf" (2011)	"& Jay-Z singt uns ein Lied" (2011)

Music video
- "Zum Laichen und Sterben ziehen die Lachse den Fluss hinauf" on YouTube

"Zum Laichen und Sterben ziehen die Lachse den Fluss hinauf" (eng: To Mate and Die the Salmons Swim Upstream) is the debut single from German singer-songwriter Thees Uhlmann released in the summer of 2011. After Uhlmann's band Tomte went on hiatus, Uhlmann began work on material, working with Tobias Kuhn on what would become his eponymous solo album.

== Production and lyrics ==
The song was initially released on a limited edition 7" single sung in English. The song was later released in its German form as the lead single from the Thees Uhlmann album. The lyrics, written entirely by Uhlmann, describe a feeling of instability and longing, which are common themes throughout its parent record. Uhlmann was quoted in interviews as saying that he is unsure of where he considers his home to be. A native of Hemmoor, Uhlmann said that he does not consider it to be his home anymore. Regardless of this, the lyrics do describe a sense of nostalgia for his upbringing. The song is a dramatic piano and guitar-driven pop tune heavily influenced by the song of American rock-singer Bruce Springsteen. Following the song's release, Uhlmann has been referred to as the "German Springsteen" in the media, something he continues to poke fun at.

== Critical reception and chart performance ==
Rolling Stone gave the song a positive review, stating that the song had Uhlmann's original charm and that the lyrics were those that "one couldn't imagine ever being sung." They regarded the song as one of the highlights from the album. To date, it is Uhlmann's only solo single to chart in his native Germany, peaking at No. 52 over an impressive run of seven weeks. The song was played on his tours supporting both his first and second albums. The song placed 8th in the 2011 Bundesvision Song Contest, one place below pop-band Frida Gold.

== Charts ==
Chart (2011)	Peak position
German Singles Chart	52
