= Lady Luck (Jamie Woon song) =

Single by Jamie Woon

from the album Mirrorwriting
- Released: 21 February 2011
- Recorded: The Way, River Recording; (London, England)
- Length: 4:08
- Label: Candent Songs; Polydor
- Songwriters: Jamie Woon; Nemo Jones
- Producers: Jamie Woon; Will Bevan; Royce Wood, Jr.

Jamie Woon singles chronology
"Night Air" (2010)	"Lady Luck" (2011)

"Lady Luck" is a song by British singer Jamie Woon released as the second single from his debut album, Mirrorwriting.

== Formats and track listings ==
- EP
1. "Lady Luck" (Original) — 4:08
2. "Lady Luck" (Royce Wood JR Retwix) — 4:03
3. "Lady Luck" (Hudson Mohawke's Schmink-Wolf Re-Fix) — 3:32
4. "Lady Luck" (Débruit's Suave Remix) — 3:11
5. "Lady Luck" (MightyB Remix) — 6:30
- 7" vinyl
1. "Lady Luck" — 4:08

== Credits and personnel ==
- Main vocals – Jamie Woon
- Main production – Will Bevan
- Written by – Jamie Woon, Nemo Jones
- Mastered by – Stuart Hawkes
- Mixed by (assisted by) – Tim Roberts
- Mixed by, engineer – John Hanes
- Additional production – Royce Wood, Jr., Will Bevan
- Programmed by – Jamie Woon, Will Bevan

== Charts ==
Chart (2011–12)	Peak Position
Belgium (Ultratop 50 Flanders)	29
Belgium (Ultratip Bubbling Under Wallonia)	23
Denmark (Tracklisten)	14
German Youth Airplay Chart	32
Hungary (Dance Top 40)	37
Hungary (Rádiós Top 40)	12
Netherlands (Single Top 100)	56
Romania (Romanian Top 100)	89
UK Singles (Official Charts)	76
