= Kilians =

German indie rock band

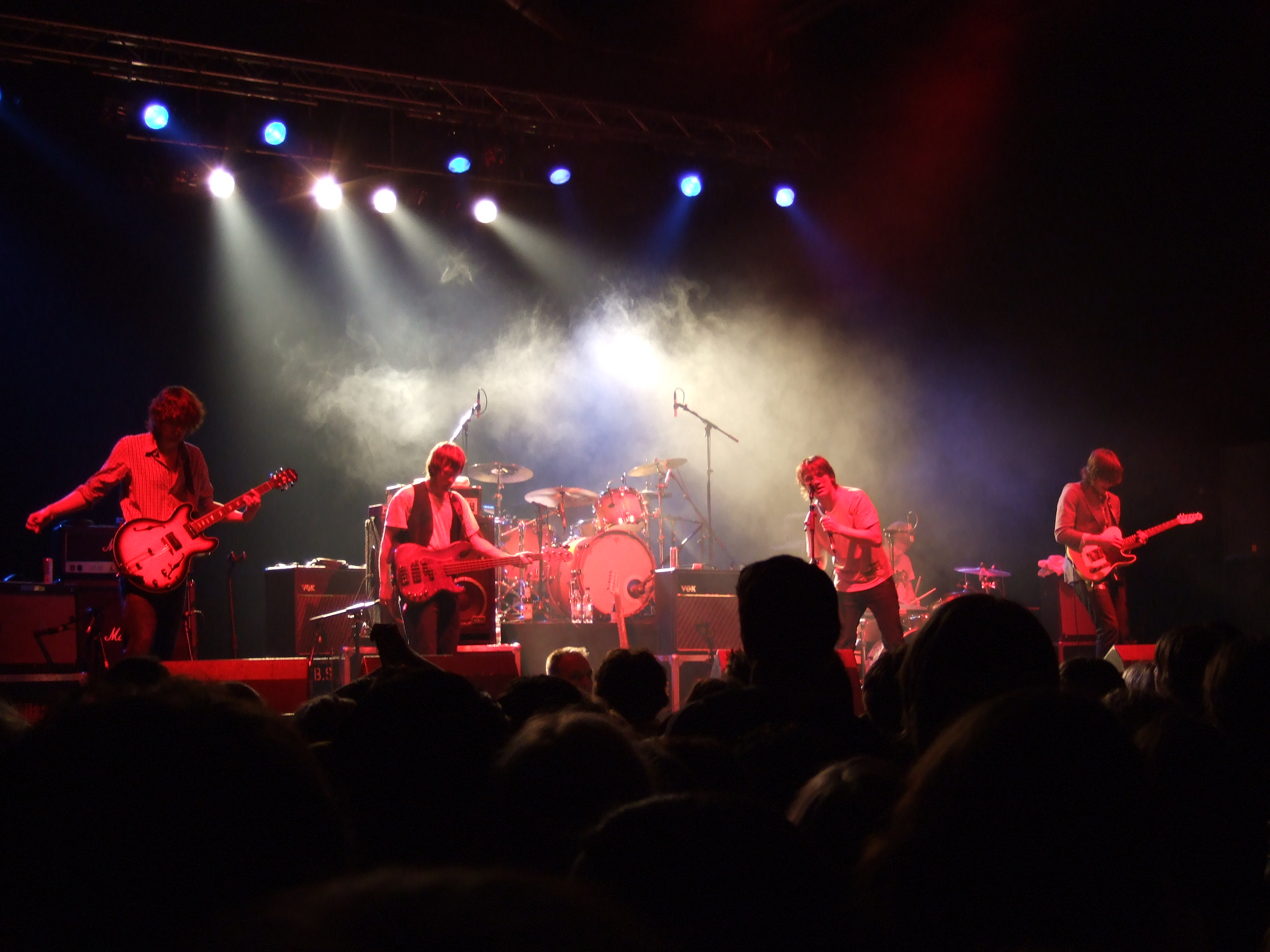
- Kilians opening for Babyshambles in Berlin

Background information
- Origin: Dinslaken, Germany
- Genres: Indie rock Garage rock
- Years active: 2005–2013, 2017
- Labels: Vertigo Records/Universal
- Members: Simon den Hartog; Dominic Lorberg; Gordian Scholz; Michael Schürmann; Arne Schult
- Website: http://www.thekilians.de

Kilians were a German alternative rock band. They started out as a loose group of music mad students from Dinslaken, Germany. In 2005, the band's line-up stabilised and they recorded their first self-titled EP. In the following year their song 'Jealous Lover' reached number 3 of the German CampusCharts.

In 2006, Thees Uhlmann of Tomte discovered Kilians and invited them to support his band on their spring tour. On this tour Kilians sold 700 copies of their EP. Uhlmann later became Kilians' manager.

In August 2006, Kilians toured Germany in a bus sponsored by Austrian energy drink manufacturer Red Bull. They played several small guerrilla gigs on camping sites adjacent to various music festivals.

When the band released their first professionally merchandised EP 'Fight the Start' on 17 April 2007, the band changed their name, which is derived from a character of Carl Zuckmayer's play The Captain of Köpenick (play), from 'The Kilians' to 'Kilians'.

In summer 2007, Kilians once again toured Germany and played at Rock am Ring and other festivals.

The band's debut album Kill the Kilians was released on 7 September 2007 and reached number 75 of the official German music charts.

Their second album They Are Calling Your Name was released on 10 April 2009. It reached number 32 of the German albums charts and spent two weeks in the charts.

On March 2, 2017, the band's record label announced via Facebook that the band would be embarking on a six-date small tour in June 2017 to celebrate the 10th anniversary of their debut album "Kill the Kilians."

== Discography ==
=== Albums ===
Year	Album details	Peak chart positions		
Year	Album details	GER		
2007	Kill the Kilians: Released: 7 September 2007; Label: Vertigo Berlin/Universal; Format: CD	75		
2009	They Are Calling Your Name: Released: 10 April 2009; Label: Vertigo Berlin/Universal; Format: CD	3Singles2012	Lines You Should Not Cross: Released: 31 August 2012; Label: Vertigo Berlin/Universal; Format: CD	xx

Year	Single	Peak chart positions
Year	Single	GER
2007	"Fight the Start"	-
2007	"Enforce Yourself"	-
2007	"When Will I Ever Get Home"	-
2008	"Sunday"	-
2009	"Said and Done"	93
2009	"Hometown"	-
