= Making Time (album) =

Studio album by Jamie Woon
- Released: 6 November 2015
- Recorded: Konk Studios, Hornsey; Ameraycan Studios, Hollywood; Osea Island Studio, Essex; The Black Lodge Studio, Leeds
- Length: 41:08
- Label: Polydor
- Producer: Alex Dromgoole; Jamie Woon

Jamie Woon chronology
Mirrorwriting (2011)	Making Time (2015)	3, 10, Why, When (2025)

Singles from Making Time
- 1. "Sharpness" Released: 21 August 2015

Professional ratings
Aggregate scores
Source	Rating
Metacritic	71/100
Review scores
Source	Rating
AllMusic	4/5 stars
Clash	8/10
Drowned in Sound	6/10
The Guardian	4/5 stars
NME	3/5 stars
Pitchfork	7.4/10

Making Time is the second studio album by British singer Jamie Woon. It was released on 6 November 2015 through Polydor Records. It was preceded by the single "Sharpness" on 21 August 2015. Making Time was nominated for the 2016 Mercury Prize.

== Critical reception ==
At Metacritic, which assigns a weighted average score out of 100 to reviews from mainstream critics, Making Time received an average score of 71 out of 100 based on 12 reviews, indicating "generally favorable reviews".

Britt Julious of Pitchfork gave the album a 7.4 out of 10, describing it as "a testament to the strength of traditional music composition: simple guitars, slinky bass lines, and sophisticated songwriting." Lanre Bakare of The Guardian gave the album 4 stars out of 5, writing, "Woon might have been expected to return with a dancefloor-focused second album, but instead he's taken the soul road, and it sounds like a brilliant statement of intent."

NPR named it one of the "Top 10 Slept-On R&B Albums of 2015".

== Track listing ==
Making Time track listing
No.	Title	Writer(s)	Producer(s)	Length
1.	"Message"	Jamie Woon; Dan See; John O'Kane	Woon; Alex Dromgoole	4:29
2.	"Movement"	Woon; O'Kane	Woon; Dromgoole	5:12
3.	"Sharpness" (featuring Robin Hannibal)	Woon; Robin Hannibal	Woon; Dromgoole; Hannibal	3:27
4.	"Celebration" (featuring Willy Mason)	Woon; Willy Mason	Woon; Dromgoole	4:50
5.	"Lament" (featuring Royce Wood Junior)	Woon; James Woods	Woon; Woods^{[a]}	3:37
6.	"Forgiven"	Woon; Mason	Woon; Dromgoole	3:21
7.	"Little Wonder"	Woon; Nemo Jones	Woon; Dromgoole	3:07
8.	"Thunder"	Woon	Woon; Paul White	3:12
9.	"Skin"	Woon	Woon; Dromgoole	3:01
10.	"Dedication"	Woon; Dan Gulino; See	Woon; Dromgoole	6:52

=== Note ===
- ^{^[a]} indicates an additional producer

== Personnel ==
Credits adapted from Tidal.

- Jamie Woon – vocals (all tracks), programming (tracks 1, 2, 4, 5), percussion (1, 9), acoustic guitar (3), electric guitar (6–8), saxophone (8)
- Alex Dromgoole – mixing (all tracks), programming (3, 6), mastering (5)
- Dan See – drums (all tracks), background vocals (8), percussion (9)
- Brian Gardner – mastering (1–4–10)
- Dan Gulino – bass guitar (1–3, 6, 7, 9, 10), fretless bass (8)
- Christian Gulino – piano (1, 9), keyboards (10)
- Mac McKenna – background vocals (1)
- Gwilym Gold – piano (1); bass guitar, keyboards (5, 6)
- Jonny Griffiths – baritone saxophone, tenor saxophone (2)
- Patrick Hayes – bass trombone, tenor horn (2)
- Barney Lowe – flugelhorn, trumpet (2)
- Oscar Golding – bass guitar (2)
- Royce Wood Junior – keyboards (2)
- Tom Swindell – percussion (3, 7)
- Robin Hannibal – programming (3)
- Willy Mason – additional vocals, guitar (4)
- Ryan Jacob – flugelhorn, trumpet (4)
- Mike Lesirge – tenor saxophone (4)
- James Adams – trombone (4)
- James Wood – piano, vocals (5); electric guitar (7), keyboards (10)
- Paul White – drums, programming, synthesizer (8)

== Charts ==
Chart performance for Making Time
Chart (2015)	Peak position
Belgian Albums (Ultratop Flanders)	52
Belgian Albums (Ultratop Wallonia)	136
Dutch Albums (Album Top 100)	51
UK Albums (OCC)	50
