= Young Rebel Set =

English indie rock band

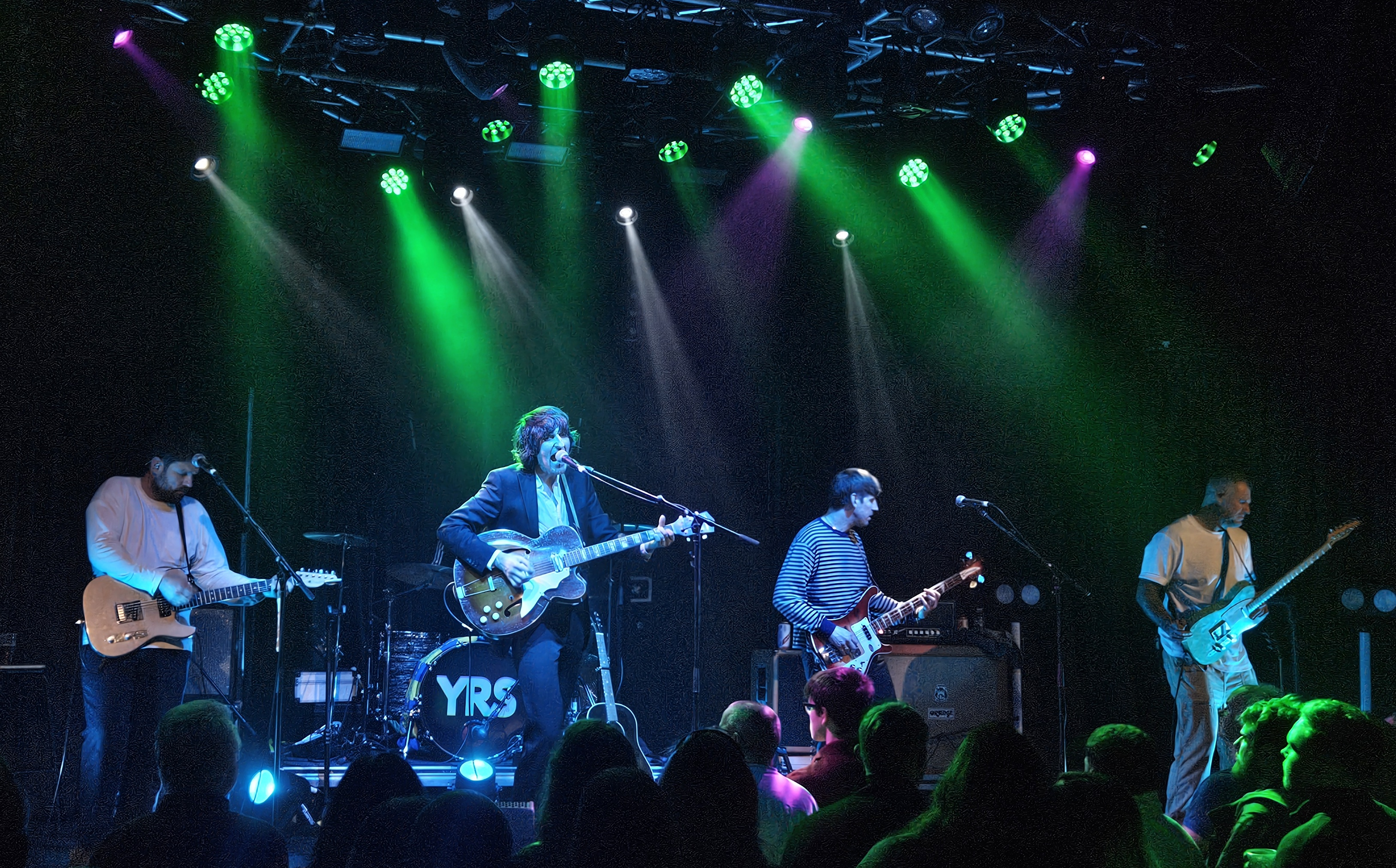
- Young Rebel Set at Stockton ARC in November 2025

Background information
- Origin: Stockton-on-Tees, England
- Genre: Indie rock
- Years active: 2007–2015, 2025–present
- Label: Ignition Records (2013)
- Members: Tom Blackwell; Andy Parmley; Chris Parmley; Luke Evans; Andy Bensley; Alfie Annable
- Past members: Matt Chipchase; Mark Evans
- Website: www.facebook.com/youngrebelset

Young Rebel Set are an English indie rock band formed in Stockton-on-Tees in 2007. The band originally consisted of Matthew Chipchase (vocals and acoustic guitar), Mark Evans (guitar, mandolin), Andrew Parmley (electric guitar), Chris Parmley (bass) and Luke Evans (drums and vocals). They have been classed as "life affirming graft rock" by the NME. They take inspiration from the likes of Bruce Springsteen, Johnny Cash, Dire Straits and The Pogues. After Chipchase died in 2019, the band reformed in 2025 with three new members.

== History ==
=== Formation and early years (2007–09) ===
The band met after an impromptu gig at Stockton KuBar and Young Rebel Set came to fruition in the winter of the same year. They signed to Ignition Records, home of music heavyweights Oasis on 11 February 2011 following several self-released singles. They toured the UK in 2008 and 2009, including slots supporting The Coral, The Pigeon Detectives, Cage The Elephant and The Courteeners.

=== Curse Our Love (2009–11) ===
In August 2009 they were championed by the NME as "the perfect antidote to cold careerist indie" in a two-page spread in the magazine's RADAR feature, shortly before the release of their debut single "If I Was". The second single "Walk On" followed in November. It received support on BBC Radio 1 via DJs Annie Mac and Huw Stephens. The band toured the UK, Germany, Switzerland, Austria, Belgium and the Netherlands in February and March 2010.

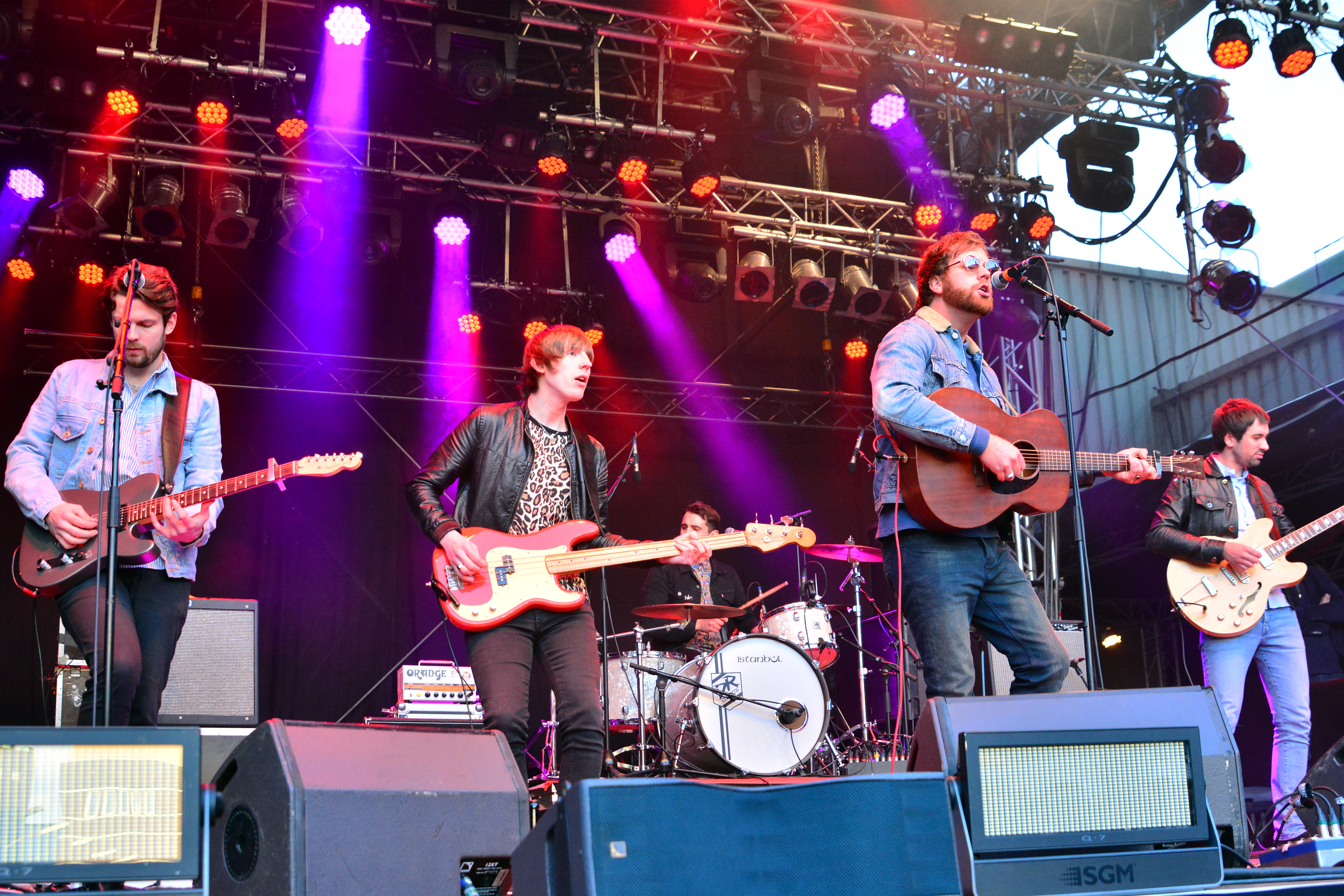
The band playing live in 2015

Their fourth release was the Won’t Get Up Again EP which was released in May 2010. "Measure of a Man" followed in October 2010 and featured This is England's Jo Hartly in the accompanying music video. Their debut album Curse Our Love was released by Ignition Records in the UK in April 2011 and by Independent record label Grand Hotel van Cleef in Germany in May 2011.

In May 2011 the band recorded an interview session with Dermot O'Leary for BBC Radio 2, followed by airplay of their single "Lion's Mouth" which succeeded the album release. During this time the band also recorded a live Maida Vale session for Steve Lamacq's 6music show. "Red Bricks", the final single taken from the album, was released in August 2011.

=== Crocodile (2013–14) ===
Crocodile, the band's second album, was recorded in Glasgow at Chem19 Studios with producer (and former Delgado's drummer) Paul Savage, best known for his work with Mogwai, The Phantom Band and Arab Strap, in early 2013. They spent most of the autumn/winter promoting the album in Germany, where it was released by Grand Hotel Van Cleef. They played a homecoming gig to more than 600 fans in The Crypt at Middlesbrough Town Hall in December 2013.

The first single taken from the album was "The Lash Of The Whip". Filmed in Germany, the video for the single was a take on the classic 90's British film 'Trainspotting' with the band members acting out the roles of the differing characters. The second single to be taken from the album was "Tuned Transmission", and was released in March 2014.

In 2015 the band announced via their Facebook page that they were taking a permanent hiatus.

=== Death of Matt Chipchase (December 2019) ===
In 2019, the band announced that they were reforming to play two shows at Middlesbrough Empire. However, on 2 December, the band announced the death of frontman Matt Chipchase on their Facebook page.

=== Reformation (2025) ===
In April 2025 the band announced that they were reforming and writing new music, as well as playing live dates in Germany and two shows in their hometown of Stockton-on-Tees later in autumn. The new line-up includes three original members in Andy Parmley, Chris Parmley and Luke Evans; they have been joined by Andy Bensley (guitar), Tom Blackwell (guitar and vocals), and Alfie Annable (keyboards).

== Discography ==
=== Studio albums ===
- Curse Our Love (2011)
- Crocodile (2013)

=== Extended plays ===
- Won't Get Up Again (2010)
- Sun (2025)

=== Singles ===
- "If I Was" (2009)
- "Walk On" (2009)
- "Measure of a Man" (2010)
- "Lion's Mouth" (2011)
- "Red Bricks" (2011)
- "The Lash of the Whip" (2013)
- "Tuned Transmission" (2014)
- "Anchorage" (2025)
- "Into the Night" (2025)
