= Night Air =

Single by Jamie Woon

from the album Mirrorwriting
- Released: 22 October 2010
- Recorded: The Way, River Recording; (London, England)
- Length: 5:23
- Label: Candent Songs; Polydor
- Songwriters: Jamie Woon; John O'Kane
- Producers: Jamie Woon; Burial

Jamie Woon singles chronology
"Wayfaring Stranger" (2007)	"Night Air" (2010)	"Lady Luck" (2011)

"Night Air" is a song by British singer Jamie Woon released as the lead single from his debut album, Mirrorwriting.

== Background ==
Woon described finishing the song as one of the highlights of the album-making process:

[...] I put the bass on Night Air, off this Casio keyboard my mate found in a skip. It just had this real gnarly, smooth, glidy bass. It was really nice to find a way of injecting weight into the tune without it being aggressive, that was exciting. That locked that track together. It was the first track where the mood and the sentiment fitted with the sound of the song, it was working as a whole.

== Critical reception ==
David Drake from Pitchfork noted the song for being "impeccably crafted", recreating the nocturnal elements, which render the listener a "lonely midnight victim of fever or desire". He added that the "powerful" track's "exotic sexuality" is highlighted by Woon's vocals and seduction. The Observer reviewer Kitty Empire called the track "otherworldly magic" and "dark". NME described it as "antsily infectious, scratchy and edgy".

== Formats and track listings ==
- EP
1. "Night Air" — 5:23
2. "Night Air" (Ramadanman Refix) — 7:11
3. "Night Air" (Becoming Real Remix) — 3:49
4. "Night Air" (Blue Daisy Mixture) — 6:49
- 12" vinyl
1. "Night Air" — 5:23
2. "Night Air" (Ramadanman Refix) — 7:11

== Credits and personnel ==
- Main vocals – Jamie Woon
- Design, artwork – Duncan Bellamy
- Drums, handclaps – Dan See
- Electric bass – Dan Gulino
- Mastered by – Stuart Hawkes
- Producer (additional) – Will Bevan
- Producer, mixed by, vocals, percussion (claps), programmed by – Jamie Woon
- Recorded by (drums and bass) – Dan Clarke
- Recorded by (vocals) – Austin Ince, Luke Buttery
- Recorded by (vocals, assisted by) – Tristan Hackney
- Vocals (choir) – Mae McKenna

== Charts ==
Chart (2010–11)	Peak Position
Belgium (Ultratop 50 Flanders)	15
Belgium (Ultratop 50 Wallonia)	29
Denmark (Tracklisten)	21
UK Indie (Official Charts)	5
UK Singles (Official Charts)	67

=== Year-end charts ===
Chart (2011)	Position
Belgian Singles Chart (Flanders)	87
