= Thees Uhlmann (album) =

Studio album by Thees Uhlmann
- Released: August 26, 2011
- Genre: Indie rock, rock, acoustic
- Label: Grand Hotel Van Cleef
- Producer: Tobias Kuhn

Thees Uhlmann chronology
Thees Uhlmann (2011)	#2 (2013)

Singles from Thees Uhlmann
- 1. "Zum Laichen und Sterben ziehen die Lachse den Fluss hinauf" Released: 11 Aug 2011; 2. "Und Jay-Z singt uns ein Lied" Released: 4 Nov 2011

Professional ratings
Review scores
Source	Rating
Eclat-Mag	3/5 stars
Laut	4/5 stars
Plattentests	7/10

Thees Uhlmann is the debut record for former Tomte frontman Thees Uhlmann released through Uhlmann's own Grand Hotel van Cleef label on August 26, 2011. The record was commercially well-received, charting within the Top 5 in Germany and the Top 20 in Austria. The album did not chart in Switzerland. The album consists mostly of sentimental narratives composed on an acoustic guitar. The music was influenced by American rock-singer Bruce Springsteen. German rapper Casper features on & Jay-Z singt uns ein Lied and received credit for writing his own verse. Otherwise, all lyrics, which were written by Uhlmann, describe a search for stability and a place to call home. After the album's release, Uhlmann, a native of Hemmoor, left Berlin and moved back to a more rural environment. This frustration is highlighted throughout the record.

== Track listing ==
All music is composed by Uhlmann and Tobias Kuhn.

No.	Title	Length
1.	"Zum Laichen und Sterben ziehen die Lachse den Fluss hinauf"	3:40
2.	"Die Nacht war kurz (Ich stehe früh auf)"	3:43
3.	"& Jay-Z singt uns ein Lied" (featuring Casper)	4:57
4.	"17 Worte"	3:46
5.	"Die Toten auf dem Rücksitz"	4:03
6.	"Sommer in der Stadt"	4:07
7.	"Römer am Ende Roms"	4:52
8.	"Das Mädchen von Kasse 2"	4:22
9.	"Lat: 53.7 Lon: 9.11667"	3:07
10.	"Paris im Herbst"	4:08
11.	"Vom Delta bis zur Quelle"	4:32

== Formats ==
- Standard Edition on CD and vinyl
- Special Edition
- Fan Edition

== Chart history ==
Chart (2011)	Peak position
Austrian Albums Chart	16
German Albums Chart	4
