= D'accord =

Studio album by Fjørt
- Released: March 21, 2014
- Studios: SU2-Studio, Illingen, Saarland
- Genres: Post-hardcore, screamo, post-rock
- Length: 36:08
- Language: German
- Label: This Charming Man
- Producer: Phil Hillen

Fjørt chronology
Demontage (2012)	D'accord (2014)	Kontakt (2016)

Professional ratings
Review scores
Source	Rating
Heavy Pop	8/10 stars
Fuze Magazine	favourable
Metal.de	9/10 stars
Plattentests.de	7/10 stars

D'accord (French pronunciation: [d‿a.kɔʁ]) is German post-hardcore band Fjørt's debut full-length studio album, released on 21 March 2014 by This Charming Man Records.

== Track listing ==
All music is composed by Fjørt.

No.	Title	Length
1.	"D'accord" ("Agreed")	4:56
2.	"Schnaiserkitt" (play on "Kaiserschnitt" – "Caesarean Section")	3:51
3.	"Valhalla"	3:56
4.	"Von Welt" ("Of the World")	3:43
5.	"Hallo Zukunft" ("Hello Future")	3:48
6.	"Für Elise" ("For Elise")	2:52
7.	"Gescholten" ("Scolded")	2:25
8.	"Fauxpas" ("Misstep")	4:06
9.	"Atoll"	2:45
10.	"Passepartout" ("Skeleton Key")	3:46
Total length:		36:08

== Personnel ==
Fjørt

- Chris Hell – vocals, guitar
- David Frings – bass, vocals
- Frank Schophaus – drums
