= Fjørt =

German post-hardcore band

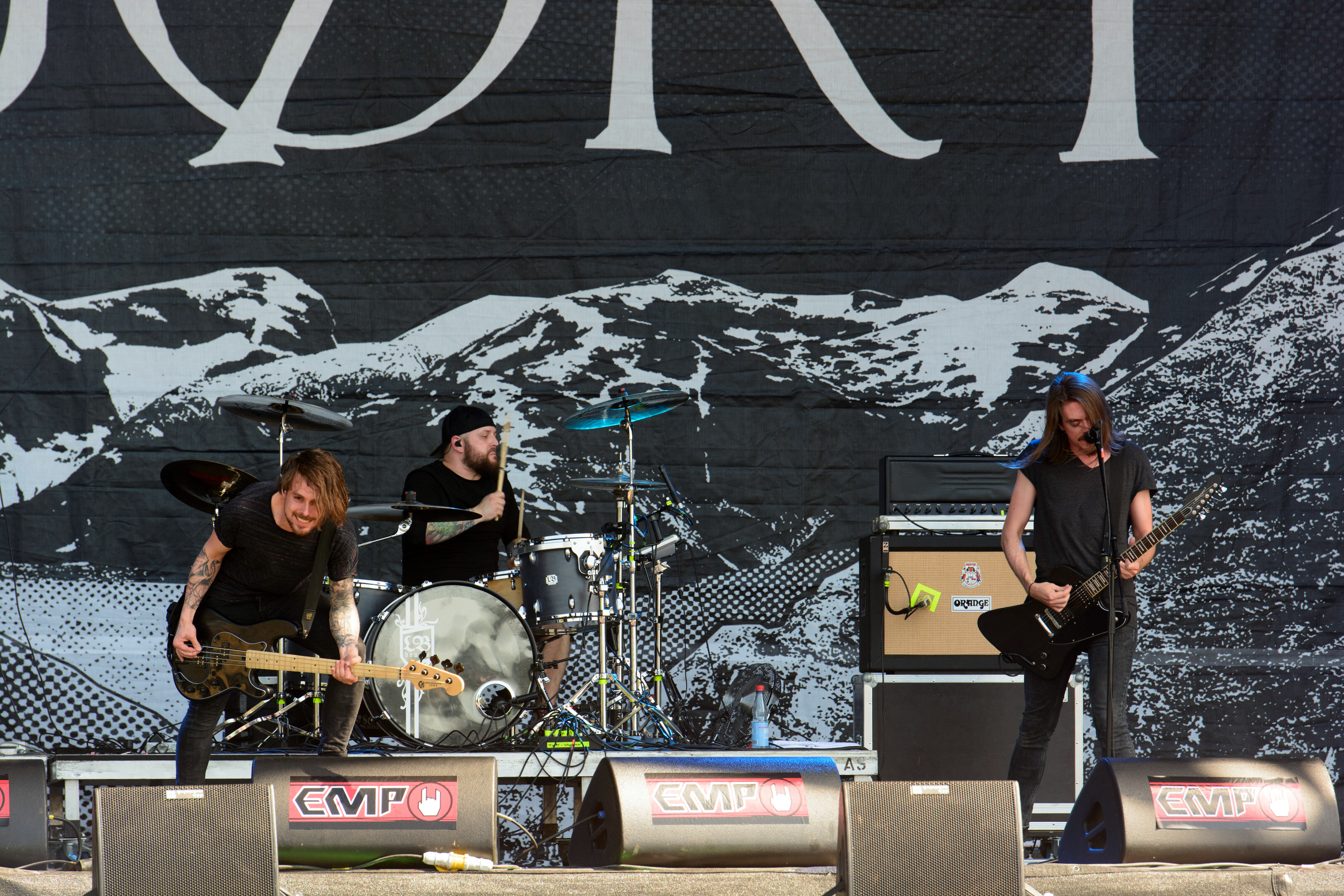

Background information
- Origin: Aachen, North Rhine-Westphalia, Germany
- Genres: Post-hardcore; screamo; post-rock
- Years active: 2012–present
- Labels: This Charming Man; Grand Hotel van Cleef
- Members: Chris Hell; David Frings; Frank Schophaus
- Website: fjort.de

Fjørt (stylised as FJØRT) are a German post-hardcore band from Aachen, formed in February 2012. They have released four studio albums and one EP, and are currently signed to the record label Grand Hotel van Cleef.

== History ==
On 23 November 2012, the band released their first EP, Demontage, on Truelove Entertainment. Although it only consisted of six tracks, two music videos – for Glasgesicht and the title track Demontage – had also been released. During the time leading up to the release of the band's debut full-length album, Fjørt had played around 150 shows. Then, on 21 March 2014, D'accord was released on This Charming Man Records.

2015 saw the band take a step towards signing to a larger label, Grand Hotel van Cleef, through which they released their second album Kontakt on 22 January 2016. In the subsequent months the band embarked upon their first headline tour of Germany, Austria and Switzerland alongside We Never Learned to Live.

== Band members ==
Band members during reload festival 2016

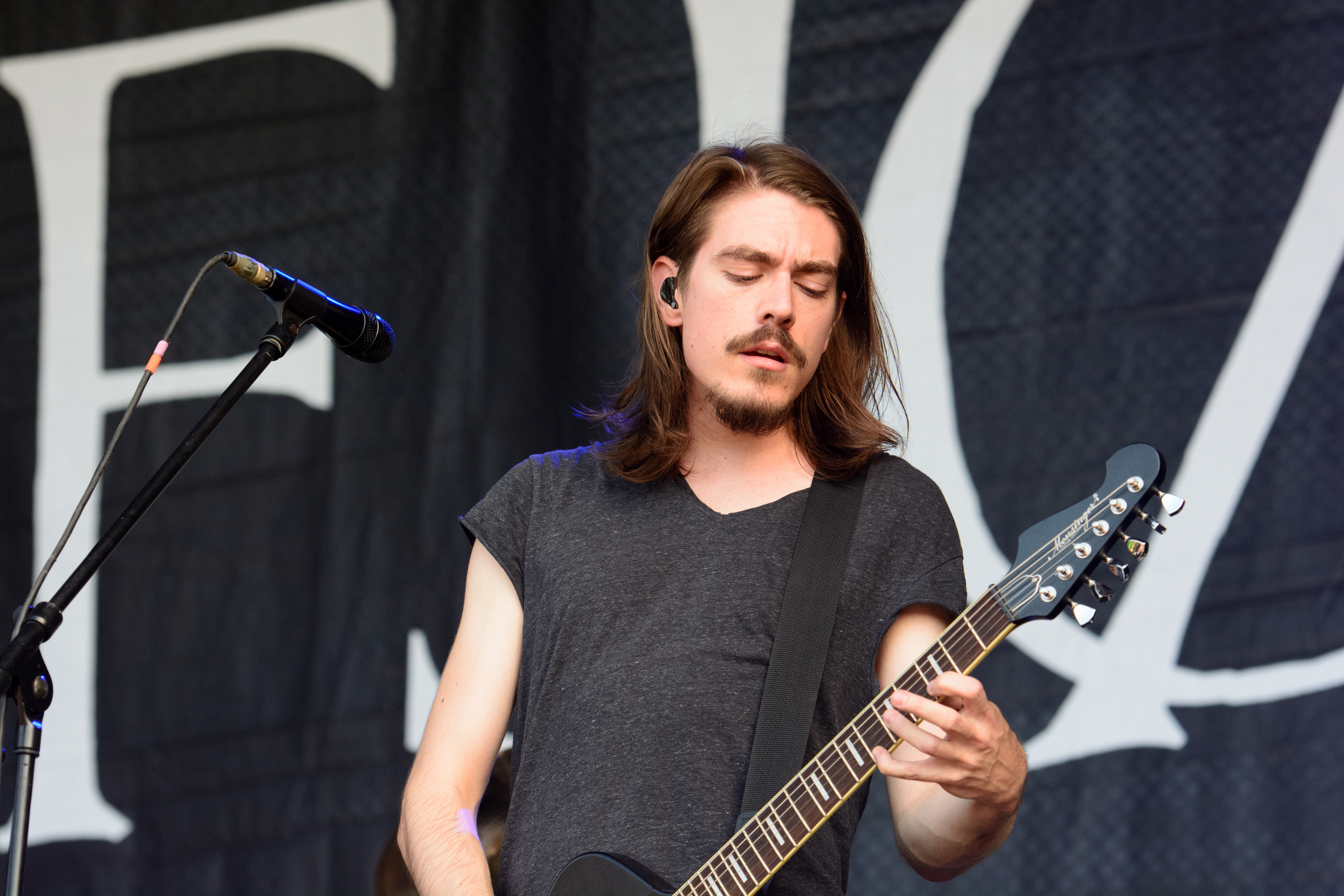
Chris Hell

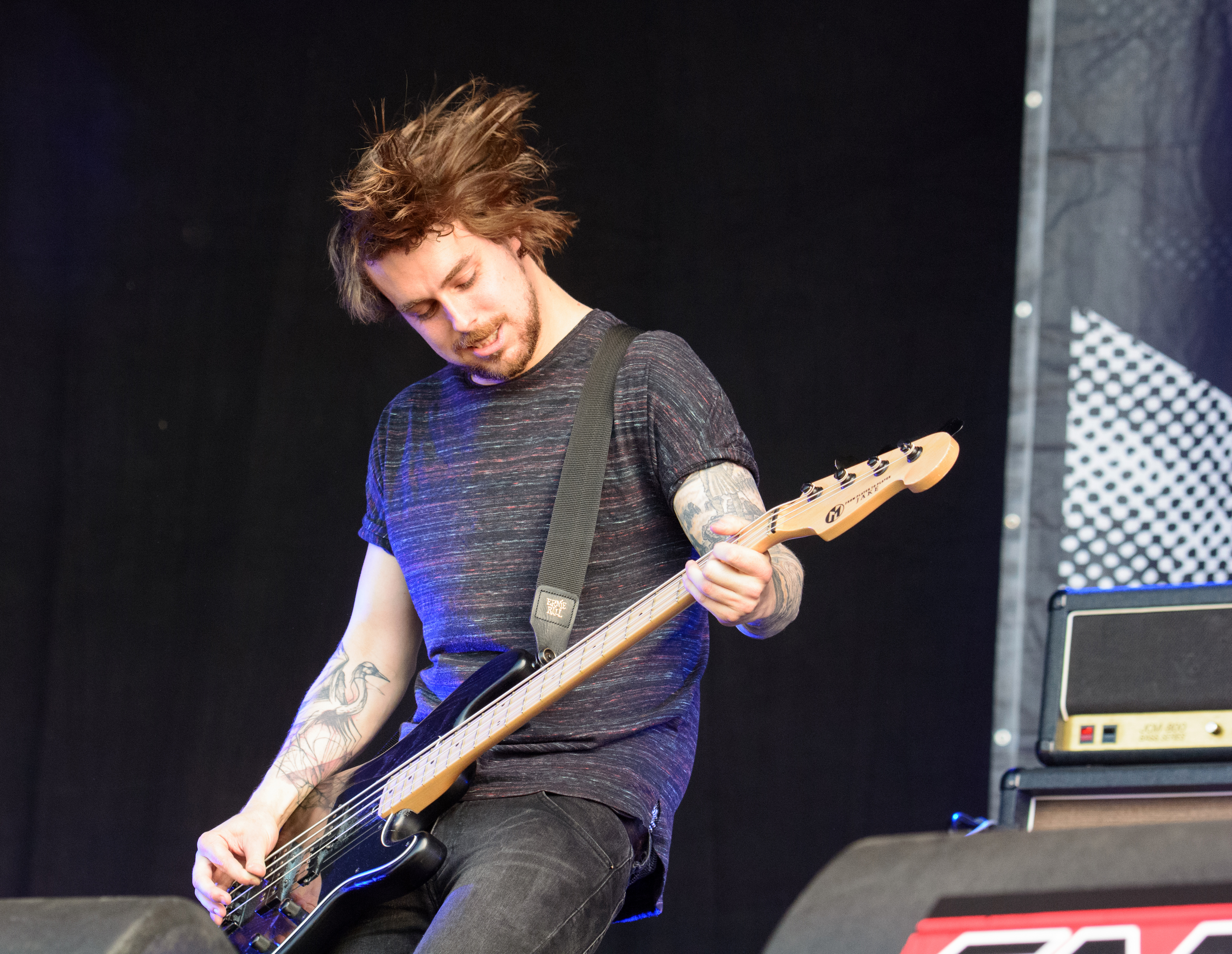
David Frings

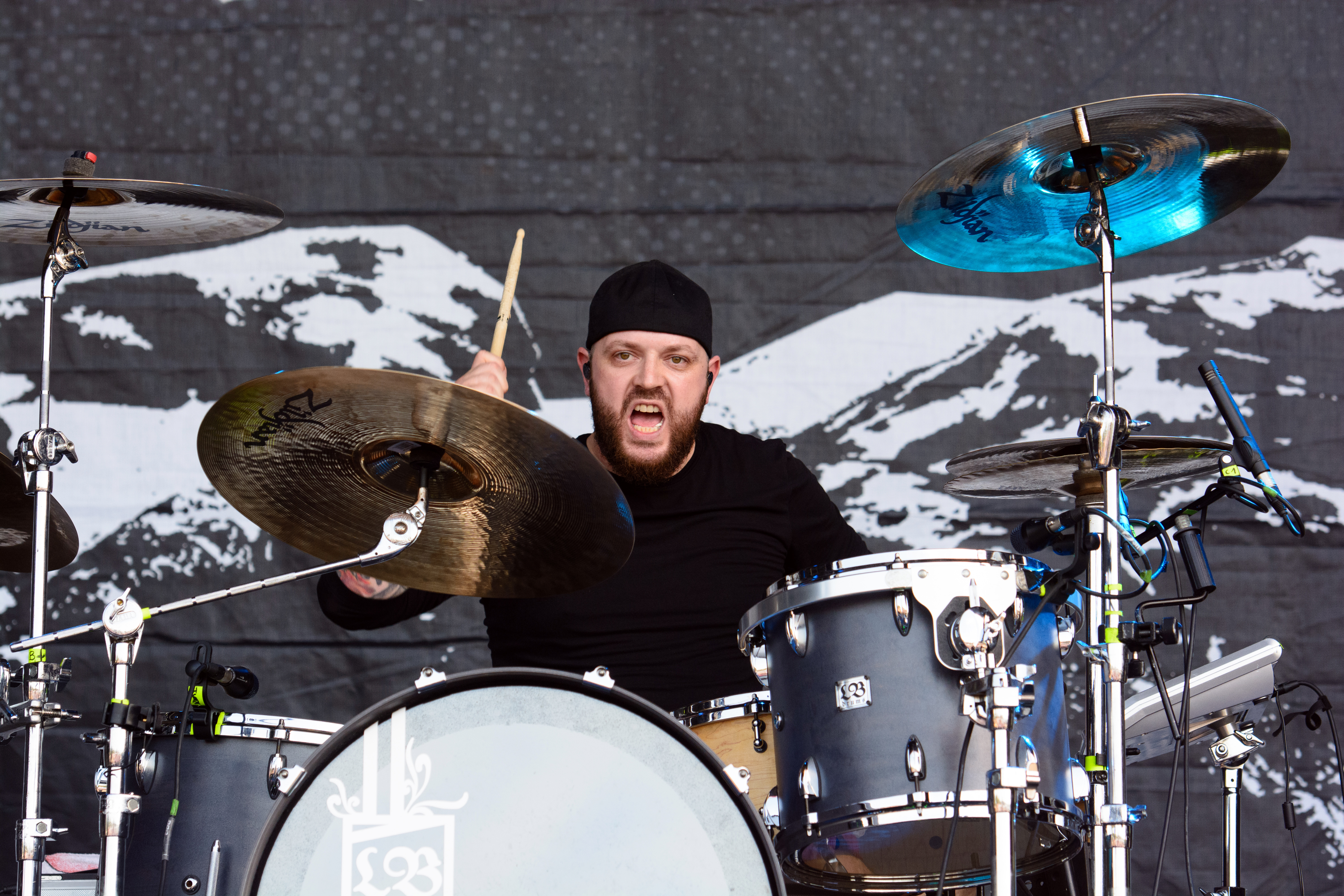
Frank Schophaus

== Discography ==
Studio albums

- D'accord (2014)
- Kontakt (2016)
- Couleur (2017)
- Nichts (2022)
- Belle Époque (2026)

EPs

- Demontage (2012)
