= Marcus Wiebusch =

German musician and lyricist

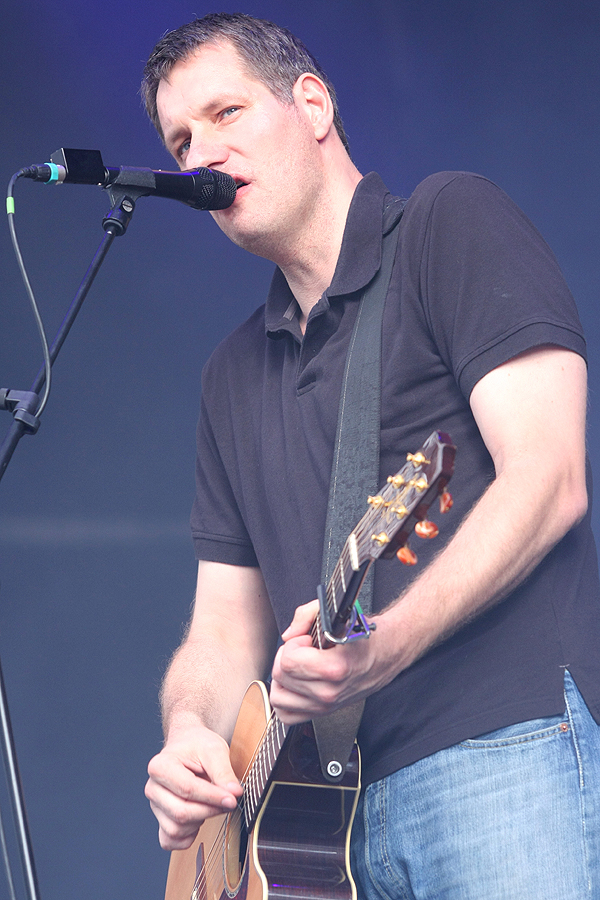

Background information
- Origin: Hamburg, Germany
- Genres: punk rock anarcho-punk pop rock (later)
- Years active: 1992–present
- Labels: Weird System; B.A. Records
- Member of: Kettcar
- Formerly of: Rantanplan

Marcus Wiebusch is a German musician and lyricist.

From 1992 to 1999 he played in the political punk band ...But Alive, for which he sang, played guitar, and wrote lyrics. He also had two even more aggressive and politically charged, but less prolific and recognized side-projects, the bands Die vom Himmel fielen and Utell A Lie, his only ever English-speaking project. During this time he established an independent record label called "B.A. Records" to put out his music and also to produce other bands like Tomte.

In 1994, while still playing with ...But Alive, he released his first solo album, Hippiekacke, which did not really satisfy him.

After breaking up all three groups he played in the ska band Rantanplan and still plays in the rock band Kettcar. To publish Kettcar's records he merged "B.A." with Tomte-singer Thees Uhlmann's "Hotel van Cleef" to form record label Grand Hotel van Cleef which he is co-owner and managing director of to this day. The label has evolved into one of the most influential, most popular independent labels in Germany, with many more bands having signed on since.

In 2004 Wiebusch and Uhlmann were approached to take part in a movie project, No Songs of Love, which entailed the formation of a band with actor Jürgen Vogel as singer. Wiebusch and Uhlmann agreed and wrote ten songs (based on the fictional biography of Vogel's character) for this band, Hansen, played guitar and sang background during the album's recordings and a tour during which filming took place and acted in the movie. No Songs of Love and Hansen's album were released simultaneously in 2005.

In 2014 Wiebusch released his second solo album, Konfetti.
