= Kettcar =

German Indie rock band

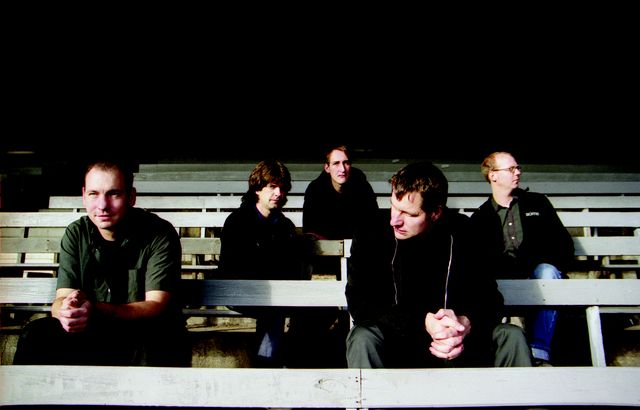

Background information
- Origin: Hamburg, Germany
- Genres: Indie pop, indie rock
- Years active: 2001–2013; 2017–present
- Label: Grand Hotel van Cleef
- Members: Marcus Wiebusch; Reimer Bustorff; Erik Langer; Christian Hake; Lars Wiebusch
- Past members: Frank Tirado-Rosales
- Website: www.kettcar.net

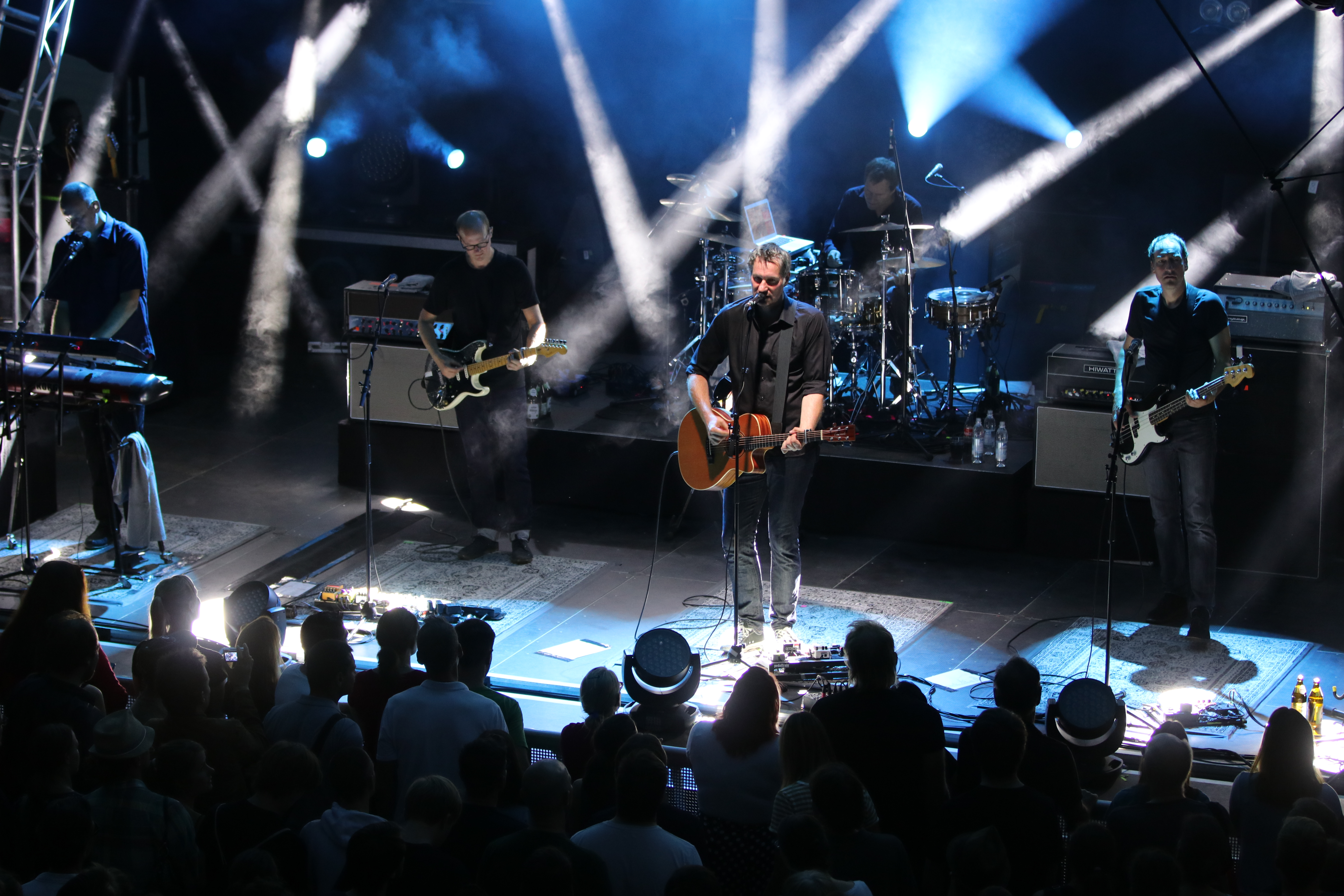
Kettcar, 2018

Kettcar is an indie rock music band based in Hamburg, Germany. The band has released five studio albums so far. The band released their fourth album, Zwischen den Runden, in 2012. Their fifth album, Ich vs. Wir, was released in October 2017. The band name is derived from the Kettcar, a riding toy produced by Kettler since 1962.

== History ==
In 2001, Marcus Wiebusch of ...But Alive and bass player Reimer Bustorff, who were both members of the ska band Rantanplan, decided to break away from punk's and ska's traditions of aggressive, political lyrics in favor of developing a more emotional, laid-back style. Together with Erik Langer (guitar), Frank Tirado-Rosales (percussion, also a former member of ...But Alive) and Marcus' brother Lars Wiebusch (keyboard), they formed Kettcar to experiment with a different sound and address more personal issues in their lyrics.

When they failed to find a label for the release of their first album, Du und wieviel von deinen Freunden ("You and how many of your friends", a quote from the 1985 movie The Breakfast Club), Wiebusch and Bustorff banded together with Tomte frontman Thees Uhlmann and formed the independent music label Grand Hotel van Cleef. In early 2002, Du und... became the first record to be released via the new label. Its success, while still moderate, exceeded expectations by far and Kettcar became darlings of the German music press. In March 2005, Kettcar released their second album, Von Spatzen und Tauben, Dächern und Händen ("Of sparrows and pigeons, rooftops and hands"), which peaked at number 5 of the German album charts and is sometimes seen as their final breakthrough. The album title is a play on a German proverb, English equivalent of which would be "A bird in the hand is worth two in the bush".

Kettcar's third album, Sylt (named after the German island in the North Sea), was released in April 2008 and debuted at number 5 of the German album charts. In August 2008, Kettcar played an acoustic concert at the club Kampnagel, supported by a string quartet. In November 2009, Kettcar continued this program and played six concerts with the orchestra Neue Philharmonie Frankfurt supporting them. A recording of the concert in the theatre Fliegende Bauten was released in January 2010 on the eponymous live album. In June 2010, Frank Tirado-Rosales announced that he was leaving the band in order to pursue other projects. His successor is Christian Hake, who was already a drummer for the band Home of the Lame and the artist Olli Schulz. On 10 February 2012, the band released their fourth studio album, Zwischen den Runden ("Between rounds").

The band went on hiatus from April 2013 until July 2017. In August 2017, the band released their first single in five years, "Sommer '89 (Er schnitt Löcher in den Zaun)". The song describes an escape from the GDR and is understood as a statement regarding the European migrant crisis. Their fifth album, Ich vs. Wir, was slated for release on 13 October 2017.

== Musical style ==
Kettcar's musical style is usually classified as indie rock or indie pop. The band is also often associated with the musical current Hamburger Schule. Marcus Wiebusch himself does not consider the band to be part of the current, stating that Hamburg is their personal origin only. Reimer Bustorff simply called their style guitar pop. Their newer albums, especially Zwischen den Runden, added strings, winds and pianos to the instruments used.

== Discography ==
Kettcar discography
- Studio albums: 5
- Live albums: 1
- Singles: 10
- Music videos: 10

=== Studio albums ===
Year	Album details	Chart peaks		
Year	Album details	GER	AUT	CH
2002	Du und wie viel von deinen Freunden: Released: 28 October 2002; Label: Grand Hotel van Cleef; Format: CD, vinyl	—	—	—
2005	Von Spatzen und Tauben, Dächern und Händen: Released: 7 March 2005; Label: Grand Hotel van Cleef; Format: CD, vinyl	5	49	—
2008	Sylt: Released: 28 April 2008; Label: Grand Hotel van Cleef; Format: CD, vinyl	5	12	78
2012	Zwischen den Runden: Released: 12 February 2012; Label: Grand Hotel van Cleef; Format: CD, vinyl	5	15	40
2017	Ich vs. Wir: Released: 13 October 2017; Label: Grand Hotel van Cleef; Format: CD, vinyl	4	11	27
2024	Gute Laune ungerecht verteilt: Released: 5 April 2024; Label: Grand Hotel van Cleef; Format: CD, Vinyl	1	17	28
"—" denotes a release that did not chart.

=== Live albums ===
Year	Album details	Chart peaks
Year	Album details	GER
2010	Fliegende Bauten: Released: 22 January 2010; Label: Grand Hotel van Cleef; Format: CD, Vinyl	32

=== Singles ===
Year	Title	Album	chart peaks
Year	Title	Album	GER
2003	"Landungsbrücken raus": Released: 10 February 2003	Du und wie viel von deinen Freunden	–
2005	"48 Stunden": Released: 14 February 2005	Von Spatzen und Tauben, Dächern und Händen	45
2005	"Deiche": Released: 9 May 2005	Von Spatzen und Tauben, Dächern und Händen	69
2005	"Balu": Released: 12 September 2005	Von Spatzen und Tauben, Dächern und Händen	–
2008	"Graceland": Released: 28 March 2008	Sylt	57
2008	"Nullsummenspiel": Released: 30 May 2008	Sylt	–
2008	"Am Tisch": Released: 29 August 2008	Sylt	–
2010	"Money Left to Burn" (live): Released: 8 January 2010	Fliegende Bauten	–
2012	"Im Club": Released: 3 February 2012	Zwischen den Runden	–
2017	"Sommer '89 (Er schnitt Löcher in den Zaun)": Released: 11 August 2017	Ich vs. Wir	–
