= Curse Our Love =

Studio album by Young Rebel Set
- Released: 25 April 2011
- Genre: Alternative rock
- Length: 40:55
- Label: Big Flame
- Producer: Patrick Jordan

Young Rebel Set chronology
Won't Get Up Again (2010)	Curse Our Love (2011)	Crocodile (2013)

Professional ratings
Aggregate scores
Source	Rating
Metacritic	32/100
Review scores
Source	Rating
Classic Rock	2.5/5 stars
DIY	4.5/5 stars
Drowned in Sound	1/10
NME	5/10
Uncut	1/5 stars

Curse Our Love is the debut album by alternative rock band Young Rebel Set. It was released in April 2011 under Big Flame Records.

== Track list ==
No.	Title	Length
1.	"Lion's Mouth"	4:06
2.	"Walk On"	3:22
3.	"If I Was"	4:06
4.	"Won't Get Up Again"	3:41
5.	"Borders"	3:24
6.	"Red Bricks"	3:39
7.	"Measure of a Man"	3:03
8.	"Bagatelle"	5:07
9.	"Fall Hard"	3:44
10.	"Precious Days"	3:36
11.	"Billy Died"	3:07

== Charts ==
Chart	Peak position
German Albums (Offizielle Top 100)	83
