= Kill the Kilians =

Studio album by Kilians
- Released: 7 September 2007
- Recorded: 2006–2007
- Genre: Indie rock Garage rock
- Length: 42:55
- Label: Vertigo/Universal
- Producer: Swen Meyer

Kilians chronology
Kill the Kilians (2007)	They Are Calling Your Name (2009)

Kill the Kilians is the debut album by German indie rock band Kilians, first released in September 2007.

== Track listing ==
1. "Short Life of Margott " – 3:04
2. "Fight the Start " – 3:01
3. "Enforce Yourself " – 3:07
4. "Little Billie, Little Brother " – 3:48
5. "Can't Get Along " – 4:25
6. "When Will I Ever Get Home" – 3:36
7. "Sunday " – 3:00
8. "Fool to Fool " – 3:28
9. "Jealous Lover " – 2:36
10. "Something to Arrive " – 2:47
11. "Inside Outside " – 3:44
12. "Dizzy " – 3:24
13. "P.L.E.A.S.U.R.E. " – 3:02

== See also ==
- 2007 in music
