= Grand Hotel van Cleef =

German independent record label

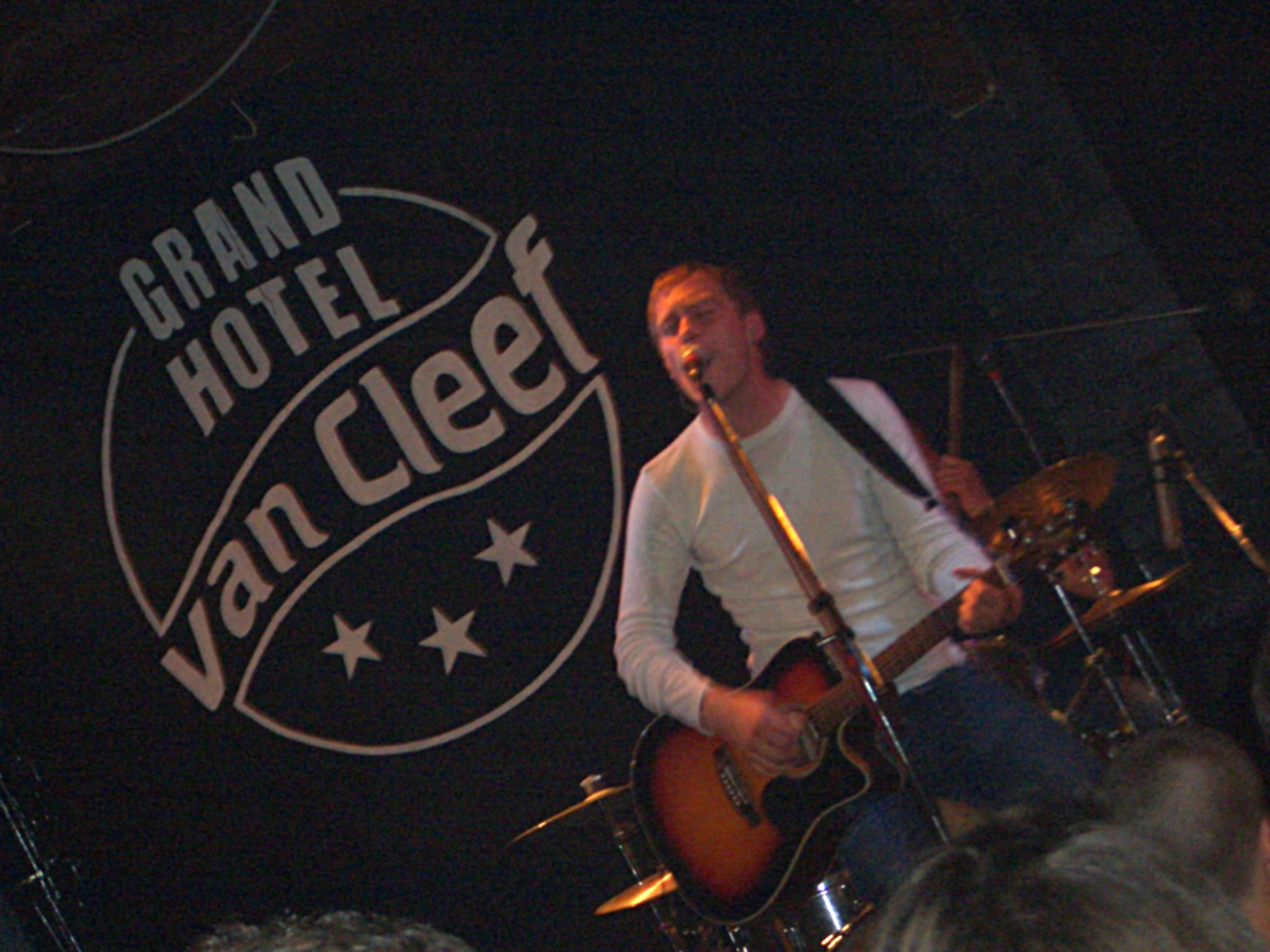
Thees Uhlmann performing in front of the Grand Hotel van Cleef logo.

Grand Hotel van Cleef is an independent record label headquartered in Hamburg, Germany.

== Label history ==
Grand Hotel van Cleef was founded in September 2002 by the musicians Thees Uhlmann, Marcus Wiebusch and Reimer Bustorff. The newly formed band of Bustorff and Wiebusch Kettcar had recently recorded their first album, Du und wie viel von deinen Freunden, (engl.: You and how many of your friends) but they found no label to release it. In addition, it was clear that Uhlmann's band Tomte would release their third album Hinter all diesen Fenstern (engl.: Behind all these windows). The big fan base even before the publication was ultimately the deciding factor to start the label. The name originated from a joke: On Thees Uhlmann's question on how to call the label, Tomte's ex-drummer Timo Bodenstein said "Hotel van Cleef" - he was working in the restaurant business, and it should be called something with gastronomy. So they decided to call Tomte's label Hotel van Cleef. Due to the merger with Marcus Wiebusch's B.A. Records, it was renamed to Grand Hotel van Cleef. In 2004 the musicians Thees Uhlmann, Marcus Wiebusch, Felix Gebhard and Max Schroeder, who were all signed to Grand Hotel Van Cleef, wrote the soundtrack for the film No Songs of Love, Hansen Band. Actor Jürgen Vogel contributed in the songwriting. The label's biggest chart success was the publication of Buchstaben über der Stadt by Tomte and Thees Uhlmann's solo debut album, both on fourth place. and the publications Von Spatzen und Tauben, Dächern und Händen and Sylt by the band Kettcar, each of which reached the fifth place. This success was topped by Kettcar's latest Release Ich vs. Wir (engl.: Me versus Us) that could reach the fourth place in the German music chart. Hansen Band and Young Rebel Set, Kilians and Fjørt also released albums that could enter the German music chart.

After releasing their own records, Grand Hotel began signing and producing other indie music acts, and have built a reputation as the most important label for alternative German guitar pop. Notable albums include that by the fictional Hansen Band, a band invented by movie maker Lars Kraume for his 2005 movie No Songs of Love (Uhlmann and Wiebusch trained actor Jürgen Vogel on how to adopt the proper rock pose).

== Fest van Cleef ==
Since 2006, the Grand Hotel van Cleef also organizes its own open air festival, "Fest van Cleef." This concert takes place on three days in three different cities each year.

- August 2006, in Hannover, Trier and Bonn: Tomte, Kettcar, The Weakerthans, Olli Schulz und der Hund Marie, Pale, Home of the Lame
- July 2007, in Potsdam, Bremen and Karlsruhe: Kettcar, Kante, Bernd Begemann, Maritime, Hansen Band, Kilians
- July 2008, in Mannheim, Köln and Großefehn: Kettcar, Tomte, Robocop Kraus, I Am Kloot, Niels Frevert, Ghost of Tom Joad
- July 2009, in Northeim, Freiburg and Essen: Element of Crime, Tomte, Why?, Muff Potter, Kilians, Gisbert zu Knyphausen
- December 2010, in Bielefeld, Berlin and Mainz: Kettcar, Thees Uhlmann, Tim Neuhaus, Gisbert zu Knyphausen, An Horse, Beat! Beat! Beat!, Nils Koppruch, Young Rebel Set
- December 2011, in Bielefeld, Trier and Dresden: Element Of Crime, Thees Uhlmann, Casper, Frank Turner, Ghost of Tom Joad, ClickClickDecker, Moritz Krämer, Maike Rosa Vogel
- August 2017, in Hamburg at mehr! Theater am Großmarkt: Kettcar, Thees Uhlmann & Band, Fortuna Ehrenfeld, Gisbert zu Knyphausen

== Artists ==
- Adam Angst
- Amos the Kid
- An Horse
- Bernd Begemann & die Befreiung
- The Deadnotes
- Der Hund Marie
- Der Herr Polaris
- Dorit Jakobs
- East Cameron Folkcore
- Escapado
- Fjørt
- Hansen Band
- Home of the Lame
- Imaginary Cities
- John K. Samson
- Kettcar
- Lirr
- Maritime
- Marr
- Ola Podrida
- Pale
- Propagandhi
- Tim Neuhaus
- Tomte (band)
- Torpus & The Art Directors
- Young Rebel Set

== Former artists ==
- Olli Schulz & der Hund Marie (moved to Audiolith Records, subsequently EMI, now inactive)
- Death Cab for Cutie (now: Atlantic Records)
