= Mayhem! (comics) =

- Cover of the first issue

Publication information
- Publisher: Image Comics
- Schedule: Monthly
- Format: Limited series
- Genre: Superhero
- Publication date: October 2009
- No. of issues: 3

Creative team
- Created by: Tyrese Gibson; Mike Le; Will Wilson; Tone Rodriguez
- Written by: Tyrese Gibson; Mike Le; Will Wilson
- Artist: Tone Rodriguez

Tyrese Gibson's Mayhem! is an American three-issue mini-series by Tyrese Gibson, Mike Le, Will Wilson, and Tone Rodriguez. The series was published through Image Comics and the first issue released on August 5, 2009. Of the series, Gibson stated that he was inspired to create the series after being a guest at a 2009 Comic-Con.

== Synopsis ==
The series follows Dante, a masked vigilante whose dark and mysterious past compels him to take back the city of Los Angeles from the criminal underworld. He is helped in this task by his assistant Malice as they go up against the crime lord Big X.

== Reception ==
IGN gave it a rating of 4.9 out of 10, calling it "a very mediocre comic" and criticizing the artwork as "bland".

== Marketing ==
Gibson's marketing for the series was criticized by its then marketing director Percy Carey, over the usage of social media to promote the comic. Carey resigned as the comic's marketing director over what he saw as "snake-oil tactics", as well as tweets concerning Brian Hibbs. Hibbs, a staff writer for Comic Book Resources, was harassed by fans after posting several comments in a ComicsBeat post where he questioned the likelihood of the comic selling more than a few issues at any given comic book store. Gibson had requested that fans demand that retailers order 400 copies and later asked his fans to call Hibbs and demand that he order the book for them. Hibbs commented that while he did sell multiple copies of the comic, he viewed the tactic as "shotgun marketing" that would not establish future sales for either the store or the Mayhem! series.
