= Juwel =

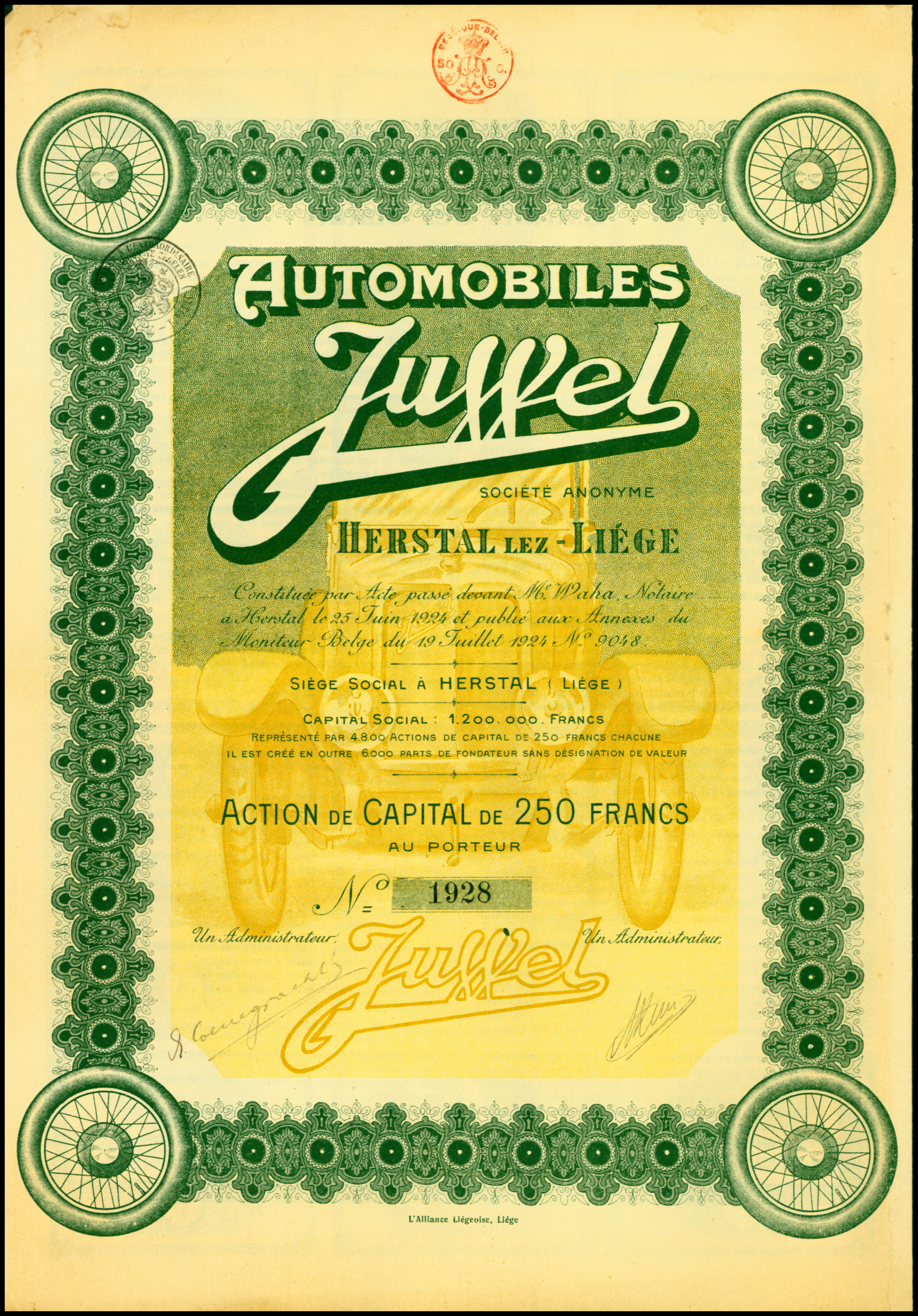
Share of the Automobiles Juwel S.A., issued 19. July 1924

The Juwel was a Belgian automobile manufactured from 1923 until 1927 in Waremme by Société des Automobiles Juwel. Initial plans called for a mass-produced 1100 cc four cylinder tourer and two models were shown at the 1922 Brussels Motor Show. Bodies offered included open 2 and 4 seat cars, a 3 seat sports cars, two door saloon and a light delivery van. Financial problems restricted the numbers made. A new range of cars were shown in 1924 now with overhead valve engines and front wheel brakes but production remained limited.

The company was reformed in 1927 as Usines Juwel in Herstal and a front wheel drive sports car, the TA-4 sold under the Astra marque, was produced with 1131 cc engine. The drive system was based on the one used in the French Tracta. The company closed in 1928.
