= Mirrorwriting =

Studio album by Jamie Woon
- Released: 18 April 2011
- Studio: The Way, River Recording (London, England)
- Length: 45:51
- Label: Candent Songs; Polydor
- Producer: Jamie Woon; Will Bevan; Royce Wood, Jr.; Luke Buttery

Jamie Woon chronology
Mirrorwriting (2011)	Making Time (2015)

Singles from Mirrorwriting
- 1. "Night Air" Released: 22 October 2010; 2. "Lady Luck" Released: 21 February 2011

Mirrorwriting is the debut studio album by British singer Jamie Woon. It was released in Europe on 18 April 2011 through Polydor Records. The album started to receive hype after Woon ended fourth on BBC's Sound of 2011 poll. It was preceded by the lead single, "Night Air" on 22 October 2010.

== Critical reception ==
Paul Clarke of BBC Music gave the album a positive review by saying: "Things would probably be quite different for Woon had he'd got his act together sooner. In 2007, his fragile cover of an old folk spiritual placed him pretty much alone at the crossroads between rural blues and urban electronica, a 20-something Robert Johnson from London who'd sold his soul to dubstep instead of the Devil. Today, though, he shares this space with The xx and James Blake; and overshadowed by The xx's Mercury Prize victory and Blake's own debut album of earlier in 2011, Woon's music could now be in danger of sounding wearily familiar rather than darkly mysterious".

Professional ratings
Review scores
Source	Rating
BBC Music	(positive)
The Daily Telegraph	4/5 stars
The Guardian	2/5 stars
The Independent	(favourable)
Loud and Quiet	(6/10)
Pitchfork	(8.0/10)
musicOMH	4/5 stars
The Observer	3/5 stars
Virgin Music	(7/10)

== Commercial performance ==
As of January 2012 UK sales stand at 30,000 copies according to The Guardian.

== Track listing ==
No.	Title	Writer(s)	Producer(s)	Length
1.	"Night Air"	Jamie Woon; John O'Kane	Jamie Woon; Will Bevan	5:22
2.	"Street"	Woon; O'Kane	Jamie Woon; Will Bevan	3:10
3.	"Lady Luck"	Woon; Nemo Jones	Jamie Woon; Will Bevan; Royce Wood, Jr.	4:08
4.	"Shoulda"	Woon; O'Kane; Steven Camden	Jamie Woon; Royce Wood, Jr.	3:49
5.	"Middle"	Woon; James Wood	Jamie Woon; Royce Wood, Jr.	4:38
6.	"Spirits"	Woon; Brian Barry	Jamie Woon; Royce Wood, Jr.	3:47
7.	"Echoes"	Woon; Camden	Jamie Woon	2:17
8.	"Spiral"	Woon	Jamie Woon; Luke Buttery	5:25
9.	"TMRW"	Woon; O'Kane	Jamie Woon; Royce Wood, Jr.	3:30
10.	"Secondbreath"	Woon	Jamie Woon	0:47
11.	"Gravity"	Woon	Jamie Woon	5:07
12.	"Waterfront"	Woon	Jamie Woon	3:51

iTunes bonus tracks
No.	Title	Writer(s)	Length
13.	"Missing Person" (Recorded as part of promotion in the Linbury Studio Theatre at the Royal Opera House)	Woon	3:55
14.	"Spirits" (YouTube Version)	Woon; Barry	5:54

== Charts ==
Chart (2011)	Peak position
Belgian Albums Chart (Flanders)	9
Belgian Albums Chart (Wallonia)	29
Danish Albums Chart	17
Dutch Albums Chart	38
Norwegian Albums Chart	14
Swiss Albums Chart	50
UK Albums Chart	15

=== Year-end charts ===
Chart (2011)	Position
Belgian Albums Chart (Flanders)	55
