= Jamie Woon =

English musician

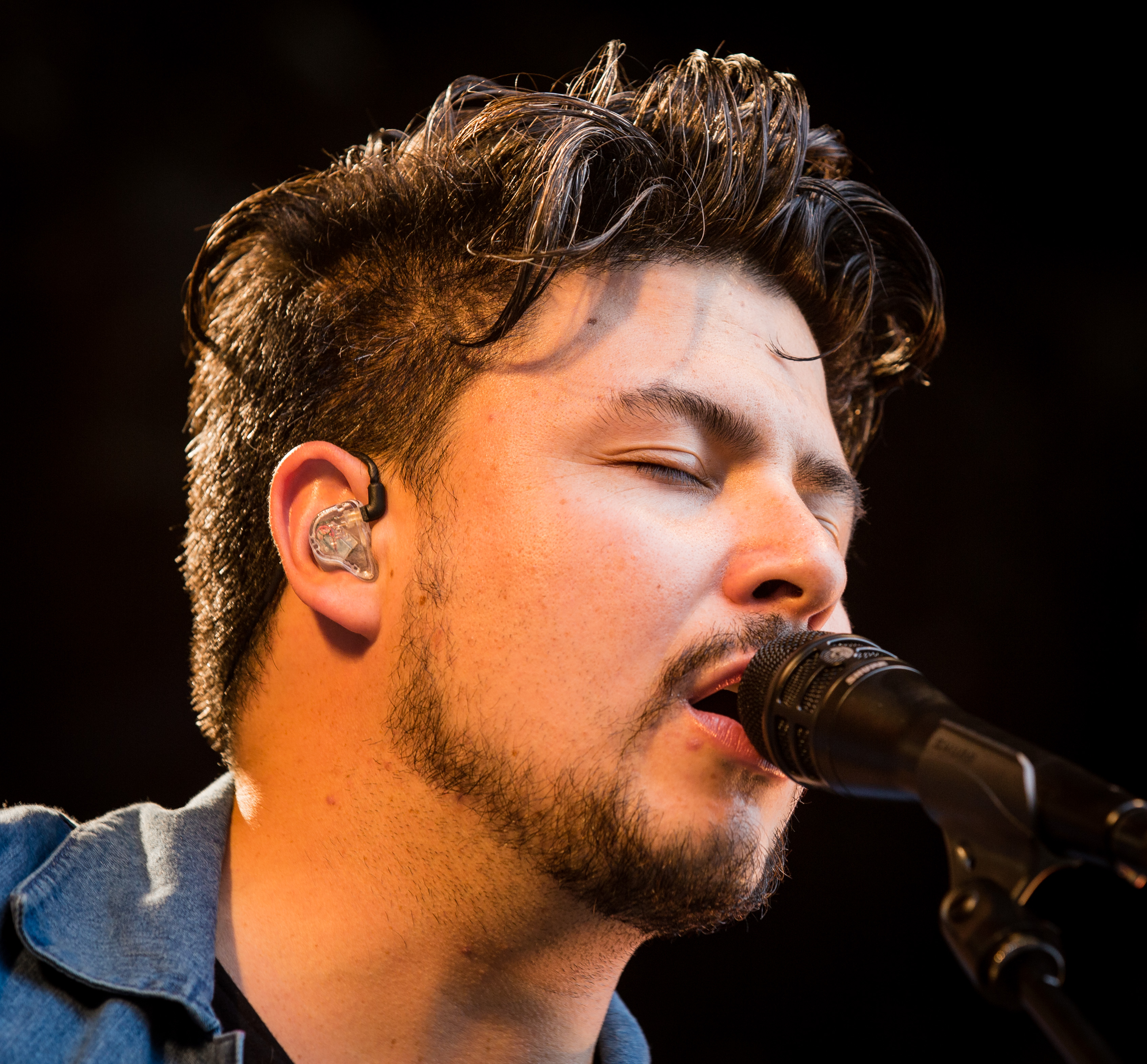
- Woon onstage during the Piknik in Parken festival in Oslo, 2016

Background information
- Born: 29 March 1983 (age 43)
- Origin: New Malden, Kingston upon Thames, London, England
- Genres: Electronica; R&B; trip hop; neo soul; post-dubstep; downtempo
- Occupations: Singer; songwriter; record producer
- Instruments: Vocals; guitar
- Years active: 2006–present
- Label: PMR
- Website: jamiewoon.com

Jamie Woon (born 29 March 1983) is a British singer, songwriter, and record producer signed to PMR Records. He gained widespread acclaim in 2010 for his single "Night Air", which was co-produced by Burial, following his previous independent release, the Wayfaring Stranger EP.

== Biography ==
The son of a Malaysian Chinese father and Scottish mother, Celtic singer Mae McKenna, who also has Irish ancestry, Woon was born and raised in New Malden in the Royal Borough of Kingston upon Thames, Greater London. His parents later divorced. He was educated at Sacred Heart RC Primary School (New Malden), S.T Catherines RC Middle School (Raynes Park) and Wimbledon College (Wimbledon). He later attended the BRIT School, where he graduated the year behind Amy Winehouse, whom he later supported live.

Woon's sound and style is described as soul-inflected vocals backed by samplers and programming, or a single guitar track. He describes his music as "... R&B, it's groove-based vocal-led music ..."

On 4 January 2011, the BBC announced that Woon placed fourth in the BBC's Sound of 2011 poll.

Woon's debut album, entitled Mirrorwriting, was released on 18 April 2011 via Polydor Records.

On 1 May 2012, Woon announced that he had to cancel several upcoming shows due to an injury. Since then, there had been a lull in his activities but in March 2015, he did a collaboration with Portico for their new album Living Fields to be released in April the same year.

In August 2015, a new single, "Sharpness", was released. Benji B revealed in his show on 13 August, that the new album would be called Making Time. It was subsequently released in September the same year.

On 24 July 2025, two new singles "Heavy Going" and "A Velvet Rope", were released.

== Discography ==
=== Studio albums ===
Title	Details	Peak chart positions					
Title	Details	UK	BEL (FL)	DEN	NOR	NLD	SWI
Mirrorwriting	Released: 18 April 2011; Label: Candent Songs, Polydor; Formats: CD, LP, digital download	15	9	17	14	38	50
Making Time	Released: 6 November 2015; Label: PMR; Formats: CD, LP, digital download	50	52	—	—	51	—
3, 10, Why, When	Released: 3 October 2025; Label: Self-released; Formats: CD, LP, digital download	—	—	—	—	—	—
"—" denotes releases that did not chart.

=== Extended plays ===
Title	Details
Wayfaring Stranger	Released: 19 February 2007; Label: Live; Formats: LP, digital download
iTunes Festival: London 2007	Released: 24 September 2007; Label: Onetaste; Formats: Digital download
When	Released: 21 August 2025; Label: Also Can; Formats: Digital download

=== Singles ===
Title	Year	Peak chart positions					Album
Title	Year	UK	BEL	DEN	FRA	NLD	Album
"Robots"	2007	—	—	—	—	—	Non-album single
"Night Air"	2010	67	15	21	—	90	Mirrorwriting
"Lady Luck"	2011	76	29	14	84	56	Mirrorwriting
"Shoulda"	2012	—	53	—	—	—	Mirrorwriting
"Sharpness"	2015	—	—	—	—	—	Making Time
"Heavy Going..."	2025	—	—	—	—	—	3, 10, Why, When
"When"	2025	—	—	—	—	—	3, 10, Why, When
"—" denotes releases that did not chart.

=== Music videos ===
Title	Year	Director
"Wayfaring Stranger"	2007	Sophie Clements
"Spirits"	2008	—
"Night Air"	2010	Lorenzo Fonda
"Lady Luck"	2011	—

=== Other appearances ===
Title	Year	Artist	Album
"January"	2013	Disclosure	Settle
"This Is What It Feels Like"	2013	Banks	London EP
"Where You Gonna Go?"	2014	Paul White	Shaker Notes
"Memory of Newness"	2015	Portico	Living Fields
"Inherent in the Fibre"	2015	Darkstar	Foam Island
"Oceans of Purple"	2016	Dave Okumu	—N/a
"Birdsong"	2019	Rosie Lowe	YU

=== Remixes ===
Title	Year	Artist	Album
"Video Games"	2012	Lana Del Rey	Born to Die

== Awards and nominations ==
Year	Award	Category	Nominee	Result	Ref.
2011	MOBO Awards	Best Newcomer	—N/a	Nominated	
2011	Sound of...	BBC Sound of 2011	—N/a	Nominated	
2016	Mercury Prize		Making Time	Nominated	
