= Tomte (band) =

German indie rock band

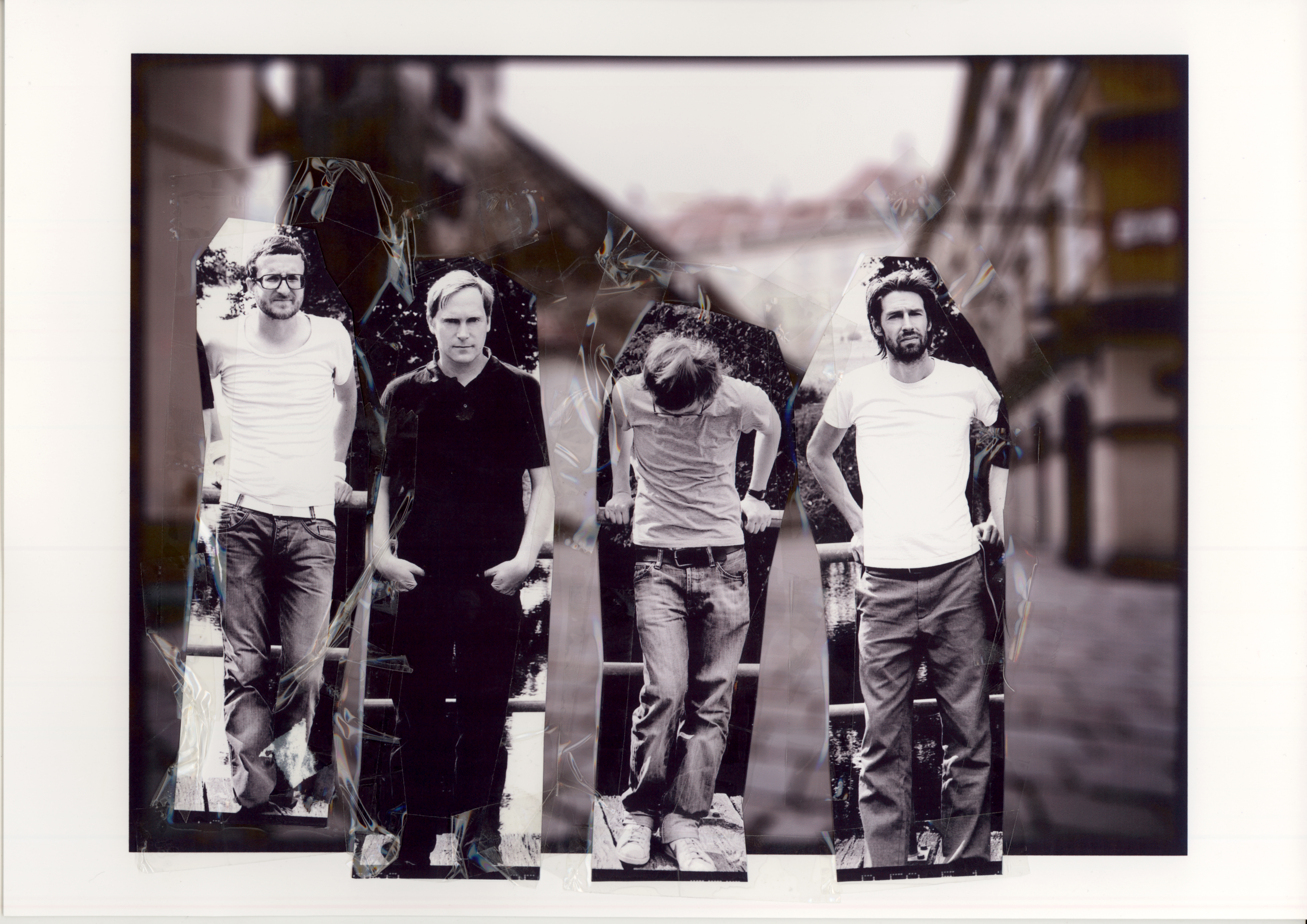

Background information
- Origin: Hamburg, Germany
- Genres: Indie rock
- Years active: 1991–2013
- Labels: Grand Hotel van Cleef
- Past members: Thees Uhlmann; Dennis Becker; Nikolai Potthoff; Max Schröder; Simon Frontzek; Christian Stemmann "Stemmi"; Timo Bodenstein; Oliver Koch
- Website: www.tomte.de

Tomte was an indie band from Hamburg, Germany, formed in 1991. Their lyrics are almost completely in German and their sound could be described as guitar pop with some punk influences. The group are a part of the “Hamburger Schule” (Hamburg indie “school”) on the basis of the band Tocotronic's influence on their work. Singer and guitarist Thees Uhlmann even worked as a roadie for Tocotronic's "K.O.O.K."-Tour and wrote the book "Wir Könnten Freunde Werden..." (We Could Become Friends...) about it.

Tomte's first EP was entitled "Blinkmuffel", which came out in 1996. Two years later, Tomte released their first full-length album, "Du weißt, was ich meine" ("You Know What I Mean"). Following the trend of releasing an album every two years, "Eine sonnige Nacht" ("A Sunny Night") was released in 2000. After the release, former bass-player Christian Stemmann left the band, he was replaced by Oliver Koch.

Tomte's breakthrough album, "Hinter all diesen Fenstern" ("Behind All These Windows"), was released in 2003. It contained two singles, "Schreit den Namen meiner Mutter" ("Scream My Mother's Name") and "Die Bastarde, die dich jetzt nach Hause bringen" ("The Bastards That Are Bringing You Home"), respectively. Moreover, Dennis Becker joined the band in 2003 as second guitarist.

In 2005, Max Schröder joined the band as keyboardist.

The next album, Buchstaben über der Stadt (“Letters above the City”) came out in early 2006. It was one of the best selling German albums of 2006. The first single was Ich sang die ganze Zeit von dir ("I sang of you all the time"). Other singles from this album were "New York" and "Norden der Welt" ("North of the World").

The band have since released another album, called Heureka. It went on sale on 10 October 2008 in the band's native Germany.

Heureka also saw the introduction of a new band member, keyboardist Simon Frontzek. Frontzek, according to reports in the German music press, was initially a fan of the band having been introduced to their music whilst studying in the band's home town of Hamburg. Former keyboardist Max Schröder changed to drums, following the exit of former drummer Timo Bodenstein. Furthermore, former bass player Oliver Koch quit in 2008 due to issues with his wrist, he was replaced by Nikolai Potthoff.

A tour took place in November 2008, which saw performances in German, Austrian and Swiss cities.

== Discography ==
Number	Album title	Translation	Year released
1	Blinkmuffel		1996
2	Du weißt, was ich meine	You Know What I Mean	1998
3	Eine sonnige Nacht	A Sunny Night	2000
4	Hinter all diesen Fenstern	Behind All These Windows	2003
5	Buchstaben über der Stadt	Letters Above The City	2006
6	Heureka	Eureka	2008
