= Year of the Rat (EP) =

EP by Softcult
- Released: April 16, 2021
- Recorded: 2020
- Genre: Grunge; shoegaze; riot grrrl
- Length: 15:57
- Label: Easy Life
- Producer: Phoenix Arn-Horn

Softcult chronology
| Year of the Rat (2021) | Year of the Snake (2022) |

Singles from Year of the Rat
- 1. "Another Bish" Released: January 15, 2021; 2. "Gloomy Girl" Released: March 25, 2021

Year of the Rat is the debut extended play by Canadian grunge duo Softcult, released on April 16, 2021, through Easy Life Records.

== Background and recording ==
In 2017, Courage My Love released their second studio album, Synesthesia. After the album's release, twin siblings Phoenix and Mercedes Arn-Horn found themselves at crossroads with their record label over the band's creative direction; the Arn-Horn siblings spent the remaining years of Courage My Love's existence writing hundreds of songs to appease their label, which ultimately proved to be fruitless and discouraging. The band played their final show in March 2020, just prior to the COVID-19 lockdowns in Canada. In the summer of 2020, the Arn-Horn siblings decided to disband Courage My Love and pursue a new project together where they were free to pursue whatever direction that they wanted.

Year of the Rat was written and recorded during most of 2020 at the band's home studio in Kitchener, Ontario. The EP was produced and engineered by Phoenix Arn-Horn, and was mixed by Chris Perry. Owing to their negative experiences with their former label, Softcult were initially planning on self-releasing their music, until they were urged to sign with a label by their manager.

== Composition and lyrics ==
Year of the Rat has been described as grunge, shoegaze and riot grrrl.

Both Phoenix and Mercedes Arn-Horn considers Year of the Rat to be less developed than the band's subsequent output. Speaking with Rock Sound in February 2022, Mercedes retrospectively described the EP as "dipping our toes in the water and seeing how it would go and how it felt", whilst Phoenix felt that the EP was primarily a homage to their musical influences. Mercedes felt that the EP's lyrics was primarily composed of "blanket statements about issues we were passionate about", and that it was less lyrically honed in than Softcult's later releases.

=== Title and artwork ===
Mercedes has called the EP's title, which also refers to the zodiac year of the rat, a metaphor for the "rat-race". "The artwork for the EP on that one is a bunch of rats running in one direction with one red rat among all these white rats, so that’s supposed to symbolize the ‘rat race’ and how it just takes one person to be like “you know what? I’m doing things differently” to break up a pattern." Although the EP's songs were written during the zodiac year, Year of the Rat was released during the year of the ox.

== Reception ==
Professional ratings
Review scores
| Source | Rating |
|---|---|
| DIY | 3/5 stars |
| Gigwise | 8/10 stars |

Year of the Rat received generally favourable reviews from critics.

== Track listing ==
All tracks are written by Phoenix and Mercedes Arn-Horn

| No. | Title | Length |
|---|---|---|
| 1. | "Another Bish" | 2:55 |
| 2. | "Gloomy Girl" | 3:06 |
| 3. | "Take It Off" | 3:12 |
| 4. | "Young Forever" | 2:44 |
| 5. | "Bird Song" | 4:00 |
| Total length: | | 15:57 |

== Personnel ==
Adapted from Tidal.

Softcult

- Mercedes Arn-Horn – vocals, guitar
- Phoenix Arn-Horn – vocals, drums, production, engineering

Additional personnel

- Chris Perry – mixing
