= Still Love =

Studio album by Teenage Wrist
- Released: August 4, 2023
- Recorded: 2022
- Studios: The Steakhouse (North Hollywood, California); Red Hawk Residency (Yucca Valley, California); Guy Luxe (Glendale, California)
- Genres: Alternative rock; grunge; shoegaze
- Length: 47:06
- Label: Epitaph
- Producer: Kevin McCombs

Teenage Wrist chronology
Earth Is a Black Hole (2021)	Still Love (2023)

Singles from Still Love
- 1. "Sunshine" Released: April 12, 2023; 2. "Diorama" Released: May 9, 2023

Still Love is the third studio album by American alternative rock band Teenage Wrist. The album was released on August 4, 2023, through Epitaph Records.

Two singles were released ahead of the album's release: "Sunshine" and "Diorama".

== Critical reception ==
Professional ratings
Review scores
Source	Rating
Distorted Sound	9/10
Kerrang!	4/5 stars
Sputnikmusic	3.5/5 stars

Still Love received generally positive reviews from contemporary music critics. Emma Wilkes, writing for Kerrang!, gave the album four stars out of five, describing the album as one that "has a beautiful, muted sense of intimacy, bringing an end to a record that ought to push this band as far into the spotlight as they deserve to be." Wilkes further said the album "strips back proceedings to the bare essentials in a way that’s both gauzy and gritty at once, but nonetheless intriguing." Wilkes compared the album to the likes of bands like Fleshwater, Nothing, and Softcult, the latter who feature on the album.

Katie Bird, writing for Distorted Sound praised the album, giving a nine out of 10. In her review, Bird praised the mixing and production of the album, saying that Still Love is "a fantastic album that subverts expectations. It is the result of Gallagher and Salazar‘s passion for music and their fantastic production skills. Each song builds upon the other, whilst also bringing something new to the table, and the band try new things that work really well thanks to the mixing."

== Track listing ==
All music is composed by Teenage Wrist, except where noted.

Still Love track listing
No.	Title	Writer(s)	Length
1.	"Sunshine"	Marshall Gallagher; Anthony Salazar	3:14
2.	"Dark Sky" (featuring SA Martinez)	Gallagher; Doug Martinez; Salazar	3:11
3.	"Still Love" (featuring Softcult)	Mercedes Arn-Horn; Phoenix Arn-Horn; Gallagher; Salazar	3:44
4.	"Digital Self"	Gallagher; Salazar	3:46
5.	"Something Good"	Gallagher; Salazar	4:12
6.	"Wax Poetic" (featuring Sister Void)	Gallagher; Lindsey Nico Mann; Salazar	3:33
7.	"Diorama"	Gallagher; Salazar	3:54
8.	"Cold Case"	Gallagher; Salazar	3:44
9.	"Cigarette Two Step" (featuring Fear Before the March of Flames and David Marion)	Gallagher; David Marion; Salazar	3:55
10.	"Humbug" (featuring Heavenward)	Gallagher; Kamtin Mohager; Salazar	3:14
11.	"Sprawled"	Gallagher; Salazar	5:06
12.	"Paloma a.k.a. Ketamine"	Gallagher; Salazar	5:28
Total length:			47:06

Still Love Sessions cassette included with pre-order bundles of 'Still Love'
No.	Title	Length
1.	"Diorama" (Demo)
2.	"Something Good" (Demo)

== Personnel ==
- Marshall Gallagher – vocals, guitars, bass
- Anthony Salazar – drums, vocals, percussion
- Marshall Gallagher, Anthony Salazar, and Kevin McCombs – production
- Josh Wilbur – mixing
- Kyle McAulay, Sam Madill, Nathaniel Motte – engineering, mixing
- Ted Jensen – mastering
