= 2022 in downloadable songs for the Rock Band series =

- Songs released: 110
- Packs released: 4
- Albums released: 0

The Rock Band series of music video games supports downloadable songs for the Xbox One and PlayStation 4 versions through the consoles' respective online services. Users can download songs on a track-by-track basis, with many of the tracks also offered as part of a "song pack" or complete album at a discounted rate.

== List of songs released in 2022 ==
The following table lists the available songs for the Rock Band series released in 2022. All songs available in packs are also available as individual song downloads on the same date, unless otherwise noted. Dates listed are the initial release of songs on PlayStation Network and Xbox Live.

Starting from October 6, 2015, all music added to the downloadable content catalog is exclusive to Rock Band 4. In addition, due to changes in the charting format and gameplay of Rock Band 4, the released songs no longer support keyboard or Pro guitar and bass (future downloadable content will continue to support vocal harmonies and Pro drum charts), and most songs no longer display "family friendly" or "supervision recommended" ratings. Downloadable content from previous Rock Band titles (excepting The Beatles: Rock Band) is forward-compatible in Rock Band 4 within the same system family (Xbox 360 downloads are usable in the Xbox One version and PlayStation 3 downloads are usable in the PlayStation 4 version) at no additional cost.

Song title	Artist	Year	Genre	Single / Pack name	Release date
"Face Down"	The Red Jumpsuit Apparatus	2006	Emo	Single	Jan 6, 2022
"A Decade Under the Influence"	Taking Back Sunday	2004	Emo	Single	Jan 6, 2022
"¡Olé!"	The Bouncing Souls	1999	Punk	Single	Jan 13, 2022
"Let Me Fall Apart"	Light the Torch	2021	Metal	Single	Jan 13, 2022
"DiE4u"	Bring Me the Horizon	2021	Nu-Metal	Single	Jan 20, 2022
"Only Love Can Save Me Now"	The Pretty Reckless ft. Matt Cameron & Kim Thayil	2021	Rock	Single	Jan 20, 2022
"Sk8er Boi"	Avril Lavigne	2002	Pop-Rock	Single	Jan 27, 2022
"Memory"	Sugarcult	2004	Punk	Single	Jan 27, 2022
"Ain't No King"	The Almost	2019	Rock	Single	Feb 3, 2022
"Secret Garden"	Spiritbox	2021	Metal	Single	Feb 3, 2022
"Light My Love"	Greta Van Fleet	2021	Rock	Single	Feb 10, 2022
"Stay (I Missed You)"	Lisa Loeb	1994	Pop-Rock	Single	Feb 10, 2022
"A Clockwork Expectation"	Fractal Universe	2021	Metal	Single	Feb 17, 2022
"Earth Is A Black Hole"	Teenage Wrist	2021	Alternative	Single	Feb 17, 2022
"Stellar"	Incubus	1999	Alternative	Single	Feb 24, 2022
"Show Me the Way" (Live)	Peter Frampton	1976	Rock	Single	Feb 24, 2022
"Dreaming"	Blondie	1979	New Wave	Single	Mar 3, 2022
"abcdefu"	GAYLE	2021	Pop-Rock	Single	Mar 3, 2022
"Stay High"	Brittany Howard	2019	Rock	Single	Mar 10, 2022
"Take It Off"	The Donnas	2002	Rock	Single	Mar 10, 2022
"Respect"	Aretha Franklin	1967	R&B/Soul/Funk	Single	Mar 17, 2022
"Jolene"	Dolly Parton	1974	Country	Single	Mar 17, 2022
"Waking Up In Vegas"	Katy Perry	2008	Pop/Dance/Electronic	Single	Mar 24, 2022
"Man! I Feel Like a Woman!"	Shania Twain	1997	Country	Single	Mar 24, 2022
"Love It When You Hate Me"	Avril Lavigne ft. Blackbear	2022	Pop-Rock	Single	Mar 31, 2022
"Dead Inside"	Nita Strauss ft. David Draiman of Disturbed	2021	Metal	Single	Mar 31, 2022
"Chaise Longue"	Wet Leg	2022	Indie Rock	Single	Apr 7, 2022
"Devil's Radio"	The Velveteers	2021	Rock	Single	Apr 7, 2022
"Tonight"	Magnolia Park ft. Lil Lotus	2021	Punk	Single	Apr 14, 2022
"Matilda"	PUP	2022	Alternative	Single	Apr 14, 2022
"Gepetto"	Belly	1993	Alternative	Single	Apr 21, 2022
"Connection"	Elastica	1995	Alternative	Single	Apr 21, 2022
"Mouth Shut"	Lit	2022	Alternative	Single	Apr 28, 2022
"Bury Me (Tonight!)"	Save Face	2021	Emo	Single	Apr 28, 2022
"Broken"	Alfie Templeman	2022	Pop/Dance/Electronic	Single	May 5, 2022
"It's Been a Little Heavy Lately"	Joesef	2022	Pop/Dance/Electronic	Single	May 5, 2022
"I Won't Give It Up"	Beartooth	2021	Punk	Single	May 12, 2022
"Pretty Mouth"	girlfriends	2022	Punk	Single	May 12, 2022
"Ready for Combat"	Icon for Hire	2022	Alternative	Single	May 19, 2022
"Down"	St. Vincent	2021	Indie Rock	Single	May 19, 2022
"Making a Fire"	Foo Fighters	2021	Alternative	Single	May 26, 2022
"You Should Be Dancing"	Dee Gees	2021	Alternative	Single	May 26, 2022
"Devils Haircut"	Beck	1996	Alternative	Beck 01	Jun 2, 2022
"Saw Lightning"	Beck	2019	Alternative	Beck 01	Jun 2, 2022
"Sexx Laws"	Beck	1999	Alternative	Beck 01	Jun 2, 2022
"California Dreamin'"	Dirty Honey	2021	Rock	Single	Jun 9, 2022
"Seether"	Veruca Salt	1994	Alternative	Single	Jun 9, 2022
"Cat's in the Cradle"	Harry Chapin	1974	Classic Rock	Single	Jun 16, 2022
"Distance"	Mammoth WVH	2021	Rock	Single	Jun 16, 2022
"The Liars Club"	Coheed and Cambria	2022	Prog	Single	Jun 23, 2022
"Welcome Home" (Note: Song was previously included in Rock Band.)	Coheed and Cambria	2005	Prog	Single	Jun 23, 2022
"Fight for Your Right"	Beastie Boys	1986	Hip-Hop/Rap	Single	Jun 30, 2022
"Bring tha Noize"	Public Enemy ft. Anthrax	1991	Hip-Hop/Rap	Single	Jun 30, 2022
"I Think I'm OKAY"	Machine Gun Kelly, YUNGBLUD & Travis Barker	2019	Alternative	Single	Jul 7, 2022
"The Funeral"	YUNGBLUD	2022	Alternative	Single	Jul 7, 2022
"I Really Like You"	Carly Rae Jepsen	2015	Pop/Dance/Electronic	Single	Jul 14, 2022
"she's all i wanna be"	Tate McRae	2022	Pop-Rock	Single	Jul 14, 2022
"Wild Child"	The Black Keys	2022	Rock	Single	Jul 21, 2022
"Black Summer"	Red Hot Chili Peppers	2022	Alternative	Single	Jul 21, 2022
"when we were young"	Architects	2022	Metal	Single	Jul 28, 2022
"Just Pretend"	Bad Omens	2022	Metal	Single	Jul 28, 2022
"Anything Was Better"	The Interrupters	2022	Punk	Single	Aug 4, 2022
"Let Go"	Potty Mouth	2021	Pop-Rock	Single	Aug 4, 2022
"Love Brand New"	Bob Moses	2022	Pop/Dance/Electronic	Single	Aug 11, 2022
"The Hills"	The Faim	2022	Indie Rock	Single	Aug 11, 2022
"I Like You"	Bloods & Laura Jane Grace	2022	Punk	Single	Aug 18, 2022
"Take Me Away"	Fefe Dobson	2003	Pop-Rock	Single	Aug 18, 2022
"City of the Dead"	Hollywood Undead	2022	Nu-Metal	Single	Aug 25, 2022
"The Foundations of Decay"	My Chemical Romance	2022	Emo	Single	Aug 25, 2022
"Knights of Cydonia"	Muse	2006	Alternative	Muse 01	Sep 1, 2022
"Starlight"	Muse	2006	Alternative	Muse 01	Sep 1, 2022
"Won't Stand Down"	Muse	2022	Alternative	Muse 01	Sep 1, 2022
"The Mother We Share"	CHVRCHES	2013	Alternative	Single	Sep 8, 2022
"What You Know"	Two Door Cinema Club	2010	Indie Rock	Single	Sep 8, 2022
"Iris"	New Found Glory	2007	Punk	Single	Sep 15, 2022
"The Man Who Sold the World" (Live)	Nirvana	1994	Grunge	Single	Sep 15, 2022
"Mercy Me"	Alkaline Trio	2005	Punk	Single	Sep 22, 2022
"Runaway"	Starcrawler	2022	Punk	Single	Sep 22, 2022
"Headsweat"	The Foxies	2022	Pop-Rock	Single	Sep 29, 2022
"Oldest Daughter"	The Wonder Years	2022	Punk	Single	Sep 29, 2022
"Blood for the Blood God" (Note: Song is available at no cost.)	Ben Quad	2022	Emo	7th Anniversary Free DLC Pack	Oct 6, 2022
"End of the World"	Gulfer	2021	Emo	7th Anniversary Free DLC Pack	Oct 6, 2022
"Where the Heart Is"	Sweet Pill	2022	Emo	7th Anniversary Free DLC Pack	Oct 6, 2022
"Bombs Away"	Blastergun	2022	Rock	Single	Oct 13, 2022
"DIE OUT HERE"	DE'WAYNE ft. POORSTACY	2022	Alternative	Single	Oct 13, 2022
"Life Was Easier When I Only Cared About Me"	Bad Suns	2022	Indie Rock	Single	Oct 20, 2022
"F.C.P.R.E.M.I.X."	The Fall of Troy	2005	Rock	Single	Oct 20, 2022
"Canned Heat"	Jamiroquai	1999	R&B/Soul/Funk	Single	Oct 27, 2022
"Hard Times"	Paramore	2017	Pop-Rock	Single	Oct 27, 2022
"Rollercoaster"	Bleachers	2014	Alternative	Single	Nov 3, 2022
"Soak Up the Sun"	Sheryl Crow	2002	Pop-Rock	Single	Nov 3, 2022
"The Pallbearer Walks Alone"	The Dark Element	2019	Metal	Single	Nov 10, 2022
"Rainbow in the Dark" (Note: Song was previously included in Rock Band 3.)	Dio	1983	Metal	Single	Nov 10, 2022
"Sabotage"	Beastie Boys	1994	Hip-Hop/Rap	Rock Band Rewind 01 (Note: Song is available as individual tracks on PlayStation but is only available as a pack for Xbox.)	Nov 17, 2022
"Foreplay/Long Time"	Boston	1976	Classic Rock	Rock Band Rewind 01	Nov 17, 2022
"Dead on Arrival"	Fall Out Boy	2003	Pop-Rock	Rock Band Rewind 01	Nov 17, 2022
"Go with the Flow"	Queens of the Stone Age	2002	Alternative	Rock Band Rewind 01	Nov 17, 2022
"Cherub Rock"	Smashing Pumpkins	1993	Alternative	Rock Band Rewind 01	Nov 17, 2022
"I Can't Wait"	Ceramic Animal	2022	Alternative	Single	Nov 22, 2022
"I Ain't Worried"	OneRepublic	2022	Pop-Rock	Single	Nov 22, 2022
"Don't Fence Me In"	Amyl and the Sniffers	2021	Punk	Single	Dec 1, 2022
"Kiss Me Deadly"	Lita Ford	1988	Glam	Single	Dec 1, 2022
"Bonnie"	Cuffed Up	2021	Indie Rock	Single	Dec 8, 2022
"Crash Into Me"	Dave Matthews Band	1996	Rock	Single	Dec 8, 2022
"Radio Reject"	Magnolia Park	2022	Punk	Single	Dec 15, 2022
"Pass the Nirvana"	Pierce the Veil	2022	Emo	Single	Dec 15, 2022
"Hello There" (Note: Song was previously included in Rock Band 2.)	Cheap Trick	1977	Pop-Rock	Single	Dec 22, 2022
"Classless Act"	Classless Act ft. Vince Neil of Mötley Crüe	2022	Rock	Single	Dec 22, 2022
"Groove Is in the Heart"	Deee-Lite	1990	Pop/Dance/Electronic	Single	Dec 29, 2022
"Numb"	Marshmello and Khalid	2022	Pop/Dance/Electronic	Single	Dec 29, 2022
