= Honey Moon Drips =

Studio album by The Chain Gang of 1974
- Released: May 29, 2020
- Recorded: July–November 2019
- Genre: Indie pop; synth-pop; electronic rock
- Length: 42:25
- Label: Fever Ltd.

The Chain Gang of 1974 chronology
Felt (2017)	Honey Moon Drips (2020)

Singles from Honey Moon Drips
- 1. "Such A Shame" Released: April 26, 2019; 2. "YDLMA" Released: June 21, 2019; 3. "Bends / The Hurt Is Good" Released: March 25, 2020; 4. "4AM, Still Lonely" Released: April 15, 2020

Honey Moon Drips is the fifth studio album by The Chain Gang of 1974. The album was released on May 29, 2020 through Fever Ltd.

== Background ==
Following the release of Felt, Kamtin Mohager spent 2018 working on his side project, Teenage Wrist, where they released their debut studio album, Chrome Neon Jesus. Following a year of touring and support of the album, Mohager released the single "Burn Out" in February 2019. This was led with singles throughout 2019, including collaborations with Flux Pavilion.

In September 2019, Mohager announced that he was working on a new album that would be released sometime in 2020. The album's name and announcement came on April 15, 2020 with the release of the single "4AM, Still Lonely". Additionally, the 2019 singles “Such A Shame” and “YDLMA” were included in the album.

== Track listing ==
All music is composed by Kamtin Mohager

Honey Moon Drips track listing
No.	Title	Length
1.	"Honey Moon Drips"	0:50
2.	"Do You Mind?"	3:09
3.	"Giving It Up"	3:35
4.	"YDLMA"	3:46
5.	"The Hurt Is Good"	3:21
6.	"Fervor"	1:17
7.	"Times We Had"	3:42
8.	"I Think We Need To Sleep"	3:26
9.	"Philosophy Of Love"	3:34
10.	"Bends" (featuring TWINKIDS)	3:32
11.	"Champagne Saturday"	3:35
12.	"4AM, Still Lonely"	3:35
13.	"Such A Shame"	5:03
Total length:		42:25
