= When a Flower Doesn't Grow =

Studio album by Softcult
- Released: January 30, 2026
- Genre: Shoegaze; grunge; indie pop; punk; dream pop
- Length: 30:18
- Label: Easy Life
- Producer: Phoenix Arn-Horn

Softcult chronology
Heaven (2024)	When a Flower Doesn't Grow (2026)

Singles from When a Flower Doesn't Grow
- 1. "Pill to Swallow" Released: April 25, 2025; 2. "Naive" Released: July 9, 2025; 3. "16/25" Released: September 4, 2025; 4. "She Said, He Said" Released: October 22, 2025; 5. "Queen of Nothing" Released: December 10, 2025

When a Flower Doesn't Grow is the debut studio album by the Canadian rock duo Softcult, released on January 30, 2026, through Easy Life Records.

== Critical reception ==
Professional ratings
Aggregate scores
Source	Rating
Metacritic	86/100
Review scores
Source	Rating
DIY	3.5/5 stars
Dork	4/5
Kerrang!	4/5
laut.de	4/5 stars
New Noise Magazine	4/5 stars
NME	5/5 stars
Stereoboard	4/5 stars

On the review aggregator website Metacritic, When a Flower Doesn't Grow holds a score of 86 out of 100, based on five reviews, indicating "universal acclaim".

== Track listing ==
All tracks are written by Phoenix Arn-Horn and Mercedes Arn-Horn.

No.	Title	Length
1.	"Intro"	1:41
2.	"Pill to Swallow"	3:43
3.	"Naive"	2:47
4.	"16/25"	2:31
5.	"She Said, He Said"	3:02
6.	"Hurt Me"	2:22
7.	"I Held You Like Glass"	3:07
8.	"Queen of Nothing"	3:01
9.	"Tired"	1:13
10.	"Not Sorry"	2:50
11.	"When a Flower Doesn't Grow"	4:01
Total length:		30:18

== Personnel ==
Credits adapted from Tidal.

=== Softcult ===
- Phoenix Arn-Horn – lead vocals, drums, production
- Mercedes Arn-Horn – lead vocals, electric guitar

=== Additional contributor ===
- João Carvalho – mastering
