= Felt (The Chain Gang of 1974 album) =

Studio album by The Chain Gang of 1974
- Released: June 23, 2017
- Recorded: 2016–17
- Genre: Electronic rock
- Length: 36:11
- Label: Caroline
- Producer: Thom Powers

The Chain Gang of 1974 chronology
Daydream Forever (2014)	Felt (2017)	Honey Moon Drips (2020)

Felt is a studio album by the American musician Kamtin Mohager, released under his indietronica name, The Chain Gang of 1974. The fourth studio album by The Chain Gang of 1974, it was the second album released under a major label on June 23, 2017, by the Virgin Records subsidiary Caroline Records. The album, described by Mohager as the most "honest" album he has created, represents a change of the Chain Gang's sound to a more pop-centric approach, detailing the personal experiences of Mohager and "the feelings of [his] past". The album's sound is the result of Mohager being exposed to new sounds during his time writing songs outside of the Chain Gang, in the years following the successful Daydream Forever. The album was produced by Thom Powers of The Naked and Famous, and has a guest appearance by the band's lead singer, Alisa Xayalith. Powers befriended Mohager after years of touring together, and became involved in the production of Felt early on. The album's release was preceded by live performances by the Chain Gang and the release of three tracks from the album as singles and extended plays in 2016 and 2017. On release, the album was met with positive reviews.

== Background ==
In February 2014, Mohager released Daydream Forever, The Chain Gang of 1974's third album, and the first released by a major label, Warner Bros. Records. The album followed the success of Mohager's song "Sleepwalking", which was used heavily in advertising for the 2013 Rockstar North open world action-adventure video game Grand Theft Auto V and was on its official soundtrack and in-game. The success of the track helped the album, which also included the similarly commercially exposed track "Miko", peak at 36 on the Billboard Heatseekers Albums chart, The Chain Gang of 1974's first appearance on a US national record chart. In the years following the release of Daydream Forever, Mohager took up songwriting outside of The Chain Gang of 1974, including writing and recording the extended play Dazed in 2015, as part of Teenage Wrist, a side-project formed with another 3OH!3 touring member, Marshall Gallagher. Mohager also occasionally created remixes of other tracks as The Chain Gang of 1974. From his works outside of creating Chain Gang albums, Mohager used his new-found experience and familiarity with unfamiliar sounds to createsongs for his fourth studio album. Felt represents a more pop-oriented approach to The Chain Gang of 1974, with Mohager having found "pleasure in a chord progression that unites big crowds", during the period before the album's production, justifying that "as long as the song has a bit of an 'X-Factor' to it, I am now no longer afraid of creating more pop-oriented music".

== Composition ==
"I Still Wonder"

"Looking for Love"
The pop-inspired music on Felt has been characterized as "moodly and upbeat", while accompanied by lyrics that detail Mohager's feelings about past personal experiences.

Mohager described Felt as an exploration of "love, heartbreak, infidelity, addiction, death, [and] family", saying that the album was him openly discussing "the feelings of [his] past". In composing what he felt was the most "honest" album he has created, he deemed Felt to be an album that represented him "as a human being". The second track on Felt, "Wallflowers", was inspired by an idea he had of "two people only being able to be with each other in their dreams. While awake, they are forced to be separate. But in their dreams, they're able to travel to one another and live in a made up world. A fantasy land of sorts." The album's third track, "I Still Wonder", was characterized as "moody and upbeat" with an "'80s vibe" by Brian Leak of Substream Magazine. Mohager said that the song "focuses on infidelity, and how physical desire can slowly transform into love", further exploring the song's themes by writing, "Sometimes you have no control over who you fall in love with. Even when you’ve been living with certain morals for your entire life, someone can come around and change everything. I fell for a girl that I wasn’t supposed to fall for. The guilt will always win, leaving the relationship torn, but with time your mind will always go back and think, “What if?” A lot of the time, due to fear, there is never any closure. This song touches on that."

== Recording ==
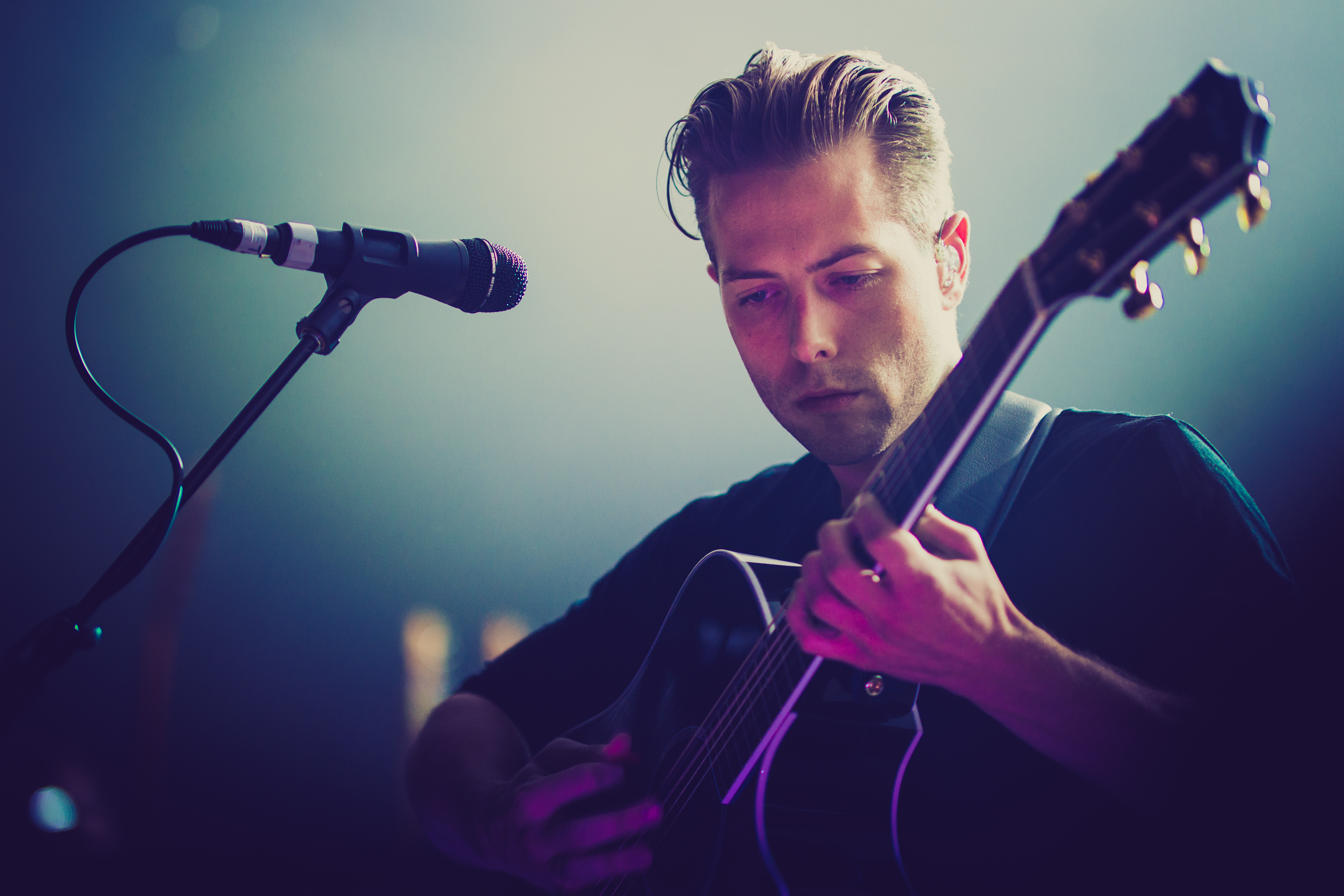
Thom Powers of The Naked and Famous co-wrote and produced the album

Felt was recorded with the producer Thom Powers from The Naked and Famous. While Mohager and The Naked and Famous have performed together on occasions since 2012, it took Powers to "[reach] out on a very humble level" to Mohager for a musical relationship between the two to start. Powers' involvement in Felt started in 2015, when Mohager demoed a few songs he had written for a potential new album to him, and afterwards started to write songs together for a year, before going into the studio to record and produce the album itself. Mohager himself deemed Powers to be the "perfect producer for this album", describing him as a "key factor in pushing me to be more confident with my songwriting, even to the point where he encouraged me to start taking vocal lessons and learning more about my craft". The album's fourth track, "Forget", features guest vocals from The Naked and Famous' lead singer Alisa Xayalith.

== Promotion ==
In late 2016, two tracks that eventually appeared on Felt were released as singles and extended plays while the album was still being recorded. "I Still Wonder", the album's third track, and "Slow", the opening track, were released in September and November 2016 respectively, the latter accompanied by a music video which was premiered on Billboard and features Curt Smith of Tears for Fears. The video, comprising a single long take, was described by director Morgan Freed as a "showcase [of Mohager] as what he is: an artist telling a story". Mohager said that the collaboration with Smith was "surreal moment", himself being a follower of Tears for Fears, saying "to see Curt singing one of my songs is something I will never forget". After the two songs were premiered, they became setlist staples of The Chain Gang of 1974's live performances in North America as a supporting act for The Naked and Famous' tour for Simple Forms in late 2016, and in winter 2017 for both AFI's tour supporting their eponymous tenth album, and a headlining tour shortly after. Other then-unreleased songs written for the album were also played during their performances, such as "Wallflowers" and "Human". "Wallflowers" was released in March 2017, accompanying the official announcement of Felt, its track listing and release date of June 23, 2017, with pre-orders active for the album's digital and vinyl versions; no compact disc version of the album was released. The music video for "Wallflowers" was released in May, presented in a documentary-style format chronicling the love story of an Iranian girl battling cancer, whose family migrated to the United States, and a boy who grew up in Orange County, California. The inspiration for the video came from Mohager's own feeling that "Wallflowers" was "bigger than [him]; a story needed to be told with the song serving solely as its soundtrack", and thus sought to create a video that represents love, care, and "all of us."

== Reception ==
Professional ratings
Review scores
Source	Rating
AllMusic	4/5 stars

Matt Collar of AllMusic, in a positive review of the album, marked it as "far more clear-eyed, thematically and musically focused album" than Mohager's previous albums, while commenting that Felt was not a "departure", but rather a "distillation of the most potent elements of the band's sound". Collar noted that the more emotionally-driven style worked in the album's favour, concluding that the record was "a big, joyous, confident album -- but it's a confidence dusted with pathos".

== Track listing ==
All tracks produced by Thom Powers, with Kamtin Mohager as "executive producer".

Felt
No.	Title	Writer(s)	Length
1.	"Slow"	Kamtin Mohager; Thom Powers	4:20
2.	"Wallflowers"	Nick Bailey; Mohager; Powers; Austin Tirado	3:56
3.	"I Still Wonder"	Mohager; Powers; Tirado	4:37
4.	"Forget" (featuring Alisa Xayalith)	Mohager; Powers; Alisa Xayalith	5:06
5.	"Looking for Love"	Mohager; Powers	3:22
6.	"It Needs You"	Mohager; Powers	3:28
7.	"Bliss"	Mohager; Powers	3:37
8.	"Human"	Mohager; Powers	3:49
9.	"Temptation"	Bailey; Mohager; Ryan Ogren; Powers	3:56
Total length:			36:11

== Personnel ==
Credits adapted from the Felt liner notes.

The Chain Gang of 1974

- Kamtin Mohager – vocals, instruments, executive producer

Technical personnel

- Joe LaPorta – mastering
- Lars Stalfors – engineer, mixer

Artwork

- Justin Bettman – photography, album cover
- Isabel Galler – layout

Additional musicians

- Nick Bailey – songwriter (track 2, 9)
- Thom Powers – songwriter, producer
- Ryan Ogren – songwriter (track 9)
- Austin Tirado – songwriter (track 2)
- Alisa Xayalith – vocalist, songwriter (track 4)
