= IFH =

IFH may refer to:

- Inova Fairfax Hospital
- Icon for Hire, an American rock band
