= Icon for Hire (album) =

Studio album by Icon for Hire
- Released: October 15, 2013
- Recorded: 2013
- Studio: NRG Recording Studios, North Hollywood, California
- Genre: Alternative metal
- Length: 42:44
- Label: Tooth & Nail
- Producer: Mike Green

Icon for Hire chronology
Scripted (2011)	Icon for Hire (2013)	You Can't Kill Us (2016)

Singles from Icon for Hire
- 1. "Cynics & Critics" Released: August 16, 2013; 2. "Sugar & Spice" Released: October 3, 2013; 3. "Counting on Hearts" Released: January 14, 2014; 4. "Sorry About Your Parents" Released: September 8, 2014

Icon for Hire is the second studio album by American rock band Icon for Hire, released on October 15, 2013, through Tooth & Nail Records. It was recorded with producer Mike Green (All Time Low, Pierce the Veil) at NRG Recording Studios in North Hollywood, California. It is a musical departure from the band's debut album Scripted (2011), incorporating elements of hip hop, electronica, dubstep, and post-hardcore into the band's previously established hard rock style. The tracks "Cynics & Critics", "Sugar & Spice", "Counting on Hearts" and "Sorry About Your Parents" were released as singles. Upon release, the album received largely positive reviews and debuted at No. 66 on the Billboard 200.

== Release and promotion ==
The album was officially announced with a lyric video for first single "Cynics & Critics", released on August 15, 2013. Preorders for the album were made available the following month. A short clip of the song "Sugar & Spice" was released on October 3, 2013. Tooth & Nail announced they would be releasing another single, "Counting on Hearts". The final single was announced on September 8, 2014. The song was revealed to be "Sorry About Your Parents".

== Critical reception ==
Professional ratings
Review scores
Source	Rating
AllMusic	3.5/5 stars
CCM Magazine	4/5 stars
Christian Music Zine	4/5 stars
CM Addict	4/5 stars
HM	4/5 stars
Jesus Freak Hideout	2/5 stars 2.5/5 stars
Mind Equals Blown	8.5/10 stars
New Release Tuesday	4.5/5 stars
Outburn	8/10

Icon for Hire received mostly positive critical reception. William James of Outburn said that the band "courageously bucks the standard female fronted act comparisons" with the release, and noted how the group "wisely self-titled this record, confidently assuring listeners that this is their definitive work." At CCM Magazine, Matt Conner felt that the band was "clearly up to the challenge" with the album that proves "the best is yet to come from Tooth & Nail's young anchors." Mary Nikkel of New Release Tuesday described the album as an "edgy masterpiece in the tradition of Nine Inch Nails or Linkin Park," praising the lyrics for their "delicate balance between honesty...and hope," and declaring the album "a milestone moment, both for the band and for their genre as a whole." AllMusic's Matt Collar praised the band's "passionate, high-energy music" and Ariel's "resonant vocal chops". Micah Garnett of Christian Music Zine stated "this album takes the best features from Scripted and improves upon them substantially." He concludes his review by saying "this is one of the best rock albums of the year." Kelcey Wixtrom of CM Addict called it "an impressive album." From Mind Equals Blown's Jeremy Vane-Tempest: "If you want a tonne of fun ... listen to Icon for Hire."

By contrast, Jesus Freak Hideout's Michael Weaver declared that the album "finds the band trying too hard: Trying too hard to be different, trying too hard to be hip, and trying too hard to be cute and interesting lyrically," and labeled it "the very definition of sophomore slump." Second Opinion reviewer Cortney Warner further noted that the lyrics "can come across as snarky and defensive, which can sometimes make it difficult to appreciate and empathize with their music," and felt it to be a "step backwards from their debut", despite praising the "diverse" music as a highlight of the album.

== Commercial performance ==
For the Billboard charting week of November 2, 2013, Icon for Hire was the No. 66 most sold album in the entirety of the United States by the Billboard 200, and it was the No. 4 Top Christian Album sold the same week. On the other charts, it was the No. 20 most sold album on Top Rock Albums chart, the No. 16 Top Alternative Albums, the No. 8 Top Hard Rock Albums, and it came in at No. 11 on the Independent Albums chart.

== Track listing ==
All tracks are written by Icon For Hire

No.	Title	Length
1.	"Cynics & Critics"	3:22
2.	"Nerves"	3:15
3.	"Sugar & Spice"	4:02
4.	"Hope of Morning"	3:49
5.	"Sorry About Your Parents"	3:17
6.	"Pop Culture"	3:23
7.	"Watch Me"	3:34
8.	"Slow Down"	3:46
9.	"Rock and Roll Thugs"	3:36
10.	"Think I'm Sick"	2:54
11.	"Fix Me"	3:47
12.	"Counting on Hearts"	3:59
Total length:		42:44

== Personnel ==
Icon for Hire

- Ariel – lead vocals, keys
- Shawn Jump – guitar, bass, background vocals, programming, sampling, synthesizer
- Josh Kincheloe – bass
- Adam Kronshagen – drums

Additional personnel

- Mike Green – producer, engineering, mixing, programming, synthesizer
- Jeff Sontag – assistant engineer
- Kyle Black – assistant engineer
- Troy Glessner – mastering engineer
- Piper Ferguson – photography
- Patrice Murciano – artwork, portraits
- Seth Lunsford – art design, package layout

== Charts ==
Chart (2013)	Peak position
US Billboard 200	66
US Top Alternative Albums (Billboard)	16
US Christian Albums (Billboard)	4
US Top Hard Rock Albums (Billboard)	8
US Independent Albums (Billboard)	11
US Top Rock Albums (Billboard)	20
