= Make a Move =

Make a Move may refer to:

- Make a Move (album), by Gavin DeGraw
- Make a Move (film), a film directed by Niyi Akinmolayan, starring Ivie Okujaye
- "Make a Move" (Incubus song)
- "Make a Move" (The Black Seeds song)
- "Make a Move" (Icon for Hire song)
- "Wake Up (Make a Move)", a song by Lostprophets
- "Make a Move on Me", a song by Olivia Newton-John
- "Make It Move", a song by Spiffy The Goat with a remix featuring Sada Baby

== See also ==
- Make Your Move (disambiguation)
