= See You in the Dark =

EP by Softcult
- Released: March 24, 2023
- Recorded: 2022
- Genres: Grunge; shoegaze; pop
- Length: 20:19
- Label: Easy Life
- Producer: Phoenix Arn-Horn

Softcult chronology
Year of the Snake (2022)	See You in the Dark (2023)	Heaven (2024)

Singles from See You in the Dark
- 1. "One of a Million" Released: September 23, 2022; 2. "Drain" Released: November 2, 2022; 3. "Someone2Me" Released: December 14, 2022; 4. "Dress" Released: January 17, 2023; 5. "Love Song" Released: February 24, 2023

See You in the Dark is the third extended play by Canadian grunge duo Softcult, released on March 24, 2023 through Easy Life Records. It was recorded in 2022 between their tours that year, and consists of material that was left off the duo's previous EP, Year of the Snake (2022). Although still containing elements of grunge, See You in the Dark is less musically heavy than the duo's prior output, with its more atmospheric sound being based in shoegaze and pop. As with most of Softcult's work, the EP's lyrics touch on a variety of personal and political subject matters, including toxic masculinity, trauma and insecurities.

See You in the Dark received generally positive reviews from critics, who praised its production, vocals and overall growth from Softcult's past releases. The EP received a Juno Award nomination for Alternative Album of the Year award at the Juno Awards of 2024. Softcult embarked on an international tour in support of the EP throughout 2023.

== Music, writing and recording ==
See You in the Dark has been described as grunge, shoegaze and pop. Although featuring some of Softcult's darkest lyrical themes yet, See You in the Dark is less musically aggressive than their previous works, with Kerrang! noting, "their fury is veiled in a dreamy, atmospheric sound." The EP was recorded in 2022 at Softcult's home studio in Kitchener, Ontario, in between their tours that year. It was produced and engineered by Phoenix Arn-Horn, and was mixed by Chris Perry. The EP's material was written around the same time as their second EP, Year of the Snake (2022), but the Arn-Horn siblings ultimately opted to leave them off of the release. "We don’t like waiting too long in between releases to put something out, so I think there was a little pressure to just keep writing while we still felt inspired and not take a break", Phoenix has said; "I feel like after putting out our first two EPs, we were ready to try some new things and really push ourselves to go out of the box."

"Drain" exudes frustration towards the climate crisis and the corporations responsible for it. "Dress", which Stereogum described as the EP's darkest song, discusses sexual assault, consent and trauma; Mercedes Arn-Horn likened the song's deceptively poppy nature to Foster The People's "Pumped Up Kicks", feeling that "The story we were trying to tell in the lyrics seemed appropriate to make a party song". "Someone2Me" critiques the rise of toxic masculinity, and was inspired by an incel who harassed Phoenix and Mercedes online for three years. Mercedes has said: "They [incels] have nothing in their life; their hate is what sustains them. They have so much time on their hands because no-one wants to be around someone like that." Phoenix initially developed the song as a "weird industrial track" incorporating synths and feedback, before Mercedes added guitars and bass so it "sounded like [Softcult]". "One of a Million" discusses Mercedes' personal insecurities of "being ordinary and unexceptional", and doubles as a celebration of individuality and diversity. "Love Song" is "an anxious love song" about "loving someone so intensely that you find yourself in constant fear of losing them", whilst "Spoiled" is about self-sabotage.

The EP's title was derived from a quote by Friedrich Nietzsche from his 1886 book Beyond Good and Evil. Mercedes Arn-Horn has said: "It is an analogy for the things we’re afraid to face. It represents confronting our innermost fears, usually in those vulnerable moments lying awake at night when our minds are racing. It’s sort of an acknowledgement of our darkness, and the darkness of others, like 'hey, I see you'."

== Release and reception ==
Professional ratings
Review scores
Source	Rating
DIY	3.5/5 stars
Exclaim!	8/10
Kerrang!	4/5
Louder Sound	3.5/5 stars

See You in the Dark was released on March 24, 2023, on CD, cassette and streaming formats. The cassette version of the album was released as a limited edition of 200 copies, and features an engraved case. From April to November 2023, Softcult toured across Canada, the United States, Europe and Asia in support of the EP. The band also appeared at the Canadian Music Week festival from June 5 to June 10, 2023.

See You in the Dark received generally positive reviews from critics. Exclaim!'s Owen Morawitz praised Mercedes' vocal performances on the EP, as well its production and thematic "deft touch of self-assurance". Jake Richardson of Kerrang! described the EP "very well put together", and praised its "gorgeous" vocal melodies. Writing for DIY, Ben Tipple praised the "gentle ebb and flow" of the EP's "dark inevitability", although he felt that its "powerful words" were sometimes lost underneath its "comparably calm soundscapes". Flood Magazine's Juan Gutierrez found See You in the Dark to be "more harmonious, reflective, and lyrically mature" than Softcult's previous efforts, and hailed the EP as "subversive art at its finest".

The EP received a Juno Award nomination for Alternative Album of the Year award at the Juno Awards of 2024.

== Track listing ==
All tracks are written by Phoenix and Mercedes Arn-Horn.

No.	Title	Length
1.	"Drain"	3:22
2.	"Dress"	3:26
3.	"One of a Million"	3:36
4.	"Someone2Me"	3:46
5.	"Love Song"	2:51
6.	"Spoiled"	3:16
Total length:		20:19

== Personnel ==
Adapted from Tidal.

Softcult

- Mercedes Arn-Horn – vocals, guitar
- Phoenix Arn-Horn – vocals, drums, production, engineering

Additional personnel

- Chris Perry – mixing
