= Miko (song) =

Single by The Chain Gang of 1974
- Released: July 31, 2013
- Genre: Electronic rock
- Length: 3:02
- Label: Warner Bros.
- Songwriter(s): Kamtin Mohager
- Producer(s): Kamtin Mohager; Isom Innis

The Chain Gang of 1974 singles chronology
"Undercover" (2011)	"Miko" (2013)	"Sleepwalking" (2014)

Miko is a song written by American electronic rock musician Kamtin Mohager, known by his stage name, The Chain Gang of 1974. The song was originally recorded by Mohager for his third studio album, Daydream Forever, where it appears as the fifth track. A "Miko" single, featuring the track of the same name, was released in the United States on July 31, 2013, as the lead single promoting Daydream Forever.

== Usage in media ==
"Miko" has so far been used once in commercial media. The Daydream Forever track was featured in the in-game soundtrack of the 2013 Electronic Arts Canada sports association football simulation video game FIFA 14. The track was one of 37 tracks from various artists included in the game's soundtrack.

== Music video ==
While no music video was produced to accompany the release of the "Miko" single, a lyric video was released on August 1, 2013. The lyric video, featuring New York City landmarks such as the George Washington Bridge, was filmed in Manhattan. The video highlights Fast forwarded and reversed monochrome film of a drive through the streets of Manhattan as the lyrics of the song are superimposed over it. The film is occasionally split and/or duplicated on-screen into thirds. halves and sixths.

== Track listing ==
Digital download
No.	Title	Writer(s)	Producer(s)	Length
1.	"Miko"	Kamtin Mohager	Mohager; Isom Innis	3:02

== Personnel ==
Adapted from Daydream Forever liner notes.

The Chain Gang of 1974

- Kamtin Mohager – vocals, music, production

== Release history ==
=== Commercial ===
Country	Date	Format	Label
United States	July 31, 2013	Digital download	Warner Bros. Records
Australia	August 2, 2013	Digital download	Warner Bros. Records
United Kingdom	August 2, 2013	Digital download	Warner Bros. Records
