= Daydream Forever =

Studio album by The Chain Gang of 1974
- Released: 4 February 2014
- Recorded: October 8, 2012 – February 4, 2013; (Malibu, California)
- Genres: Indietronica; electronic rock
- Length: 38:37
- Label: Warner Bros.
- Producers: Kamtin Mohager; Isom Innis

The Chain Gang of 1974 chronology
Wayward Fire (2011)	Daydream Forever (2014)	Felt (2017)

Daydream Forever is the third studio album by American indietronica musician Kamtin Mohager's project The Chain Gang of 1974. Released on February 4, 2014, by Warner Bros. Records, it is the major label debut of The Chain Gang of 1974, whose previous records were released under indie label Modern Art Records. The album is a follow-up to the project's 2013 single "Miko", which features as the fifth track on the album, and successful promotional single "Sleepwalking", which also features on the album, as the third track.

== Background ==
Born in San Jose, California and raised in Hawaii before moving to Denver, Kamtin Mohager joined 3OH!3 as a touring bassist from 2007 through 2010. He subsequently self-released Fantastic Nostalgic: The Early Recordings in 2010. That year also saw the release of his full-length debut, White Guts. Mohager moved to Los Angeles to record the follow-up album, Wayward Fire, which was released on Modern Art Records in 2011.

== Recording ==
Daydream Forever was recorded with producer Isom Innis, of Foster the People fame. The album was recorded over the course of seventeen weeks from October 8, 2012 to February 4, 2013 in Malibu, California. Six of the working titles for songs placed for recording during the creative process for Daydream Forever were "This Godless Girl", "Lola Suzanne", "Witch", "Strfck" [sic], "Sleepwalking", and "Melbourne".

== Critical reception ==
Professional ratings
Review scores
Source	Rating
AllMusic	3/5 stars
Alternative Press	3.5/5 stars
Earmilk	8.5/10

At Alternative Press, Dan LeRoy rated the album three-and-a-half out of five stars, stating that this album is not intended "for revivalists only". Fred Thomas of AllMusic wrote that Mohager's songwriting "channels heroes like Duran Duran, Simple Minds, Echo & the Bunnymen, and OMD", and called the album "a must for anyone in an especially strong phase of '80s nostalgia".

== Track listing ==
All tracks are written by Isom Innis and Kamtin Mohager except where noted.

Daydream Forever
No.	Title	Writer(s)	Producer(s)	Length
1.	"Ordinary Fools"		Innis; Mohager	2:51
2.	"You"		Innis; Mohager	3:00
3.	"Sleepwalking"	James Bailey; Rami Jrade; Mohager; Ryan Ogren	Mohager	3:37
4.	"Lola Suzanne"	Sean Cimino; Innis; Mohager	Innis; Mohager	4:21
5.	"Miko"		Innis; Mohager	3:02
6.	"Godless Girl"		Innis; Mohager	3:59
7.	"Witch"		Innis; Mohager	4:16
8.	"Moksha"		Innis; Mohager	1:09
9.	"Mouth"		Innis; Mohager	3:58
10.	"Death Metal Punk"		Innis; Mohager	3:42
11.	"Plum"		Innis; Mohager	4:42
Total length:				38:37

Daydream Forever digital download
No.	Title	Writer(s)	Producer(s)	Length
12.	"Sleepwalking" (Dawn Golden remix)	Bailey; Jrade; Mohager; Ryan	Dexter Tortoriello	3:09
13.	"Miko" (Blood Diamond remix)		Michael Diamond	3:36
Total length:				45:22

== Personnel ==
The Chain Gang of 1974

- Kamtin Mohager – vocals, music, production

Additional personnel

- Isom Innis – production

== Charts ==
Chart	Peak position
US Heatseekers Albums (Billboard)	36

== Release history ==
Country	Date	Format	Label	Catalog no.
United States	February 4, 2014	CD	Warner Bros. Records	540888
United States	February 4, 2014	Digital download	Warner Bros. Records	none
