= You Can't Kill Us =

Studio album by Icon for Hire
- Released: November 25, 2016
- Genres: Alternative rock; rap rock; electropop
- Length: 44:09
- Label: Independent
- Producer: Mike Green

Icon for Hire chronology
Icon for Hire (2013)	You Can't Kill Us (2016)	Still Can't Kill Us: Acoustic Sessions (2018)

You Can't Kill Us is the third studio album by American rock band Icon for Hire. Released on November 25, 2016, the album was released independently.

== Background ==
On March 15, 2016, the band announced a Kickstarter campaign for their third album, You Can't Kill Us. The album would be released throughout the year, with three new songs released to campaign backers every three months. The band raised $127,200, exceeding their initial goal of $2,016. "Supposed to Be" was released as the lead single from the album among its first group of releases, and received a music video on July 22, 2016, which was directed by Jamie Holt and included fans who donated to their Kickstarter campaign.

"War" is a rework of "Perfect Storm", a demo which the band performed as early as 2014.

Professional ratings
Review scores
Source	Rating
The Prelude Press	5/5 stars

== Track listing ==
All lyrics are written by Icon for Hire; all music is composed by Ariel.

No.	Title	Length
1.	"Supposed to Be"	3:49
2.	"Demons"	3:24
3.	"Pulse"	3:11
4.	"The Magic"	3:36
5.	"Happy Hurts"	3:59
6.	"You Were Wrong"	3:21
7.	"Too Loud"	2:51
8.	"War"	3:34
9.	"Under the Knife"	3:39
10.	"Here We Are"	3:16
11.	"Get Well II"	3:03
12.	"Invincible"	3:06
13.	"You Can't Kill Us"	3:20
Total length:		44:09

== Personnel ==
Adapted from the album liner notes.

Icon for Hire

- Ariel - lead and backing vocals, keyboards
- Shawn Jump - lead and rhythm guitars, programming, producer

Additional musicians

- Cory O' Donoghue - guest vocals on "You Can't Kill Us"
- Brittany Egan - guest vocals on "You Can't Kill Us"
- Kerry Marley - guest vocals on "You Can't Kill Us"
- Adam Byerly - guest vocals on "You Can't Kill Us"
- Aaron James Halvorson - guest vocals on "You Can't Kill Us"

Production

- Mike Green - producer, mixer
- Kris Crummett - mastering
- Ford Fairchild - photography
- Kyle Crawford - layout, design

== Chart performance ==
Chart (2016)	Peak position
US Billboard 200	180
US Top Alternative Albums (Billboard)	10
US Top Hard Rock Albums (Billboard)	5
US Independent Albums (Billboard)	9
US Top Rock Albums (Billboard)	16
