= Amorphous (album) =

Studio album by Icon for Hire
- Released: February 19, 2021
- Studio: Addiction Studio
- Genres: Rap rock, alternative rock, hard rock, hip-hop, pop rock
- Length: 39:14
- Label: Kartel
- Producers: David Thulin, Shawn Jump

Icon for Hire chronology
Still Can't Kill Us: Acoustic Sessions (2018)	Amorphous (2021)	The Reckoning (2022)

Amorphous is the fourth studio album by American rock band Icon for Hire. Produced by David Thulin and Shawn Jump, the work was published on February 19, 2021, via Kartel Music Group.

== Critical reception ==
New Noise Magazine stated that "This latest record poignantly continues the project's longtime fresh and emotionally invigorating energy" and that "the project combines a synthy journey with jarring hard rock riffs".

Jeannie Blue of Cryptic Rock describes the album as "chock full of passionate emotions, eclectic influences, and enough courage to perpetually defy genre within the span of each individual track".

Ian Kenworth of Punktastic states that the work "pushes the electronic sound further still, so that every song feels ambitious and arena-sized, even the interludes" and that "it makes for a bold record and there is a lot to enjoy here".

Scott Raymer of ConcertCrap states that "Amorphous is about defiance, not giving in, taking control and fighting for yourself".

BroadwayWorld describes "Their previous singles including "Seeds" and "Last One Standing" are rebellious opuses, instilling a message of self-belief and empowerment, not just in an industry that has pushed back at the band with numerous challenges, but for their entire fan base in general".

== Track listing ==
Amorphous track listing
No.	Title	Length
1.	"Brittle (prelude)"	0:44
2.	"Brittle"	3:29
3.	"Curse or Cure"	3:20
4.	"Enemies"	3:13
5.	"Panic Attacks"	3:31
6.	"Seeds"	3:11
7.	"Thirteen (interlude)"	1:12
8.	"Background Sad"	3:31
9.	"Last One Standing"	3:24
10.	"Waste My Hate"	2:27
11.	"Impossibles and Obstacles (interlude)"	1:05
12.	"Sticks and Stones"	2:54
13.	"Warrior"	3:31
14.	"Only Be a Story"	3:42
Total length:		39:14

Deluxe edition
No.	Title	Length
15.	"Struggle, Succeed, Rewind, Repeat"	3:34
16.	"Venom"	2:55
17.	"Hollow"	3:19
18.	"Blindside"	3:17
Total length:		52:19

Extended edition
No.	Title	Length
19.	"Curse or Cure - Acoustic"	3:26
20.	"Last One Standing - Acoustic"	3:15
21.	"Seeds - Acoustic"	3:49
22.	"Brittle - Acoustic"	3:32
23.	"Background Sad - Acoustic"	3:27
24.	"Background Sad - Radio Edit"	3:26
Total length:		1:13:??

== Personnel ==
Credits adopted from album's liner notes

Icon For Hire

- Ariel Bloomer - vocals
- Shawn Jump - lead guitar, backing vocals, programming, synth, co-producer

Additional musicians

- Miles McPherson - drums
- Josiah Prince - additional guitars
- Romesh Dodangoda - mixing
- Eliana Heeren - backing vocals

Additional personnel

- Rob McDermott - executive producer
- Simon Lovell - layout, design
- Howie Weinberg - mastering
- Will Borza - mastering
- Doltyn Sneddon - photography
- David Thulin - engineer, co-producer, programming, synth
