= Make Your Move =

Make Your Move may refer to:

- Make Your Move, a pricing game on the TV series The Price Is Right
- Make Your Move (album), a 1979 album by Captain & Tennille
- "Make Your Move" (song), a 2011 song by Third Day
- "Make Your Move", a song by Rainbow on their 1983 album Bent Out of Shape
- "Make Your Move", a song by Hieroglyphics on their 2003 album Full Circle
- Make Your Move (film), a 2013 dance film directed by Duane Adler

== See also ==
- Make a Move (disambiguation)
