= Halflives =

French-Italian alternative rock band

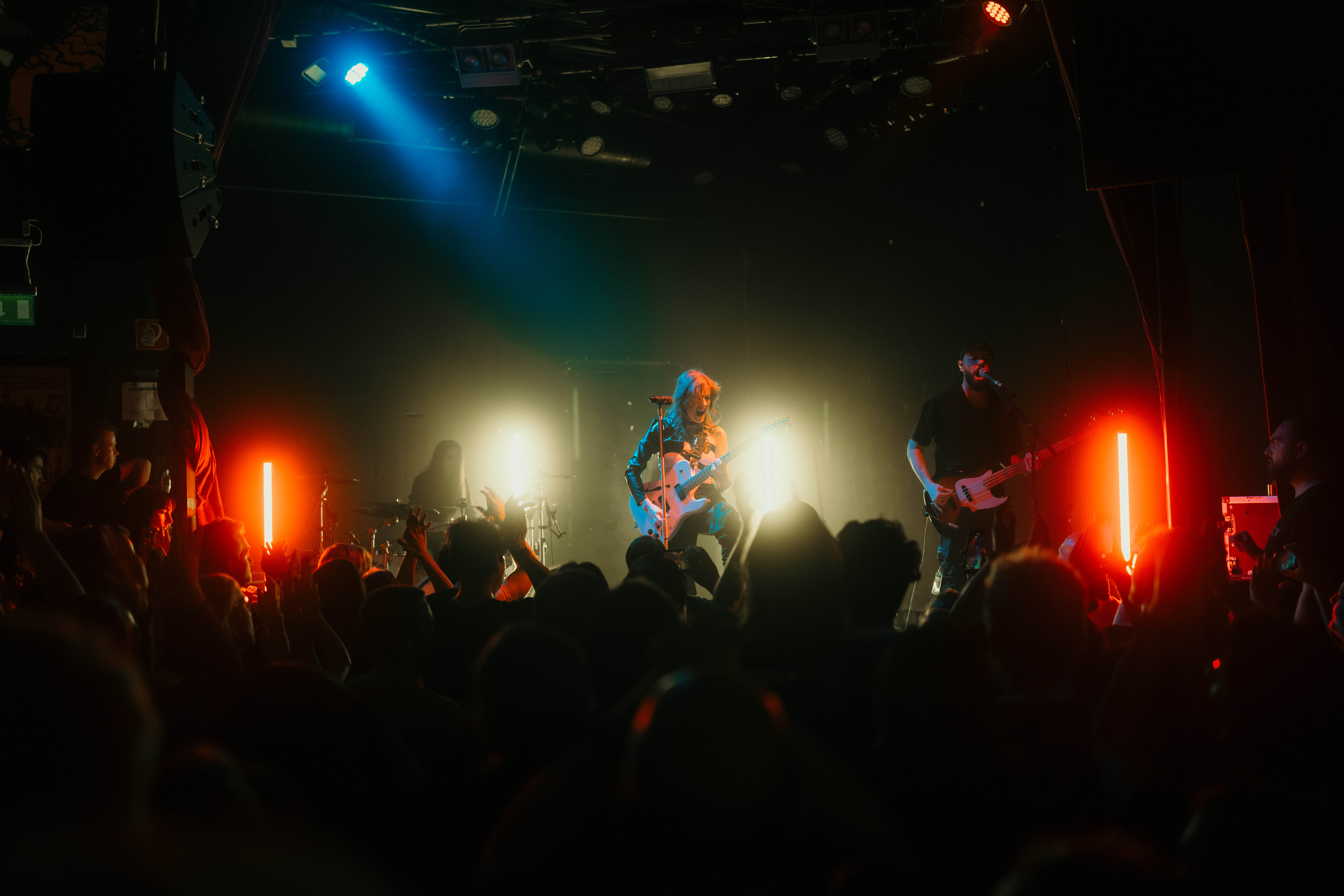
- Halflives live in Munich (2024)

Background information
- Origin: Modena, Italy
- Genres: Alternative rock, pop rock
- Years active: 2016–present
- Members: Linda Battilani; Gloria Simonini (touring); Enrico Bertoni / Marco Montipo' / Lorenzo Di Girolamo (touring)
- Website: wehavehalflives.com

Halflives is an alternative rock band from Modena, Italy. Following several lineup changes, the band is now a solo project composed of frontwoman Linda Battilani.

After releasing their debut 8-track record "Empty Rooms" in the spring of 2017 they toured Europe supporting Courage My Love, playing 14 concerts from 20 May (Radolfzelle) to 4 June (Manchester). In 2018 they headlined several tours in Europe and released two standalone singles "Crown" and "Fugitive". Early in 2019 they toured in the UK supporting The Faim and Chapel and appeared at Rock for People. In 2020 they released their EP "Resilience", including the single "Time Bomb" featuring Kellin Quinn from Sleeping with Sirens. They toured Europe early 2020 with Icon for Hire and released their single "Villain" in November of that year. Their next EP "V" came out on 2 July 2021; it includes the singles "Victim", "Vibe", "Valkyrie" and "Villain". In 2022 Halflives toured Europe with Against The Current in April and Halocene in November.

With the release of "V", lead vocalist Linda Battilani announced that the project switched from band to solo project.

In 2023 Halflives released a new EP titled "Inferno" featuring singles like "Dynamite", "Everybody Knows It" and "Oblivion". In 2024 the touring activity of Halflives intensified with their first headliner tour (Inferno Tour) throughout Europe, performing 13 concerts beginning on 29 February in Manchester to 16 March in Prague. In the summer of 2024 Halflives supported Palaye Royale on their summer shows in Europe and appeared on Open Flair's main stage in Germany. In November and December 2024 Halflives toured Europe once more supporting Smash Into Pieces across 17 concerts and Delilah Bon at Cassiopeia in Berlin . On 29 March 2025, Halflives announced their 5th studio album "How Much a Heart Can Take Before It Breaks", which was released months later on 11 April, just days before the kick-off of their 2025 European "Golden Era Tour".

Linda Battilani's Halflives live band often appears as a trio: Linda (Vocals / Guitars), Gloria Simonini (Drums) while the third musician often switches between Marco Montipò, Enrico Bertoni or Lorenzo Di Girolamo (Bass and/or Guitars).

== Members ==
Current members

- Linda Battilani – lead vocals, (2016-present), guitar (2019-present)

Touring members

- Gloria Simonini - Drums (2022-present)
- Enrico Bertoni – Guitar (2021-present), Bass (2022-present)
- Lorenzo Di Girolamo – Guitar (2020-present)
- Marco Montipó – Bass (2024-present)

Former members

- Oscar Scantamburlo – bass, keyboards, percussion (2016-2021), guitar (2019-2021)
- Fede Bernardi – drums (2016-2022)
- Matteo "Matt" Mantovani - guitar, piano (2016-2017)
- Enrico Bertoni - guitar, backing vocals (2016-2018)
- Antonin "Tony" Carré - guitar, backing vocals (2018-2019)

== Discography ==
=== EPs ===
- Empty Rooms (2017)
- Resilience (2020)
- V (2021)
- Inferno (2023)
- Inferno (End of the World Edition) (2024)
- How Much a Heart Can Take Before It Breaks (2025)

=== Singles ===
- "Mayday" (2016), on Empty Rooms
- "Burn" (2016), on Empty Rooms
- "Echo" (2017), on Empty Rooms
- "Crown" (2018)
- "Fugitive" (2018)
- "Rockstar Everyday" (2019), on Resilience
- "Snake" (2020), on Resilience
- "Hard to Break" (2020), on Resilience
- "Time Bomb" (2020), on Resilience
- "Rockstar Everyday (MC4D Remix)" (2020)
- "Fugitive (Reimagined)" (2020)
- "Villain" (2020), on V
- "Everyday Rockstars" (Vini Vici vs. Ranji) (2021)
- "Vibe" (2021),
- "Victim" (2021),
- "Valkyrie" (2021),
- ”Dynamite” (2022),
- "sorry mom x" (2022).
- "everybody knows it" (2023)
- "jealous." (2024)
- "perfectly broken" (2024)
- "Immortals" (2025)
- "No Way Out" (2025)
