= Scripted =

Studio album by Icon for Hire
- Released: August 23, 2011
- Recorded: September–December 2010
- Studio: Nashville, Seattle
- Genre: Alternative metal; hard rock; electronic rock; pop punk
- Length: 31:47
- Label: Tooth & Nail
- Producer: Rob Hawkins, Aaron Sprinkle

Icon for Hire chronology
The Grey EP (2009)	Scripted (2011)	Icon for Hire (2013)

Singles from Scripted
- 1. "Make a Move" Released: July 5, 2011; 2. "Get Well" Released: October 29, 2011; 3. "Off With Her Head" Released: November 20, 2011; 4. "Fight" Released: December 3, 2011; 5. "The Grey" Released: December 10, 2011

Scripted is the debut studio album by American rock band Icon for Hire. It was released on Tooth & Nail Records on August 23, 2011, and went on to break the label's new artist record for albums sold during the first week of release.

== Background ==
This is the band's first label release; they had released two EPs prior to being signed, Icon for Hire EP (2008) and The Grey EP (2009). Three songs from those recordings reappear here with altered arrangements and lyrics: "Off with Her Head", "The Grey", and "Only a Memory" (originally called "Pernilla"). Two other songs were also reworked but only released as bonus tracks in the Japanese Edition: "Call Me Alive" and "Fall Apart". This is also the band's first recording without original bassist Joshua Davis; Josh Kincheloe would be brought in to replace him in 2011.

== Recording and production ==
The album was recorded during the last quarter of 2010 and was co-produced by Rob Hawkins and Aaron Sprinkle. Recording was done in two parts: first with Hawkins in Nashville, then with Sprinkle in Seattle. Frontwoman Ariel commented on working with the two: "Their work selves could not have been more opposite. We worked with Rob first and it was like go, go, go from nine to five everyday solid and [then] we get to Aaron. He was just like so chilled. Just hanging out. He’s like, 'We’ll get to it when we get to it.' So, it was a lot of adjusting to the two extremes of work styles."

== Release and promotion ==
"Make a Move" and "Get Well" were both released as singles (the former as a lead single) and both had music videos made for them. "Make a Move" gained popularity on RadioU and its video premiered as an exclusive on Guitar World's website on August 15, 2011.

== Reception ==
Professional ratings
Review scores
Source	Rating
About.com	4.5/5 stars
AllMusic	3.5/5 stars
CCM Magazine	4/5 stars
The Christian Manifesto	3.5/5 stars
Christian Music Zine	4/5 stars
CM Addict	3.5/5 stars
Cross Rhythms	9/10 stars
HM	3/5 stars
Indie Vision Music	4/5 stars
Jesus Freak Hideout	3.5/5 stars 3/5 stars
Louder Than the Music	3.5/5 stars
New Release Tuesday	4.5/5 stars
The Phantom Tollbooth	3.5/5 stars

The album received mostly positive reviews from the critics. Kim Jones of About.com wrote that "Scripted offers fans of rock a lot of passion, completely authentic lyrics and hard-hitting music that will appeal to your inner head banger, regardless of your age. Icon For Hire has a lot to offer and their debut album satisfies while leaving you wanting more." Jamie Maxwell of Cross Rhythms praised the "sheer energy" of the guitar work, as well as the "real honesty and originality" of the lyrics, he conceded that the band "straddle that fine line of credibility between an honest, edgy statement and an embarrassing copycat act," although ultimately claiming to be "fairly satisfied that Icon For Hire manage the former, and they manage it better than the vast majority of mainstream artists, let alone those in the Christian music scene." New Release Tuesday's Kelly Sheads vowed that "Scripted does not disappoint."

Andy Argyrakis of CCM Magazine found that "there's actually many more facets to its label debut Scripted", which this is found in the instruments used such as "brooding guitars, monstrous drums, and ferocious vocals," and noted that "there's a harder overall edge, merged with and underlying pop sensibility. All the while, the group sings of shedding depression and seizing each day, which is just as vital and powerful as the accompanying sounds." Christian Music Zine's Tyler Hess said that Scripted is "full of tracks that can both rock your face off and edify you hearts." Indie Vision Music evoked how "This album does show hints of similarity with acts like Flyleaf & The Letter Black, but at the core this album is genuine."

David Jeffries of AllMusic was complimentary, calling the band "intense and infectious in equal measure" and praising their "fresh attitude and sense of purpose". The Christian Manifesto's C. E'Jon Moore found that "Scripted is a strong debut that stands on its own and demands our respect", which that is because "Scripted features all the necessary pieces without feeling derivative." Grant Yoder of CM Addict surmised that "Overall this album is very good, but left me wanting more." Louder Than the Music's Jono Davies said that "The production on this album is top notch, for a band made up of three members they seem to have created a full sounding album." Matt Crosslin of The Phantom Tollbooth stated that "Regardless of influences the songs are catchy and filled with passion and energy."

Jesus Freak Hideout reviewers Nathaniel Schexnayder and Michael Weaver were more reserved; despite praising the production and the album's overall enjoyability, Schexnayder found the lyrical quality mixed and the album's sound generic: "To recap, complete with puns: although Icon For Hire’s first album is well-acted with slick, catchy refrains, they never deviate from the script to truly be a genuinely remarkable production." Weaver also criticized the band's unoriginal sound, but expressed appreciation for the band's "tongue-in-cheek mentality" and optimism that "album number two will be powerful and a little more unique." At HM magazine, Joanna Lugo wrote that the lyricism is very familiar and the band has an "edgy pop sound", which the releases "overall production and fluidity [...] proves to be one of quality and continuity."

Unanimous praise was given to lead singer Ariel's vocal work: Jeffries called her "a mix of powerful and approachable that might very well be the inspiration for the band’s tongue-in-cheek name"; Maxwell noted that "what is most notable, and most commendable, about this album is the sheer force with which singer Ariel delivers her vocals"; and Schexnayder reported that her "voice runs seamlessly through the tunes without ever going overboard like her fellow label mates in The Letter Black", calling her voice "gifted" and one of the reasons to be interested in the album.

== Track listing ==
Standard and digital edition
No.	Title	Writer(s)	Length
1.	"Overture" (Instrumental)	Hawkins	0:29
2.	"Theatre"	Icon for Hire	2:42
3.	"Make a Move"	Icon for Hire	3:03
4.	"Get Well"	Icon for Hire, Sprinkle	2:57
5.	"The Grey"	Icon for Hire	3:27
6.	"Off with Her Head"	Icon for Hire, Joshua Davis	3:05
7.	"Fight"	Icon for Hire, Sprinkle, Ben Kasica	3:00
8.	"Up in Flames"	Icon for Hire, Sprinkle, Christopher Stephens	2:48
9.	"Iodine"	Icon for Hire	2:32
10.	"Only a Memory" (originally released as "Pernilla")	Icon for Hire, Joshua Davis	3:50
11.	"Pieces"	Icon for Hire, Hawkins	3:54
Total length:			31:51

Japanese edition
No.	Title	Writer(s)	Length
12.	"Fall Apart"	Icon for Hire, Joshua Davis	3:15
13.	"Call Me Alive"	Icon for Hire, Joshua Davis	4:47
Total length:			39:49

== Personnel ==
Musicians

- Ariel — lead vocals
- Shawn Jump — guitar
- Adam Kronshagen — drums

Production

- Matthew Arcaini — digital editing, engineer
- Chris Carmichael — strings
- Matt Carter — bass, engineer
- Ryan Clark — graphic design
- Joshua Davis — composer ("Off with Her Head" and "Only a Memory")
- Brandon Ebel — executive producer
- Troy Glessner — mastering engineer
- Rob Hawkins — bass, guitar, composer, ("Overture" and "Pieces"), producer, programming, string arrangements, synthesizer
- Ben Kasica — composer/lyricist ("Fight")
- Cabel Kuhl — photography
- J. R. McNeely — mixing
- Ben Phillips — engineer
- Adam Skatula — A&R
- Aaron Sprinkle — composer, engineer, keyboards, percussion, producer, programming
- Christopher Stephens — composer ("Up In Flames")

== Charts ==
Chart (2011)	Peak position
Billboard 200	95
Billboard Top Rock Albums	22
Billboard Top Christian Albums	5
Billboard Top Modern Rock/Alternative Albums	16
Billboard Top Hard Rock Albums	7
Billboard Alternative Albums	16
