= These Hearts =

American post-hardcore band

- Origin: Fargo, North Dakota
- Genres: Easycore, post-hardcore, pop punk
- Years active: 2007–2013, 2022-present
- Label: Victory
- Spinoffs: FM All-Stars
- Members: Ryan Saunders; Kyle Colby; Daryl Van Beek; Tyler Rice; Isaiah Folk
- Past members: Skyler Patzer; Tom Westerholm; Greg Gentzkow
- Website: facebook.com/thesehearts

These Hearts is an American post-hardcore band from Fargo, North Dakota. The band started making music in 2007, and they disbanded in late 2013. The band released two full-length studio albums on Victory Records. Forever Ended Yesterday, was released in 2011, Yours to Take, was released in 2013 by the aforementioned label. This album was their breakthrough release upon the Billboard charts. In 2022, the band announced a reunion

== Music history ==
The band commenced as a musical entity in 2007, with their first release, Mistakes and Second Takes, an extended play, that was released on September 16, 2008, independently. They released, Forever Ended Yesterday, a studio album, on June 21, 2011, from Victory Records. Their subsequent studio album, Yours to Take, was released by Victory Records, on July 19, 2013. This album was the groups breakthrough release upon the Billboard charts, where it peaked at No. 36 on the Christian Albums chart, while it peaked at No. 33 on the Heatseekers Albums chart.

In 2022, a reunion tour was announced. Among multiple headline dates were shows including I Set My Friends On Fire, Sink In, and Across The White Water Tower.

== Members ==
Final Lineup

- Ryan Saunders – lead vocals (2007–2013, 2022–present)
- Kyle Colby – lead guitar, backing vocals (2009–2013, 2022–present)
- Daryl Van Beek – guitar (2007–2013, 2022–present)
- Tyler Rice – bass (2011–2013, 2022–present)
- Isaiah Folk – drums (2007–2013, 2022–present)

Past members

- Skyler Patzer – bass, piano (2007–2010)
- Greg Gentzkow – bass (2010)
- Tom Westerholm – guitar (2008)

== Discography ==
Studio albums

- Forever Ended Yesterday (June 21, 2011, Victory)
- Yours to Take (July 9, 2013, Victory)

EPs

- Mistakes and Second Takes (September 16, 2008, Independently)
