= Synesthesia (Courage My Love album) =

Studio album by Courage My Love
- Released: February 3, 2017
- Genre: Pop punk, synthpop
- Length: 40:33
- Label: Warner Bros. Records

Courage My Love chronology
Becoming (2015)	Synesthesia (2017)

Singles from Synesthesia
- 1. "Stereo" Released: 2 December 2016

Synesthesia is the second and final studio album from Canadian pop punk band Courage My Love. It was released on February 3, 2017.

Synesthesia is Courage My Love's second full-length album, the first being a re-release of a previous EP. The album combines the pop punk sound the band is known for, plus elements of synthwave and synthpop. The album was influenced by drummer Phoenix Arn-Horn teaching herself synth programming.

Professional ratings
Review scores
Source	Rating
Volume	7.2/10 stars

== Background ==
"Synesthesia is very much new age, with a mix of pop, punk, indie and dance" says Jared Allen of Volume Magazine.

"These songs are all composed well." said NewNoise. "They’re broad and diverse, creeping up on the necks of bands similar in style. But, this trio doesn’t want to be pigeonholed, they want to hit the ground running with their guts intact and the music pulsating in those veins. All the tracks on Synesthesia are expertly driven."

She Shreds Magazine interviewed the band when the single "Stereo" was released. The interview states that, "Songwriting was done in two phases. The first lasted nearly two years before an initial recording session and the remainder of the album was developed from there. “We knew going in that we didn’t want to rush anything (as much as we all wanted new music out ASAP),” Mercedes says. “We knew that at this stage in our career this album was pretty much make or break. This would be the turning point. So we couldn’t allow any filler songs. That’s why the last five songs, especially, had to be above and beyond anything we’d done before. There was a lot of pressure, but sometimes pressure can lead to an amazing end result.”

In an interview with AltPress, lead singer Mercedes Arn-Horn describes the album as "a story everyone can relate to. A heartbreak, a crisis of faith, and also the long struggle toward regaining your self-esteem and self-respect. We chose the title Synesthesia because we thought it was the perfect concept for trying to describing the feeling of being lost and overwhelmed by emotions."

== Track listing ==
All tracks are written by Courage My Love.

No.	Title	Length
1.	"Synesthesia"	0:49
2.	"Animal Heart"	3:20
3.	"Walls"	3:39
4.	"Stereo"	3:17
5.	"Love Hurts"	3:15
6.	"Drowning"	3:43
7.	"Tough Love"	3:34
8.	"Two Headed Monster"	3:34
9.	"Sight:Sound"	1:06
10.	"Need Someone"	3:29
11.	"Dirt"	3:34
12.	"The Year I Disappeared"	3:25
13.	"Never Gonna Change"	3:08
14.	"Taste:Touch"	0:40

=== Music videos ===
- Stereo
- Need Someone
- Animal Heart
- Walls

== Personnel ==
- Mercedes Arn-Horn - Vocals, guitars
- Phoenix Arn-Horn - Drums, vocals, synths
- Brandon Lockwood - Bass
