= Courage My Love =

Canadian rock band

- Origin: Kitchener, Ontario, Canada
- Genres: Pop punk; alternative rock; synthpop
- Years active: 2009–2020
- Labels: InVogue; Warner Music Canada; Grizz Rhythms; Spinning
- Spinoffs: Softcult
- Past members: Mercedes Arn-Horn; Phoenix Arn-Horn; Brandon Lockwood; David Blake-Dickson
- Website: ilovecouragemylove.com

Courage My Love was a Canadian rock band from Kitchener, Ontario, Canada. Formed in 2009, the band consisted of twin siblings, Mercedes Arn-Horn and Phoenix Arn-Horn, in addition to bassist Brandon Lockwood.

== History ==
The group was discovered at a battle of the bands in Stratford, Ontario in early 2010, and were soon signed to Warner Music Canada. They took their band name from a quote in the H.G. Wells movie Things to Come.

The core of the group are twin siblings Mercedes and Phoenix Arn-Horn who are both classically trained in voice, piano, guitar, and cello. Bassist Brandon Lockwood was recruited in 2013 after original bassist David Blake-Dickson decided to depart from the band for personal reasons.

In 2012, they were named one of the Top 100 Bands You Need to Know by Alternative Press Magazine An extended version of their For Now EP was released July 18, 2012, on Grizz Rhythms/Spinning.

To promote their third EP, Becoming, the band produced a 6-part spoof Reality TV show, The (Un)Real Lives of Courage My Love, which was released on the band's YouTube Channel.

In August 2013, they were featured on the cover of Canadian Musician magazine. The feature article focused on the band's approach to finding success in the new music industry by utilizing social media to interact with fans all over the world.

The band was nominated for 'Breakthrough Group of the Year' at the 2014 Juno Awards.

On February 11, 2015, Courage My Love signed to Ohio-based independent recording label InVogue Records. Courage My Love later re-released Becoming as a full-length album under InVogue Records on March 24, 2015.

The band was also featured on the InVogue Records first Christmas compilation album Happy Holidays, I Miss You. They contributed their cover of "Last Christmas" originally by the English band Wham! released Thanksgiving 2016.

In 2017, the band released their second full-length record Synesthesia through Warner Canada and toured Europe and the UK with Halflives.

The band released their sixth EP Spectra independently in 2020. The same year, Courage My Love disbanded due to the Arn-Horn siblings' disillusionment with the band, feeling that they had been creatively stifled by their record label and lost their sense of direction. They went on to form a new band together, Softcult.

== Band members ==
- Mercedes Arn-Horn – lead vocals, lead guitar (2009–2020)
- Phoenix Arn-Horn – drums, keyboard, backing vocals (2009–2020)
- Brandon Lockwood – bass guitar, backing vocals (2013–2020)
- David Blake-Dickson – bass guitar, backing vocals (2009–2012)

== Awards and nominations ==
Award	Year	Nominated work	Category	Result
JUNO Awards	2014	Becoming (EP) - Courage My Love	Breakthrough Group of the Year	Nominated

== Discography ==
=== Albums ===
- 2015: Becoming (Full-Length)
- 2017: Synesthesia

=== EPs ===
- 2011: For Now
- 2012: For Now (Acoustic Sessions)
- 2013: Becoming (EP)
- 2014: Spirit Animal
- 2014: Skin and Bone
- 2020: Spectra
- 2020: Teenagers (remixes)

=== Singles ===
- Kerosene (2015)
- Remission (2018)
- Teenagers (2019)
- Teenagers (reimagined) (2019)
- Harlequin Romance (2019)
- Harlequin Romance (reimagined) (2019)
- Slow Motion (2019)
- Girls (2020)
- Sugar Hiccup (Cocteau Twins cover) (2020)

=== Other appearances ===
- 2016: Happy Holidays, I Miss You - "Last Christmas" (Wham! cover)

== Music videos ==
- "I'll Be Home for Christmas" (2010)
- "Bridges" (2010)
- "OMG" (2011)
- "I Sell Comics" (2011)
- "Barricade" (2011)
- "Do You Hear What I Hear?" (2011)
- "Anchors Make Good Shoes (If You Have Issues)" (2011)
- "You Don't Know How" (2013)
- "Wolves" (2013)
- "Cold-Blooded" (2013)
- "Skin & Bone" (2014)
- "Kerosene" (2015)
- "Stereo" (2016)
- "Need Someone" (2017)
- "Animal Heart" (2017)
- "Tough Love" (2018)
- "Remission " (2018)
- "Teenagers" (2019)
- "Teenagers Reimagined" (2019)
- "Harlequin Romance" (2019)
- "Girls" (2020)
- "Everybody's Lonely" (2020)
