= Make a Move (Icon for Hire song) =

Single by Icon for Hire

from the album Scripted
- Released: July 5, 2011
- Recorded: 2010
- Genre: Pop punk, hard rock
- Length: 3:03
- Label: Tooth & Nail
- Songwriter: Icon for Hire
- Producers: Rob Hawkins, Aaron Sprinkle

Icon for Hire singles chronology
"Make a Move" (2011)	"Get Well" (2011)

Music video
- "Make a Move" on YouTube

"Make a Move" is a song by American hard rock band Icon for Hire. It is the first single from their debut album Scripted and, following a few months of radio play, was released to iTunes on July 5, 2011. The song peaked at No. 13 on Billboard's Christian Rock chart.

== Composition ==
Like the rest of the album, "Make a Move" mixes a hard rock framework with pop-inspired synthesizers and hooks. Liz Somers of The Denver Post described it as "infectious rock with a hit of pop" and quoted frontwoman Ariel as saying in a press release, "There’s a tension really between heavy rock and pop, but never at the expense where it would overshadow the rock side...The pop part is like the sprinkles on top of a cake, but the actual cake is rich, dark and heavy." Nathaniel Schexnayder of Jesus Freak Hideout said the song contained "impassioned vocals on top of [a] catchy beat and aggressive guitars", and felt it "provides a good reference point for potential buyers who want to get a feel for the group's style."

=== Song meaning ===
David Jeffries of AllMusic interpreted the song as "[challenging] the punk-pop set to trade both angst and apathy for something positive". In an interview, lead singer Ariel explained the song's lyrics: "There are amazing, wonderful, precious people in anguish because they don't have access to food. There are bright-eyed, adorable little girls forced to have sex with strangers for fourteen hours a day, and are drugged up if they fail to perform. And what do I do with information like that? I shrug, think about how sad it is, and hope that somebody will come along and do something about it. ["Make a Move"] brings up the fact that we do so freaking little with all this knowledge. We are selfish. I am selfish."

== Music video ==
The music video was filmed together with the video for the band's second single, "Get Well", during a four-day shoot in Houston with director Van Alan Blumreich. A promotional behind-the-scenes video was released in June before the full video was released via Guitar World magazine's website on August 15, 2011.

The video depicts the band pulling up to an alley at night, where they paint socially critical graffiti on a wall (designs include a priest with dollar signs for eyes, a fast food meal marked with skulls and crossbones, a stick figure mother and child both holding cell phones, a crying woman carrying medical prescription bags, a baby pressing up against a television screen, and a woman wearing a blindfold with "ICON" written on it). This is intercut with footage of the band performing the song in a room decorated with similar graffiti designs, and later at a concert. The graffiti painting is interrupted when a police officer pulls up and starts chasing them down the alleyway. During the chase, guitarist Shawn Jump (playing in the graffiti-decorated room) is briefly seen finishing up a phone call before throwing down the receiver and resuming his playing. The officer finally catches up to Ariel, only to find her surrounded by a large group of teenagers staring defiantly at him. Intimidated, he turns around and runs off.

== Chart performance ==
Chart (2011)	Peak position
U.S. Billboard Christian Rock	13
