= Chrome Neon Jesus =

Studio album by Teenage Wrist
- Released: March 9, 2018
- Genre: Alternative rock; shoegaze; emo; grunge
- Length: 42:52
- Label: Epitaph
- Producer: Carlos de la Garza

Teenage Wrist chronology
Dazed (2015)	Chrome Neon Jesus (2018)	Earth Is a Black Hole (2021)

Singles from Chrome Neon Jesus
- 1. "Stoned, Alone" Released: September 2017

Professional ratings
Review scores
Source	Rating
AllMusic	3.5/5 stars
The Line of Best Fit	8/10
Punknews.org	2.5/5 stars

Chrome Neon Jesus is the first full-length album by the American shoegaze band Teenage Wrist. The album was released on March 9, 2018, through Epitaph Records.

== Track listing ==
All lyrics are written by Anthony Salazar, Marshall Gallagher, and Kamtin Mohager; all music is composed by Teenage Wrist

No.	Title	Length
1.	"Chrome Neon Jesus"	3:43
2.	"Dweeb"	4:23
3.	"Swallow"	3:50
4.	"Stoned, Alone"	3:09
5.	"Supermachine"	3:52
6.	"Black Flamingo"	3:58
7.	"Kibo"	2:37
8.	"Rollerblades"	3:42
9.	"Daylight"	3:47
10.	"Spit"	4:48
11.	"Waitress"	5:03
Total length:		42:52

== Personnel ==
The following individuals were credited for the composition, artwork, and production of the album.

- Brad Blackwood — Mastering
- Kimberly Corday — Art Direction, Photography
- Carlos de la Garza — Engineer, Mixing, Producer
- Marshall Gallagher — Group Member
- Jason Link — Layout
- Kamtin Mohager — Group Member
- Anthony Salazar — Group Member
- Teenage Wrist — Composer, Primary Artist
