= Icon for Hire =

American rock band

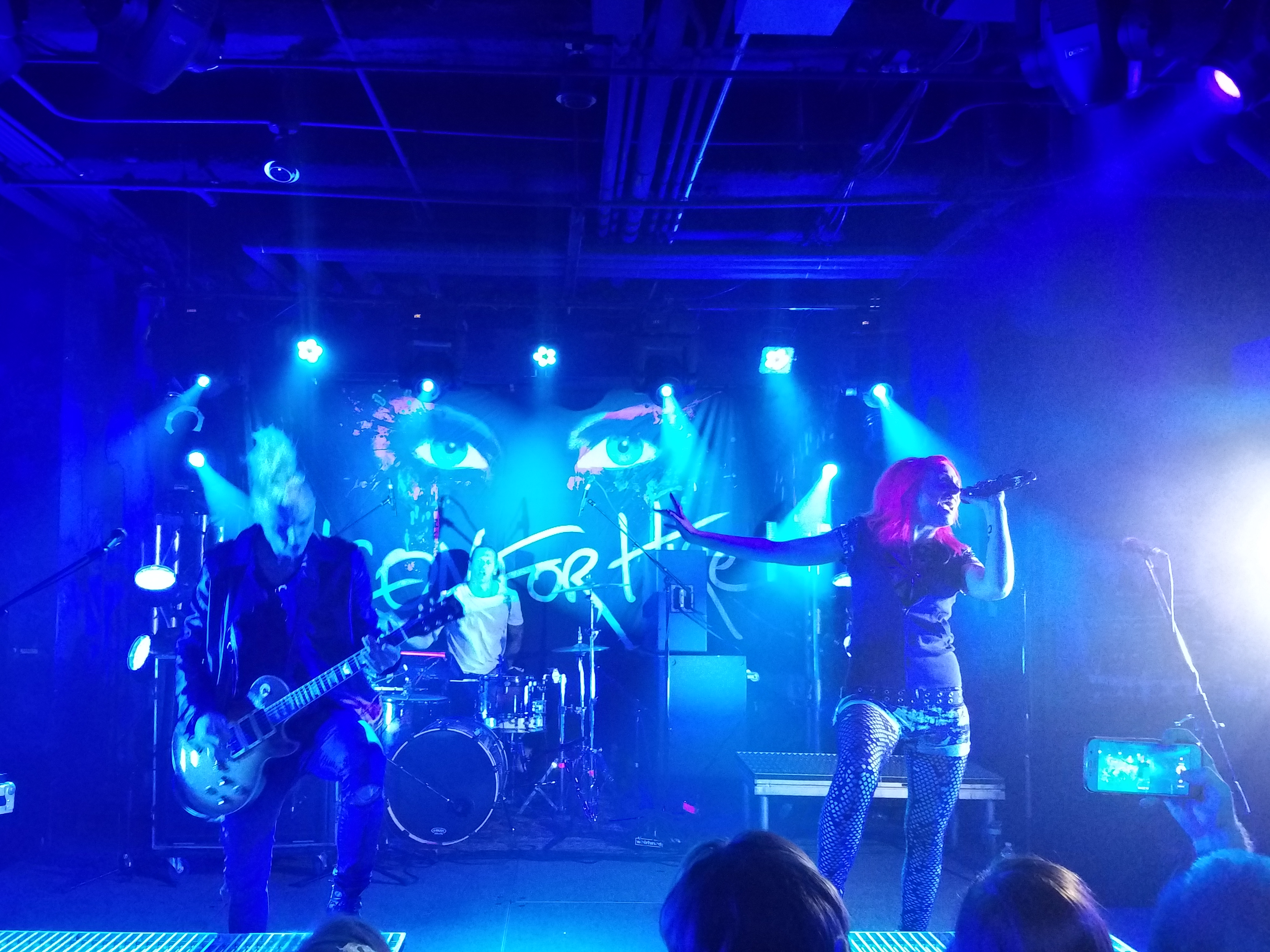
- Icon for Hire live 2016

Background information
- Origin: Decatur, Illinois, U.S.
- Genres: Alternative rock; rap rock; pop punk; punk rock; electronic rock; alternative metal
- Years active: 2007–present
- Label: Tooth & Nail (2009-2015)
- Members: Ariel Bloomer; Shawn Jump
- Past members: Joshua Davis; Adam Kronshagen
- Website: iconforhire.net

Icon for Hire is an American rock band from Decatur, Illinois. Formed in 2007, the band's current lineup consists of singer Ariel Bloomer and lead guitarist Shawn Jump. They released two EPs independently before signing to Tooth & Nail Records, through which they released their first two albums: Scripted in 2011 and Icon for Hire on October 15, 2013. Their third album, You Can't Kill Us, was independently released on November 25, 2016. Their fourth album, Amorphous, was released on February 19, 2021, also independently. Their fifth independent studio album, The Reckoning, was released on September 30, 2022.

== History ==
=== Origins: 2007–2009 ===
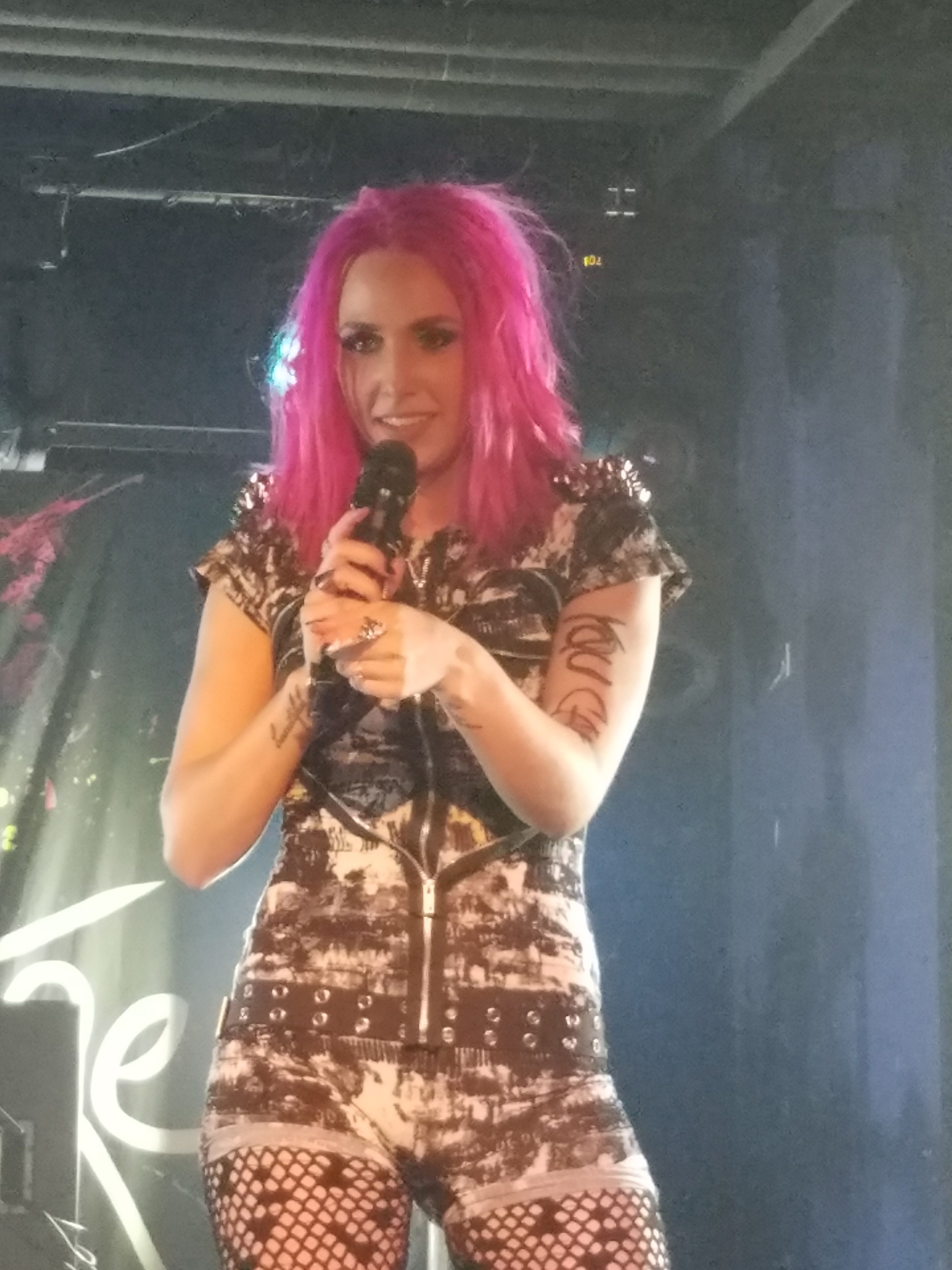
Singer Ariel Bloomer performing in 2016

The band was formed in Decatur, Illinois, by vocalist Ariel Bloomer and guitarist Shawn Jump. When the two met in 2007, Ariel, upon discovering that Jump played guitar, initiated a musical collaboration between the two of them. When the need for a drummer arose, Jump recruited Adam Kronshagen, an old friend he had held jam sessions with as a member of the local party scene (Jump was six months clean at the time). The band officially formed in November of that year, after bassist Joshua Davis joined. They chose their name as a satirical comment on the state of the music industry.

The band played their first show in a local club before an audience of family and friends, who gave them a positive reception. Ariel has been quoted as saying of the performance, "Our passion for music was there; whatever we lacked in sound we made up for with enthusiasm." Over the next two years, the band toured throughout the Midwest and released two EPs, the self-titled Icon for Hire EP in 2008 and The Grey EP in 2009. During that same year, Davis left the band.

=== Tooth & Nail, Scripted and self-titled album: 2009–2015 ===
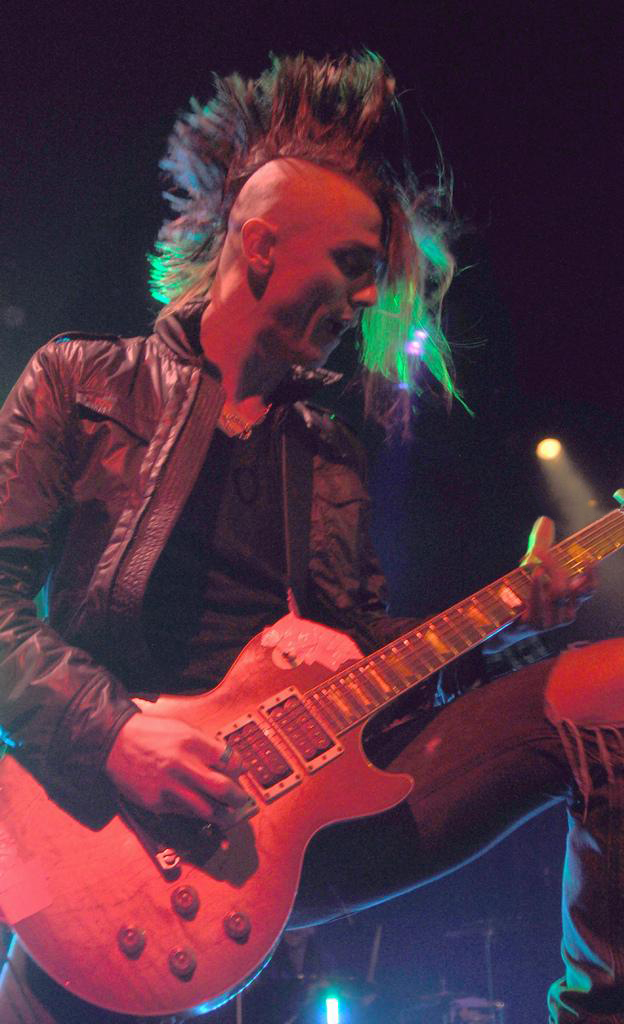
Guitarist Shawn Jump performing in 2011

In late 2009, the band was contacted by Tooth & Nail Records through Myspace. The label then sent representatives to one of the band's shows, and eventually signed them in July 2010. "We are thrilled to be joining such an established and well-respected group at Tooth & Nail," shared the band upon their signing. "It's a label that has a history of consistently putting out good music and really working side by side with their artists. Because we've been doing this thing on our own for over two years, it feels great to partner with Tooth & Nail. We can't wait to record our debut full-length and see where this road takes us." They spent the last quarter of 2010 in the studio with producers Rob Hawkins and Aaron Sprinkle recording their first full-length album, Scripted, which was released by the label on August 23, 2011. The album made it on the US Billboard charts at No. 7 for Hard Rock Albums, No. 5 for Christian Albums, No. 16 for Alternative Albums, No. 22 for Rock Albums, and No. 95 on the Billboard 200. It also sold more than 4,300 units in the first week of release and broke the record for first week sales on a Tooth & Nail debut album. The band also achieved success with the album's lead single "Make a Move", which peaked at No. 13 on R&R/Billboard's Christian Rock chart and had an accompanying music video exclusively released online by Guitar World magazine's website. Also in 2011, the band acquired bassist Josh Kincheloe.

In December 2011, Ariel stated that, while the band had been focusing on extensive touring rather than writing new music, she had "a feeling that we'll start piecing together some demos shortly." In a later interview with TVU Music channel, she revealed that the band was in the early stages of writing songs for a second album. In an interview with KHRT-FM, the band expressed their desire for the album to be "heavier....more aggressive", with more bubblegum pop production and possible hip hop elements. On August 15, 2013, Icon for Hire premiered their new single "Cynics and Critics" via lyric video and announced their second album, the self-titled Icon for Hire. The album was released on October 15, 2013, whereupon it reached No. 66 on the Billboard 200 and received largely positive reviews.

=== Departure from Tooth & Nail and You Can't Kill Us: 2015–2018 ===
On June 6, 2015, Icon for Hire announced that they broke their contract with Tooth & Nail records to go independent, citing creative, ideological, and technical differences with the label. They simultaneously announced that they would soon be releasing new music and released a new song, "Now You Know". "Bam Bam Pop" was also recorded.

On November 20, 2015, the band announced that Adam Kronshagen was leaving the band in order to focus on his family more, and that the band would continue.

On March 15, 2016, the band announced a Kickstarter campaign for their third album, You Can't Kill Us. The album would be released throughout the year, with three new songs released to campaign backers every three months. The band raised $127,200, exceeding their initial goal of $2,016. "Supposed To Be" was released as the lead single from the album among its first group of releases, and received a music video on July 22, 2016, which was directed by Jamie Holt and included fans who donated to their Kickstarter campaign. Lead singer, Ariel, announced the album's release date of November 25. You Can't Kill Us was released on November 25, 2016, and peaked at No. 180 on the Billboard 200 chart.

On October 23, 2018, the band uploaded a video to their YouTube channel titled "Supposed To Be Acoustic Sessions Video Teaser", announcing their first video session to come soon, as well as that the Still Can't Kill Us: The Acoustic Sessions album would be released on December 7. The band released their "Supposed to Be" Acoustic Video on October 26, their "Get Well II" Acoustic Video on November 8, and "Demons" Acoustic Video on November 23. The tracks were also uploaded to Spotify as singles.

=== Amorphous and The Reckoning: 2019–present ===
While the band was on their "Icon Army Tour" in Europe from February to March 2020, the spread of COVID-19 and ensuing pandemic forced them to cancel the remaining shows and return to the United States of America just before the US border closed.

During the "stay at home" period imposed by the band's home-state of Tennessee, Icon for Hire announced they were working on their next album with producer David Thulin, with whom they "merged quarantines with". On September 19, 2020, the band announced the launch of a Kickstarter campaign in order to gather funds to release their next album, titled "Amorphous", with the goal of reaching $2,942. By the end of the campaign on October 24, 2020, the band announced that they surpassed their initial goal and received $263,082 from 3,214 backers, beating their previous Kickstarter campaign by 106.8%.

"Amorphous" was released on February 19, 2021, to mostly positive reviews, including a rating of 3.5 of 5 stars by Cryptic Rock. Following this, a virtual album release show was announced for April 10, 2021, which would be streamed from the Icon for Hire website.

On September 17, 2021, the band published a picture of Ariel, Shawn, and producer David Thulin on their Instagram with a teaser that they have "just finished something pretty special". Several months later on December 8, 2021, they announced the release of "Amorphous Extended Edition", which included one previously unreleased song, three songs that had previously been released as singles, and 6 acoustic versions of songs from the standard "Amorphous" album.

Icon for Hire's 6th studio album, The Reckoning, was launched on September 30, 2022, followed by the announcement of their first European tour since the pandemic, as an opening act for The Rasmus. They also simultaneously released the single "Gatekeepers".

== Touring ==
Icon for Hire supported Red on their "Kill the Machine" tour in October 2011. They also participated in that year's Christmas Rock Night festival in Ennepetal, near Düsseldorf, Germany, along with Red and Skillet. The band toured with Jamie's Elsewhere and These Hearts in early 2012, and toured with Emery's "Emery and Friends Tour" with I Am Empire and Sent By Ravens in March 2012. They have announced a May 2012 tour with P.O.D, Red, and Love and Death.

Icon for Hire toured on LiveNation's "Ones to Watch" tour in 2013 along the side of Redlight King. Later that year, the band kicked off the "Evening With Icon for Hire" tour. The shows featured music, fashion, a pre-concert acoustic set, and an intimate Q&A with the group.

Icon For Hire appeared on all dates of Van's Warped Tour 2014 and the 2015 tour.

In October – November 2016 they were on You Can't Kill Us tour with Stitched Up Heart.

From February to May 2018 the band was on a worldwide Turn Your Pain into Art tour with Riot Child as opening act in Europe.

In October – November 2019 the band went on a US tour with Veridia and Amy Guess.

From February to March 2020 was on the "Icon Army Tour" in Europe, starting in Moscow, Russia, on February 20 and planned to end in Milan with Italian band Halflives as opening act. Due to the spread of COVID-19 in Europe and the announcement of COVID-19 lockdowns in Italy on 9 March 2020, Icon for Hire was forced to cancel their last shows in Zurich, Switzerland (due to happen on March 12, 2020) and Milan (March 13, 2020) and to return to the United States of America.

On April 27, 2022, Icon For Hire announced their headlining "Ready for Combat" tour from June - July 2022 with Sumo Cyco and Awake At Last.

On September 2, 2022, Finnish band The Rasmus announced their "Live and Never Die '22" tour in 21 cities across Europe, citing Icon for Hire as their opening act throughout the tour. This would be the first time Icon for Hire returns to Europe after the COVID-19 pandemic. On October 20, only ten days into the tour, Icon for Hire announced they would be cancelling all remaining shows citing "growing economic concerns in Europe" and "airline misplacement of music gear", resulting in an unexpected and unplanned increase in costs.

Their most recent North American tour, "The Emo Dreams Tour", was announced on 27 July 2023 via a cinematic teaser on their social media accounts. With Icon for Hire headlining the tour, they also had support from the bands Conquer Divide, The Funeral Portrait, and Concrete Castles in select locations. The tour ran from September to October 2023.

== Musical style and influences ==
The band's sound combines pop punk and alternative metal elements with strings and electronics. Jamie Maxwell of Cross Rhythms describes them as a punk band, but notes that "the electronic influence evident in some of their tracks is a definite nod to the likes of Linkin Park and others in the nu metal mould." In describing the band's sound, lead singer Ariel has said that the band is "first and foremost just a rock band. That's where our roots are and where our hearts are. But a few years ago we started really getting into synths and programming. We love the combination of brutal, in-your-face riffs, with the fun candy of pop production sprinkled all over it."

Influences cited by the band have included hard rock bands like Linkin Park, Breaking Benjamin, Pantera, Mötley Crüe, and Rage Against the Machine, as well as pop- and hip hop-oriented artists such as Skrillex, The Black Eyed Peas, Dessa, and Lady Gaga.

=== Comparisons to other rock bands ===
The band's sound has often been compared to that of other female-fronted rock bands, particularly Paramore. Nathaniel Schexnayder of Jesus Freak Hideout went so far as to label the band's debut album Scripted as generic, saying that the band "borrows their elements from other female fronted acts like Flyleaf, Fireflight, and Paramore at an alarming degree." Ariel has taken issue with these comparisons, citing the band's "unique combination of programming/pop elements, mixed with a commercial rock sound" as a distinguishing element, in addition to the band's live performances: "We've never had someone come see us live and compare us to other bands." She has also noted such comparisons as unfairly discriminatory: "It frustrates me how in so many other industries you are acknowledged for your skill and education, but in music somehow if you're a chick you better be bringing something extraordinarily mind-blowing to the table in order to have a shot. It's a bit sexist I think." Their song "Now You Know" addresses the subject at length.

== Religious affiliation ==
Icon for Hire have had complicated relations with the Christian music market as they are not categorized as a Christian band. Ariel stated that they do not play music for Christians but to "save the world" and that they try to distance themselves from identifying as part of the Christian music industry to avoid pushing non-Christians away from hearing that message. Despite this, several writers have identified Icon for Hire as part of the Christian music scene, and some critics have noted references to the members' Christian faith in their lyrics. David Jeffries pointed out that "Christian ideals are the driving force" in the lyrics on Scripted, though he acknowledged that "you could look at this as a secular rebellion against the mopey 'scene' bands and still thrill at Icon for Hire's fresh attitude and sense of purpose." Schexnayder, while admitting that "the group doesn't wear their faith on their sleeve in their messages", noted a general encouraging message on the album and singled out the song "The Grey" as containing "spiritual references". Kim Jones of About.com said that the categorization was inaccurate "if you're looking to use the term to put them into a nice and safe box, limited to only a Christian audience."

== Band members ==
Current

- Ariel Bloomer – vocals (2007–present).
- Shawn Jump – guitars, keyboards, backing vocals (2007–present)

Former

- Joshua Davis – bass, unclean vocals (2007–2009)
- Adam Kronshagen – drums (2007–2015, 2016)
- Josh Kincheloe – bass, backing vocals (2013–2016; touring musician 2011–2013)

Touring

- Shane Wise – drums (2016)
- Ryan Seaman – drums (2017–2018)

== Discography ==
=== Studio albums ===
Title	Album details	Peak chart positions					Sales
Title	Album details	US	US Rock	US Alt.	US Christ.	US Indie	Sales
Scripted	Release: August 23, 2011; Label: Tooth & Nail; Formats: CD, digital download	95	22	16	5	—	US: 4,300 (first week)
Icon for Hire	Release: October 15, 2013; Label: Tooth & Nail; Formats: CD, digital download	66	20	16	4	11	
You Can't Kill Us	Release: November 25, 2016; Label: Independent; Formats: CD, digital download	180	16	10	—	9	
Still Can't Kill Us: Acoustic Sessions	Release: December 7, 2018; Label: Independent; Formats: CD, digital download	—	—	—	—	—	
Amorphous	Release: February 19, 2021; Label: Independent; Formats: CD, digital download	—	—	—	—	—	
The Reckoning	Release: September 30, 2022; Label: Independent; Formats: CD, digital download	—	—	—	—	—	

=== Extended plays ===
Title	Songs	Album details
Icon For Hire EP	"Off With Her Head" "Pernilla" "Call Me Alive"	Release: 2008; Label: Independent; Formats: CD
The Grey EP	"Carried Away" "Fall Apart" "The Grey"	Release: 2009; Label: Independent; Formats: CD
Now You Know EP	"Now You Know" "Bam Bam Pop"	Release: July 27, 2015; Label: Independent; Formats: CD (Limited Edition)

=== Singles ===
List of singles, with selected chart positions, showing year released and album name
Title	Year	Peak chart positions	Album
Title	Year	US Christ. Rock	Album
"Make a Move"	2011	13	Scripted
"Get Well"	2011	—	Scripted
"Off with Her Head"	2011	—	Scripted
"Cynics & Critics"	2013	21	Icon For Hire
"Sugar & Spice"	2013	—	Icon For Hire
"Now You Know"	2015	—	Now You Know EP
"Supposed to Be"	2016	—	You Can't Kill Us
"You Can't Kill Us"	2017	—	You Can't Kill Us
"Demons"	2017	—	You Can't Kill Us
"Supposed to Be"	2018	—	Still Can't Kill Us: Acoustic Sessions
"Get Well II"	2018	—	Still Can't Kill Us: Acoustic Sessions
"Demons"	2018	—	Still Can't Kill Us: Acoustic Sessions
"Venom"	2019	—	Amorphous
"Hollow"	2019	—	Amorphous
"Blindside"	2019	—	Amorphous
"Curse or Cure"	2020	—	Amorphous
"Seeds"	2020	—	Amorphous
"Last One Standing"	2020	—	Amorphous
"Waste My Hate"	2021	—	Amorphous
"Ready for Combat"	2022	—	The Reckoning
"Dismantled"	2022	—	The Reckoning
"Breakdown"	2022	—	The Reckoning
"Shadow"	2022	—	The Reckoning
"Gatekeepers"	2022	—	The Reckoning

=== As Featured Artist ===
Year	Title
2024	"Victim or Survivor" (Citizen Soldier feat. Icon for Hire)
2024	"Light Up the Sky" (Thousand Foot Krutch feat. Icon for Hire)

=== Promotional singles ===
Year	Title	Album
2013	"Fight"	Scripted
2013	"The Grey"	Scripted
2013	"Counting on Hearts"	Icon for Hire
2013	"Sorry About Your Parents"	Icon for Hire
2015	"Bam Bam Pop"	Now You Know EP
2016	"Here We Are"	You Can't Kill Us
2016	"You Were Wrong"	You Can't Kill Us
2016	"Get Well II"	You Can't Kill Us
2016	"Happy Hurts"	You Can't Kill Us
2016	"Pulse"	You Can't Kill Us
2016	"The Magic"	You Can't Kill Us
2016	"Under the Knife"	You Can't Kill Us

=== Music videos ===
Year	Song	Director
2011	"Make a Move"	Van Alan Blumreich
2011	"Get Well"	Van Alan Blumreich
2012	"Off with Her Head"	Daniel Quinones
2016	"Now You Know"	Jamie Holt
2016	"Supposed To Be"	Jamie Holt
2017	"Demons"	Graham Fielder
2019	"Hollow"	Ryan Hamblin
2020	"Curse or Cure"	
2020	"Seeds"	
2021	"Last One Standing"	
2021	"Waste My Hate"	
2021	"Brittle"	
2022	"Ready for Combat"	
2022	"Dismantled"	
2022	"Breakdown"	
2022	"Shadow"	
2022	"Gatekeepers"	

=== Compilation contributions ===
Year	Compilation	Label	Song
2011	Tooth & Nail Records Summer Sampler 2011	Tooth & Nail Records	"Make a Move"
2011	Now Hear This! 7.0	Sparrow Records	"Make a Move"
2011	A Very Tooth & Nail Christmas Sampler	Tooth & Nail Records	"Make a Move"

Non-album songs

- "Conversation with a Rockstar"
- "Sno"
- "Perfect Storm" later released as "War"
- "One Million Ways"
