= Patrice Murciano =

French artist (born 1969)

Patrice Murciano (born 27 May 1969) is a French painter, sculptor, photographer, graphic and fashion designer.

He is known for his collaboration with fashion designer Jean Paul Gaultier in 2013, who included his portrait painted by Murciano in his fashion show.

== Biography ==
Patrice Murciano was born on 27 May 27, 1969, in Belfort, France. He moved to Montpellier at a young age and began his autodidactic journey by age six.

== Selected exhibitions ==
- 1998 to 2010
  - Reza Namazi Gallery, New York City, 1998
  - St-Germain Gallery, Los Angeles, 2004
  - Osaka
  - Paris
  - Montpellier
- 2011
  - Galerie AUDRAS (Etoile)
  - Galerie CREA4 (Moulins)
  - Musée Art contemporain de Bahia (Brazil)
- 2012
  - Galerie Hoche (Versailles, France)
- 2013
  - Galerie Bruxelles (Belgium)
  - Galerie Hillier (England)
  - Galerie Kurves (Montpellier, France)
  - Casino Partouche (La Grande Motte, France)
  - Le Mas des filles (Montpellier, France)
  - L’insensé (Montpellier, France)

== See also ==
- List of French artists
- List of graphic designers
