= Heaven (Softcult EP) =

EP by Softcult
- Released: May 24, 2024
- Recorded: 2023
- Label: Easy Life
- Producer: Phoenix Arn-Horn

Softcult chronology
See You in the Dark (2023)	Heaven (2024)

Singles from Heaven
- 1. "Haunt You Still" Released: November 10, 2023; 2. "Heaven" Released: December 12, 2023; 3. "Shortest Fuse" Released: January 30, 2024; 4. "Spiralling Out" Released: March 21, 2024

Professional ratings
Review scores
Source	Rating
Louder Sound	4/5 stars

Heaven is the fourth extended play by Canadian grunge duo Softcult, released on May 24, 2024, through Easy Life Records.

== Track listing ==
No.	Title	Length
1.	"Haunt You Still"	4:02
2.	"One of the Pack"	3:18
3.	"Spiralling Out"	3:44
4.	"9 Circles"	4:01
5.	"Shortest Fuse"	3:40
6.	"Heaven"	4:01
