= Earth Is a Black Hole =

Studio album by Teenage Wrist
- Released: February 12, 2021
- Recorded: December 2019 – June 2020
- Genres: Alternative rock; grunge; shoegaze
- Length: 47:06
- Label: Epitaph

Teenage Wrist chronology
Chrome Neon Jesus (2018)	Earth Is a Black Hole (2021)	Still Love (2023)

Singles from Earth is a Black Hole
- 1. "Silverspoon" Released: August 12, 2020; 2. "Earth Is a Black Hole" Released: October 28, 2020; 3. "Taste of Gasoline" Released: December 2, 2020; 4. "Yellowbelly" Released: January 12, 2021

Earth Is a Black Hole is the second studio album by American alternative rock band, Teenage Wrist. The album was released on February 12, 2021, through Epitaph Records.

== Track listing ==
All music is composed by Teenage Wrist.

Earth Is a Black Hole track listing
No.	Title	Length
1.	"Squeeze (Intro)"	1:22
2.	"Taste of Gasoline"	2:46
3.	"New Emotion"	3:26
4.	"Yellowbelly"	3:14
5.	"Silverspoon"	3:42
6.	"Wear U Down"	2:55
7.	"High Again"	3:26
8.	"Wasting Time"	3:40
9.	"Earth Is a Black Hole"	2:55
10.	"Stella"	4:40
Total length:		32:12

== Critical reception ==
Professional ratings
Review scores
Source	Rating
Kerrang!	3/5 stars
PopMatters	7/10
Spectrum Culture	55%
Sputnikmusic	3.5/5
Upset	3/5 stars

Earth Is a Black Hole received mixed critic reviews. Mischa Pearlman, writing for Kerrang! gave Earth Is a Black Hole three stars out of five calling the album an "incohesive record", although conceding that it is worthy of repeat listens. Thomas Stremfel, writing for Spectrum Culture said the album is "longing for something more", but said that the second half of the album "explodes with one of the catchiest choruses of the year". Ultimately though, Stremfel felt that Earth Is a Black Hole "doesn't go as far as it could have. Safe production and uninspired performances keep it from standing out much in the rock landscape".

== Personnel ==
Music

- Marshall Gallagher – vocals, guitars, bass
- Anthony Salazar – drums, vocals, percussion
- Chase Barham – additional guitars
- Maron Ryan – additional vocals
- Erica Silva – additional vocals
- Jacob Wick – additional vocals

Production

- Colin Brittain – production and mixing
- Kevin McCombs — engineering
- Ted Jensen — mastering

Artwork and marketing

- Colin Crane — album artwork
- Jason Link — layout
- Lindsey Nico Mann – photography
- Chris Foitel — A&R
- Matt McGreevey – marketing
