= Sleepwalking (The Chain Gang of 1974 song) =

Single by The Chain Gang of 1974

from the album Daydream Forever
- Released: March 18, 2014
- Recorded: 2012–13
- Studio: Malibu and Los Angeles, California
- Genre: Indietronica; synth-pop
- Length: 3:37
- Label: Warner Bros.
- Songwriters: James Nick Bailey; Rami Jrade; Kamtin Mohager; Ryan Ogren
- Producer: Kamtin Mohager

The Chain Gang of 1974 singles chronology
"Miko" (2013)	"Sleepwalking" (2014)

Music video
- "Sleepwalking" on YouTube

"Sleepwalking" is a song by American electronic rock group The Chain Gang of 1974. It was written by the group's frontman Kamtin Mohager along with James Bailey, Rami Jrade and Ryan Ogren. The song was originally recorded by Mohager for his third studio album, Daydream Forever, where it appears as the third track. "Sleepwalking" was first released as a remixed version of the Daydream Forever track, included on the 2013 soundtrack-compilation album The Music of Grand Theft Auto V, where it appeared as the closing track on the first "volume" of the album.

A "Sleepwalking" promotional single, featuring the Daydream Forever track of the same name, was released by Warner Bros. Records to US Modern rock radio on February 4, 2014, serving as the second release by Mohager in promotion of Daydream Forever, following the 2013 single, "Miko". A later "Sleepwalking" single was released in the United States by Warner Bros. on March 18, 2014. The three-track single features "Sleepwalking" and acoustic "Daydreamer" versions of Daydream Forever tracks "You" and "Sleepwalking".

== Usage in media ==
In addition to featuring on The Music of Grand Theft Auto V, the track was used in-game and in promotional media for Rockstar North's 2013 action-adventure game Grand Theft Auto V. The track was used in the official trailer for the game, and in various television commercials and spots promoting the game.

== Music video ==
A music video for the song was released on the bands' official YouTube channel on April 16, 2014.

== Track listing ==
Digital download
No.	Title	Writer(s)	Producer(s)	Length
1.	"Sleepwalking"	James Bailey; Rami Jrade; Kamtin Mohager; Ryan Ogren	Kamtin Mohager	3:37
2.	"You" (Daydreamer version)	Isom Innis; Kamtin Mohager	Mohager	3:52
3.	"Sleepwalking" (Daydreamer version)	Bailey; Jrade; Mohager	Mohager	3:30
Total length:				10:59

US promotional single
No.	Title	Writer(s)	Producer(s)	Length
1.	"Sleepwalking"	Bailey; Jrade; Mohager; Ogren	Mohager	3:37

== Personnel ==
Adapted from Daydream Forever liner notes.

The Chain Gang of 1974

- Kamtin Mohager – vocals, music, production

== Charts and accolades ==
=== Weekly charts ===
Chart (2013)	Peak position
France (SNEP)	195
UK Singles (Official Charts)	85

=== Accolades ===
Year	Ceremony	Award	Result
2013	Spike VGX Awards	Best Song in a Game	Nominated

== Release history ==
=== Commercial ===
Country	Date	Format	Label
United States	March 18, 2014	Digital download	Warner Bros. Records

=== Promotional ===
Country	Date	Radio Format	Label
United States	February 4, 2014	Modern rock / Alternative radio	Warner Bros. Records
