= Softcult =

Canadian grunge duo

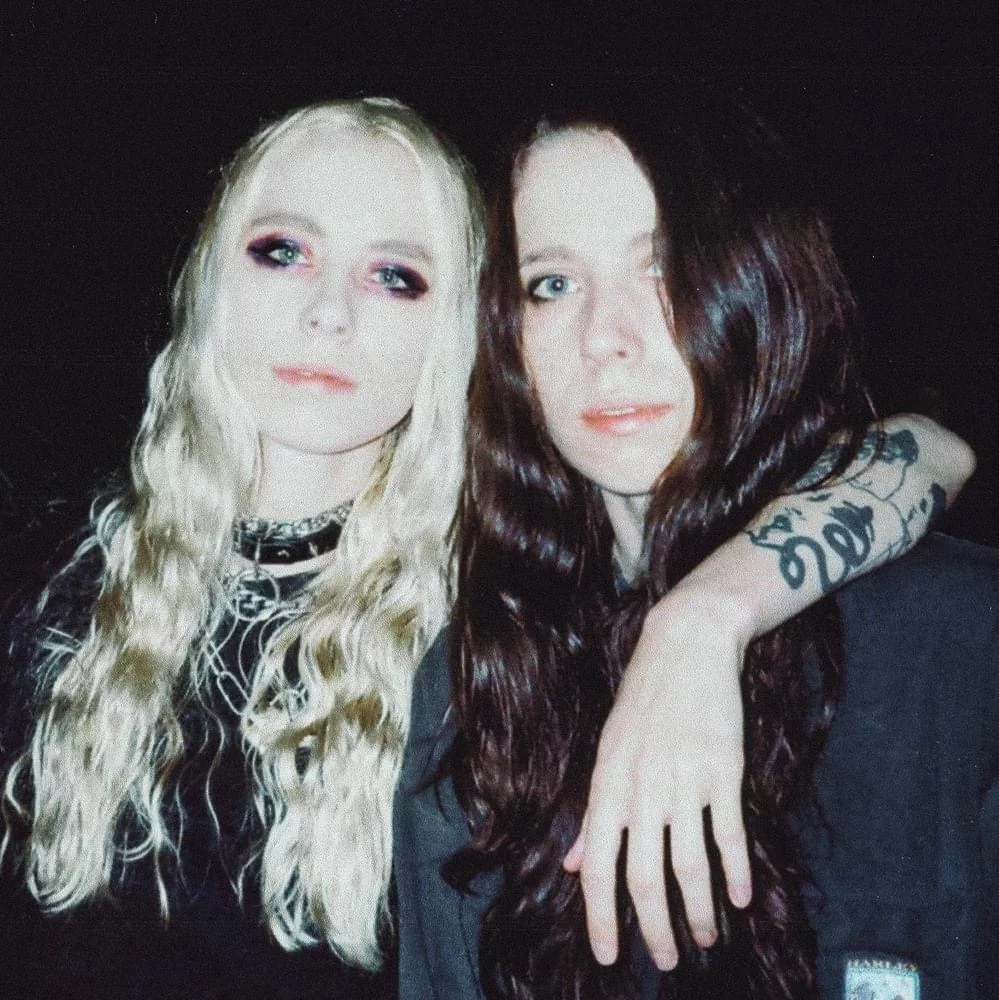

Background information
- Origin: Kitchener, Ontario, Canada
- Genres: Grunge; alternative rock; lo-fi; shoegaze; riot grrrl
- Years active: 2020–present
- Label: Easy Life
- Spinoff of: Courage My Love
- Members: Phoenix Arn-Horn; Mercedes Arn-Horn
- Website: softcult.band

Softcult is a Canadian grunge duo consisting of twin siblings Phoenix and Mercedes Arn-Horn. (Note: Phoenix uses they/them pronouns, and Mercedes uses she/they pronouns.) The duo are known for their melding of grunge with shoegaze, as well as their DIY and riot grrrl-inspired ethics. The band's debut album, When a Flower Doesn't Grow, was released on January 30, 2026.

== History ==
Twin siblings Phoenix and Mercedes Arn-Horn (born 1994) grew up in Toronto, Ontario, and were home-schooled by their mother, an English teacher. Prior to forming Softcult, the Arn-Horn siblings were members of the pop-punk band Courage My Love, which released several EPs and two studio albums throughout the 2010s. Feeling creatively stifled by their record label, the Arn-Horn siblings decided to disband Courage My Love and begin a new project together in the summer of 2020. The band chose the name Softcult, which Mercedes Arn-Horn defined as "anything that you don’t really question where you follow your group of people", to represent the band's "social commentary". The band's debut single, "Another Bish", was released on January 15, 2021.

On April 16, 2021, Softcult released their first EP, Year of the Rat, through Easy Life Records. The duo's second EP, Year of the Snake, "encompasses our feelings towards the cutthroat capitalist society we live in and the problems that need to be addressed". One of the EP's songs, "B.W.B.B.", was written in response to the murder of Sarah Everard in March 2021. Their third EP, See You in the Dark, was released on March 24, 2023, and was inspired by My Bloody Valentine and the Cocteau Twins. The EP received a Juno Award nomination for Alternative Album of the Year award at the Juno Awards of 2024. On May 24, 2024, the band released their fourth EP, Heaven.

On April 25, 2025, the band released the single "Pill to Swallow" ahead of their first full-length album, When a Flower Doesn't Grow.

== Musical style and influences ==
Softcult have been described as grunge, alternative rock, lo-fi and shoegaze. The Arn-Horn siblings were inspired by the 1990s riot grrrl culture, and have cited Bikini Kill, Bratmobile and Pussy Riot as formative influences on the band. They cited My Bloody Valentine's Loveless (1991), Slowdive's Souvlaki (1993), Swervedriver's Mezcal Head (1993) and Deftones' White Pony (2000) as influences on their fourth EP Heaven.

Since February 2021, Softcult has published a monthly zine, SCripture. which discusses environmental, social and political issues. The zine was directly inspired by 1990s riot grrrl culture, and features a black-and-white aesthetic inspired by Raymond Pettibon. Phoenix says that the zine "kind of [reinforces] the message behind [their] songs."

== Band members ==
- Mercedes Arn-Horn – vocals, guitar
- Phoenix Arn-Horn – vocals, drums, production

Touring members

- Brent McSwiggan – lead guitar (2022–present)
- Phil Hirst – bass (2023–present)
- Oliver Burdett – bass (2022–2023)

== Discography ==
=== Studio albums ===
| Title | Details |
|---|---|
| When a Flower Doesn't Grow | Releasing: January 30, 2026; Label: Easy Life; Format: LP, CD |

=== Compilation albums ===
| Title | Details |
|---|---|
| Zodiac EPs | Released: September 30, 2022; Label: Easy Life; Format: LP, CD |
| Dark Zodiac | Released: May 12, 2023 (Japan exclusive); Label: Hands and Moment; Format: CD |

=== Live albums ===
| Title | Details |
|---|---|
| Softcult on Audiotree Live | Released: September 5, 2023; Label: Audiotree; Format: DD |

=== EPs ===
| Title | Album details |
|---|---|
| Year of the Rat | Released: April 16, 2021; Label: Easy Life; Format: CS, DD |
| Year of the Snake | Released: February 4, 2022; Label: Easy Life; Format: CS, DD |
| See You in the Dark | Released: March 24, 2023; Label: Easy Life; Format: CD, CS, DD |
| Heaven | Released: May 24, 2024; Label: Easy Life; Format: CD, CS, DD |

=== Singles ===
| Title | Year | Album |
|---|---|---|
| "Another Bish" | 2021 | Year of the Rat |
| "Gloomy Girl" | 2021 | Year of the Rat |
| "Spit it Out" | 2021 | Year of the Snake |
| "House of Mirrors" | 2021 | Year of the Snake |
| "BWBB" | 2021 | Year of the Snake |
| "Perfect Blue" | 2021 | Year of the Snake |
| "Gaslight" | 2022 | Year of the Snake |
| "Uzumaki" | 2022 | Year of the Snake |
| "Been a Son" | 2022 | Non-album single |
| "Frances Farmer Will Have Her Revenge on Seattle" | 2022 | Non-album single |
| "One of a Million | 2022 | See You in the Dark |
| "Drain" | 2022 | See You in the Dark |
| "Someone2Me" | 2022 | See You in the Dark |
| "Dress" | 2023 | See You in the Dark |
| "Love Song" | 2023 | See You in the Dark |
| "Spoiled" | 2023 | See You in the Dark |
| "Haunt You Still" | 2023 | Heaven |
| "Heaven" | 2023 | Heaven |
| "Shortest Fuse" | 2024 | Heaven |
| "Spiralling Out" | 2024 | Heaven |
| "Pill to Swallow" | 2025 | When a Flower Doesn't Grow |
| "Naive" | 2025 | When a Flower Doesn't Grow |
| "16/25" | 2025 | When a Flower Doesn't Grow |
| "She Said, He Said" | 2025 | When a Flower Doesn't Grow |
| "Queen of Nothing" | 2025 | When a Flower Doesn't Grow |
