= Teenage Wrist =

American rock band

- Origin: Los Angeles, California, United States
- Genres: Alternative rock; grungegaze; soft grunge; shoegaze
- Years active: 2014–present
- Label: Epitaph
- Members: Anthony Salazar; Marshall Gallagher
- Past members: Kamtin Mohager; Chase Barham
- Website: teenagewrist.com

Teenage Wrist is an American rock band from Los Angeles, California.

== History ==
The band was formed in 2014 by vocalist and bass guitarist Kamtin Mohager, lead guitarist and vocalist Marshall Gallagher, and drummer Anthony Salazar. Inspired by alternative rock and grunge music of the 1990s, the group wrote and recorded their debut extended play (EP), Dazed, released in 2015 on Pale Wave. The following year, the band released Live at Noise Coalition before signing to Epitaph Records and releasing their debut album, Chrome Neon Jesus, in 2018. With the inclusion of guitarist Chase Barham, the quartet toured as support for bands such as Thrice, Citizen, and Pianos Become the Teeth, as well as performing at festivals such as Reading & Leeds and Sound and Fury.

In 2019, the band released the three-track EP, Counting Flies. After tours with Basement and Manchester Orchestra, Mohager announced that he had departed from the band in 2019 due to creative differences. Barham left the group in 2020, leaving Teenage Wrist as a duo between Gallagher and Salazar. In August 2020, the band released their first single as a duo, "Silverspoon", and later released their second album, Earth is a Black Hole, in February 2021. In support of the album, the group toured with Movements, Badflower, and 311.

In 2023, the band released their third album, Still Love, and embarked on a headlining tour with support from Heavenward, Slow Joy, and Spiritual Cramp.

== Influences ==
Teenage Wrist have cited influences including Turnover, the Menzingers, the Smashing Pumpkins, the Cure, Third Eye Blind, Tom Petty, Dave Matthews Band, Nirvana, Rush, Third Eye Blind George Clanton, Basement, Sunny Day Real Estate, White Reaper, Deftones, Korn, Fear Before, Radiohead, Fontaines D.C. and 311.

== Members ==
Current members

- Anthony Salazar – drums (2014–present)
- Marshall Gallagher – guitar, vocals (2014–present)

Past members

- Kamtin Mohager – bass guitar, vocals (2014–2019)
- Chase Barham – guitar (2018–2020)

Current touring members

- Jordan Kulp – guitar (2022–present)
- Jose Trujillo – bass (2022–present)

Former touring members

- McCoy Kirgo – guitar (2021–2022)
- Matt Cohen – bass (2021–2022)
- Jacob Evergreen – guitar (2021)

== Discography ==
=== Studio albums ===
- Chrome Neon Jesus (Epitaph, 2018)
- Earth Is a Black Hole (Epitaph, 2021)
- Still Love (Epitaph, 2023)

=== Live albums ===
- Earth Is a Black Hole (Live at Kingsize) (Epitaph, 2021)

=== EPs ===
- Dazed (Pale Wave, 2015)
- Live at Noise Coalition (Pale Wave, 2016)
- Part Time Punks (Epitaph, 2018)
- Counting Flies (Epitaph, 2019)
- Live at Maida Vale (BBC) (Epitaph, 2024)
- A Different Shine (Epitaph, 2026)

=== Singles ===
- "Afterglow" (2015)
- "Slide Away" (2015)
- "Stoned, Alone" (2016)
- "Swallow" (2017)
- "Dweeb" (2018)
- "Supermachine" (2018)
- "Silverspoon" (2020)
- "Earth Is a Black Hole" (2020)
- "Taste of Gasoline" (2020)
- "Yellowbelly" (2021)
- "Is It Really You?" (with Loathe) (2022)
- "Sunshine" (2023)
- "Diorama" (2023)
- "Still Love" (feat. Softcult) (2023)
- "Dark Sky" (feat. S.A. Martinez) (2023)
