= The Chain Gang of 1974 =

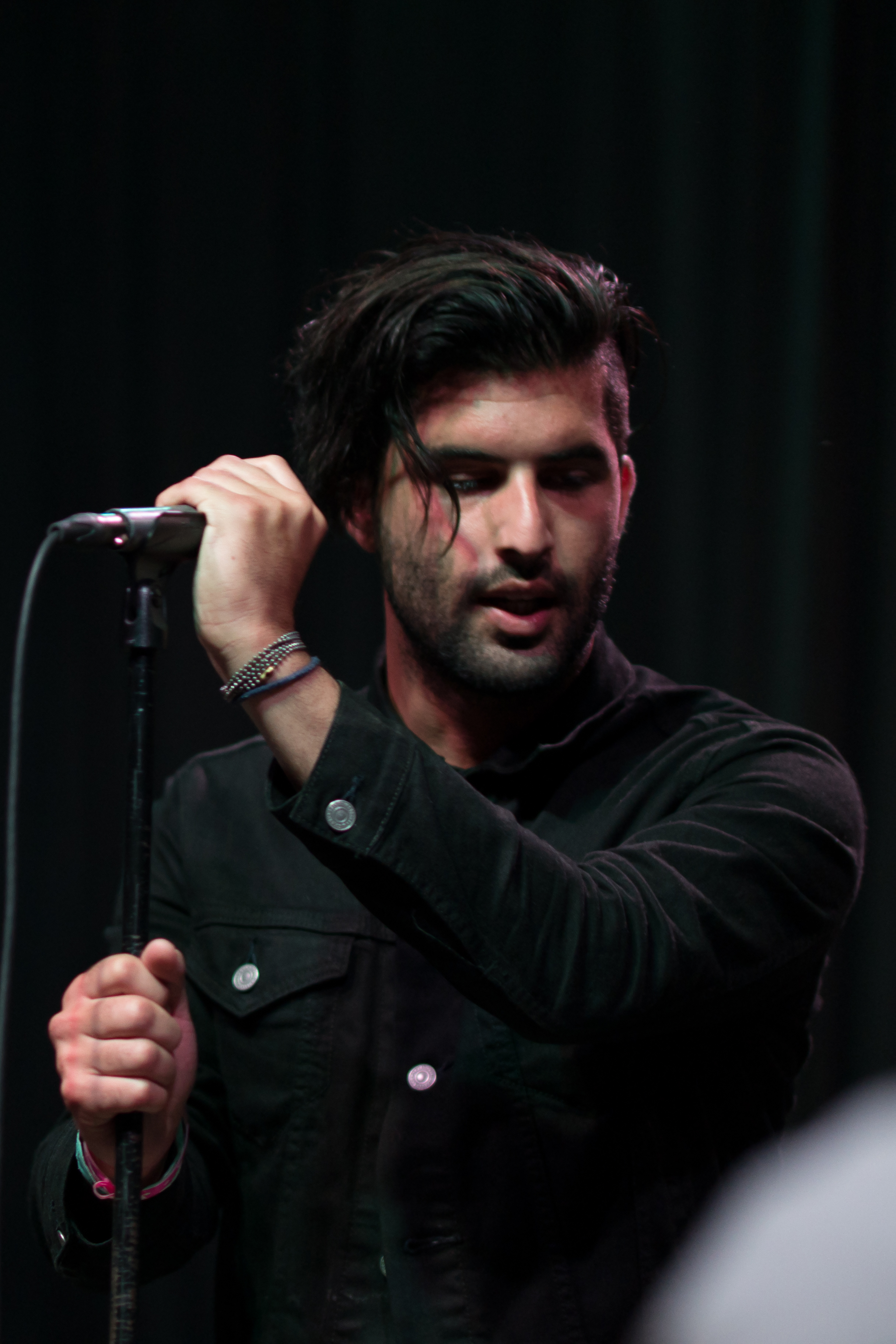
- Mohager performing as Chain Gang of 1974 in 2014

Background information
- Also known as: The Chain Gang of 1974; Chain Gang of 1974; Kam
- Born: Kamtin Karimi Mohager; July 31, 1985 (age 41); San Jose, California, US
- Genres: Synth-pop; indie pop; electronic rock; post-punk; indie electronic; electro-pop; EDM; alternative rock; alternative dance; grunge; shoegaze; punk rock; emo
- Occupations: Musician; songwriter; composer; graphic designer
- Years active: 2007–present
- Labels: Fever Ltd.; Caroline; Warner
- Member of: Heavenward
- Formerly of: Teenage Wrist

Kamtin Mohager (/ˈkɒmtiːn/) is an American singer, songwriter, musician, record producer, and graphic designer born in San Jose, California. Raised in Hawaii, and later Colorado, Mohager began pursuing punk rock music in his teenage years. Later inspired by shoegaze and alternative rock bands from the 1990s, he formed the indie electronic project The Chain Gang of 1974. He has released five studio albums, White Guts (2010), Wayward Fire (2011), Daydream Forever (2014), Felt (2017), and Honey Moon Drips (2020). His 2014 single "Sleepwalking" gained popularity for featuring on the video game Grand Theft Auto V (2013) and its accompanying soundtrack.

In 2014, Mohager became the bass guitarist and vocalist for American rock band Teenage Wrist, releasing three EPs and their debut studio album, Chrome Neon Jesus (2018), before departing in 2019. In 2020, he founded the grunge project Heavenward, having released one EP, Staircase Music (2022), and one full-length studio album, Pyrophonics (2023). He has collaborated with numerous other bands and musicians such as The Naked and Famous, Dillon Francis, Jai Wolf, and Flux Pavilion. Mohager launched the indie record label Fever Ltd. in 2010.

== History ==
Kamtin Mohager was born in San Jose, California to immigrant parents from Iran. He was raised alongside his three brothers between California, Hawaii, and Colorado. He joined 3OH!3 as a touring bassist from 2008 through 2010. He self-released Fantastic Nostalgic: The Early Recordings in 2010. That year also saw the release of his full-length debut, White Guts. Mohager moved to Los Angeles to record the follow-up album, Wayward Fire, which was released on Modern Art Records in 2011.

In early 2010, Mohager combined both early EP's into a digital-only release titled 'Fantastic Nostalgic: The Early Recordings. Mohager describes his early sound as "all over the place, from a piano ballad to songs that sound like Black Rebel Motorcycle Club, Primal Scream, or Justice." Zachary Houle of PopMatters likened Wayward Fire to the work of synth-pop bands such as New Order and OMD, calling it "an homage to the '80s, in particular, the soundtracks to John Hughes films, and it is, in a word, fun." Pitchfork Media's Ian Cohen remarked that it "ends up less like a living celebration of the past and more like a display case of your favorite synth-pop action figures in their original packaging." David Marchese of Spin wrote that the album "swoons and grooves deliciously, but the lyrics have a distinctly processed flavor". Max Blau of Paste called it "one of the better and most cohesive electronic albums" of 2011. AllMusic's William Ruhlmann said: "Mohager convincingly makes the case that there is more to say in the music of the '80s, even if fashion has banished it to its own radio formats and nostalgia tours." Justin Gerber of Consequence of Sound found flaws in the lyrics and suggested that "just about every song could be cut by about a minute", but added that "nearly every song has a beat that pummels you into submission, and that is most definitely a compliment."

In 2012, Mohager signed to Warner Music Group for the release of his third full-length album, Daydream Forever. The album is described as a continuation of the synth-heavy, reverb-laden dreams that made Mohager's debut album, Wayward Fire, an immediate favorite of the retro set.

In 2013, Mohager received worldwide recognition when his song “Sleepwalking” was featured on the soundtrack of Grand Theft Auto V, as well as on the game's official trailer.

In summer 2014, Mohager teamed up with DJ/producer Dillon Francis, as well as Sultan & Ned Shepard for the release of "When We Were Young".

In early 2015, Mohager launched a collaborative side project with Marshall Gallagher of Swing Hero titled Teenage Wrist. The band's debut single "Afterglow" received praise from My Chemical Romance frontman Gerard Way.

=== 2016–2018: Felt ===
On September 9, 2016, The Chain Gang of 1974 released his single "I Still Wonder". On March 26, 2017, The Chain Gang of 1974 announced the release of his new album, Felt, which was released on June 23 through Caroline Records.

In March 2018, Teenage Wrist released their debut album, Chrome Neon Jesus. Mohager would eventually depart the project in late 2019.

=== 2019–present: Pollen, Honey Moon Drips, and Heavenward ===
On February 15, 2019, The Chain Gang of 1974 released the single “Burn Out” along with the announcement that he would be releasing one single per month throughout 2019. Then, on March 22, 2019, Mohager released “Heaven”, produced by Chadwick Johnson of the band Hundredth. The next month on April 26 followed the release of the third single, “Such A Shame.” Mohager later stated on Twitter that the track was inspired by Jimmy Eat World. On May 24, The Chain Gang of 1974 released the fourth single “Ordinary Fools, Pt. 2”, the follow up to the Daydream Forever opening track “Ordinary Fools”. On June 21, Mohager released the track “YDLMA” (You Don't Love Me Anymore). The next month on July 26 saw the release Of “From Here Who Knows”. This was the last monthly single, and there was not another single in August. Instead of releasing a single in August, Mohager instead announces an upcoming EP entitled “Pollen”. The album would consist of the earlier singles “Heaven”, “Burn Out”, and “Ordinary Fools, Pt. 2”, along with a new song titled “Hide Tonight”. The EP was released September 6, 2019. Later next month, Mohager announced a new album, and also stated the album would be coming sometime in 2020. The album title is still unknown, but the word “Honey” can be seen as part of the album title in Mohager's Instagram story. The album will have 12 tracks, and the remaining singles that weren't on the “Pollen” EP would be included on the album. “Such A Shame”, “YDLMA”, and “From Here Who Knows”. Also, Mohager released “20:25”, a collaborative Single with Flux Pavilion and What So Not.

On April 15, 2020, the single "4AM, Still Lonely" was released with the announcement of the fifth studio album, Honey Moon Drips, which was released on May 29, 2020.

In August 2020, Mohager announced his new band Heavenward, a grunge and alternative rock project. He released the debut single "Hole" on September 2, 2020. Another song, "In a Dream", was released on October 14. Each of the tracks feature contributions from his former Teenage Wrist band mates.

On June 16, 2023, Heavenward released their debut album, Pyrophonics.

== Tour history ==
The Chain Gang of 1974 has toured alongside bands, including AFI, Foster the People, The Naked and Famous, Washed Out, Cibo Matto, ABC, Big Audio Dynamite, Tapes 'n Tapes, Empires, Sir Sly, Miniature Tigers, and Geographer.

- Monolith Festival (2008)
- Lollapalooza (2011)
- Governors Ball Music Festival (2014)
- Austin City Limits Music Festival (2014)
- Capitol Hill Block Party (2014)
- Free Press Summer Fest (2014)

== Touring members ==
- Adam Halferty - drums, bass (2008, 2011)
- Brandon Anamier – drums (2008–2013)
- Justin Renaud – guitar (2010–2011, 2016)
- Tyler Venter – bass (2010–2011)
- Michael Spear – bass (2011)
- Jeff Appruzzese - bass (2011)
- Xander Singh - bass (2011)
- Rob Pera - guitar, bass (2011-2012)
- Jacob Bond – guitar (2011–2014)
- Sam Tiger – bass (2012–2014)
- Luc Laurent – drums (2013–2014)
- Eric Halvorsen – bass (2016-2017)
- Mike Robinson – drums (2016-2017)
- Troupe Gammage - guitar (2017)

== Discography ==
=== Studio albums ===
- White Guts (2010)
- Wayward Fire (2011)
- Daydream Forever (2014)
- Felt (2017)
- Honey Moon Drips (2020)

=== Remix albums ===
- Guerilla (2009)

=== Extended plays ===
- The Dirt EP (February 24, 2007)
- When The Apple Drops — EP (January 16, 2008)
- Fantastic Nostalgic: The Early Recordings (January 31, 2010)
- Pollen — EP (September 6, 2019)
- Besides — EP (March 5, 2021)

=== Split records ===
- Daytrotter Presents No. 39 (2015) (with Sir Sly)

=== Singles ===
- "What We Want" (2014) (cover of the original by The Naked and Famous)
- "When We Were Young" (2014) (Dillon Francis with Sultan + Shepard featuring The Chain Gang of 1974)
- "Drive" (2016) (Jai Wolf featuring Chain Gang of 1974)
- "20:25" (2019) (Flux Pavilion and What So Not featuring The Chain Gang of 1974)

== Songs in media ==
- Song "Make My Body" featured in Hostel: Part III (2011), Scream 4 (2011) and Arrow.
- Song "Hold On" featured in FIFA 12 (2011).
- Song "Devil Is a Lady" featured in Hostel: Part III (2011) and ‘’FIFA Street’’ (2012).
- Song "Undercover" featured in FIFA Street (2012).
- Song "Sleepwalking" featured in Grand Theft Auto V: The Official Trailer
  - "Sleepwalking" is also played in the game itself as radio music, and is featured on the official soundtrack.
  - "Sleepwalking" is also symbolically played as the end game credits theme for one of the game's three endings, mainly ending "B" (2013).
- Song "Miko" featured in FIFA 14 (2013).
- Song "You" featured in Real World: Ex-Plosion (2014).
