= Mercedes Arn-Horn =

Canadian musician (born 1993)

- Born: Mercedes Arn-Horn; October 31, 1993 (age 32); Toronto, Canada
- Origin: Kitchener, Ontario, Canada
- Genres: Alternative rock, Pop rock, acoustic rock, synthpop, grunge, shoegaze, indie, dreampop, Easycore (early)
- Occupations: Musician, songwriter, vocalist, director, actor
- Instruments: Vocals, guitar, bass guitar, keyboard, cello
- Years active: 2009–present
- Labels: Warner Canada, Easy Life Records
- Member of: Softcult
- Formerly of: Courage My Love

Mercedes Arn-Horn (born October 31, 1993) is a Canadian musician, songwriter, director and actor. She is the lead singer and guitarist of Canadian rock band Softcult, and was formerly the lead singer, guitarist and keyboardist of the Canadian rock band Courage My Love.

== Courage My Love ==
Mercedes formed Courage My Love in 2009 with her twin sibling Phoenix Arn-Horn (drums, vocals, keyboards) and David Blake-Dickson (bass). The band were signed to Warner Canada in early 2010 after being discovered at a Battle of The Bands competition in their home town of Kitchener, Ontario. Arn-Horn was 17 years old when she signed the deal. Brandon Lockwood replaced David Blake-Dickson on bass in 2012.

Courage My Love have released seven EPs and two full-length albums and have toured both in Canada and internationally with bands such as Simple Plan, As It Is, and Halflives.

== Softcult ==
Mercedes formed Softcult in 2020 with her twin sibling Phoenix Arn-Horn (drums, vocals). They were signed to British label Easy Life Records in 2020.

Softcult released its debut EP, Year Of The Rat, in 2021. A follow-up EP, Year Of The Snake, was released in 2022. Their third EP, See You In The Dark, was released in 2023.

== Discography ==
=== With Courage My Love ===
Albums:

- Becoming (Full-Length) (2015)
- Synesthesia (2017)

EPs:

- For Now (2011)
- For Now (Acoustic Sessions) (2012)
- Becoming (EP) (2013)
- Spirit Animal (2014)
- Skin and Bone (2014)
- Spectra (2020)
- Teenagers (remixes) (2020)

=== With Softcult ===
LPs:

- When A Flower Doesn't Grow (2026)

EPs:

- Year of the Rat (2021)
- Year of the Snake (2022)
- See You in the Dark (2023)
- Heaven (2024)

=== Others ===
- "All The Things She Said" (cover) - Halflives feat. Mercedes From Courage My Love
- "Still Love" - Teenage Wrist feat. Softcult

== Filmography ==
Year	Title	Role	Notes
1997	When Innocence Is Lost	Molly	
2005	1-800-Missing	Amanda Strickland	Episode: "A Death in the Family"
2009	Doppelganger	The Double	(Short)
TBA	Metalheads	Amanda Rozek	
