= Nova Rock Festival =

Music festival in Austria

Coordinates: 47.91205°N 17.08471°E

Nova Rock
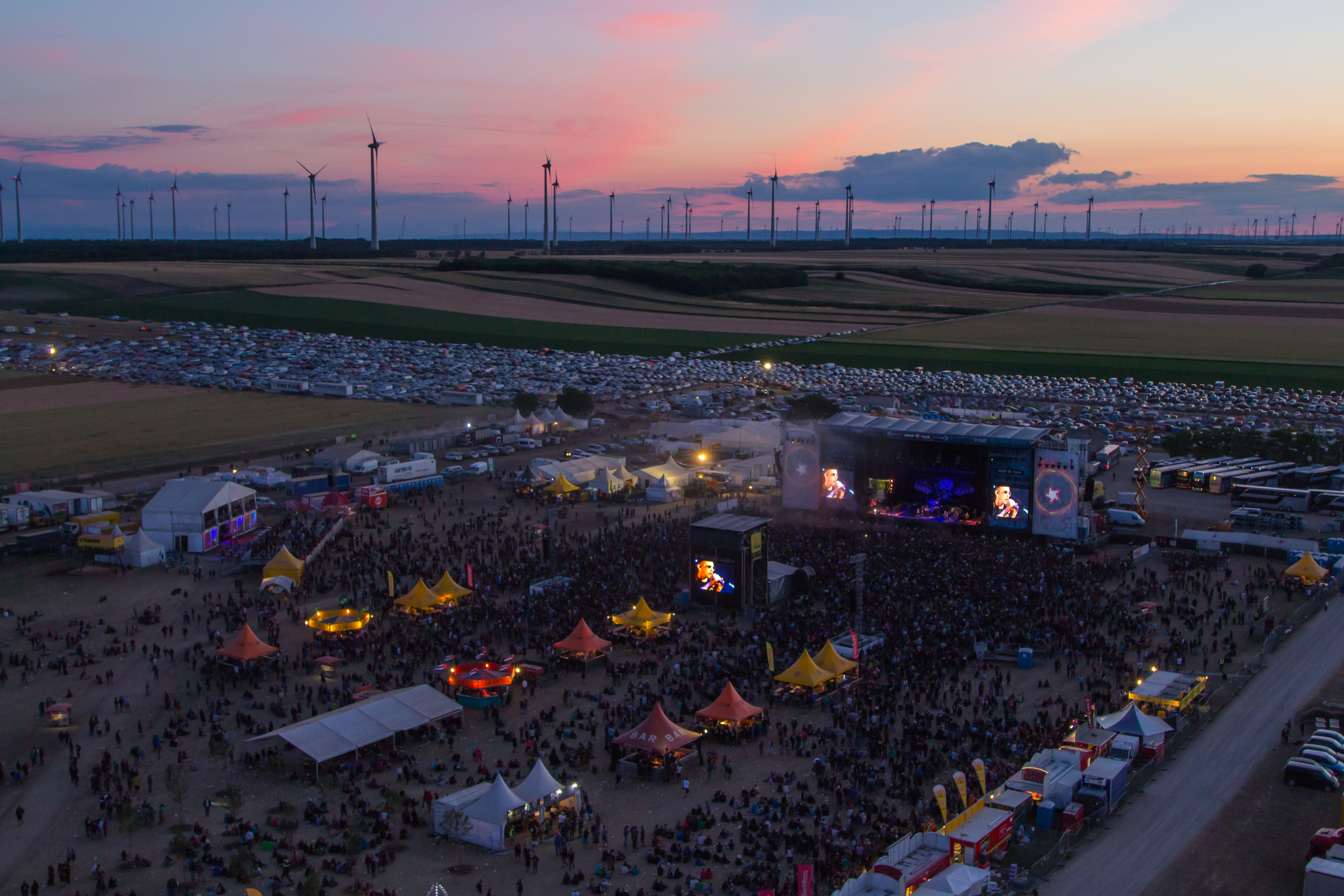
- Genre: Hard rock, Heavy metal, Punk rock
- Dates: Usually first weekend in June
- Locations: Nickelsdorf, Austria
- Years active: 2005–2019, 2022–present
- Website: novarock.at

The Nova Rock Festival, also just Nova Rock, is an Austrian rock festival that has existed since 2005 and takes place each year in June. It is located in Burgenland, the easternmost federal state of Austria, near Nickelsdorf and the Hungarian and Slovak borders. It is organized by Nova Music Entertainment, a cooperation between Musicnet, FKP Scorpio and several former employees/bookers of Wiesen, who left Wiesen in 2004.

The festival was cancelled in 2020 and 2021 due to the COVID-19 pandemic.

== 2005 lineup ==
Die Ärzte, Audioslave, Bad Acid Trip, Beatsteaks, BoySetsFire, Core, Green Day, In Extremo, La Vela Puerca, Mando Diao, Marilyn Manson, Moneybrother, Nightwish, The Prodigy, Soulfly, System of a Down, Weezer, Wir sind Helden

9. June	10. June	11. June	12. June
System of a Down	Die Ärzte	The Prodigy	Green Day
Audioslave	Marilyn Manson	Nightwish	Millencolin
Wir sind Helden	Weezer	Soulfly	BoySetsFire
Beatsteaks	Mando Diao	In Extremo	3 Feet Smaller
La Vela Puerca	The (International) Noise Conspiracy	Reel Big Fish	
Moneybrother	Mudvayne	The Dissociatives	
Team Sleep	Madsen	The Hellacopters	
Trail of Dead	Core	Schandmaul	
The Eighties Matchbox B-Line Disaster		Exilia	

== 2006 lineup ==
The 2006 Nova Rock festival was held from 15 to 17 June (Thursday to Saturday). It was the first year that the festival had two large stages (blue and red). The first bands announced on the Nova Rock homepage were: Guns N' Roses, Placebo, Metallica, Tool, Queens of the Stone Age, Massive Attack, Motörhead, Madsen, Billy Talent, Hard-Fi, Guadalajara, Seeed, Bodyrockers, She Male Trouble, Sportfreunde Stiller, Lagwagon, Subway to Sally and Julia.

Blue Stage			Red Stage		
15. June Thursday	16. June Friday	17. June Saturday	15. June Thursday	16. June Friday	17. June Saturday
Metallica	Placebo	Guns N' Roses	Sportfreunde Stiller	The Sisters of Mercy	Seeed
Motörhead	Massive Attack	Tool	Queens of the Stone Age	Subway to Sally	MIA.
Alice in Chains	Live	Bloodhound Gang	Hard-Fi	Lagwagon	Madsen
Alter Bridge	Starsailor	Oomph!	Deus	Gogol Bordello	Mina Caputo
Avenged Sevenfold	The Datsuns	Apocalyptica	Elbow	Kashmir	Julia
Stone Sour	The Sounds	Opeth	BodyRockers	Panteón Rococó	Virginia Jetzt!
Bullet for My Valentine	Billy Talent	Die Krupps	Living Things	The Locos	Disco Ensamble
Trivium	The Answer	Sebastian Bach	Zeronic	She-male Trouble	Matt Boroff
Bloodsimple	Tyler	Jesus Christ Smokes Holy Gasoline		Guadalajara	
Unheilig					

Originally Korn were announced to play the festival, but had to cancel it, as well as the "Nova Rock Encore", a concert in Vienna which they were expected to play with Deftones, Soulfly and Devildriver.

== 2007 lineup ==
Nova Rock Festival 2007 took place from 15 to 17 June with the following lineup:

Headliners: Billy Talent, The Smashing Pumpkins, Marilyn Manson, Pearl Jam, Slayer, The Killers,

The festival also consisted of bands including: Linkin Park, Machine Head, In Flames, Papa Roach, Reel Big Fish, Incubus, Mando Diao, The Hives, Me First and the Gimme Gimmes, Children of Bodom, Less Than Jake, Flogging Molly, Mastodon, Thirty Seconds to Mars, Isis, Aiden, In Extremo, Ill Niño, Within Temptation, Hayseed Dixie, The BossHoss and Chimaira.

Blue Stage			Red Stage		
15. June	16. June	17. June	15. June	16. June	17. June
The Smashing Pumpkins	Billy Talent	Pearl Jam	Marilyn Manson	The Killers	Slayer
Incubus	In Extremo	Linkin Park	In Flames	Mando Diao	Flogging Molly
The Hives	Machine Head	Thirty Seconds to Mars	Stone Sour	My Chemical Romance	Children of Bodom
Me First & The Gimme Gimmes	Papa Roach	Bright Eyes	Lordi	Less Than Jake	Drowning Pool
Editors	Reel Big Fish	Frank Black	Helmet	Modest Mouse	Clawfinger
IAMX	Mastodon	Sunrise Avenue	Ill Niño	Sarah Bettens	Chimaira
Fotos	Bosshoss	Hinder	Isis	The Dykeenies	Aiden
Johnossi	Hardcore Superstar	Hayseed Dixie	Negative	Excuse Me Moses	The Staggers
Under the Influence of Giants	In This Moment	Across the Delta	DevilDriver	TBA	Spout

== 2008 lineup ==
Confirmed lineup:

Blue Stage			Red Stage		
13. June	14. June	15. June	13. June	14. June	15. June
Die Ärzte	The Verve	Rage Against the Machine	Sex Pistols	Motörhead	Judas Priest
NOFX	Beatsteaks	Incubus	Cavalera Conspiracy	In Flames	Bullet for My Valentine
MIA.	Gavin Rossdale	Kid Rock	Jonathan Davis	Bad Religion	Disturbed
Ash	New Model Army (band)	Rise Against	Porcupine Tree	Subway to Sally	Alter Bridge
Alkbottle	Calico Soul	Anti Flag	Airbourne	Opeth	Enter Shikari
Hundred Reasons	The Godfathers	The Weakerthans	Rose Tattoo	Sonic Syndicate	Skindred
Donots	Melee	Guadalajara	Volbeat	Alpha Galates	Black Tide
Panteon Rococo	Sunshine	Jaguar Love	From First to Last	Kill Hannah	TBA
ZOX	Die Mannequin	Vanilla Sky	The Sorrow	Fire in the Attic	Spout

== 2009 lineup ==
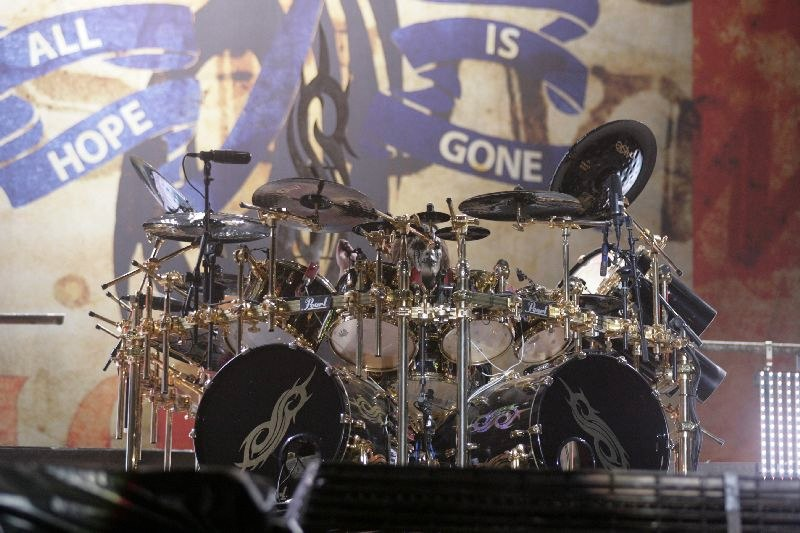
Slipknot drummer Joey Jordison performing at Nova Rock in 2009.

Confirmed bands as of 4 April 2009:

Blue Stage			Red Stage		
19. June	20. June	21. June	19. June	20. June	21. June
Metallica	Placebo	Die Toten Hosen	Nine Inch Nails	In Extremo	Machine Head
Slipknot	Kaiser Chiefs	Limp Bizkit	Faith No More	Chickenfoot	Dimmu Borgir
Mastodon	Chris Cornell	Guano Apes	Gogol Bordello	Killswitch Engage	Trivium
Disturbed	Staind	Madsen	Sunrise Avenue	Monster Magnet	Static-X
Black Stone Cherry	Dredg	Less Than Jake	The Gaslight Anthem	All That Remains	Sevendust
Caliban	Lacuna Coil	Duff McKagan's Loaded	The Living End	Dir En Grey	Bring Me the Horizon
Sonic Syndicate	Expatriate	3 Feet Smaller	Julia	Atrocity	August Burns Red
Drumatical Theatre	The Druango Riot	Kilians	The Temper Trap	Eisbrecher	And So I Watch You from Afar
Xenesthis	No Head on My Shoulders	Zeronic	Rolo Tomassi	Centao	Kontrust

== 2010 lineup ==
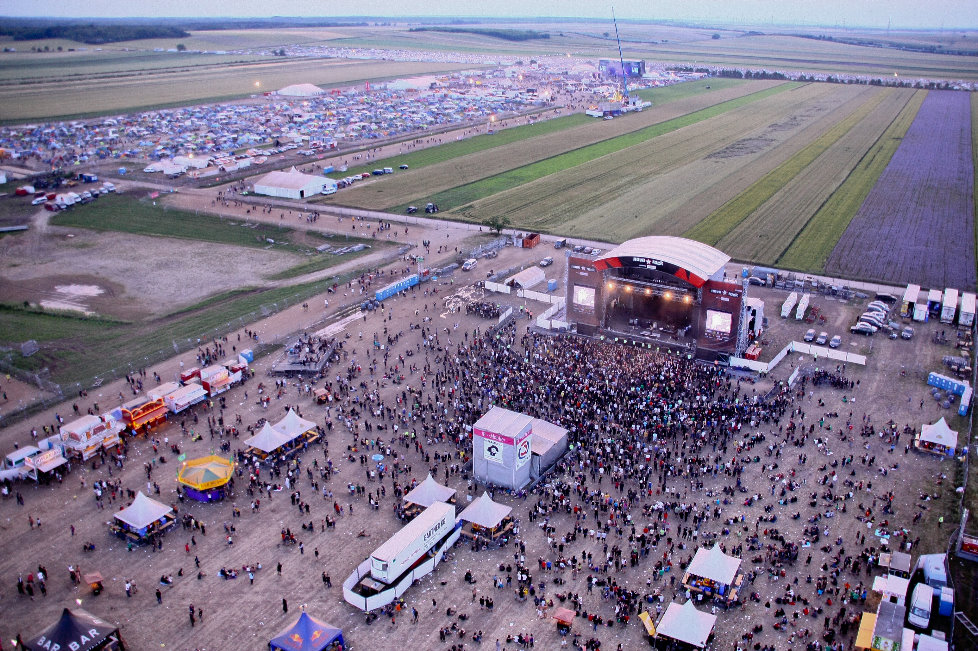
The Nova Rock festival Red Stage in 2010.

Date: 11. - 13. June 2010 Confirmed bands as of 23 November 2009:

Blue Stage			Red Stage		
11. June	12. June	13. June	11. June	12. June	13. June
Rammstein	Green Day	Beatsteaks	Deichkind	Slayer	Bullet for My Valentine
Stone Temple Pilots	Joan Jett	The Prodigy	Sportfreunde Stiller	Hatebreed	Killswitch Engage
Ska P	The Hives	The Bosshoss	Kate Nash	Amon Amarth	Deftones
Stone Sour	Enter Shikari	Alice in Chains	Bauchklang	Heaven Shall Burn	As I Lay Dying
Slash	Danko Jones	Bela B	Hot Water Music	Skindred	Unearth
Subway to Sally	Zebrahead	Alkbottle	Russkaja	Bleeding Through	36 Crazyfists
Airbourne	The Sorrow	The Get Up Kids	Saint Lu	Negative	A Day to Remember
Hellyeah	Red Lights Flash	Datarock	Guadalajara	From Dawn to Fall	Job for a Cowboy
Dillinger Escape Plan		The Gogets	Calibro 35	Cynic	Creature with the Atom Brain

== 2011 lineup ==
Date: 11. - 13. June 2011 Confirmed bands:

Blue Stage			Red Stage		
11. June	12. June	13. June	11. June	12. June	13. June
Linkin Park	Volbeat	Otto & Die Friesenjungs^{[A]}	The Darkness	Flogging Molly	System of a Down
Thirty Seconds to Mars	Korn	Iron Maiden	In Extremo	3 Doors Down	Social Distortion
Wolfmother	Danzig	Motörhead	HammerFall	Sublime with Rome	Pendulum
Guano Apes	Cavalera Conspiracy	In Flames	Sick of It All	Duff McKagan's Loaded	Alter Bridge
Dredg	Times of Grace	Bring Me the Horizon	Eisbrecher	Broilers	The Sounds
Plain White T's	Black Stone Cherry	Escape the Fate	Pain	Katzenjammer	BoySetsFire
Silverstein	Clutch	Architects	First Blood	Jennifer Rostock	The Pretty Reckless
Framing Hanley	Asking Alexandria	Neaera	Turisas	Blood Red Shoes	Yashin
Crash Kings	Blood Command	Seek & Destroy	Sister Sin	Kellermensch	Adept

^{[A]}Special Late Night Attraction

== 2012 lineup ==
Date: 08. - 10. June 2012 Confirmed bands:

Blue Stage			Red Stage		
08. June	09. June	10. June	08. June	09. June	10. June
Linkin Park	Die Toten Hosen	Metallica	Marilyn Manson^{[A]}	Limp Bizkit	Evanescence
Rise Against	Billy Talent	Nightwish	Within Temptation^{[A]}	Machine Head	The BossHoss
The Offspring	Cypress Hill	Slayer	Refused	Dimmu Borgir	Corey Taylor
The Baseballs	Kasabian	Mastodon	Lamb of God	Opeth	Mad Caddies
The Gaslight Anthem	Everlast	Oomph!	Killswitch Engage	Schandmaul	Turbonegro
Lagwagon	Eisbrecher	Trivium	Steel Panther	Hatebreed	Russkaja
The Answer	Puddle of Mudd	As I Lay Dying	August Burns Red	Biohazard	Awolnation
Royal Republic	Livingston	Gojira	DevilDriver	Triggerfinger	Cancer Bats
Gun	WBTBWB	Devin Townsend	Shinedown	While She Sleeps	AxeWound

^{[A]}Canceled due to storm.

== 2013 lineup ==
Date: 14. - 16. June 2013 Confirmed bands:

Blue Stage			Red Stage		
14. June	15. June	16. June	14. June	15. June	16. June
				Hans Söllner	
Rammstein	Kiss	Kings of Leon	Thirty Seconds to Mars	Deichkind	Volbeat
Airbourne	HIM	Sportfreunde Stiller	Within Temptation	Gentleman	Korn
Sabaton	Amon Amarth	Biffy Clyro	A Day to Remember	Stereophonics	Bullet for My Valentine
Five Finger Death Punch	Parkway Drive	Paramore	Anti Flag	Bauchklang	Papa Roach
Kreator	DragonForce	Coheed and Cambria	Coal Chamber	IAMX	Asking Alexandria
Testament	Cradle of Filth	Steven Wilson	P.O.D.	Bosse	Dir En Grey
Hellyeah	Amaranthe	Passenger	Gallows	Ohrbooten	Caliban
Heaven's Basement	The 69 Eyes	Johnossi	The Ghost Inside	The Bots	The Sword
		Fidlar			Wendi's Böhmische Blasmusik

== 2014 lineup ==
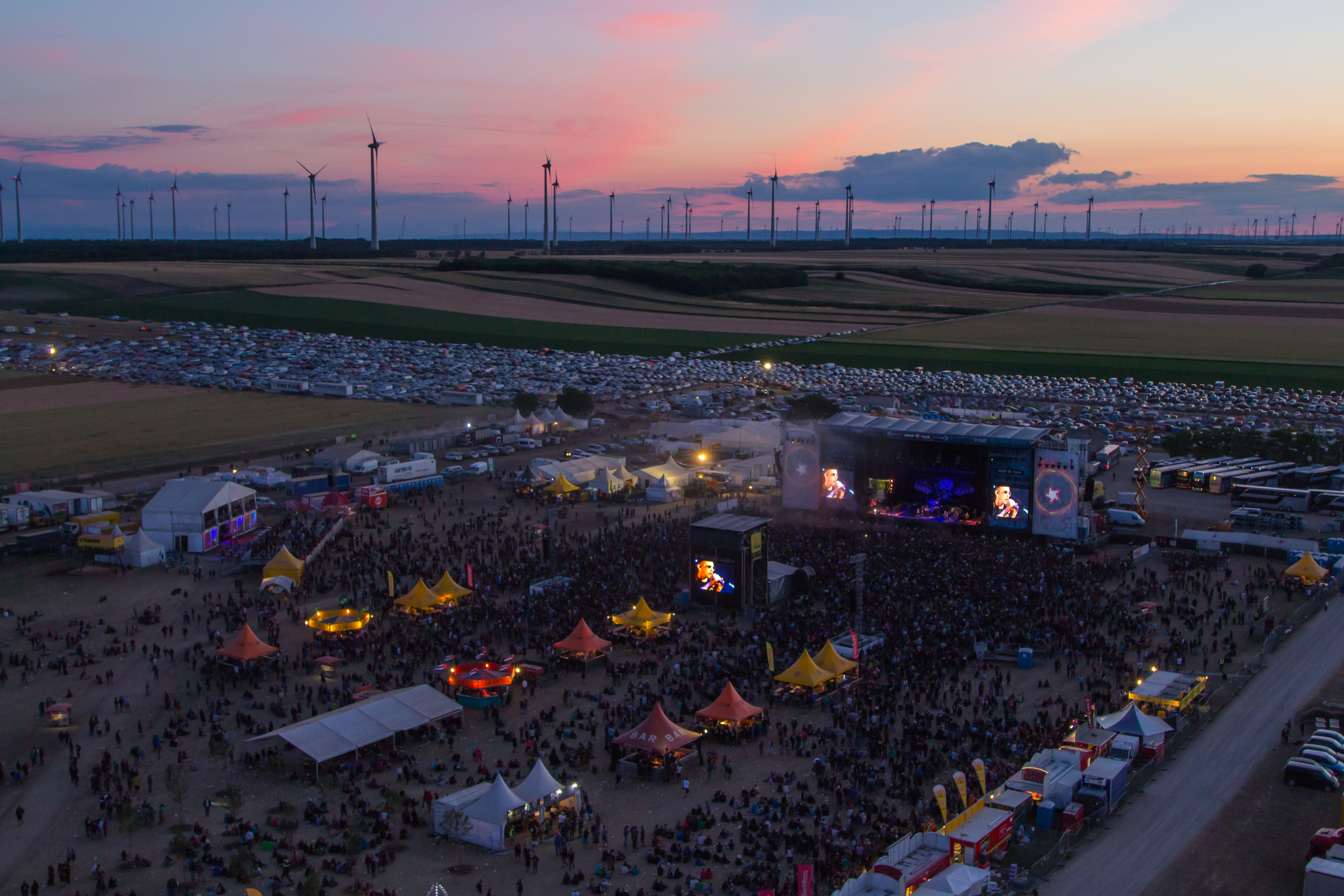
Blue Stage at Nova-Rock 2014

Date: 13. - 15. June 2014

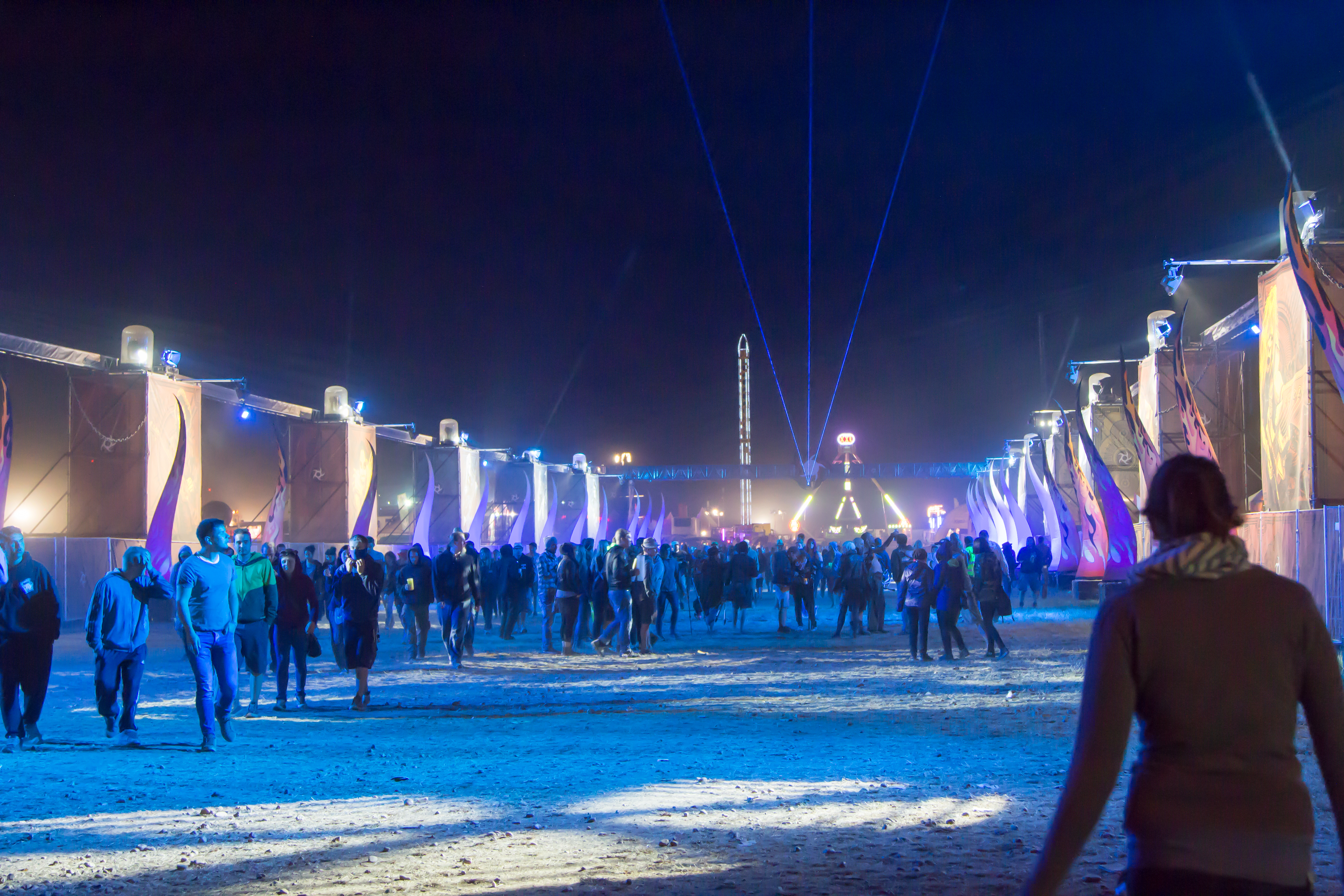
Highway to Hell 2014

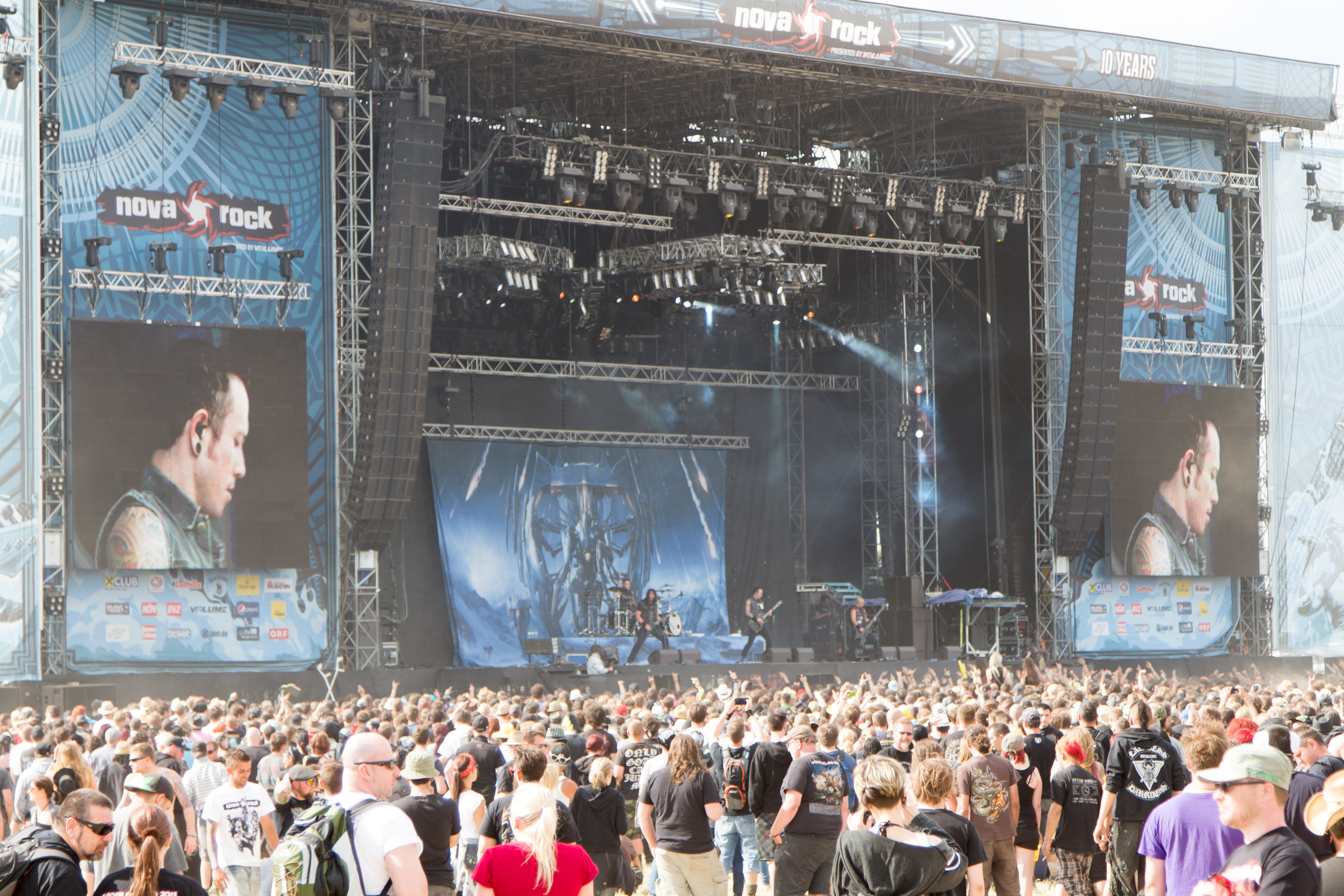
Trivium on Blue Stage

Blue Stage			Red Stage			Red Bull Brandwagen Stage		
13. June	14. June	15. June	13. June	14. June	15 June	13. June	14. June	15. June
The Prodigy	David Hasselhoff	Black Sabbath	Volbeat	Seeed	Soundgarden	Skillet	The Badpiper	Crowbar
Limp Bizkit	Iron Maiden	Avenged Sevenfold	Slayer	Mando Diao	The Offspring	Memphis May Fire	Blitz Kids	Kaiser Franz Josef
Casper	Amon Amarth	Rob Zombie	Steel Panther	Sunrise Avenue	Fettes Brot	Gerard	The Graveltones	Battlecross
Seether	Anthrax	Hatebreed	Black Stone Cherry	Awolnation	Dropkick Murphys	Reignwolf	Stu Larsen	Huntress
Irie Révoltés	Trivium	Black Label Society	Phil Anselmo	Mono & Nikitaman	Bad Religion	Birth of Joy	Brute	Powerman 5000
The Used	Ghost	Walking Papers	Sepultura	Samy Deluxe	Ed Kowalczyk	Sharron Levy	Tuxedo	Against Our Burial
Crazy Town	Epica	Arch Enemy	Bring Me the Horizon	K.I.Z	Karnivool	Silent Grey	Cursed by the Fallen	Dreaded Downfall
Panteón Rococó	Emergency Gate feat. Haddaway	Miss May I	Buckcherry					
			Wendi's böhmische Blasmusik					

== 2015 lineup ==
Date: 12. - 14. June 2015

Blue Stage			Red Stage			Red Bull Brandwagen Stage		
12. June	13. June	14. June	12. June	13. June	14. June	12. June	13. June	14. June
Scooter	Wolfgang Ambros	Slipknot	Beatsteaks	Nightwish	Deichkind	Lagwagon	Soltafir	Orchid
Mötley Crüe	Die Toten Hosen	Motörhead	Rise Against	In Flames	Farin Urlaub Racing Team	Mambo Kurt	Rakede	Northlane
Lamb of God	Die Fantastischen Vier	Five Finger Death Punch	Eagles of Death Metal	Papa Roach	The Gaslight Anthem	Code Orange	Heisskalt	Antilopen Gang
Mastodon	Kraftklub	Hollywood Undead	Guano Apes	In Extremo	Madsen	Friska Viljor	Betontod	All Faces Down
Parkway Drive	Rea Garvey	All That Remains	Yellowcard	Epica	Jennifer Rostock	Drescher	Milk+	99Plajo
Godsmack	Frank Turner	Eluveitie	All Time Low	Asking Alexandria	Fiva			
Life of Agony	L7	Powerwolf	Backyard Babies	Callejon	Moop Mama			
Deathstars	Blues Pills	Beyond the Black	Feine Sahne Fischfilet	The Answer	Alkbottle			
	Turbobier				Wendi's böhmische Blasmusik & Alkbottle			

== 2016 lineup ==
Date: 10. - 12. June 2016

Blue Stage			Red Stage			Red Bull Brandwagen Stage		
10. June	11. June	12. June	10. June	11. June	12. June	10. June	11. June	12. June
The Offspring	Alice Cooper	Deftones	Bullet for My Valentine	Seiler und Speer	Heaven Shall Burn	New Year's Day	Romano	Noah Kin
Garbage	Dropkick Murphys	K.I.Z	Trivium	Alligatoah	Killswitch Engage	Frank Carter & The Rattlesnakes	Max Raptor	Jesper Munk
Editors	August Burns Red	NOFX	Children of Bodom	Tom Odell	Behemoth	GWLT	Bombus	Lian
LaBrassBanda	Periphery	Mono & Nikitaman	Skindred	Steve 'n' Seagulls	We Came as Romans	The Wanton Bishops	Black Inhale	Skolka
Vintage Trouble	Caliban	Gary Clark Jr.	Atreyu	Zebrahead	The Amity Affliction	This Amity	Famp	TBC
White Miles	Slaves	Graham Candy	Tesseract	Krautschädl	Drescher	Local Heroes Sieger	M.P.	James Choice & The Bad Deosions
Bones	Attila	The Struts	Bloodsucking Zombies from Outer Space	Viech	Contest Band			
					Wendi's Böhmische Blasmusik			

== 2017 lineup ==
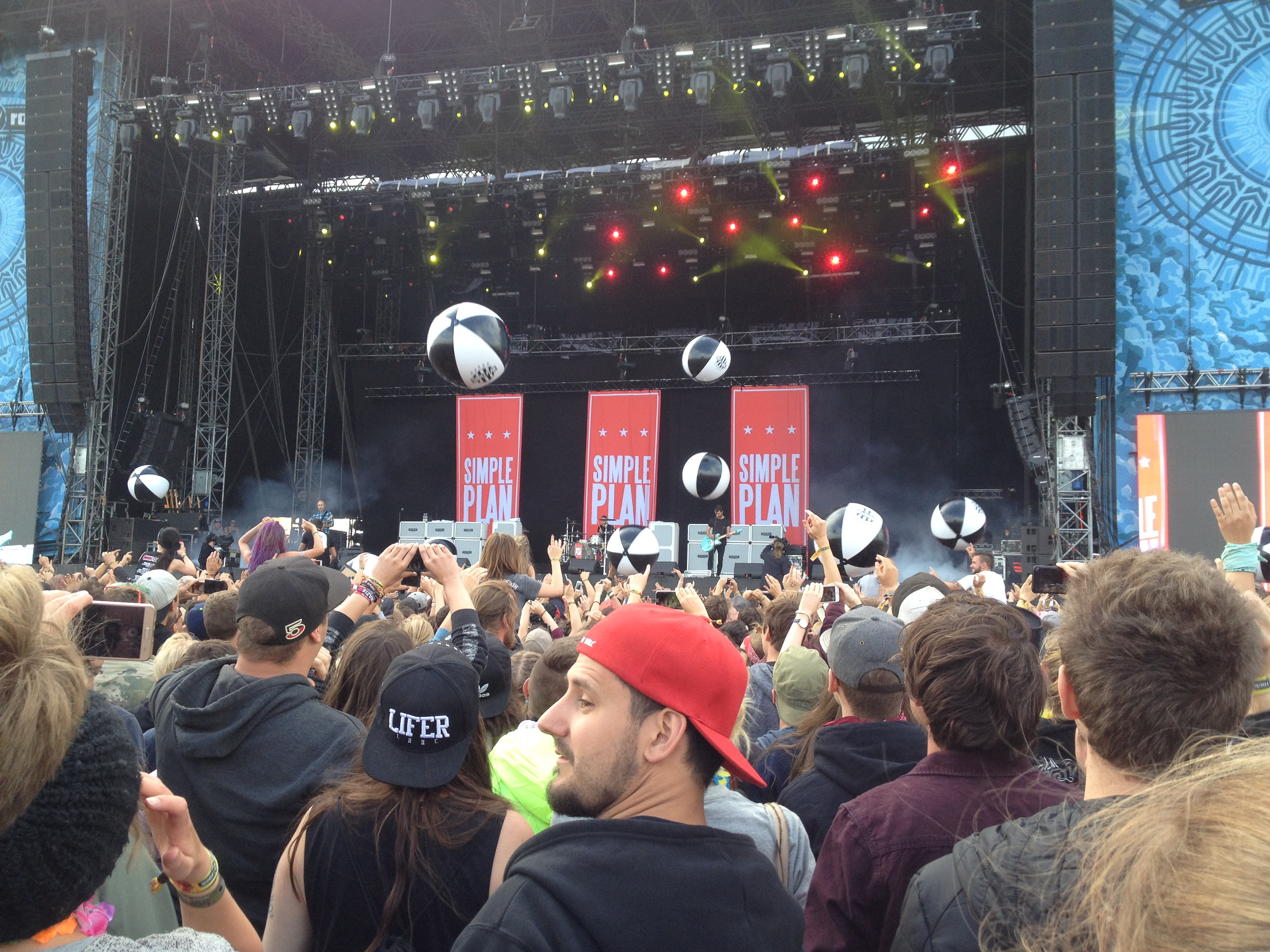
Simple Plan on Blue Stage

Date: 14. - 17. June 2017

Blue Stage
14. June (Warm Up)
Fatboy Slim
Linkin Park
Five Finger Death Punch
Steel Panther
Airbourne
La Pegatina
Like a Storm
A Caustic Fate

Blue Stage			Red Stage			Red Bull Brandwagen Stage		
15. June	16. June	17. June	15. June	16. June	17. June	15. June	16. June	17. June
Blink 182	System of a Down	Green Day	Slayer	Beginner	The Hoff	Stray from the Path	Callejon	Emil Bulls
Pendulum	Prophets of Rage	Rancid	In Flames	Knife Party	Sabaton	Touché Amoré	Moose Blood	Hacktivist
Good Charlotte	Kreator	Broilers	A Day to Remember	187 Strassenbande	Hatebreed	Alazka	All Faces Down	Lower Than Atlantis
Alter Bridge	Of Mice & Men	Simple Plan	Mastodon	SSIO	Epica	Kaiser Franz Josef	View	MC Bomber
Me First and the Gimme Gimmes	Pierce the Veil	Machine Gun Kelly	Gojira	Dawa	Black Star Riders	The Raven Age	Freiraum5	Mallory Knox
Danko Jones	Sleeping with Sirens	Rag'n'Bone Man	Architects	Jamaram	Suicide Silence	Red Sun Rising	As Lions	Ahzumjot
Suicidal Tendencies	Four Year Strong	Feine Sahne Fischfilet	The Dillinger Escape Plan	Alex Vargas	Eskimo Callboy	Me + Marie	Rant	The Overalls
Shame	Code Orange	Dead!	DevilDriver	Tschebberwooky	Black Inhale			
			Avatar		Wendi's Böhmische Blasmusik			

== 2018 lineup ==
Date: 14. - 17. June 2018

Blue Stage				Red Stage			
14. June	15. June	16. June	17. June	14. June	15. June	16. June	17. June
Die Toten Hosen (deleted)	Avenged Sevenfold	Volbeat	Iron Maiden	Marilyn Manson (blue stage)	The Prodigy	Billy Idol	The Bloody Beetroots
Seiler und Speer	Rise Against	Limp Bizkit	Killswitch Engage	Parkway Drive	Gentleman	Faithless Dj Set	Sunrise Avenue
Kraftklub	Jonathan Davis	Bullet for My Valentine	The Raven Age	Megadeth	Bad Religion	Wizo	Billy Talent
Stone Sour	Arch Enemy	Body Count ft. Ice-T		Skillet	OK Kid	Brian Fallon & The Howling Weather	Passenger
Hollywood Undead	Life of Agony	Baroness		Asking Alexandria	Mad Caddies	Dame (Rapper)	Enter Shikari
Dead Cross	Eisbrecher	Turbobier		Meshuggah	Anti-Flag	LaBrassBanda	Less Than Jake
Black Stone Cherry	Nothing But Thieves	Stick to Your Guns		Shinedown	Krautschädl	Donots	Wendi's Böhmische Blasmusik
All Them Witches	Beast in Black	Lionheart		Starcrawler	The Struts	The Last Internationale	
						Voting Act	

Red Bull Brandwagen Stage
14. June	15. June	16. June
Thrice	Leo Moracchioli	Powerflo
Thy Art Is Murder	Crazy Town	Oceans Ate Alaska
Our Hollow Our Home	Alazka	Adam Angst
The Charm The Fury	Jugo Ürdens	Boon
Marrok	Ebow	We Blame the Empire
Massendefekt	Culture Abuse	Tuxedoo
Ego Kill Talent	Black Cage	Dream Owner

== 2019 lineup ==
Date: 13. - 16. June 2019

Blue Stage				Red Stage			
13. June	14. June	15. June	16. June	13. June	14. June	15. June	16. June
Sabaton	The Cure	Die Toten Hosen	Die Ärzte	Pendulum Dj-Set	Frog Leap ft. Leo Moracchioli	Paul Kalkbrenner	Within Temptation
Slipknot	The Smashing Pumpkins	Bonez MC & Raf Camora	Slash ft. Myles Kennedy	Sum 41	Slayer	In Flames	Rob Zombie
Amon Amarth	Dropkick Murphys	Papa Roach	Wolfmother	Ska-P	Anthrax	In Extremo	Ministry
Lamb of God	Idles	RIN	Me First & The Gimme Gimmes	Mono & Nikitaman	Trivium	Powerwolf	Testament
Godsmack	New Model Army	Feine Sahne Fischfilet	Antilopen Gang	Pussy Riot	Behemoth	Children of Bodom	Bad Wolves
Three Days Grace	Mothers' Cake	Millencolin	Cari Cari	Folkshilfe	Beartooth	J.B.O.	Kontrust
I Prevail	Uncle Acid & The Deadbeats	Reel Big Fish		Luciano	Tesseract	Beyond the Black	Wendi's Böhmische Blasmusik
Amaranthe	Our Last Night	Badflower		Waving the Guns	Starset	Seek & Destroy	
					Schmutzki	To the Rats & Wolves	

Red Bull Brandwagen Stage
13. June	14. June	15. June
The Amity Affliction	Puddle of Mudd	While She Sleeps
Ferris MC	Haze	Welshly Arms
As It Is	Crystal Lake	All Faces Down
Palaye Royale	Fever 333	Infected Rain
Valeras	Like a Storm	Inglorious
Anchorage	TBC	Nova Twins
Coperniquo	Nothing, Nowhere.	Planet Music Act TBC

== 2022 lineup ==
Date: 09. - 12. June 2022

2022 was the first festival since 2019 due to the COVID-19 pandemic. Attempts were made to organize the festival in both 2020 and 2021, but were inevitably cancelled due to concerns with the virus.

Blue Stage				Red Stage			
09. June	10. June	11. June	12. June	09. June	10. June	11. June	12. June
Muse	Placebo	Volbeat	Five Finger Death Punch	Haddaway/Dr. Alban	Bring Me the Horizon	Deichkind	Alligatoah
Rise Against	Kraftklub	Seiler und Speer	Billy Talent	Bullet For My Valentine	Heilung	Dame	Gentleman
Evanescence	Maneskin	The Offspring	In Flames	Steel Panther	Korn	Mando Diao	WIZO
Bush	Sportfreunde Stiller	Bad Religion	Airbourne	Turbobier	Skillet	Mono & Nikitaman	Finch
Kennyhoopia	While She Sleeps	Electric Callboy	Eluveitie	Clawfinger	Epica	Querbeat	Green
Fire from the Gods	The Last Internationale	Jinjer	Kissin' Dynamite	Don Broco	Black Inhale	Alle Achtung	Faaschtbankler
Grandson	Hinds	Boston Manor	Imminence	Gloryhammer	Battle Beast	Waving the Guns	Mal Élevé
Cemetery Sun	King Nun	Monokay	The Weight	Black Veil Brides	Igel vs. Shark	Liedfeit	Wendi's Böhmische Blasmusik
				Blues Pills			

Red Bull Brandwagen Stage
09. June	10. June	11. June	12. June
Daiana Lou	La Jetta	Harold Taylor	Marley Wildthing
Matthias Beyer	Lucie	Ray.S	Florian the Historian
Andreas Ambler	Paul Toth	Esterhazy	Mani Leik
Chris Emray & Band	Kinga Dula	Cornerstone	Mark Peters & The dark band
Lydia	Tom Gomez Duo	Anton Josef	Riley Tamper
Sinn	Thieu	Spicecake	
Daniel Smith	Duo JLP	K.Wiena	

== 2023 lineup ==
Date: 07. - 10. June 2023

Blue Stage				Red Stage			
07. June	08. June	09. June	10. June	07. June	08. June	09. June	10. June
Slipknot	The Prodigy	Scooter	Die Ärzte	RIN	Parkway Drive	Electric Callboy	Falco tribute
Disturbed	Tenacious D	Bilderbuch	Broilers	Marteria	Powerwolf	Amon Amarth	Nightwish
Within Temptation	Yungblud	Casper	Incubus	Ska P	Three Days Grace	I Prevail	Architects
In Extremo	Sum 41	Papa Roach	Hollywood Undead	Simple Plan	Meshuggah	Wolfmother	VV
The HU	Fever 333	Feine Sahne Fischfilet	Nothing But Thieves	You Me at Six	Motionless in White	Avatar	Arch Enemy
Asking Alexandria	Funeral for a Friend	Thomas D & The KBCS	JOSH.	J.B.O.	Yonaka	Bury Tomorrow	Skindred
Lorna Shore	Blind Channel	Barns Courtney	Swiss und die Andern	PUP	Thundermother	Lionheart	Beyond the Black
Vended	Takida	Dirty Honey	Schmutzki	Pöbel MC	Autumn Bride	Bloodywood	Nothing More
		All Faces Down					Lord of the Lost
							Wendi's Blasmusik

Red Bull Stage
07. June	08. June	09. June	10. June
Stray from the Path	The Amity Affliction	Roman Gregory	Mother's Cake
Bibiza	Emil Bulls	downset.	Tschebberwooky
Donots	Bob Vylan	Taylor Acorn	Friedberg
Annisokay	Left Overs	Deine Cousine	Glueboys
Up Close	Dead Like Juliet	Paledusk	Le Craval
Daze Affect	Glazed Curtains	The Scratch	Anton Josef
FIIO	Cil City	Shatterfly	Voting act

== 2024 lineup ==
The Nova Rock 2024 festival took place from June 13 to 16. Headliners were Green Day, Avenged Sevenfold, Måneskin, and Bring Me the Horizon, though Avril Lavigne, The Sisters of Mercy, and Alice Cooper were also in the line ups. Unlike previous years, only the Blue and Red Bull Music stages were played during the last day of the festival.

According to festival organizers, the four festival days attracted around 200,000 attendees.

Blue Stage				Red Stage		
13. June	14. June	15. June	16. June	13. June	14. June	15. June
Green Day	Otto & die Friesenjungs	Måneskin	Bring Me the Horizon	The Sisters of Mercy	Pendulum	Alice Cooper
Billy Talent	Avenged Sevenfold	Avril Lavigne	Dropkick Murphys	Gloryhammer	Aut of Orda	Body Count feat. Ice-T
Jane's Addiction	Parkway Drive	Sum 41	Babymetal	Bloodsucking Zombies from Outer Space	Fäaschtbänkler	Steel Panther
Dogstar	Machine Head	Sportfreunde Stiller	Biohazard	Palaye Royale	Folkshilfe	P.O.D.
The Interrupters	Thy Art Is Murder	Granada	Beast in Black	Kerry King	Yaenniver	Saltatio Mortis
Donots	Igorrr	Blond	Black Stone Cherry	Asinhell	Neck Deep	Against the Current
Silverstein	Feuerschwanz	Leap	Escape the Fate	Alien Weaponry	Azahriah	Kontrust
Hot Milk	Of Mice & Men	The Amazons	Wendie's Böhmische Blasmusik	Hanabie.	Engst (band)	We Blame the Empire
	Wargasm					

Red Bull Stage
13. June	14. June	15. June	16. June
Smash into Pieces	Fit for a King	Life of Agony	Frank Carter & the Rattlesnakes
Counterparts	Ghostkid	Sondaschule	Swiss & Ferris aka Phoenix aus der Klapse
Missio	Dead by April	Future Palace	Hämatom
Bleed from Within	Cemetery Sun	Allt	Solence
Until I Wake	Aviana	Vertilizar	Silenzer
Long Distance Calling	Street to the Ocean	Monokay	Glazed Curtains
Montreal	Lowlife	Butter Bread	Arklight
			Focuside
			Mudfight

== 2025 ==
The 2025 festival is scheduled to take place from June 11 to 14, 2025. On June 13 of 2024, Slipknot, Electric Callboy, Wanda, The Warning, and Lorna Shore were announced for the 19th iteration of the festival.

Blue Stage				Red Stage		
11. June	12. June	13. June	14. June	12. June	13. June	14. June
Korn	Linkin Park	Powerwolf	Electric Callboy	Cradle of Filth	SDP	Dream Theater
Spiritbox	Rise Against	Slipknot	Wanda	In Flames	Folkshilfe	Heaven Shall Burn
The Ghost Inside	Iggy Pop	Lorna Shore	Alligatoah	Motionless In White	Biffy Clyro	Skillet
Knocked Loose	Awolnation	Airbourne	Idles	Apocalyptica	Irie Révoltés	Dragonforce
The Warning	Poppy	Refused	Mehnersmoos	Jerry Cantrell	GReeeN	Landmvrks
Seven Hours After Violet	Nothing More	Amaranthe	Me First and the Gimme Gimmies	Jinjer	Krautschädl	Imminence
Dead Poet Society	LØLØ	Baby Lasagna	The Butcher Sisters	Polaris	Deine Cousine	Versengold
	Anna-Sophie	Igel vs. Shark	All Faces Down	Kittie	Sawyer Hill	Django 3000
						Wendie's Böhmische Blasmusik

Red Bull Stage
11. June	12. June	13. June	14. June
Boston Manor	Health	Thrice	Danko Jones
Itchy	Deafheaven	Whitechapel	Adept
Amira Elfeky	Normandie	Call Me Karizma	Paleface Swiss
From Fall to Spring	House of Protection	Filth	Self Deception
BlackGold	Vowws	Glueboys	Halflives
VANDANS	STESY	GYFTH	Leons Massacre
The Fleur	The Generation	The Attic	Velvet Wasted
