= Mighty Sounds =

Annual ska and punk music festival in Tábor, Czechia

- Genre: Punk rock, Rock’n’Roll, Hardcore, Reggae, Ska, Rockabilly, Indie rock
- Dates: 3 days, last weekend in June
- Locations: Airport Capuv dvur, Tábor
- Years active: 2005–present
- Founders: HPK Production
- Website: www.mightysounds.cz

Mighty Sounds is ska and punk music festival in the Czech Republic, held annually in June near the city of Tábor. Established in 2005, the first festival took place in the village of Olší near Opařany, and remained there for the first five years.

In 2007 the festival attracted around 10,000 people, and in 2010 its attendance exceeded 12,000 people, making it one of the biggest festivals of its kind in Europe.

== Festival ==
The festival is held over three days. Originally the festival featured one large stage and a second smaller one, plus a theatre tent. Another smaller tent known as the "Sado maso stage" featured techno and drum'n'bass DJs. After heavy rain in 2009 festival site and a nearby campsite for visitors was damaged by mud, and the owner of the site did not renew the contract for next event. Mighty Sounds moved to an unused grass-covered airfield in Tábor for the 2010 event. The festival subsequently featured two large stages, called the Jan Hus and Jan Zizka stages. Other stages included the Theater tent, hosting less-known bands; the Radio 1 stage, featuring electronic music DJs; and the Rudeboy Rhythm stage, which features DJs playing older ska, reggae, rocksteady and punk music. Since 2017, the festival also includes an acoustic stage.

The 2020 and 2021 editions did not take place due to the COVID-19 pandemic. Thanks to a crowdfunding campaign entitled "Keep The Wind In Our Sails", the festival was able to continue.

As of 2023, the festival has deployed cashless payments, and switched to ceramic toilets instead of mobile ones.

In 2026, Mighty Sounds celebrates its 20th anniversary.

== Past festivals ==
Nr	Date	Visitors	Notable artists
1	8–10 July 2005	4,500	Persiana Jones; Skarface
2	14–16 July 2006	6,000	The Hotknives; Panteón Rococó; Desorden Público; The Toasters; Mark Foggo's Skasters
3	13–15 July 2007	10,000	Derrick Morgan; Skalariak; Mad Sin; The Slackers; Dr. Ring-Ding; The Peacocks; Karamelo Santo
4	18–20 July 2008	12,000	The Real McKenzies; Obrint Pas; Mad Caddies; Demented Are Go; Sonic Boom Six; Vice Squad; Subhumans; The Turbo A.C.'s; The Toasters
5	18–20 July 2009	9,000	Buzzcocks; Backyard Babies; Pat Kelly; Dave Barker; Chris Ellis; NoMeansNo; Dub Inc.; The Aggrolites; The World/Inferno Friendship Society; The Peacocks; Talco; Liberator
6	16–18 July 2010	9,000	Pauline Black; The Busters; Civet; Donots; H_{2}O; Mad Sin; Russkaja; Ska-P; Skarface; Sworn Enemy; Third World
7	15–17 July 2011	12,000	Anti-Flag; Anthony B; The Casualties; The Creepshow; Demented Are Go!; Dub Pistols; Karamelo Santo; Madball; Obrint Pas; Pennywise; Ska2tonics; The Skatalites; The Toasters
8	13–15 July 2012	over 10,000	Adolescents; Alborosie; Biohazard; The Carburetors; Discharge; Distemper; Frank Turner; Gallows; Inner Circle; Irie Révoltés; The Locos; Los de Abajo; The Meteors; The Peacocks; Pipes and Pints; Poison Idea; The Real McKenzies; The Skints; Sonic Boom Six; Street Dogs; The Varukers
9	19-21 July 2013		Suicidal Tendencies; Anti-Flag; The Subways; Bad Manners; Ky-Mani Marley; Comeback Kid; Macka B; Skindred; Sto zvířat; Vavamuffin; Stranger Cole; U.K. Subs; The Business
10	11-13 July 2014		Dropkick Murphys; Irie Révoltés; Nekromantix; Perkele; The Slackers; GBH; Winston Francis; The Real McKenzies; Madball; Sto zvířat; The Peacocks; Evergreen Terrace
11	24–26 July 2015		Architects; Batmobile; Bombshell Rocks; Cockney Rejects; Conflict; Defeater; Dub Incorporation; Dubioza kolektiv; Enter Shikari; Expire; Funeral for a Friend; Ignite; Jaya the Cat; King Kurt; Los de Abajo; Off!; Pannonia Allstars Ska Orchestra; Passafire; Pipes and Pints; Protoje & the Indiggnation; Random Hand; Rattus; Red Fang; Sick of It All; Strung Out; Terror; The Carburetors; The Creepshow; The World/Inferno Friendship Society; Versus the World
12	22-24 July 2016	14000	Irie Révoltés; Lagwagon; Perkele; Julian Marley; Asian Dub Foundation; The Rumjacks; The Locos; Frank Carter and the Rattlesnakes; The Bones; Silverstein; Being as an ocean
13	14-16 July 2017	9,500 (7,900 paid) capacity: 12,000	Gogol Bordello; Cock Sparrer; Dubioza Kolektiv; Agnostic Front; The Adicts; Ignite; Big Mountain; H2O; Jaya The Cat; The Beat; Acidez
14	13-15 July 2018	11,000 (8,750 paid) capacity: 12,000	Anti-Flag; Royal Republic; Sick Of It All; Dub FX; Inner Circle; Talco; The Rumjacks; Mad Sin; Zebrahead
15	12-14 July 2019	9,150 (5,950 paid) capacity: 13,000	Turbonegro; Dubioza Kolektiv; While She Sleeps; Deez Nuts; H2O; The Casualties; The Original Wailers; The Skatalites; Donots; Jaya The Cat
16	8-10 July 2022	8,100 (5,200 paid) capacity: 12,000	Dropkick Murphys; Social Distortion; Royal Republic; The Rumjacks; Agnostic Front; Anti-Flag; The Baboon Show; Being As An Ocean; Dub Pistols; Acidez; Che Sudaka
17	23-25 Jun 2023	6,859 (5,437 paid) capacity: 10,000	Rancid; The Interrupters; Enter Shikari; Hatebreed; Dub Fx; Black Flag; Frank Turner & The Sleeping Souls; Ignite; Moscow Death Brigade; Dog Eat Dog; Comeback Kid
18	28-30 Jun 2024	6,817 (5,326 paid) capacity: 10,000	Bad Religion; The Hives; Dubioza Kolektiv; Cock Sparrer; The Rumjacks; Agnostic Front; The Baboon Show; Panteón Rococó; The Casualties; Silverstein; Feine Sahne Fischfilet; Counterparts

== See also ==
- List of punk rock festivals
- List of reggae festivals
