= List of number-one hits of 2017 (Austria) =

This is a list of the Austrian number-one singles and albums of 2017 as compiled by Ö3 Austria Top 40, the official chart provider of Austria.

Issue date	Song	Artist	Album	Artist
6 January	"Hallelujah"	Pentatonix	Weihnachten	Helene Fischer
13 January	"Alone"	Alan Walker	MTV Unplugged	Andreas Gabalier
20 January	"Shape of You"	Ed Sheeran	Neujahrskonzert 2017	Vienna Philharmonic and Gustavo Dudamel
27 January	"Shape of You"	Ed Sheeran	Neujahrskonzert 2017	Vienna Philharmonic and Gustavo Dudamel
3 February	"Shape of You"	Ed Sheeran	Neujahrskonzert 2017	Vienna Philharmonic and Gustavo Dudamel
10 February	"Shape of You"	Ed Sheeran	Das neue Festament	Turbobier
17 February	"Shape of You"	Ed Sheeran	Makarov Komplex	Captain Bra
24 February	"Shape of You"	Ed Sheeran	Fifty Shades Darker: Original Motion Picture Soundtrack	Various artists
3 March	"Shape of You"	Ed Sheeran	Falco 60	Falco
10 March	"Shape of You"	Ed Sheeran	Falco 60	Falco
17 March	"Shape of You"	Ed Sheeran	÷	Ed Sheeran
24 March	"Shape of You"	Ed Sheeran	÷	Ed Sheeran
31 March	"Shape of You"	Ed Sheeran	Spirit	Depeche Mode
7 April	"Shape of You"	Ed Sheeran	We Got Love	The Kelly Family
14 April	"Hey Bro"	Marco Wagner and Dave Brown	Cara Mia	Andy Borg
21 April	"Shape of You"	Ed Sheeran	und weida?	Seiler und Speer
28 April	"Despacito"	Luis Fonsi featuring Daddy Yankee	und weida?	Seiler und Speer
5 May	"Despacito"	Luis Fonsi featuring Daddy Yankee	The Burning Spider	Parov Stelar
12 May	"Despacito"	Luis Fonsi featuring Daddy Yankee	Humanz	Gorillaz
19 May	"Despacito"	Luis Fonsi featuring Daddy Yankee	Laune der Natur	Die Toten Hosen
26 May	"Despacito"	Luis Fonsi featuring Daddy Yankee	Helene Fischer	Helene Fischer
2 June	"Despacito"	Luis Fonsi featuring Daddy Yankee	Helene Fischer	Helene Fischer
9 June	"Despacito"	Luis Fonsi featuring Daddy Yankee	Helene Fischer	Helene Fischer
16 June	"Despacito"	Luis Fonsi featuring Daddy Yankee	Helene Fischer	Helene Fischer
23 June	"Despacito"	Luis Fonsi featuring Daddy Yankee	Black Friday	Bushido
30 June	"Despacito"	Luis Fonsi featuring Daddy Yankee	Maximum	KC Rebell and Summer Cem
7 July	"Despacito"	Luis Fonsi featuring Daddy Yankee	Ein Teil von mir	Semino Rossi
14 July	"Despacito"	Luis Fonsi featuring Daddy Yankee	Ein Teil von mir	Semino Rossi
21 July	"Despacito"	Luis Fonsi featuring Daddy Yankee	Sing meinen Song – Das Tauschkonzert, Vol. 4	Various artists
28 July	"Despacito"	Luis Fonsi featuring Daddy Yankee	Sampler 4	187 Strassenbande
4 August	"Despacito"	Luis Fonsi featuring Daddy Yankee	One More Light	Linkin Park
11 August	"Despacito"	Luis Fonsi featuring Daddy Yankee	In der Nacht	Nockalm Quintett
18 August	"More Than You Know"	Axwell & Ingrosso	In der Nacht	Nockalm Quintett
25 August	"More Than You Know"	Axwell & Ingrosso	In der Nacht	Nockalm Quintett
1 September	"More Than You Know"	Axwell & Ingrosso	Der Ruf meines Herzens	Oliver Haidt
8 September	"More Than You Know"	Axwell & Ingrosso	Anthrazit	RAF Camora
15 September	"More Than You Know"	Axwell & Ingrosso	Unerhört solide	Pizzera & Jaus
22 September	"Señorita"	Kay One featuring Pietro Lombardi	Tru.	Cro
29 September	"Señorita"	Kay One featuring Pietro Lombardi	Concrete and Gold	Foo Fighters
6 October	"Señorita"	Kay One featuring Pietro Lombardi	Ohne wenn und aber	Nik P.
13 October	"Dusk Till Dawn"	Zayn featuring Sia	Royal Bunker	Savas and Sido
20 October	"Columbo"	Wanda	Niente	Wanda
27 October	"Rockstar"	Post Malone featuring 21 Savage	Beautiful Trauma	Pink
3 November	"Perfect"	Ed Sheeran	Kiddy Contest Vol. 23	Kiddy Contest Kids
10 November	"Was du Liebe nennst"	Bausa	Des olls is Hoamat	Seer
17 November	"Was du Liebe nennst"	Bausa	Zukunftsmusik	Dame
24 November	"Perfect"	Ed Sheeran	Reputation	Taylor Swift
1 December	"Was du Liebe nennst"	Bausa	÷	Ed Sheeran
8 December	"Was du Liebe nennst"	Bausa	Sing meinen Song – Das Weihnachtskonzert – Volume 4	Various artists
15 December	"Was du Liebe nennst"	Bausa	Jung brutal gutaussehend 3	Kollegah and Farid Bang
22 December	"Was du Liebe nennst"	Bausa	÷	Ed Sheeran
29 December	No Top 40 released			
