= Irie Révoltés =

German band

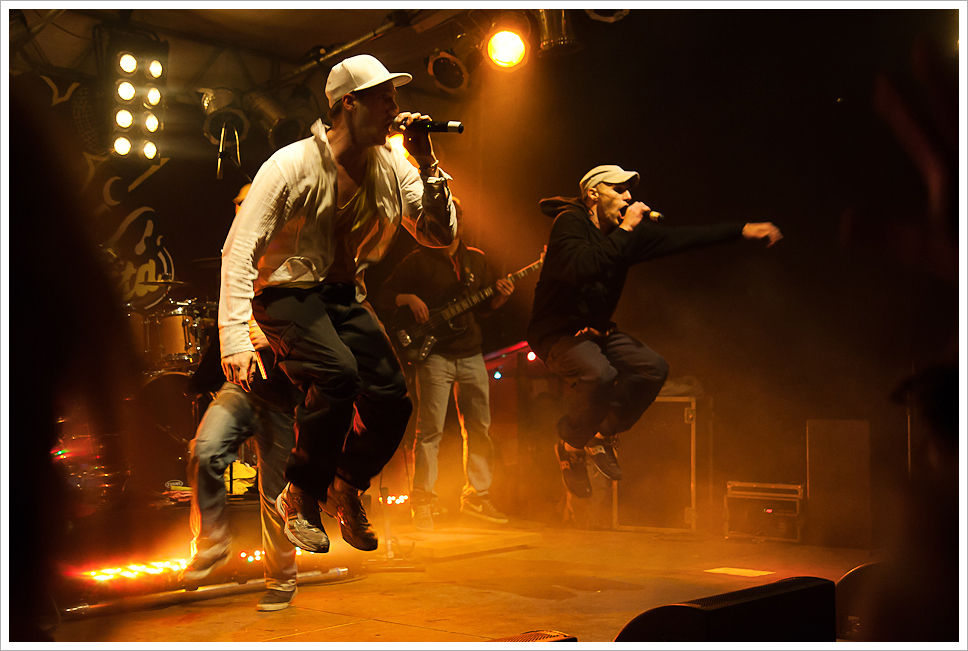
- Irie Revoltes in 2011

Background information
- Genres: Reggae; dancehall; hip hop; ska; punk
- Years active: 2000–2017; 2025
- Past members: Mal Élevé; Carlito; Silence; idoT; Ziggi; King Kong; Chriggi; Toby!; Mickez; Flex; Conriot; Valentin v. Seggern
- Website: irie-revoltes.com

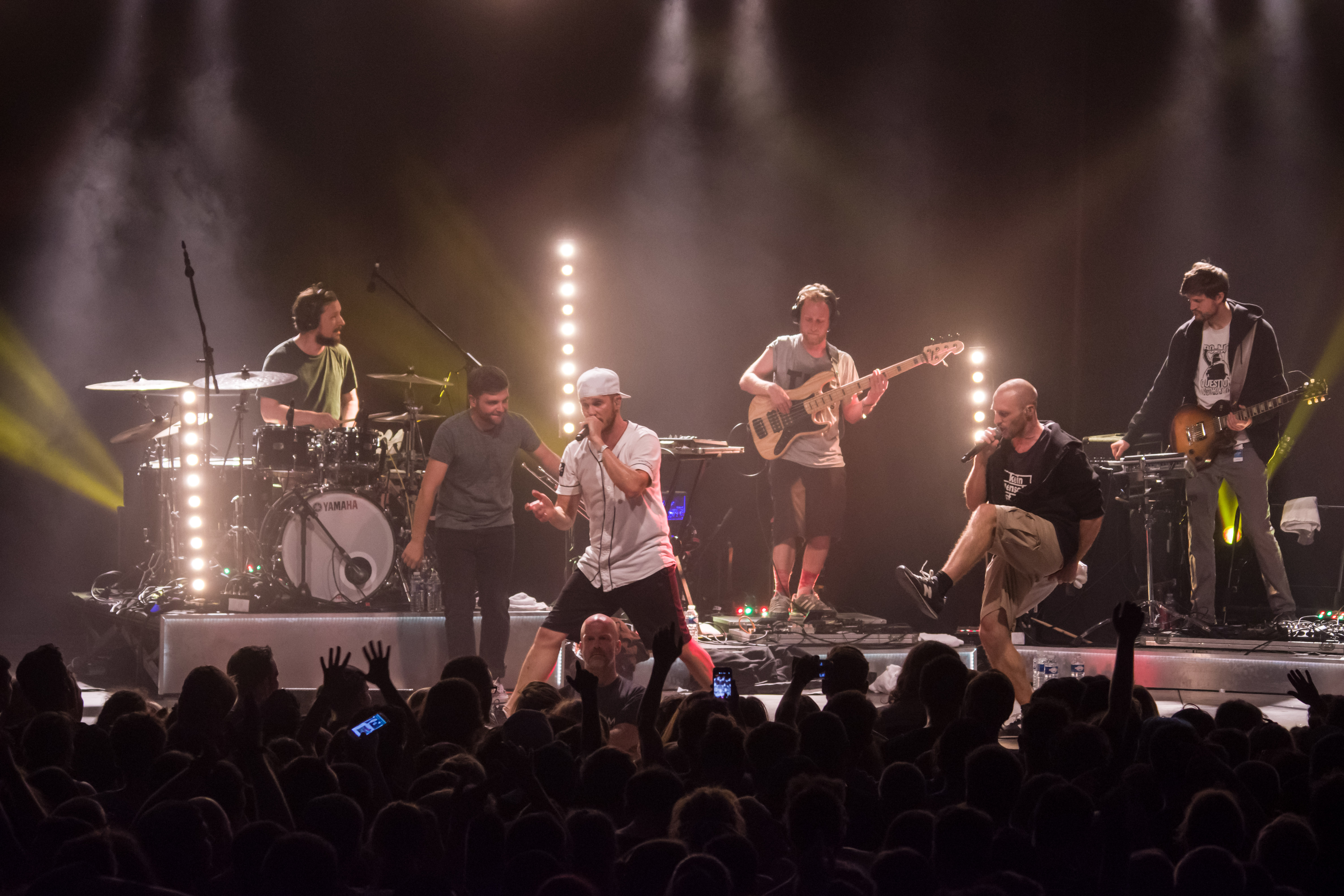
Irie Revoltes, Zelt-Musik-Festival 2017 in Freiburg, Germany

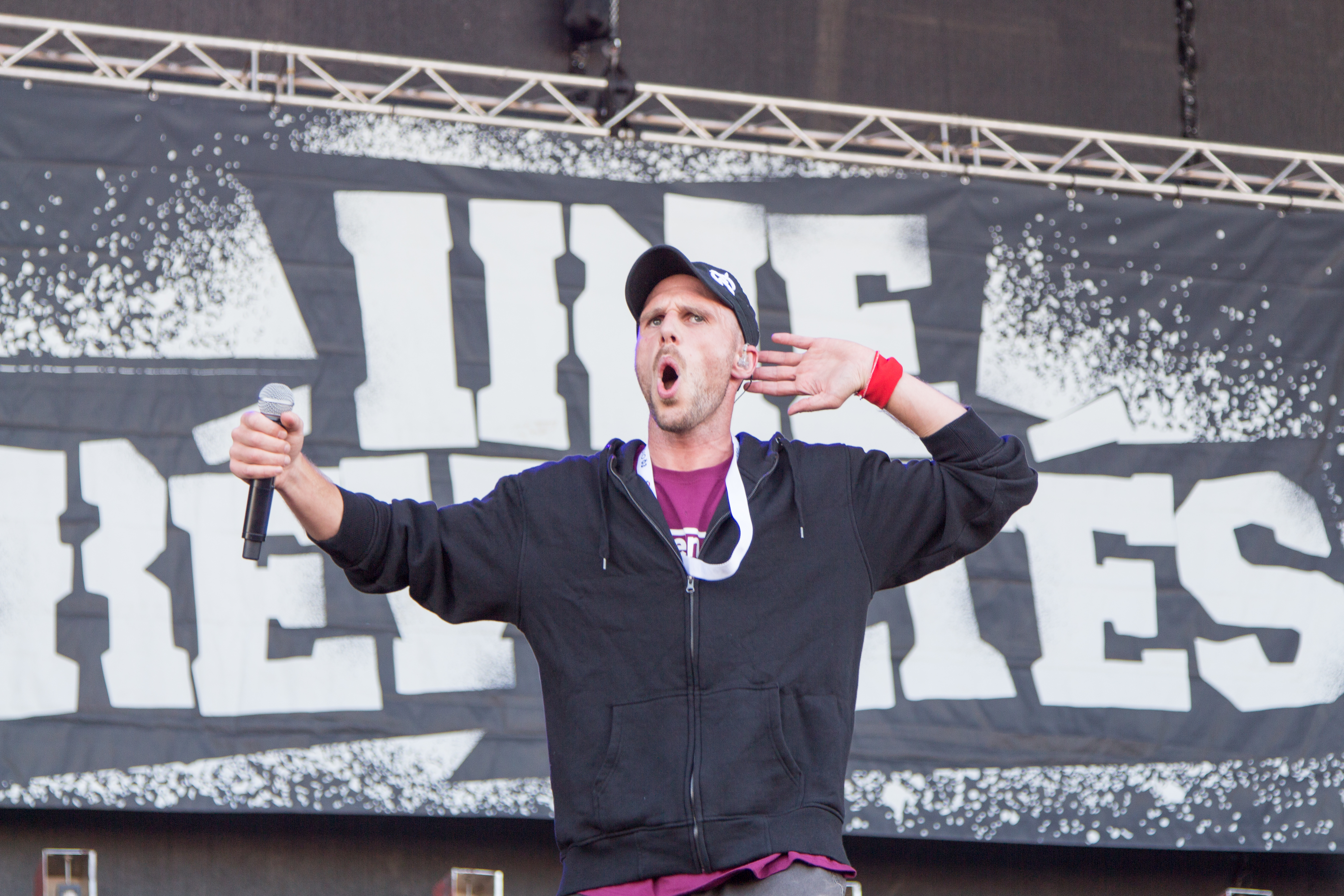
Irie Révoltés at Nova Rock 2014

Irie Révoltés was a music band from Heidelberg, Germany, formed in 2000. Among its nine members, the brothers "Mal Élevé" and "Carlito" have French origins. For this reason, many of the band's song lyrics are in French. The word "irie" derives from Jamaican Patois and can be loosely translated as "positive" or "happy", whereas "révoltés" means "rebels" in French. Their music was mainly influenced by genres like reggae, dancehall, ska, punk, electro, and hip hop.

The band's songs deal with controversial social issues, and they regularly performed at demonstrations and charity events, in support of political and social projects. In October 2016, they announced their final concert, which took place on 26 December 2017.

In late 2024, the band announced a reunion tour of Europe, headlining festivals including Mighty Sounds, ending in December 2025. In an interview, the band stated, "We are not going to record, we are only returning to shows, but we want them to surpass everything we have done. So now we are running around with ideas".

== Band members ==
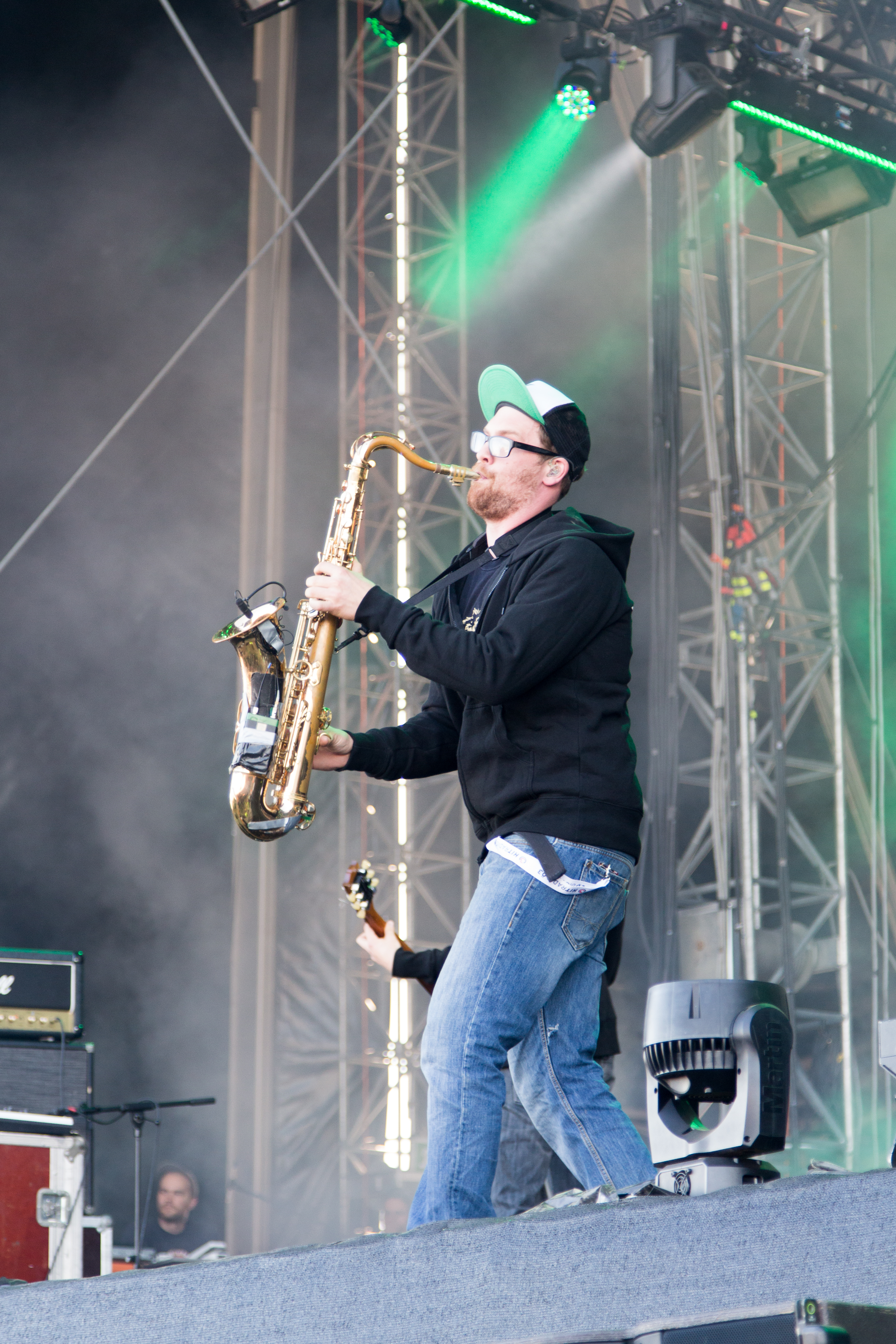
Irie Révoltés at Nova Rock 2014

- Pablo "Mal Élevé" Charlemoine
- Carlos "Carlito" Charlemoine
- Andreas "Silence" Spreier
- Tobias "idoT" von Kitzing
- Ziggi
- King Kong
- Christian "Chriggi" Comba
- Tobias "Toby!" Bär
- Michael "Mickez" Comba
- Felix "Flex" Mussell
- Conrad "Conriot" Sievers
- Valentin v. Seggern

== Discography ==
=== Studio albums ===
- Les deux côtés (2003)
- Voyage (2006)
- Zeit ist Geld (EP, 2009)
- Mouvement mondial (2010)
- Irie Révoltés Live (DVD & CD, 2012)
- Allez (2013)
- Irie Révoltés (2015)
