= Green Lizard (band) =

Dutch rock band

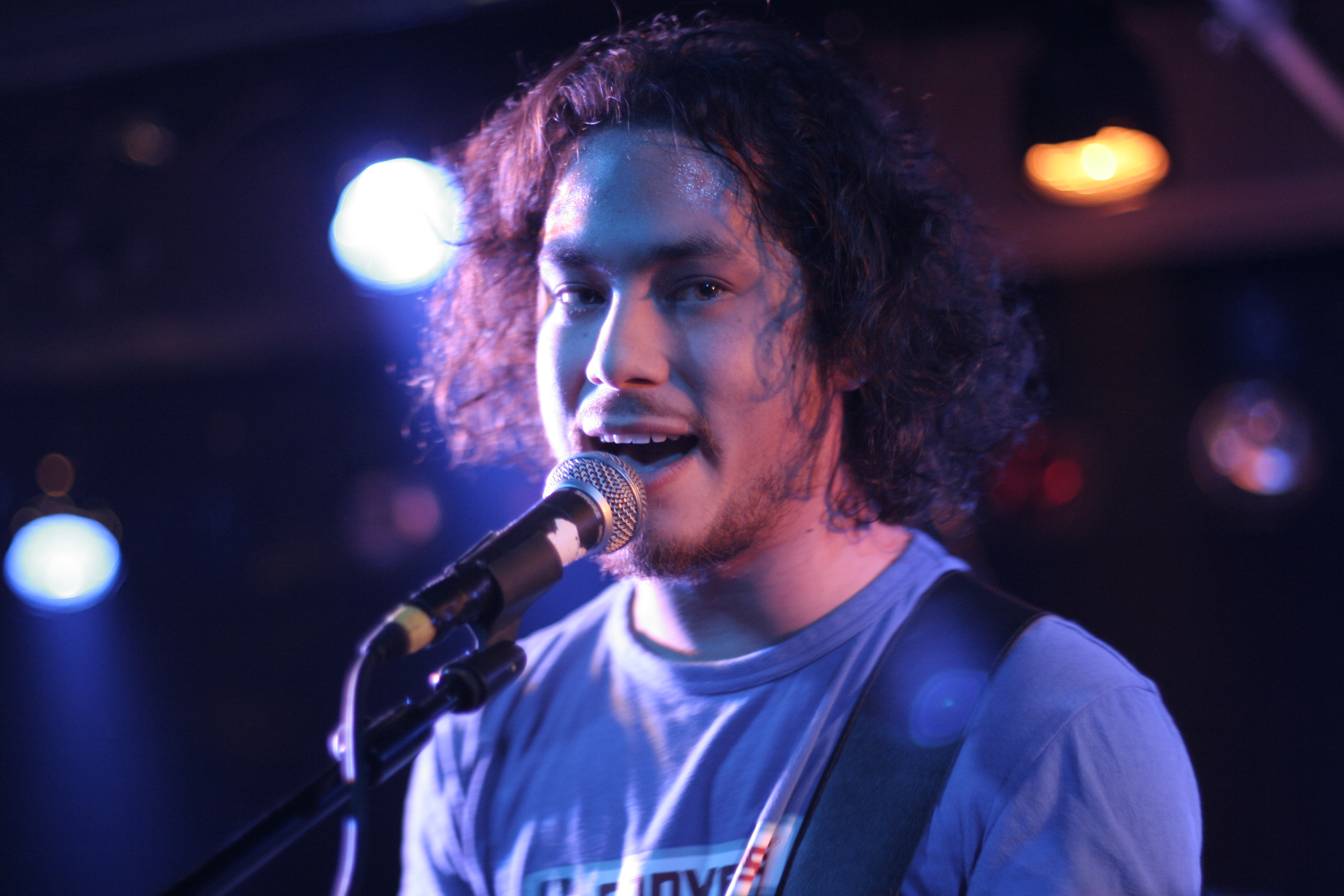
Green Lizard in 2006

Green Lizard is a band from Tilburg, Netherlands that plays rock and roll, with influences from grunge, punk rock, hard rock and metal.

== Members ==
=== Current members ===
- Remi Tjon Ajong - guitars, lead vocals
- Brian Tjon Ajong - guitars, backing vocals
- Willy Tjon Ajong - guitars, backing vocals
- Jan Jaap Onverwagt - bass
- Roeland Uijtdewilligen - drums

=== Past members ===
- Axel van Oort - bass
- Jochem van Rooijen - drums
- Jasper Dankaart - drums
- Bram van de Berg - drums (shows in April 2007)

== History ==
Green Lizard was founded in 1994 and the first success happened in 1996 when they won the Big Prize of the Netherlands (annual competition for unknown bands to win money and gigs). Late 1997 they re-release The Nine EP a year later with record label Double T Music which would release their next album as well. This EP was produced by Jack Endino, famous for his work with Nirvana and Soundgarden (to name a few) and was recorded in just 9 days.

In 2000, Green Lizard released their first album called Identity, produced by Clif Norrell (famous for his work with bands like Faith No More and Skunk Anansie). The videoclip for the first single from this album, Turn Around, won the Golden Calf award for the animation, made by singer Remi. That same year they played the festival Pinkpop festival, when Moloko couldn’t make it. In 2001 they played the festival again and live recordings were made for a small live EP, which would be released as a separate disc (only at gigs) and as a bonus disc which accompanied the rerelease of Identity. The second single is Autumn. The videoclip mocks (boy)bands fabricated by recordlabels. Guesting in the clip are various members of Dutch bands and standup comedy. In 2001 the band received the Silver Harp Award for Identity. The song Down was re-recorded. The new version of the song, called Down 2K1, featured Dutch rapper Brainpower and DJ TLM, and was released as the third single.

In 2002, their second album was released by Sony Records (Double T music was now a part of Sony), called Newborn. The album was presented to the audience at the Lowlands festival. Again the record was produced by Clif Norrell. Henry Rollins guested on two tracks: on the track Common God, which appeared on the album and on the track Die Fucker, which appeared as the b-side to the first single of the album Wrong. The 4 versions of the second single Mouthful were made into a live album. In 2004 their contract with Sony ended and the band went on to write songs for their third album in silence. Various bandmembers went to play music in other projects, like Jaya The Cat and The Original Soundtrack. In 2005 Newborn was released in Europe, with a bonus disc including several clips, movies and songs from Identity. In January of that year the last show was played with guitarist Willy Tjon Ajong. During an emotional show band and audience said farewell to him. With him the song Ceilito Lindo was removed from the sets, as there is no-one that can play the intro to that song quite like him. The show was recorded by Fabchannel and can be viewed online (see external links).

In January 2006, Green Lizard released their third album, called Las Armas Del Silencio. The album was recorded in various places in the Netherlands and was mixed by Clif Norrell in Los Angeles. The album was released by I Scream Records (home of bands like Agnostic Front and Backfire!). The first single, One Minute, was released before the album and is a split EP with the Belgian Punk band Janez Dedt. Both contribute two songs (the other Green Lizard song being All You Have). On May 5 the album was released in Europe and in 2007 the record was released in the United States. From July the band was represented by the TKO Agency, which represents bands like Motörhead, Ministry and Life of Agony. This means the band would do shows all around the world, the first of which was the festival Sziget festival. Green Lizard released a split single with The Gathering with their single Walk Over Water especially for this festival.

In March 2007, drummer Roeland Uijtdewilligen left the band. The physical strain of years of drumming took its toll. He'll continue to play in his folkband We Nun Henk. On April first he played his last show with Green Lizard, where Willy turned up to play a song with them. Jasper Dankaart, formerly of the metalband Agresion took over from Bram van den Berg (Krezip), who took over temporarily.

The band was on its way to write the next record when in November 2007 bassist Jay left the band. As a result, the band has suspended all current activities and it is unclear at this moment if the band will return.

Green Lizard is well known for their energetic live performances. The band has toured extensively, with bands like The Gathering, Krezip, Brainpower, Agresion, Soda P, The League Of XO Gentlemen, The Riplets, San Andreas and Cooper, and has performed with international acts like Alien Ant Farm, Dredg, Deftones, The Rasmus and Living Colour. They have also played various festivals like Pinkpop, Lowlands, Roskilde, and the Vans Warped Tour.

== Discography ==
=== Albums ===
- Identity (2000)
- Newborn (2002)
- Las Armas Del Silencio (2006)

=== EPs ===
- The Nine EP (1997)
- Pinkpop 2001 live EP (2001)
- One Minute EP (2005) (with Belgian punk band Janez Dedt)
- Check (2018)

=== Singles ===
- "Turn Around" (2000)
- "Autumn" (2001)
- "Down 2k1" (2001)
- "Wrong" (2002)
- "Mouthful" (2003)
- "Walk Over Water" (2006)
