= Krautschädl =

- Origin: Wels, Upper Austria
- Genres: Rock, ska, funk, metal
- Years active: 2003–2019, from 2025
- Label: FM Music (Hoanzl)

Krautschädl is an Austrian rock band from Wels (Upper Austria). Despite their name, the group cannot be considered a Krautrock act. The band performs a mix of rock, funk, and ska, and they also draw some influences from metal. The lyrics to their songs are in the Upper Austrian dialect.

== Background ==
In spring 2004 Krautschädl began playing concerts. One year later they released their first demo tape with 3 tracks -s'Gösserl, Zeit zum Denga ("Time to Think") and Sandlerstah- and started recording tracks for their album. They finally signed in with Sony BMG and re-recorded these tracks in 2005. In March 2006 their first eponymous LP was released and subsequently the single Zeit zum Denga was played on the Austrian TV-channel "GoTV".

In February 2012 they participated in the national preselection contest for the Eurovision Song Contest 2012 with the song "Einsturzgefohr".

And a song released on 2014 for the WM "gib ma scho den boi".

In 2015 come the album "Immer mit da Ruhe".

In 2019 they gave their final concert in Salzburg after they announced that they would dissolve.

== Discography ==
- Demo-CD [EP] (2004)
- Krautschädl [LP] (2006)
- Da Wein [single] (2006)
- Im Kraut [LP] (2007)
- GemmaGemma [LP] (2011)
- Da Sommla [single] (2015)
- Feiah Fonga [single] (2015)
- Imma mit da Ruhe [LP] (2015)

== Members ==
- Philipp "Mölgie" Sikora – vocals/guitar
- Stefan "Sonti" Sonntagbauer – bass guitar
- Lukas "Plescha" Plescher – drums
