= Jaya the Cat =

Dutch/American band

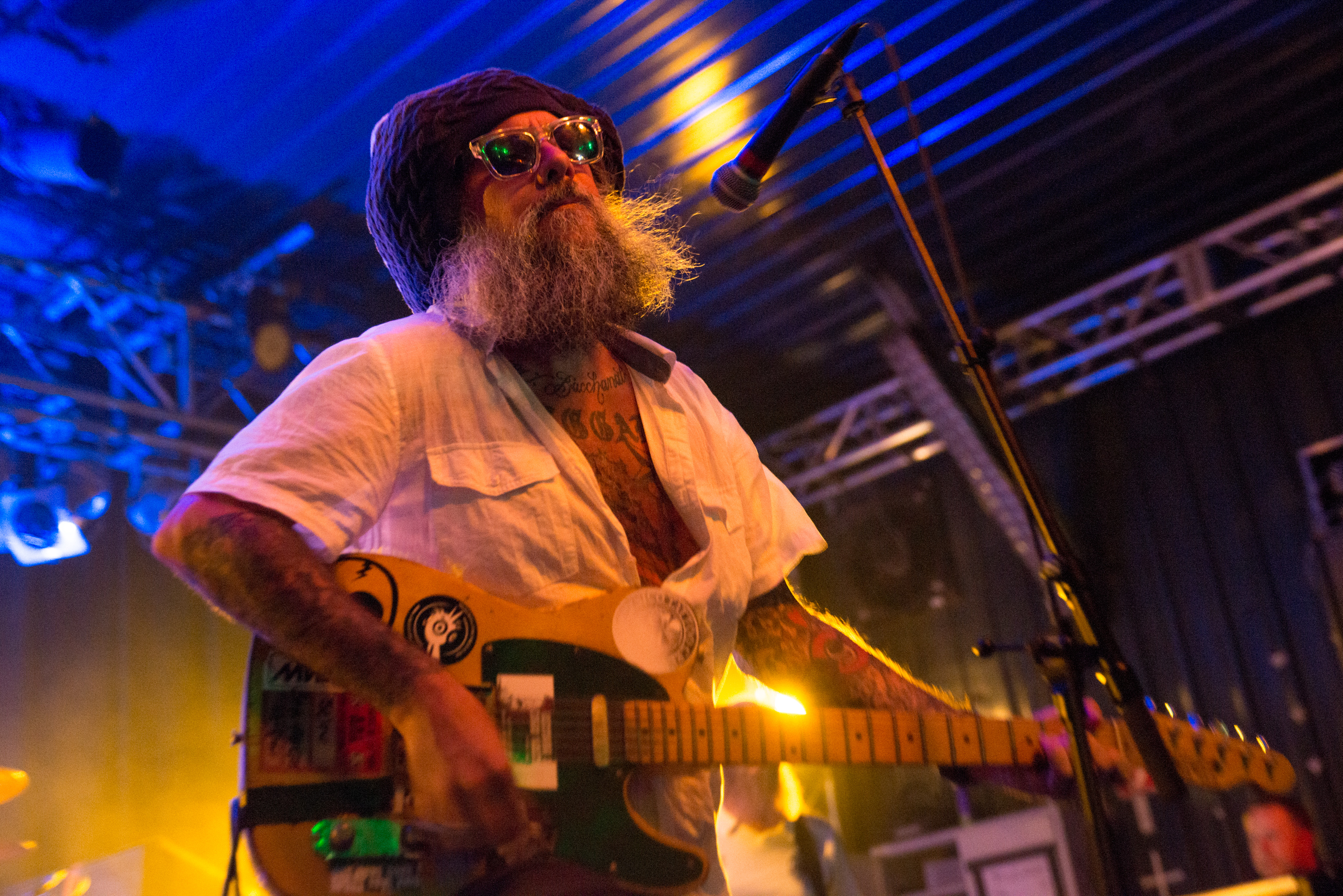
- Singer Geoff Lagadec live in 2014

Background information
- Origin: Boston, United States; Amsterdam, Netherlands
- Genres: Reggae, ska, punk rock
- Years active: 1998–present
- Labels: Bomber, Ring of Fire, I Hate People, I Scream, Music Machine, 4tune, Gold Circle
- Members: Geoff Lagadec; David "The Germ" Germain; Jan Jaap "Jay" Onverwagt; Joep Muijres; Niklas Gralla
- Past members: Ben Murphy; Dave Smith; Hugh Brockmyre; JJ O'Connell; Ausberto Acevedo; Alejandro Londoño; Brian Tjon Ajong; Jordi Newcastle; Steven Brautigam; Jeroen Kok; Daniel Peper; Johan "Leon" van 't Zand; Dino Memic; Karl Smith; Tommy Kennedy
- Website: jayathecat-band.com

Jaya the Cat is a Dutch/American reggae/ska/punk rock band originating from Boston, United States, but currently based in Amsterdam, Netherlands. The band formed in 1998 and has released four full-length studio albums, one independent release and one live album.

== History ==
Jaya The Cat was founded in the late 1990s by Geoff Lagadec (vocals/guitar), Dave Smith (guitar/vocals), Hugh Brockmyre (drums) and Ben Murphy (bass/vocals) in Boston, Massachusetts. Their first recording "O'Farrell" was an independent release that gained much attention and got them their first record deal on Gold Circle Records. Their first major release album Basement Style was recorded at Slaughterhouse studios in Amherst, Massachusetts with studio drummer and longtime friend of Murphy's JJ O'Connell. It was received well among critics and fans and gained attention in the northeast and southwest of the United States, but really began to pick up steam in Europe. After drummer David "The Germ" Germain (formerly with Shadows Fall) joined the band they began touring the US on the Vans Warped Tour and Europe.

In 2001, the band arrived in the Netherlands to play the Lowlands Festival, and in 2003 they recorded a live album, Ernesto's Burning. After the release of the second studio album First Beer of a New Day, Dave Smith (guitar) and Ben Murphy (bass) quit the band. Shortly afterwards, Smith and Murphy formed the American rock/punk/country band Ragged Old Flag. The remaining members of Jaya the Cat decided to move to Amsterdam where they teamed up with Jan Jaap "Jay" Onverwagt (bass, ex-Green Lizard) and Alejandro Londoño (guitar, Cultura Tres) to continue their efforts from Europe.

In 2005, Brian Tjon Ajong (guitar, also ex-Green Lizard) joined the band to replace Londoño. Shortly after, Jordi Nieuwenburg replaced Tjon Ajong on guitar and Onverwagt, who had moved on to play keyboards for the band, was replaced by Steven Brautigam on bass.

The band's third album More Late Night Transmissions With... was released on November 16, 2007, by I Scream Records. More Late Night's sound is considerably more laidback compared to their previous releases, drawing more on reggae influences than the previous two albums. More Late Night Transmissions With... was re-issued by Bomber Music in April 2014, on CD and green vinyl.

The fourth studio album The New International Sound Of Hedonism was released by Bomber Music in the summer of 2012. After the release of Hedonism, the band was joined by Johan "Leon" van 't Zand (live keys, ex-Mark Foggo) to complete the live formation. A year later, guitarist Nieuwenburg left the band and was replaced by Dino Memic (ex-Vine Yard). In June 2013, original bassist Ben Murphy rejoined the band on stage in the Netherlands to play a handful of songs from the first two releases as Jay took over duties as party MC.

In November 2014, the band announced that van 't Zand left. Karl Smith (ex-Mr Shiraz, ex-Tropical Contact and drummer of Complicated Men Of Leisure) took over his duties on keys at the start of Jaya the Cat's UK tour with the Mad Caddies. Though the lineup has changed numerous times throughout the years, Jaya the Cat manage to remain true to their roots and continue to press on forward. With the departure of Dino Memic in September 2016 Smith moved on to guitar, and Christian Greevink filled his former position on keys for live shows.

On November 17, 2017, the band released their fifth studio album A Good Day for the Damned through Bomber Music. It was also announced that their long time friend and former roadie, 'Sexy' Joep Muijres, has taken over live keyboard duties from Greevink indefinitely.

In March 2023 Karl left the band and is with The Barstool Preachers since.

The name of the band is speculated to come from the fact they had a cat named Jaya which they drove in their van when going to gigs.

== Members ==
=== Current members ===
- Geoff Lagadec (1998–present) – vocals, guitar
- David "The Germ" Germain (2002–present) – drums
- Jan Jaap "Jay" Onverwagt (2004–present) – bass, keyboards, vocals
- Joep Muijres (2017–present) – keyboards
- Niklas Gralla (2025–present) – guitar

=== Former members ===
- Hugh Brockmyre – drums (1998–2002)
- JJ O'Connell – drums (2002)
- Dave Smith – guitar, vocals (1998–2003)
- Ben Murphy – bass, vocals (1998–2003)
- Alejandro Londoño – guitar, vocals (2004)
- Brian Tjon Ajong – guitar, vocals (2005)
- Steven Brautigam – bass (2005–2008)
- Jeroen Kok – bass (2008–2010)
- Daniel Peper – keyboards, vocals (2010–2012)
- Jordi Newcastle – guitar, vocals (2005–2013)
- Johan "Leon" van 't Zand – keyboards (2012–2014)
- Christian Greevink – keyboards (2016–2017)
- Karl Smith – guitar, vocals, keyboards (2014–2023)
- Dino Memic – guitar, vocals (2013–2016, 2023)
- Tommy Kennedy – guitar (2023–2024)

=== Live musicians ===
- Brian Tjon Ajong – guitar, keys
- Yanko Brekov – guitar
- Russ Abu – bass
- Matt Crosher (Random Hand) – guitar (One time performance Rebellion 2011 and guest on El Camino during 2012 winter UK tour)
- Marcia Richards and Joshua Waters-Rudge of The Skints – vocals (One time performance Rebellion 2011)
- Oskar Glasbergen – drums (at times when The Germ was broken)
- Boris Manintveld – drums (ditto)
- Sergei Christian (Call It Off (band)) – drums (ditto)
- Phillip „FaF“ Pfaff (de:Sondaschule, de:The Tips) – bass
- Geordy Justify (Total Chaos) – bass

== Discography ==
- O'Farrell (CD, 1999)
- Basement Style (CD, Gold Circle, 2001)
- First Beer of a New Day (CD, 4Tune, 2003)
- Ernesto's Burning (CD/LP, Music Machine, 2004)
- More Late Night Transmissions With... (CD, I Scream, 2007)
- Closing Time (CD Single, I Scream, 2007)
- First Beer of a New Day (LP, I Hate People Records, 2011)
- First Beer of a New Day (CD re-release, I Hate People Records, 2011)
- The New International Sound of Hedonism (CD, Bomber Music, 2012)
- The New International Sound of Hedonism (LP, Ring of Fire Records, 2012)
- O'Farrell (LP, Ring of Fire Records, 2013)
- O'Farrell (CD re-release, Ring of Fire Records, 2013)
- More Late Night Transmissions With... (CD re-release, Bomber Music, 2014)
- More Late Night Transmissions With... (LP re-release, Bomber Music, 2014)
- Basement Style (CD re-release, Ring of Fire Records, 2017)
- Basement Style (LP re-release, Ring of Fire Records, 2017)
- Basement Style (MC re-release, Ring of Fire Records, 2017)
- A Good Day for the Damned (Bomber Music, 2017)

== Videography/Singles ==
- "Final Solution" (2003)
- "Closing Time" (2007)
- "Here Come the Drums" (2012)
- "Fake Carreras" (2016)
- "Sweet Eurotrash" (2018)
- "Amsterdam" (2018)
