= Skarface =

Skarface is a French ska band that started in 1991.

Their music includes influences from ska, punk rock and other genres. They have produced one CD almost every year of their existence. They have performed more than 1,200 concerts, in countries such as Germany, Spain, Italy, Switzerland, United States and Canada.

== Discography ==
- Cheap Pounk Skaa! (1992)
- Hold Up In Skacity! (1993)
- Live, Panic & Chaos (1994)
- Sex, Scooters and R'N'R (1995)
- Skankuat Nec Mergitur (1996)
- Skuck Off! (1997)
- Full Fool Rules! (1998)
- Best & Next (1999)
- Last Music Warriors (2000)
- Merci (2002)
- Mythic Enemy No. 1 (2003)
- Longlife Legendary Bastards (2008)
