= Leo Moracchioli =

Norwegian musician (born 1978)

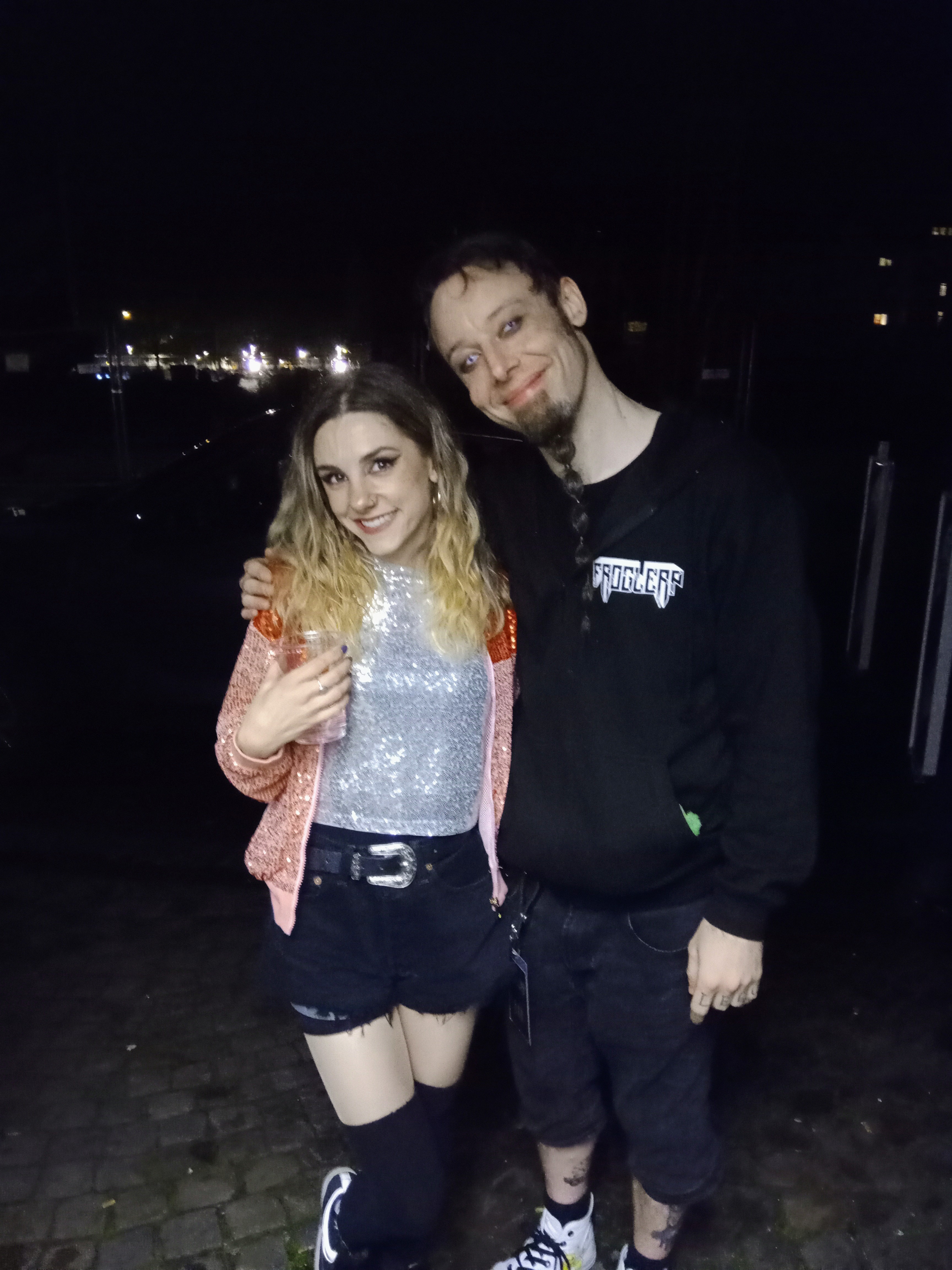
- Hannah Boulton and Leo Moracchioli in Saarbrücken, 2022

Background information
- Born: 10 October 1978 (age 47); Ålgård, Rogaland, Norway
- Genres: Heavy metal; groove metal; metalcore; alternative metal
- Occupations: Singer; record producer; guitarist; drummer
- Instruments: Vocals; guitar; drums; bass
- Member of: Frog Leap
- Website: frogleapstudios.com

Leo Moracchioli (born 10 October 1978 in Ålgård) is a Norwegian musician. He is known for his metal covers of popular songs, which have gained him over 4.5 million followers on YouTube as Frog Leap Studios.

== Career ==
Moracchioli has recorded over 400 covers, at a rate of approximately one per week, including covers of "Sultans of Swing" by Dire Straits, "Hello" by Adele, "Sail" by Awolnation, "Poker Face" and "Bad Romance" by Lady Gaga, "Feel Good Inc." by Gorillaz, "Chandelier" by Sia, "Africa" by Toto, "Redemption Song" by Bob Marley, "Old Town Road" by Lil Nas X, and many others. His cover of "Despacito" by Luis Fonsi peaked at number 35 on the Hungarian Single Top 40 chart on 10 August 2017. Moracchioli states that although he is playing covers, it is enough of a creative outlet for him to put his own spin on the songs. In addition to his metal covers, he also made an "acoustic" cover of "Duality" by metal band Slipknot, using slide whistles, timpani and tuba.

For each video, Moracchioli creates the arrangements, and plays all the instruments, except for a small number of songs in which he has collaborated with other instrumentalists; they often require at least 50 tracks. Although most of the videos feature only himself, and sometimes his family or a musical guest—sometimes a fellow YouTube artist participating remotely—for his video cover of Michael Jackson's "Thriller" he was joined by Drowning Pool guitarist C. J. Pierce. The video was filmed in a nightclub and included hired backup dancers.

He sometimes tours internationally with his band Frog Leap (studios). On 3 August 2019, he was at the 30th Anniversary of Wacken Open Air with the band.

The Frog Leap band members are Leo Moracchioli (vocals and guitar), Hannah Boulton (female vocals), Erik Torp (bass), Rabea Massaad (guitar), Truls Haugen (vocals and drums).

He is endorsed by TC Electronic. He was previously endorsed by Chapman Guitars.

== Personal life ==
Moracchioli was born to an Italian father and Norwegian mother.

He is divorced and had a daughter in 2011.
