= Kontrust =

Austrian crossover band

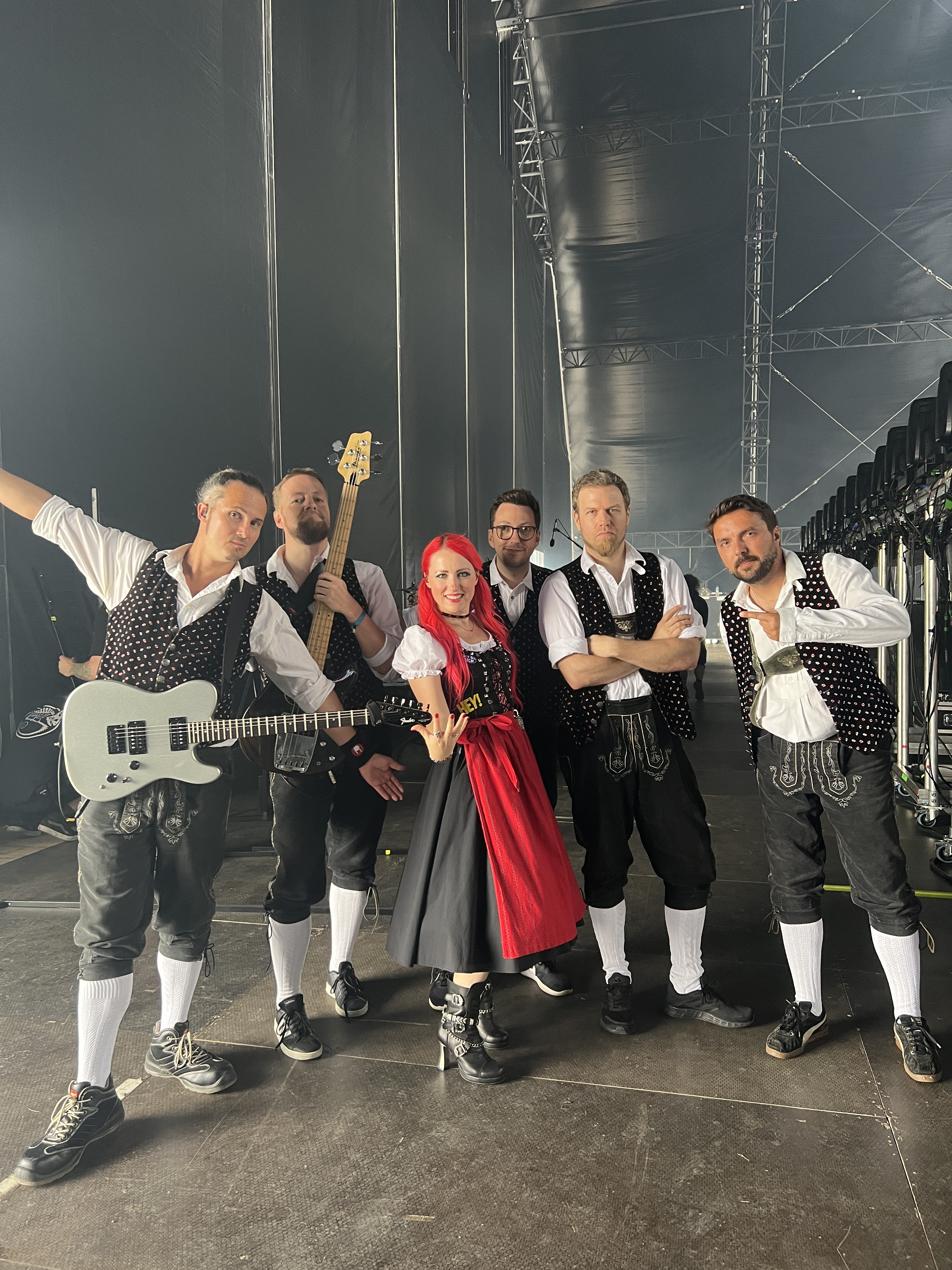
- Kontrust at Hellfest, France, 2022

Background information
- Origin: Austria
- Genres: Nu metal, crossover, dance-pop, folk metal
- Years active: 2001–present
- Members: Julia Ivanova (since 2022); Stefan Lichtenberger; Joey Sebald (since 2022); Gregor Kutschera; Manuel Haglmüller; Philipp Wolf (since 2025); Michael "Mike" Wolff (since 2011)
- Past members: Agata "Power" Jarosz (2005-2022); Roman Gaisböck (2001-2022); Robert Ehgartner (2001-2014)
- Website: www.kontrust.info

Kontrust is an Austrian crossover band formed in 2001. The band is famous for wearing lederhosen and their lyrics are predominantly in English, though German and Polish language have also been incorporated into some songs.

== History ==
In 2006 the band won the Austrian Newcomer Award, made their first music video for the song "Phono Sapiens" and played at the freeride- and snowcross-competition Vertical Extreme.

Their second album, Time To Tango, was released on June 19, 2009 in Austria. "The Smash Song" was the first single off the album. Their song "Bomba" landed them a spot in the Dutch charts and was the number one downloaded rock song on the Dutch iTunes Store.

In 2010 Kontrust was awarded with the Amadeus Austrian Music Award (category Hard & Heavy). They played at the 2011 Przystanek Woodstock and were requested by Jerzy Owsiak to play "Bomba" a second time as an unscheduled encore. According to official information over 300,000 visitors saw Kontrust's performance making it the most attended gig of an Austrian artist up to now.

On May 4, 2012 Kontrust released their 3rd studio album Second Hand Wonderland via Napalm Records. The album entered the Austrian charts on May 11 and peaked at number 25, where it remained for a total of two weeks. Singles released of the album included "Sock 'n' Doll", "Butterfly Defect" and "Hey DJ".

On November 7, 2014 Kontrust released their fourth studio album Explositive again via Napalm Records. The album entered the Austrian charts on November 21 and peaked at number 42, where it remained for a total of one week. The first single released of the album was "Just Propaganda", followed by "Dance"

In June 2022 the band announced a change in their line-up via their social channels as the new singer Julia Ivanova and drummer Joey Sebald joined the band and replaced Agata and Roman. In April 2023, Time to Tango was remastered and re-released on music streaming services.

In 2023, Kontrust announced the completion of their fifth album overall, madworld. The band released three singles prior to the album's release: "i physically like you", "the end" and "lederhosen overkill".

Released via Napalm Records, madworld entered the Austrian charts on November 14, 2023 at number 4 and held that position for one week.

On 30 September 2025, Kontrust released the single "I Like to Move It", a cover of the 1994 Reel 2 Real hit, through Napalm Records, accompanied by an official music video. On 23 October 2026, the band followed with a cover of the House of Pain song "Jump Around", released with a music video.

In January 2026, former Kontrust members Agata Jarosz, Roman Gaisböck and Robert Ehgartner founded the band Agata Power together with Arne Neurand, who had previously worked as a producer for Kontrust.

== Discography ==
=== Albums ===
#	Title	Year
1	We!come Home	2005
2	Time To Tango	2009
3	Second Hand Wonderland	2012
4	Explositive	2014
5	madworld	2023

=== EPs and Singles ===
#	Title	Year
1	Teamspirit 55 (EP)	2001
2	Make Me Blind (EP)	2003
3	Phonosapiens (Single)	2006
4	Go (Single)	2008
5	The Smash Song (Single)	2009
6	Bomba (Single)	2009
7	On The Run (Single)	2010
8	Zero (Single)	2011
9	Czas na Tango (MP3 download)	2011
10	i physically like you (Single)	2023
11	the end (Single)	2023
12	lederhosen overkill (Single)	2023
13	I Like To Move It (Single)	2025
14	Jump Around (Single)	2026

=== Video ===
#	Title	Year	Director	Album
1	"Phonosapiens"	2006	Florian Neiss	We!come Home
2	"The Smash Song"	2009	-	Time To Tango
3	"Bomba"	2009	-	Time To Tango
4	"On The Run"	2010	-	Time To Tango
5	"Zero"	2010	-	Time To Tango
6	"Sock n' Doll"	2012	-	Second Hand Wonderland
7	"The Butterfly Defect"	2012	-	Second Hand Wonderland
8	"Hey DJ!"	2013	-	Second Hand Wonderland
9	"Just Propaganda"	2014	-	Explositive
10	"Dance"	2016	-	Explositive
11	"i physically like you"	2023	-	madworld
12	"the end"	2023	-	madworld
13	"lederhosen overkill"	2023	-	madworld
14	"I Like To Move It"	2025	-	non-album single
15	"Jump Around"	2026	Georg Rabengruber	non-album single
