= Seiler und Speer =

Austrian band

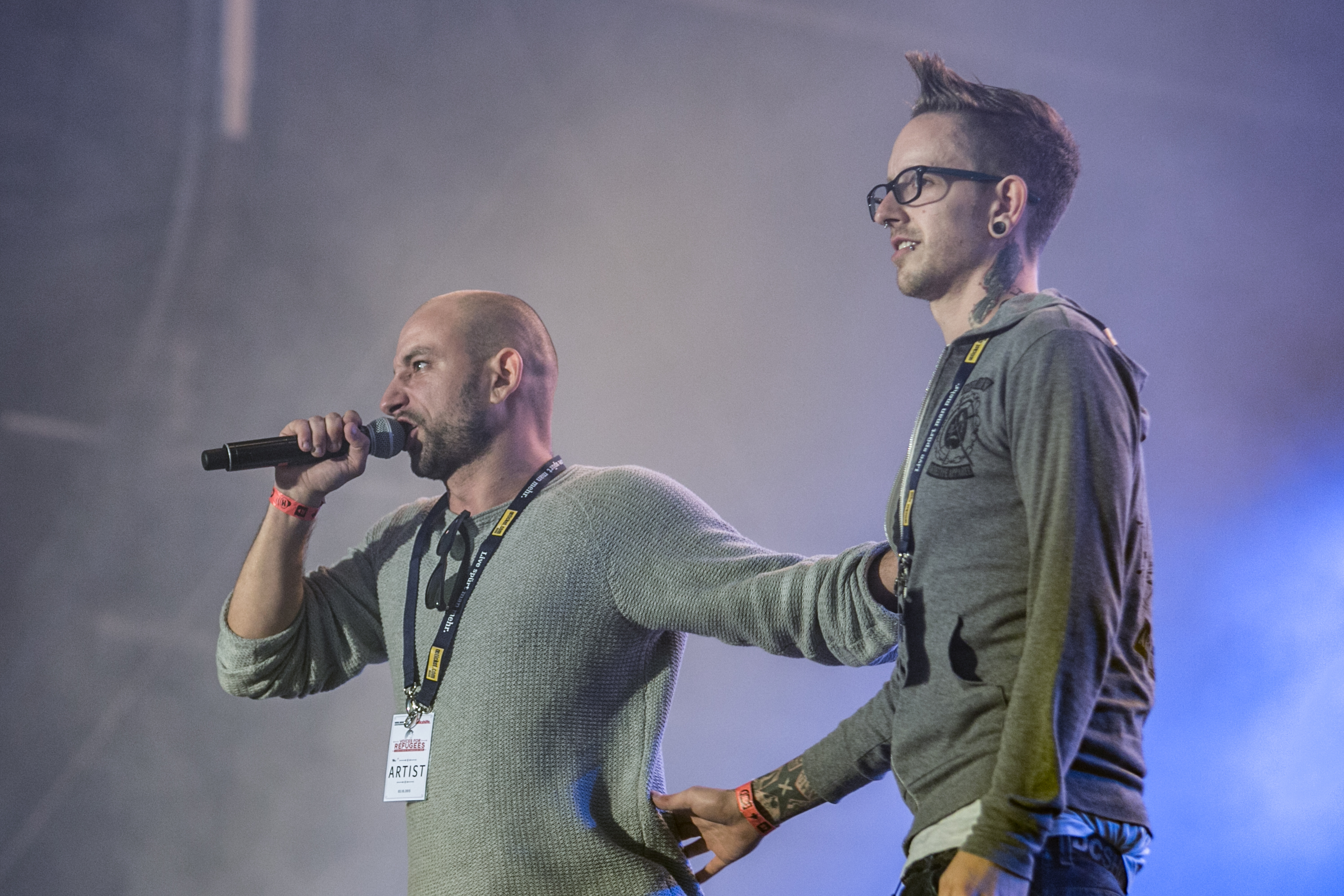
Seiler and Speer (2015)

Seiler und Speer is an Austrian band from Bad Vöslau that formed in 2014. The band is composed of comedian and actor Christopher Seiler and film producer Bernhard Speer.

== History ==
Both artists started their collaboration in 2014, when Christopher Seiler started his project "Schichtwechsel" (change of shifts). Bernhard Speer was producer and director. Christopher Seiler performed his first cabaret displays and wanted to accompany them with music.

The texts, sung in Austrian dialect, caricature various situations out of daily life with Austrian humor. What was only intended to be a humorous project in the beginning grew into a first album.

Seiler and Speer performed in front of 100,000 attendees at a concert for solidarity for asylum seekers at Heldenplatz, Vienna. They received a gold record for 7,500 units sold in October 2015. In December 2015, they received a platinum certification for 15,000. The mix of romanticism, everyday comical situations and popular songs became a success.

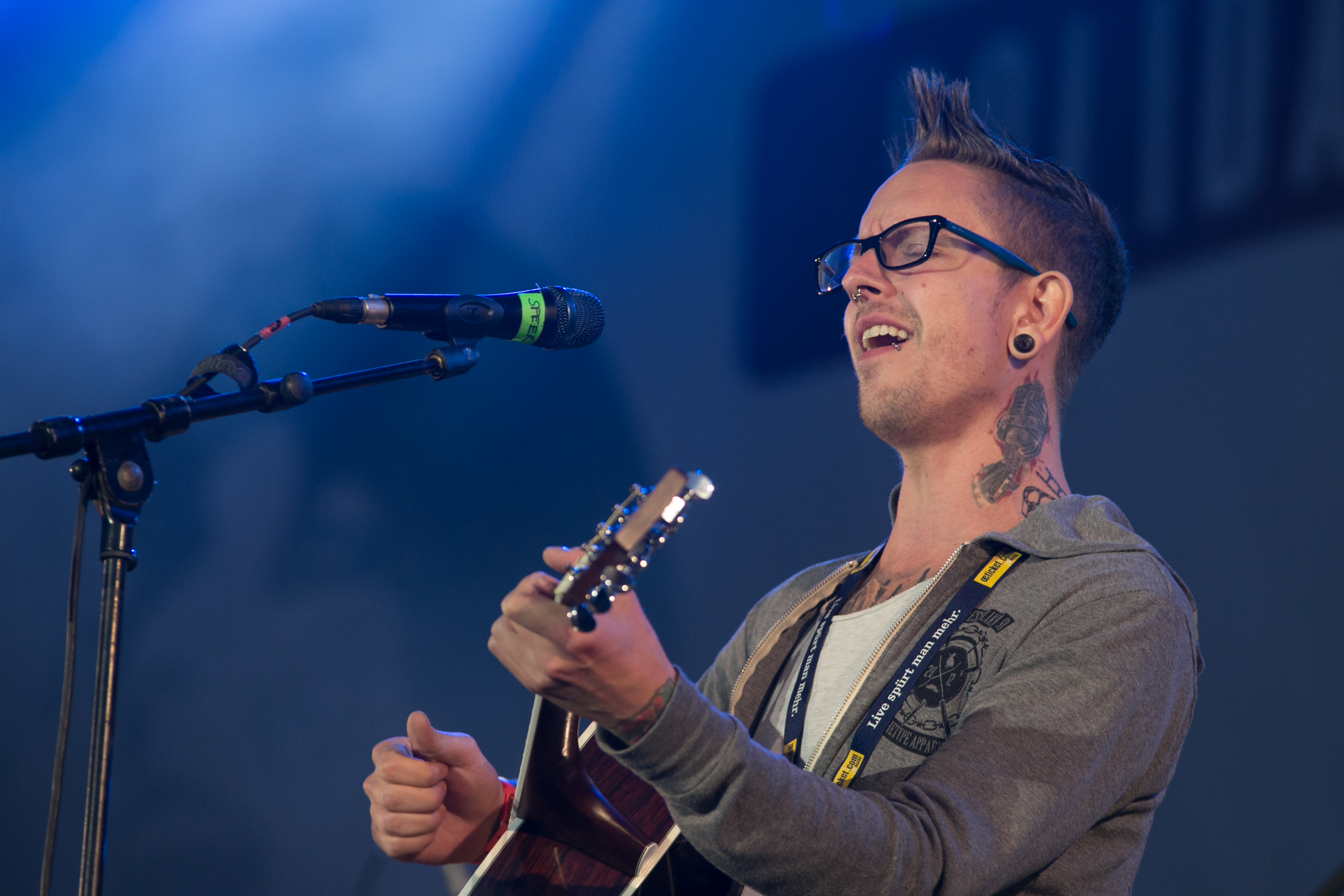
Bernhard Speer (2015)

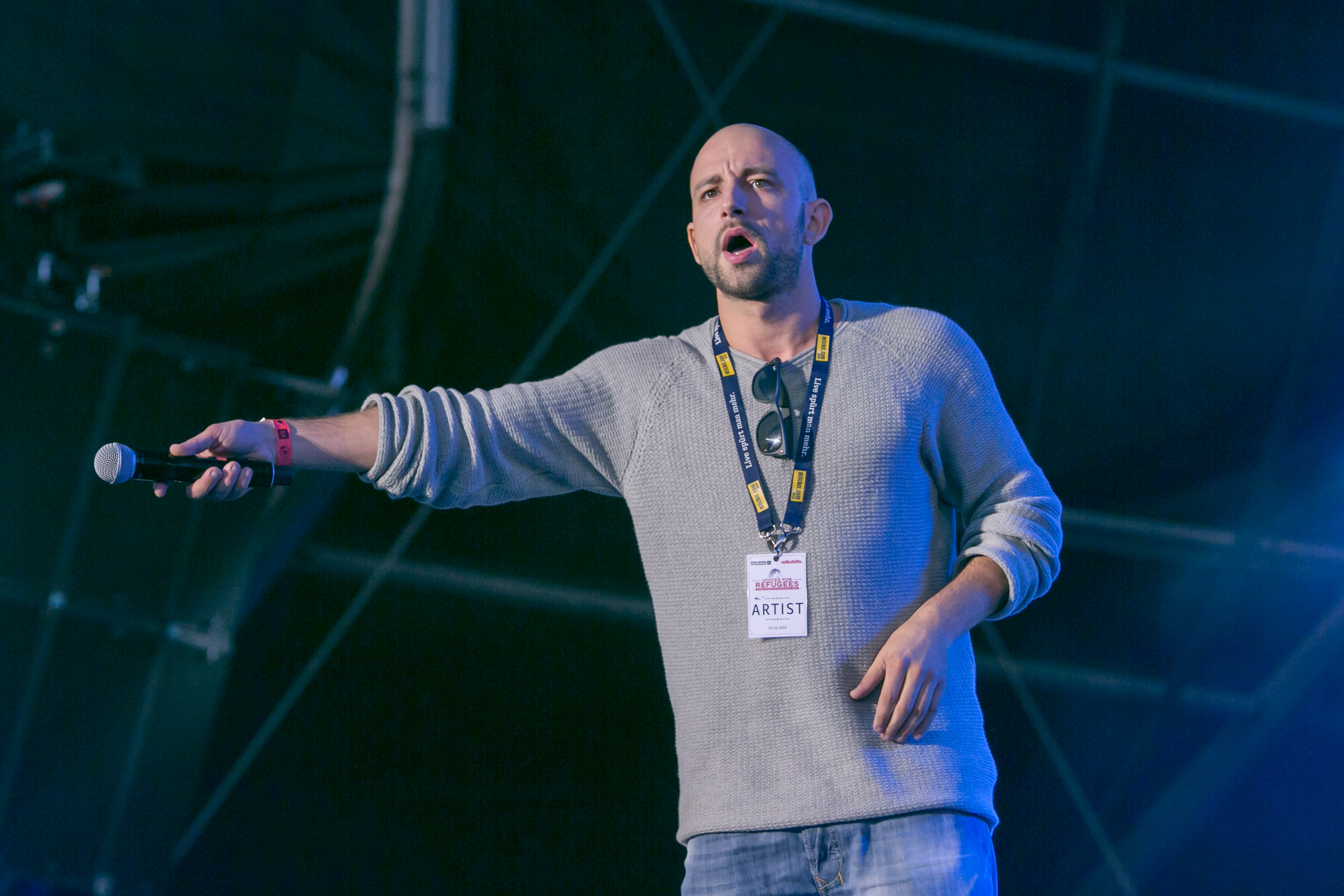
Christopher Seiler (2015)

== Horvathslos ==
Anton Horvath is a fictional character, performed by Christopher Seiler in the comedy video series "Horvathslos" created by Seiler und Speer. Horvath is an ever-unemployed drunkard with an oversized ego, who often lies about himself to make himself seem more impressive. Bernhard Speer plays the role of a reporter filming a documentary about Horvath. The series consists of two seasons, each with eight episodes. Only the first five episodes of the first season may be viewed for free online. The rest are only available on DVD by Preiser Records.

== Discography ==
=== Albums ===
Title	Album details	Peak positions		
Title	Album details	AUT	GER	SWI
Ham kummst	Released: 17 April 2015; Label: Preiser	1	31	—
Und weida?	Released: 7 April 2017; Label: Preiser	1	27	97
Für immer	Released: 26 July 2019; Label: Preiser	1	14	56
Red Bull Symphonic (with Christian Kolonovits & the Max Steiner Orchester)	Released: 3 June 2022; Label: Preiser	2	—	—
Hödn	Released: 3 June 2025; Label: Preiser	1	68	—

=== Singles ===
Title	Year	Peak chart positions		Album
Title	Year	AUT	GER	Album
"Der letzte Schnee"	2014	—	—	Ham kummst
"I wü ned"	2014	27	—	Ham kummst
"Ham kummst"	2015	1	45	Ham kummst
"Soits leben"	2015	10	—	Ham kummst
"Stopp doch die Zeit"	2016	40	—	Ham kummst
"I kenn di vo wo"	2016	3	—	Und weida?
"I Was Made"	2017	34	—	Und weida?
"All Inclusive"	2017	74	—	Und weida?
"Ob und zua"	2017	6	—	Non-album single
"Ois Ok"	2018	50	—	Für immer
"Ala bin"	2018	2	—	Für immer
"Herr Inspektor"	2019	12	—	Für immer
"Weust a Mensch bist"	2019	28	—	Für immer
"Oft host a Pech"	2020	62	—	Non-album single
"Principessa"	2020	26	—	Für immer
"Hödn"	2021	20	—	Non-album singles
"Waun da Wind geht"	2022	63	—	Non-album singles
"Irgendwie"	2024	40	—	Non-album singles
"In ana aundan Sproch..."	2025	35	—	Non-album singles
