= Wanda (band) =

Austrian indie pop band

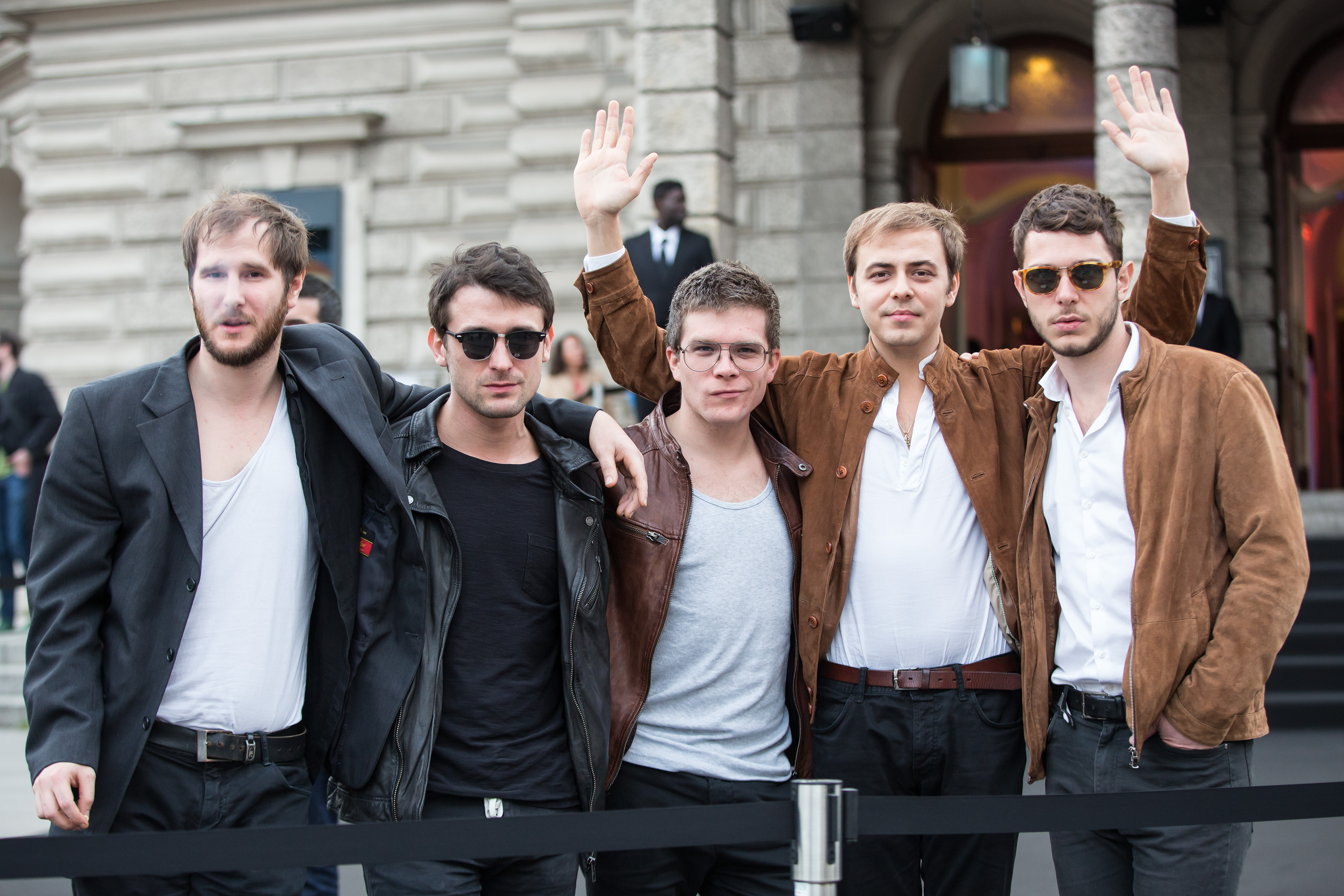
- Wanda (2016)

Background information
- Origin: Vienna, Austria
- Genres: Indie rock, pop, rock 'n' roll
- Years active: 2012–present
- Members: Michael Marco Fitzthum; Manuel Christoph Poppe; Reinhold Weber
- Past members: Lukas Hasitschka; Christian Hummer († 2022); Valentin „Vali“ Wegscheider
- Website: wandamusik.com

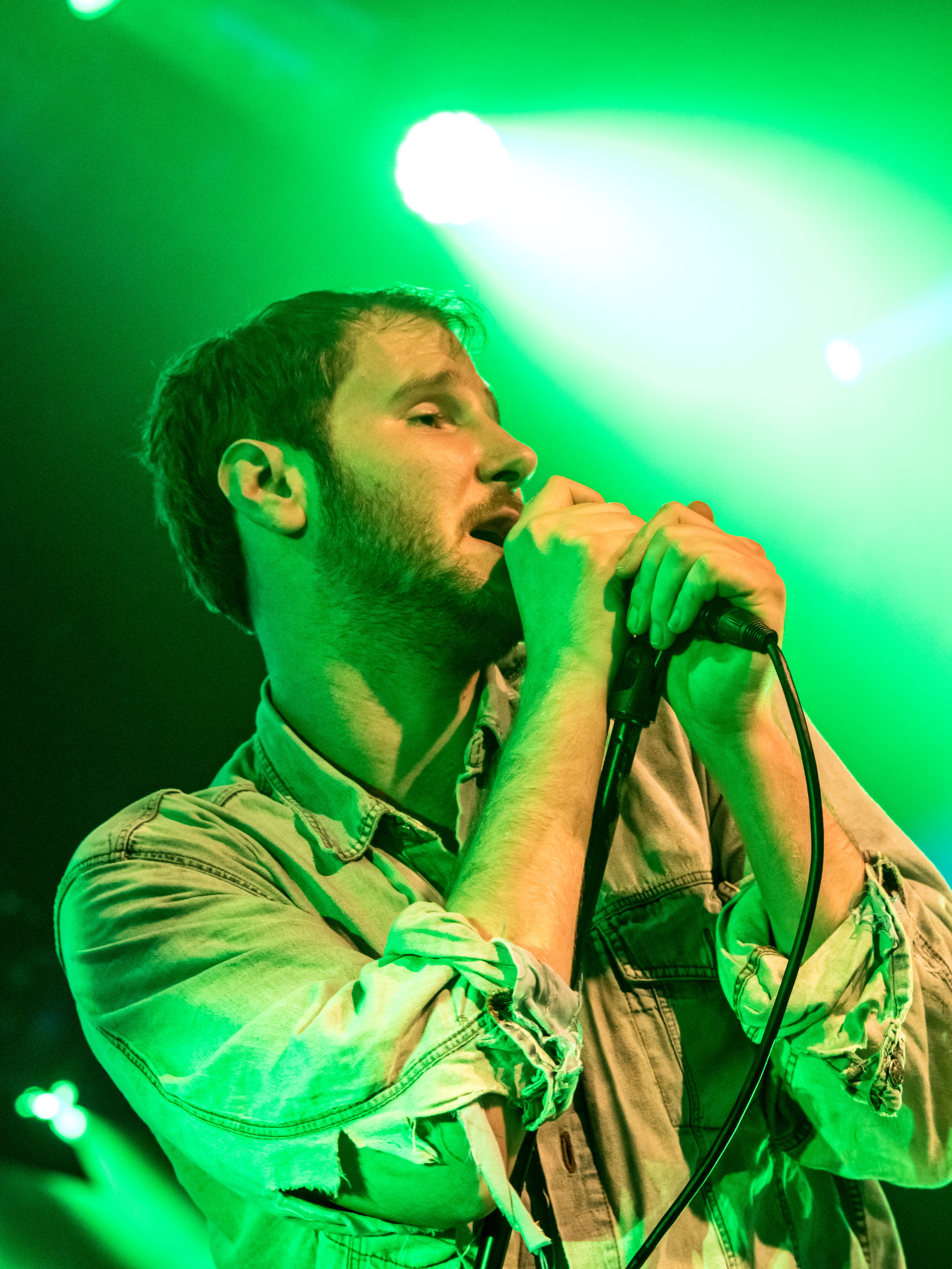
Zelt-Musik-Festival 2016 in Freiburg, Germany

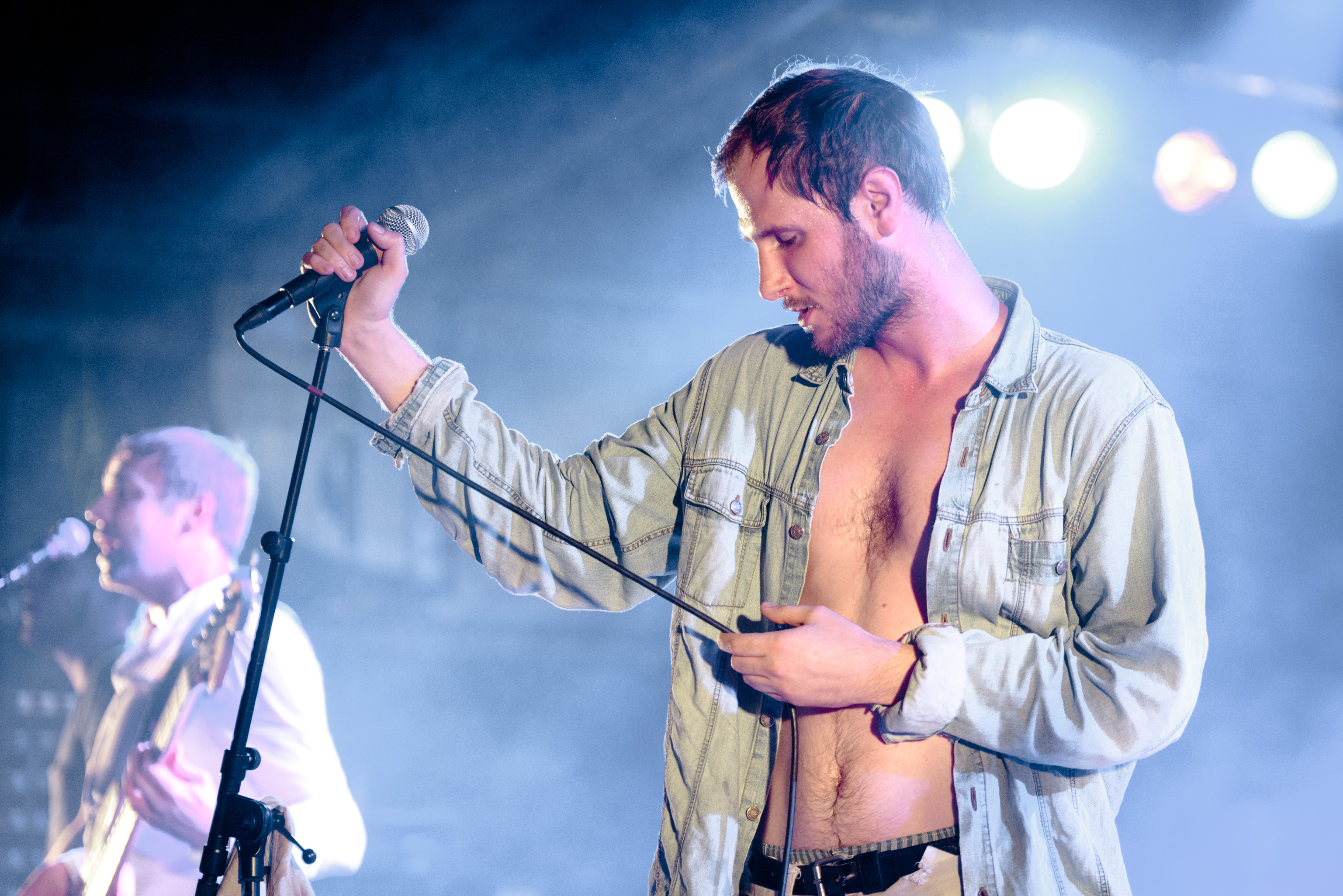
Wanda Live @ Free & Easy Festival 2015

Wanda is an Austrian indie pop band founded in Vienna in 2012.

Their debut album Amore was released in October 2014 at Problembär Records and debuted at number 13 on the Austrian Albums Chart on 31 October 2014. Their single "Bologna" (which features that Italian city) was released in early 2015 and peaked at number 42 on 10 April 2015. Wanda's first tour took place in late 2014, with a second tour in February 2015, with locations in Austria, Germany, and Switzerland (i.e. the German Sprachraum). On 2 October 2015 their second album Bussi was released. They made a deal with Universal Music Germany.

Their indie pop style is influenced by rock 'n' roll, as well as Austropop (Austrian singer-songwriters). They label their music as "pop music with 'Amore'". Their songs are sung in German, with a noticeable Viennese accent.

In August of 2020 drummer Lukas Hasitschka left the band. He was replaced by Valentin Wegscheider who was a founding member of the band, but left before major success. Valentin Wegscheider left the band in December, 2023.

Keyboarder Christian Hummer died on 26 September 2022, after a long and severe illness.

== Discography ==
=== Albums ===
Studio

Year	Title	Chart		
Year	Title	AUT	GER	SWI
2014	Amore	2	53	29
2015	Bussi	1	5	8
2017	Niente	1	5	6
2019	Ciao!	1	4	20
2022	Wanda	2	3	22
2024	Ende nie	1	5	17

Live

Year	Title	Chart		
Year	Title	AUT	GER	SWI
2016	Amore meine Stadt	11	66	—

=== Singles ===
Year	Title	Chart			Album
Year	Title	AUT	GER	SWI	Album
2014	"Schickt mir die Post"	—	—	—	Amore
2014	"Auseinandergehen ist schwer"	70	—	—	Amore
2015	"Bologna"	34	—	67	Amore
2015	"Stehengelassene Weinflaschen"	—	—	—	Amore
2015	"Bussi Baby"	3	—	—	Bussi
2015	"Meine beiden Schwestern"	28	—	—	Bussi
2015	"1,2,3,4"	61	—	—	Bussi
2016	"Gib mir alles"	—	—	—	Bussi
2016	"Gib mir alles (Live)"	—	—	—	Amore meine Stadt
2017	"0043"	63	—	—	Niente
2017	"Columbo"	1	—	—	Niente
2017	"Lascia mi fare"	68	—	—	Niente
2018	"Weiter, Weiter"	52	—	—	Niente
2019	"Ciao Baby"	46	—	—	Ciao!
2019	"Nach Hause gehen"	—	—	—	Ciao!
2020	"Nix reparieren"	—	—	—	Ciao!
2020	"Jurassic Park"	69	—	—	Wanda
2021	"Die Sterne von Alterlaa"	—	—	—	Wanda
2022	"Rocking in Wien"	—	—	—	Wanda
2022	"Va bene"	—	—	—	Wanda
2022	"Wir sind verloren"	—	—	—	Wanda
2022	"Eine Gang"	—	—	—	Wanda

== See also ==
- List of Austrians in music
