= List of songs about animal rights =

Animal rights has been a subject of both popular and independent music since the 1970s. Associated with the environmentalist musical counterculture of the previous decade, animal rights songs of the 1970s were influenced by the passage of animal protection laws and the 1975 book Animal Liberation. Paul McCartney has cited John Lennon's Bungalow Bill, released in 1968, as among the first animal rights songs.

Popular themes include anti-whaling (prompted by the Save the Whales movement), opposition to hunting, animal testing and vegetarianism. Bullfighting has been a prominent theme in Spain and some Latin American countries; while folk and pop music have traditionally identified with bullfighting traditions, several ska, rock and punk groups have emerged which oppose them.

Anarcho-punk and veganism have a long association dating back to the 1980s. During this period, American hardcore punk and straight edge scenes became increasingly concerned with animal rights, spawning the vegan straight edge and hardline punk ideologies. An increase in Animal Liberation Front activism in the 1990s corresponded with the rise of vegan straight edge and hardline bands. The more peaceful Krishnacore subgenre, which also advocates vegetarianism and animal rights, developed around this time too. The association between punk subculture and animal rights has continued in the 21st century, with vegan punk festivals including Fluff Fest in the Czech Republic and Verdurada in Brazil.

== List of songs about animal rights ==
| Song | Artist | Album | Themes | Year | Language | Ref. |
|---|---|---|---|---|---|---|
| "All the Good Girls Go to Hell" | Billie Eilish | When We All Fall Asleep, Where Do We Go? | Climate change | 2019 | English | |
| "40-year old Vegan" | Chokeules | Stay Up | Veganism | 2014 | English | |
| "A Life Embossed" | Protest the Hero | Volition | Opposition to legislations against specific dog breeds | 2013 | English | |
| "Acà toro" | Punkreas | Paranoia e potere | Anti-bullfighting | 1995 | Italian | |
| "Animal Grace" | Laura Nyro | Angel in the Dark | Animal rights | 2001 | English | |
| "Animal Kingdom" | Prince | The Truth | Veganism | 1998 | English | |
| "Animal Liberation" | Los Fastidios | Guardo avanti | Anti-animal testing, direct action | 2001 | Italian and English | |
| "Beat the Meat" | Good Clean Fun | On the Streets Saving the Scene From the Forces of Evil | Vegetarianism | 2000 | English | |
| "Behind the Mask" | Goldfinger | Disconnection Notice | Animal rights activism, veganism | 2005 | English | |
| "Blood Sports" | The Style Council | "Walls Come Tumbling Down!" | Anti-hunting, anti-animal blood sports | 1985 | English | |
| "Cats and Dogs" | Gorilla Biscuits | Start Today | Speciesism | 1989 | English | |
| "Civilized Man" | Shelter | Mantra | Vegetarianism | 1995 | English | |
| "Clams Have Feelings Too (Actually They Don't)" | NOFX | Pump Up the Valuum | Vegetarianism, ethics of eating seafood | 2000 | English | |
| "Consume & Kill" | Manliftingbanner | Ten Inches That Shook the World | Vegetarianism | 1992 | English and French | |
| "Cow" | Linda McCartney and Carla Lane | Wide Prairie | Vegetarianism | 1998 | English | |
| "Cruel Circus" | The Colourfield | Virgins and Philistines | Opposition to animal acts in circuses, anti-trophy hunting, anti-animal testing | 1985 | English | |
| "Cruelty to Animals" | Frenzal Rhomb | Forever Malcolm Young | Cruelty to animals | 2006 | English | |
| "Death Camps" | Cro-Mags | Best Wishes | Vegetarianism | 1989 | English | |
| "Don't Kill The Animals" | Nina Hagen and Lene Lovich | | | 1986 | English | |
| "Don't Kill the Whale" | Yes | Tormato | Anti-whaling | 1978 | English | |
| "Excuse Me" | The Decline | Are You Gonna Eat That? | Anti-animal testing | 2011 | English | |
| "Hats Off to the Bull" | Chevelle | Hats Off to the Bull | Anti-bullfighting | 2011 | English | |
| "Human(e) Meat (The Flensing of Sandor Katz)" | Propagandhi | Supporting Caste | Hypocrisy of ethical meat eating | 2009 | English | |
| "Hunters Will be Hunted" | Heaven Shall Burn | Veto (album) | Sea Shepherd Conservation Society, anti-whaling | 2013 | English | |
| "I Don't Eat Animals" | Melanie Safka | Leftover Wine | Vegetarianism | 1970 | English | |
| "Liberación Animal" | Chucho Merchán | El poder sagrado de la vida | Animal Rights, Animal Liberation | 2017 | Spanish | |
| "Looking for Changes" | Paul McCartney | Off the Ground | Anti-animal testing | 1993 | English | |
| "Long Leather Coat" | Paul McCartney | "Hope of Deliverance" | Anti-fur/leather | 1992 | English | |
| "Lower Order (A Good Laugh)" | Propagandhi | Victory Lap | Speciesism, Ethics of animal consumption | 2017 | English | |
| "Meat Is Murder" | The Smiths | Meat Is Murder | Against all types of meat eating. | 1985 | English | |
| "Men In Helicopters" | Adrian Belew | Young Lions | Anti-hunting, Anti-fishing, Anti-speciesism | 1990 | English | |
| "Nailing Descartes to the wall" | Propagandhi | Less Talk More Rock | For the end of the killing of animals for food. | 1996 | English | |
| "Panda" | Jefferson Airplane | Jefferson Airplane | Panda anti-hunting. | 1989 | English | |
| "Pink Convertible" | MARINA | Ancient Dreams in a Modern Land | Climate change | 2021 | English | |
| "Potemkin City Limits" | Propagandhi | Supporting Caste | Anti-animal husbandry, animal consciousness | 2009 | English | |
| "Puppies and Friends" | Atrophy | Violent by Nature | Animal rights | 1990 | English | |
| "Ravenous Medicine" | Voivod | Killing Technology | Animal cruelty, Animal testing | 1986 | English | |
| "San Fermín" | Attaque 77 | Amén! | Anti-bullfighting | 1995 | Spanish | |
| "Save the Whales!" | Country Joe McDonald | Paradise With an Ocean View | Anti-modern whaling | 1975 | English | |
| "Show Us You Care" | Icons of Filth | Onward Christian Soldiers | Anti-animal testing | 1984 | English | |
| "Shut Up Already" | NOFX | Liberal Animation | Anti-animal rights activism | 1988 | English | |
| "Skin" | Siouxsie and the Banshees | Kaleidoscope | Anti-fur/leather | 1980 | English | |
| "Small Black Flowers That Grow in the Sky" | Manic Street Preachers | Everything Must Go | Anti-zoos | 1996 | English | |
| "Song of the World's Last Whale" | Pete Seeger | At 89 | Anti-whaling | 1970 (Note: Pete Seeger composed "Song of the World's Last Whale" in 1970 and played it live, but did not officially record it until the album At 89 of 2008.) | English | |
| "The Bullfighter Dies" | Morrissey | World Peace Is None of Your Business | Anti-bullfighting | 2014 | English | |
| "TheHealingFields" | Bones | Powder | Veganism, anti-meat industry | 2015 | English | |
| "The Last Leviathan" | Sheena Wellington | Kerelaw | Anti-whaling | 1986 | English | |
| "The Slayer" | Refused | Songs to Fan the Flames of Discontent | Slaughter, Selfishness, cruelty to animals | 1996 | English | |
| "To the Last Whale..." | Crosby & Nash | Wind on the Water | Anti-whaling | 1975 | English | |
| "Vergüenza" | Ska-P | Planeta Eskoria | Anti-bullfighting | 2000 | Spanish | |
| "Voice of the Voiceless" | Heaven Shall Burn | Antigone | Animal rights | 2004 | English | |
| "Waste" | Good Riddance | Ballads from the Revolution | Ethics of eating meat | 1998 | English | |
| "Wild Life" | Paul McCartney and Wings | Wild Life | Opposition to anthropization that affects wildlife | 1971 | English | |
| "Without A Choice" | Useless ID | State Is Burning | Animal rights | 2016 | English | |

== See also ==
- List of vegan media
- List of animal rights advocates
