= Rock for People =

Czech music festival

- Genre: Hard rock, heavy metal, punk, metalcore, indie rock and many more
- Dates: First half of June; 4 days
- Frequency: Annually
- Locations: Český Brod (1995–2006); Věkoše Airport, Hradec Králové (2007–present)
- Country: Czech Republic
- Years active: 31
- Inaugurated: 19 August 1995
- Founders: Michal Thomes, Petr Fořt
- Next event: 10–14 June 2026
- Website: www.rockforpeople.com

Rock for People (RfP) is a large open-air summer multi-genre festival in the Czech Republic. The festival began in 1995 in the town of Český Brod. In 2007, it was moved to an unused airport in Hradec Králové. Headlining acts have included Muse, Green Day, Slipknot, Linkin Park, Bring Me The Horizon, My Chemical Romance, the Offspring, the Killers and many more.

== History ==
=== Český Brod ===
- In 1995, the festival was held on 19 August, and attracted 1100 visitors to watch 18 bands.
- In 1996, the festival was held on 29 June, and attracted 1600 visitors to watch 17 bands.
- In 1997, the festival was held over two days for the first time, from 4–5 July, and consisted of 44 bands, with 2300 attendees.
- In 1998, the festival expanded to three days, from 4–6 July, with 104 bands and 3800 visitors.
- In 1999, the festival took place from 3–5 July, with 5000 visitors watching 90 bands, including Guano Apes, Tagada Jones, Terry Lee Hale, Calico Soul, and Tribal Drift.
- In 2000, the festival took place from 4–6 July, with 7500 visitors watching 82 bands, including The Bloodhound Gang, In Extremo, Zion Train, and Burroughs Chris.
- In 2001 the festival took place from 5–7 July, with 9000 visitors watching 92 bands, including Apocalyptica, Mike Patton & Fantomas, Asian Dub Foundation, Sri, Shelter, Ex Girl, Tanzwut, Tahiti 80, Defdaf, Terrorgruppe, Calico Soul, New Model Army, and Xaver Fischer Trio.
- In 2002 the festival took place from 4–6 July, with 12,000 visitors watching 120 bands, including Chumbawamba, Transglobal Underground, Biohazard, Dead Kennedys, and Die Happy.
- In 2003, the festival was held over four days for the first time, and the line-up included 130 bands, including Cypress Hill, The Levellers, Therapy?, Madball, Donots, Junkie XL, Modena City Ramblers, and 4Lyn.
- In 2004, the festival took place from 3–5 July, with 15,000 visitors watching 170 bands, including Ska-P, Hooverphonic, Fun-Da-Mental, Värttinä, and Ill Nino.
- In 2005, the festival took place from 3–6 July, and the line-up included 127 bands, including Garbage, Die Toten Hosen, and Leningrad Cowboys.
- In 2006, the festival took place from 4–6 July, with 20,000 visitors watching 112 bands, including Manu Chao, Fun Lovin' Criminals, Radio Bemba Sound System, Agnostic Front, Madball, Mattafix, The Frames, Los De Abajo, Gocoo, Mad Sin, Deadline, and Mad Heads XL.

=== Hradec Králové ===
==== 2007 ====
- 3–6 July (20,000 visitors, 127 bands)
  - Line Up: The Killers, The Hives, Sick of It All, Basement Jaxx, Flipsyde, Mory Kanté, Toy Dolls, The Levellers, Walls of Jericho, Front Line Assembly, Nomeansno, Die Happy, The Locos, Disco Ensemble, Karamelo Santo, Extra Action Marching Band, Zeroscape and others.

==== 2008 ====
- 2–5 July (25,000 visitors, 150 bands)
  - Line Up: The Offspring, Kaiser Chiefs, Massive Attack, Helmet, Enter Shikari, Flogging Molly, The Locos, Madball, Dreadzone, H_{2}O, Black Mountain, iO, Watcha Clan, Panteón Rococó, Donots, Holy Fuck, VNV Nation, Demented Are Go, Empyr, Seth Lakeman, Park Avenue, Skop, Montreal, Hopes Die Last, Karras, Tremore and others.

==== 2009 ====
- 3–6 July (27,000 visitors, 130 bands)
  - Line Up: Arctic Monkeys, Placebo, Ska-P, Bloc Party, Underworld, Gogol Bordello, Static-X, Therapy?, Freestylers, Hadouken!, The Kooks, Mucky Pup, Ignite, Comeback Kid, The Bouncing Souls, Fancy, Firewater, 7 Weeks, Expatriate, Gocoo, Keziah Jones, Defeater (band), Black President, Ra:IN and others.

==== 2010 ====
- 3–6 July (28,500 visitors, 170 bands)
  - Line Up: Muse, The Prodigy, NOFX, Editors, Billy Talent, Morcheeba, Skunk Anansie, The Subways, Tricky, Alexisonfire, Suicidal Tendencies, Juliette Lewis, Archive, Gallows, Skindred, Coheed and Cambria, Death by Stereo, Does It Offend You, Yeah?, Evergreen Terrace, Jello Biafra And The Guantanamo School Of Medicine, Disco Ensemble, Wisdom in Chains, Dreadzone, Horse the Band, The Inspector Cluzo, Doping Panda, The Mahones and others.

==== 2011 ====
- 2–5 July (28,000 visitors, 146 bands)
  - Line Up: Paramore, Pendulum, My Chemical Romance, Bullet for My Valentine, The Streets, Sum 41, Parkway Drive, Beatsteaks, White Lies, Digitalism, Primus, Anberlin, Jimmy Eat World, The Wombats, John Butler Trio, The Qemists, Kele, Tokyo Ska Paradise Orchestra, Protest The Hero, Bright Eyes, US Bombs, The Levellers, Deez Nuts, Molotov, Title Fight, Cancer Bats, Destine, Jenny and Johnny, Your Demise and others.

==== 2012 ====
- The 2012 event was held from 3–6 July. It featured Franz Ferdinand, Skrillex, The Prodigy and The Kooks.

==== 2013 ====
- 2–5 July (30,000 visitors, 200 bands)
  - Line up: Thirty Seconds to Mars, Queens of the Stone Age, Foals, Parov Stelar Band, Billy Talent, Bloc Party, Gogol Bordello, Charlie Straight, Klaxons, Kryštof, Modestep, Papa Roach, Pražský výběr, The Gaslight Anthem, Xindl X, A Day to Remember, The Devil Wears Prada, Aneta Langerová, Borgore, Pipes and Pints, Royal Republic, Heart in Hand, Boris Carloff, Dubioza kolektiv, Friska Viljor, Hacktivist, Jan Budař a Eliščin Band, Skyline, Sto zvířat, Sunshine, Deathgaze, Karel Gott and others

==== 2014 ====
- 3–5 July
  - Line Up: Manu Chao, Biffy Clyro, Lucie, Madness, Chase & Status, The Naked and Famous, Netsky, Tom Odell, Asian Dub Foundation, Steven Seagal, The Afghan Whigs, We Came As Romans, Deap Vally, Emmure, Kadebostany, Molotov Jukebox, The Strypes, Thepetebox, 7 Weeks, Tricot and others.

==== 2015 ====
- 4–6 June
  - Line Up: Limp Bizkit, Faith No More, Three Days Grace, David Koller, Vojtěch Dyk, Asking Alexandria, Bastille, and others.

==== 2016 ====
- 3–5 July
  - Lineup: Massive Attack, The Offspring, Bullet for My Valentine, Five Finger Death Punch, Chvrches, The 1975, Enter Shikari, Royal Republic, Saul Williams, Roni Size, Anti-Flag, Ho99o9, X Ambassadors and others.

==== 2017 ====
- 4–6 July
  - Lineup: Paramore, Die Antwoord, Evanescence, Foster the People, Mastodon, Three Days Grace, Cage the Elephant, The Bloody Beetroots, Dub FX, You Me at Six, Thurston Moore Group and others.

==== 2018 ====
- 4–6 July
  - Lineup: The Prodigy, Volbeat, Enter Shikari, The Kooks, Skillet, Rodriguez, Marmozets, The Vaccines, Beatsteaks, Sick Puppies, Blossoms, Stick to Your Guns, Stray from the Path, Zeal & Ardor, Ho99o9, Albert Hammond Jr. and others.

==== 2019 ====
- 4–6 July
  - Lineup: Bring Me the Horizon, Rudimental, Manic Street Preachers, Franz Ferdinand (band), In Flames, Kodaline, Flogging Molly, The Subways, Our Last Night, You Me at Six, TOMM¥ €A$H, Frank Iero & The Future Violents, and others.

==== 2020 - RFP Home ====
- 15–20 June
  - Lineup: Gaia Mesiah, Pokáč, Vypsaná Fixa, Kapitán Demo, John Wolfhooker and others performed remotely during the COVID-19 pandemic.

==== 2021 ====
- 13–14 August
  - Lineup: Mando Diao, Måneskin, The Hives, Missio, De Staat, Skynd, Leoniden, Imminence, Landmvrks, John Wolfhooker, RedZed, The Silver Spoons, Halflives, The Truth Is Out There, and others.

==== 2022 ====
- 15–18 June
  - Lineup: Green Day, Fall Out Boy, Royal Blood, Biffy Clyro, Weezer, Wolf Alice, Sum 41, Skillet, Idles, Yard Act and others.

==== 2023 ====
- 8–11 June
  - Lineup: Muse, Slipknot, Machine Gun Kelly, The 1975, Architects, Incubus, Simple Plan, Billy Talent, Hollywood Undead, Papa Roach, Nothing but Thieves, I Prevail, X Ambassadors and others.

==== 2024 ====
- 12–15 June
  - Lineup: The Prodigy, The Offspring, Bring Me the Horizon, Yungblud, P.O.D., Avril Lavigne, Sum 41, Corey Taylor, Parkway Drive, and others.

==== 2025 ====
- 11–15 June
  - Lineup: Avenged Sevenfold, Slipknot, Sex Pistols ft. Frank Carter, Linkin Park, Guns N' Roses, Awolnation, Biffy Clyro, Fontaines D.C., Grandson, Idles, In Flames, Jerry Cantrell, Kneecap and others.

==== 2026 ====
- 10–14 June
  - Lineup: Gorillaz, Limp Bizkit, Bring Me the Horizon, Halsey, Iron Maiden, Saxon, Alter Bridge, Nothing but Thieves, Within Temptation, Papa Roach, Megadeth, Three Days Grace and others
