= El Libertador =

El Libertador (Spanish for The Liberator) may refer to:

- Simón Bolívar (1783–1830), Venezuelan military and political leader
- El Libertador Air Base, a military airport and base in Venezuela
- El Libertador, Buenos Aires, a town in Buenos Aires, Argentina
- El Libertador station, a railway station on the Urquiza Line, Buenos Aires, Argentina
- "El libertador", a song by Ska-P from their 2008 album Lágrimas y gozos
- A summit in the Nevado de Cachi mountains of Argentina

== See also ==
- Libertador (disambiguation)
- Libertadores
