= Isterico =

Demo album by Punkreas
- Released: December 1990
- Recorded: 1990
- Genre: Punk rock
- Length: 17:58
- Label: DemoTape
- Producer: Autoproduct

Punkreas chronology
Isterico (1990)	United Rumors of Punkreas (1992)

Isterico (in English "Hysterical") is the first demo of the Italian punk rock band Punkreas. It was registered as the first record of the band in late 1990.

== Track listing ==
1. No Cops- 2:29
2. Isterico- 3:20
3. Persia - 2:22
4. Anarchia- 1:26
5. Antisocialism- 2:37
6. Funny - 1:26
7. Fegato Centenario - 2:04
8. Il vicino - 2:11

== Personnel ==
- Cippa - Vocals
- Noyse - Guitar
- Caludio - Guitar
- Paletta - Bass
- Mastino - Drums
