= Vegan Reich =

American hardcore punk band

- Origin: Laguna Beach, California, United States
- Genres: Hardcore punk; crossover thrash; metalcore
- Years active: 1986–1993, 1996, 1999, 2026–present
- Past members: Sean Muttaqi; Andy Hurley; Jon Ewing; Aaron S. Sergio Hernandez; Dom Ehling; Ray Titus; A.K.Ray
- Website: myspace.com/veganreich

Vegan Reich is an American hardcore punk band from Laguna Beach, California, United States, active from 1986 to 1999. Fronted by singer-songwriter Sean Muttaqi, the band was formerly identified with the controversial hardline subculture, a more militant tendency of the vegan straight edge movement.

Along with Raid, Vegan Reich were one of the most well-known bands to identify with hardline. Vegan Reich created the founding statement for the movement, in which they write of their attempted break with the straight edge and hardcore scenes.

== Members ==
- Sean Muttaqi – lead vocals, guitars, bass (1986–1992;1999)
- Andy Hurley – drums, percussion (1999)
- A.K.Ray - Bass (1999)
- Jon Ewing – drums (1988–1991)
- Aaron S. – drums (1986)
- Sergio Hernandez – bass (1989–1990)
- Dom Ehling – bass (1990–1992)
- Ray Titus – drums, percussion (1991–1992)

== Discography ==
- Hardline 7" EP (1990, Hardline Records)
- The Wrath Of God single tape (1992, Hardline Records)
- Vanguard best of CD/10" (1995, Uprising)
- Jihad 7" EP (1999, Uprising)

Compilation appearances

Year	Song	Album	Label	Format
1987	"Stop Talking – Start Revenging"	The A.L.F. Is Watching And There's No Place To Hide...	No Master's Voice Records	12"

== See also ==
- Animal rights and punk subculture
