= Falso =

Studio album by Punkreas
- Released: 2002
- Genre: Punk rock,
- Length: 37:58
- Label: Universal Latomo dischi

Punkreas chronology
Pelle (2000)	Falso (2002)	Quello che sei (2005)

Falso is the fourth studio album of the Italian band Punkreas, released in 2002.

== Track listing ==
1. Dividi e comanda - 3:50
2. Canapa - 3:23
3. Volare - 3:04
4. Elettrosmog - 3:12
5. Mondo proibito - 3:34
6. Più di voi - 3:15
7. W.T.O. (Viva il Terrorismo Organizzato) - 3:25
8. Falsa - 4:02
9. Gran galà - 3:11
10. Solo andata - 2:47
11. Toda la noche - 4:10
