= United Rumors of Punkreas =

Studio album by Punkreas
- Released: April 1992
- Recorded: 1992
- Genre: Punk rock
- Length: 22:41
- Label: T.V.O.R. on vinyl
- Producer: Autoproduct

Punkreas chronology
Isterico (1990)	United Rumors of Punkreas (1992)	Paranoia e potere (1995)

United Rumors of Punkreas is the first studio album of the Italian Punk-Rock band Punkreas, and also the first vinyl of the band.

== The vinyl ==
After the Demo Isterico, Punkreas registered their second album with the help of the independent label T.V.O.R. on vinyl in which all the '80s Italian Hardcore scene recognized their major groups such as Gli Indigesti, Peggio Punx and Crash Box. The Single "Occhi Puntati" will be one of the most played song in the band's concert for many years.

== Track listing ==
1. Occhi puntati - 3:05
2. Disgusto totale - 3:06
3. È ora di finirla - 2:16
4. Alterazione cerebrale - 2:53
5. Montezuma - 3:04
6. Intifada - 2:43
7. Skizo - 2:47
8. Il vicino - 2:44

== Personnel ==
- Cippa - Vocals
- Noyse - Guitar
- Flaco - Guitar
- Paletta - Bass
- Gagno - Drums
