= ¡¡Que corra la voz!! =

Studio album by Ska-P
- Released: 29 June 2002
- Recorded: 2002
- Studios: Studio RED LED, Madrid
- Genres: Ska punk, punk rock, ska, pop punk
- Length: 47:01
- Label: RCA
- Producer: Tony López

Ska-P chronology
Planeta Eskoria (2000)	¡¡Que corra la voz!! (2002)	Incontrolable (2004)

¡¡Que corra la voz!! is the fifth studio album by the Spanish ska punk band Ska-P, released on 29 June 2002.

The album's cover depicts Gato López with a megaphone and a medallion with the Anarchy symbol, bursting through the front page of a newspaper. The album title can be translated as "Spread the word!"

== Track listing ==
All tracks are written by Ska-P.

No.	Title	Length
1.	"Estampida"	3:23
2.	"Consumo Gusto"	3:58
3.	"Welcome to Hell"	4:11
4.	"Casposos"	4:59
5.	"Niño Soldado"	3:41
6.	"Intifada"	3:35
7.	"McDollar"	3:58
8.	"Solamente Por Pensar"	3:22
9.	"Insensibilidad"	4:36
10.	"Esquirol"	3:38
11.	"El Olvidado"	3:29
12.	"Mis Colegas"	4:11
Total length:		47:01

== Personnel ==
- Pulpul – vocals, guitar
- Luismi – drums
- Julio – bass
- Joxemi – guitar
- Kogote – keyboard
- Pipi – backing vocals

== Charts ==
Chart positions for ¡¡Que corra la voz!!
Chart	Peak
French Albums (SNEP)	21
Swiss Albums (Schweizer Hitparade)	84
