= El vals del obrero =

Studio album by Ska-P
- Released: 21 March 1996
- Recorded: August 1995, February 1996 at Studio Red Led, Madrid
- Genre: Ska punk
- Length: 44:29
- Label: RCA
- Producer: Toni López

Ska-P chronology
Ska-P (1994)	El vals del obrero (1996)	Eurosis (1998)

El vals del obrero is an album by the Spanish ska punk band Ska-P, released on 21 March 1996.

The album title means "The Worker's Waltz". The album cover depicts a typical Spanish "cacique", as a symbol of capitalism, amongst other things, with a fat cigar in one hand and manipulating a string puppet, dressed as a worker, with the other. The breast pocket of his jacket is stuffed with banknotes. He's also wearing ostentatious gold rings, cuff-links and a gold tie pin with the eagle which symbolised Francoist Spain.

== Track list ==
All tracks are written by Ska-P.

No.	Title	Length
1.	"El gato López"	2:40
2.	"Ñapa es"	2:31
3.	"El vals del obrero"	4:37
4.	"Revistas del corazón"	2:44
5.	"Romero el madero"	3:21
6.	"Sectas"	4:07
7.	"No te pares"	4:26
8.	"Cannabis"	4:24
9.	"Insecto urbano"	4:06
10.	"Animales de laboratorio"	4:45
11.	"La sesera no va"	3:30
12.	"Sexo y religión"	3:55
Total length:		44:29

== Certifications ==
Region	Certification	Certified units/sales
Spain (Promusicae)	2× Platinum	200,000^{^}
^{^} Shipments figures based on certification alone.

== Personnel ==
- Pulpul – vocals, guitar
- F. J. Navío – drums
- Julio – bass
- Joxemi – guitar
- Alberto J. Amado – keyboard
- Pipi – backing vocals
