= The Last Leviathan =

Song
- Published: 1980s
- Genre: English folk song
- Songwriter: Andy Barnes

"The Last Of The Great Whales / The Last Leviathan" is an anti-whaling English folk song which has been recorded by Sheena Wellington, Archie Fisher & Garnet Rogers, Louis Killen, Danny Spooner, Maz O'Connor, Melanie Harrold, Fraser Bruce, and David Carroll.

Andy Barnes has not spoken on record about what prompted the writing of this song, though it is thought to have been inspired by Scott McVay's 1966 article in Scientific American.

Being a well-documented song publicised by Mudcat, and Mainly Norfolk, the song was recorded by Jon Boden and Oli Steadman for inclusion in their respective lists of daily folk songs "A Folk Song a Day" and "365 Days Of Folk".
