= Eurosis =

Studio album by Ska-P
- Released: 28 April 1998
- Recorded: September 1997 – March 1998 at Studio Red Led, Madrid
- Genre: Ska punk
- Length: 48:20
- Label: RCA
- Producer: Toni López

Ska-P chronology
El vals del obrero (1996)	Eurosis (1998)	Planeta Eskoria (2000)

Eurosis is the third album by the Spanish ska punk band Ska-P, released on 28 April 1998. The album criticizes various bankers, politicians, and the Spanish King Juan Carlos I.

The album achieved a gold certification (50,000) copies in five days and platinum (100,000) in a month. With 180,000 sold copies, it is the second most sold album by the band, after El Vals del Obrero.

== Track list ==
All tracks are written by Ska-P.

No.	Title	Length
1.	"Circo ibérico"	3:43
2.	"Villancico"	4:08
3.	"España va bien"	4:52
4.	"Paramilitar"	3:55
5.	"Simpático holgazán"	4:04
6.	"Kémalo"	3:05
7.	"Poder pal pueblo"	3:19
8.	"Juan sin tierra"	2:58
9.	"Kacikes"	3:17
10.	"América Latina libre"	5:07
11.	"Al turrón"	3:48
12.	"Seguimos en pie"	5:53
Total length:		48:20

== Certifications ==
Region	Certification	Certified units/sales
Spain (Promusicae)	Platinum	100,000^{^}
^{^} Shipments figures based on certification alone.

== Personnel ==
- Pulpul – vocals, guitar
- Pako – drums
- Julio – bass
- Joxemi – guitar
- Kogote – keyboard
- Pipi – backing vocals
