= Incontrolable =

2003 live album

Live album by Ska-P
- Released: 3 November 2004
- Recorded: 2004
- Genre: Ska punk
- Length: CD: 73:28; DVD: 63:56
- Label: Sony BMG
- Producer: Tony López

Ska-P chronology
¡¡Que corra la voz!! (2002)	Incontrolable (2004)	Lágrimas y gozos (2008)

Incontrolable is an album by the Spanish ska punk band Ska-P. It was released in 2004 and recorded live in Switzerland, Italy and France. It also includes a DVD with 13 of the tracks from the album.

The cover depicts the band's fully laden tour bus being driven recklessly by Gato López, who is also "giving the claw", and smashing through a border control bar. A startled bald eagle (the national bird of the United States) has just managed to escape being hit. The title could be loosely translated either as "uncontrollable" or "out of control".

== Track list CD ==
All tracks are written by Ska-P.

No.	Title	Length
1.	"Estampida"	5:32
2.	"El Gato López"	2:44
3.	"Niño Soldado"	3:59
4.	"Planeta Eskoria"	4:36
5.	"Mestizaje"	4:33
6.	"Intifada"	3:43
7.	"Vals Del Obrero"	5:46
8.	"Mis Colegas"	4:16
9.	"Vergüenza"	4:24
10.	"Solamente Per Pensare (En Italiano)"	3:34
11.	"Romero El Madero"	4:52
12.	"Welcome to Hell"	4:36
13.	"A La Mierda"	4:07
14.	"Kasposos"	6:43
15.	"Paramilitar"	4:38
16.	"Cannabis"	5:25
Total length:		73:28

== Track list DVD ==
No.	Title	Length
1.	"Niño Soldado"
2.	"Tio Sam"
3.	"Gato Lopez"
4.	"Planeta Eskoria"
5.	"Vals Del Obrero"
6.	"Intifada"
7.	"Romero El Madero"
8.	"Welcome To Hell"
9.	"A La Mierda"
10.	"Sexo Y Religion"
11.	"Derecho De Admision"
12.	"Kasposos"
13.	"Cannabis"
14.	"BONUS: Videoclips"
Total length:		63:56

== Personnel ==
- Pulpul – vocals, guitar
- Luismi – drums
- Julio – bass
- Joxemi – guitar
- Kogote – keyboard
- Pipi – backing vocals
