= Hardline (subculture) =

Subculture that advocates a biocentric worldview

Hardline imagery using two M16 rifles in front of an "X", symbolising the straight edge lifestyle that the movement was branched from.

Hardline is a subculture that has its roots in the vegan straight edge hardcore punk scene. It is commonly viewed as a more extreme variant of straight edge, and incorporates elements of deep ecology and biocentric philosophy. Hardline adherents generally advocate abstinence from all recreational drugs, alcohol, tobacco, pharmaceutical and over the counter medicines, viewing pornography and use of animal-derived products, as well as the consumption of foods that are not considered completely natural. Some adherents also oppose sexual activity other than for purely procreative purpose. From its outset, hardline adherents put out statements and literature pushing a biocentric view of the world, which advocated for veganism, animal rights, anti-abortion, anti-homosexuality, and a much more militant version of the straight edge philosophy. The hardline worldview has been accused by critics as ecoauthoritarian. Hardline co-founder Sean Muttaqi adamantly rejected racism and fascism.

A handful of hardline bands existed, the most well known of which were Vegan Reich and Raid. Earth Crisis was loosely aligned with the subculture, but were not necessarily classified as a hardline band.

The heyday of hardline was in the early to mid-1990s when hardline chapters existed in a number of cities across the United States as well in the United Kingdom and Germany. However, by end of the 1990s, the subculture had mostly faded out of existence.

== Beliefs ==
The Hardline philosophy forbids its adherents from smoking or chewing any form of tobacco, drinking alcoholic beverages, and using illicit drugs or employing medicine. Hardliners (as they are called) are expected to follow a strict dietary regimen based on the above-mentioned pillars of respect for innocent life and the "natural order". Hardliners eat only foods that are vegan and relatively natural (e.g. brown rice over white, evaporated cane juice over granulated sugar, organic produce over conventional, natural oils over hydrogenated oils). Human rights issues are also factored into the movement's "food politics", and followers are urged to shun third-world cash crops such as coffee, chocolate, sugar, and most tropical fruits. Hardliners include caffeine in their stance on mind-altering drugs so the first two items are generally abstained from, but consumption of the last two is often given more leeway.

The sexual politics of the Hardline movement are very conservative. Sex is not allowed except for the reason of procreation; thus homosexuality is seen as anathema. Pornography and masturbation are abjured. The use of birth control is avoided, and the practice of abortion is militantly opposed. Although the Hardliner stance on sexual activity is that its natural purpose is purely procreative, many hardliners justify recreational sex within the context of committed relationships as potentially procreative by opting not to use contraception.

Hardline has always been highly syncretic (over time absorbing influences from Islam and a host of other schools of thought) and initially claimed a Taoist foundation for their sexual morals. This appeal to the orientation of the punk and hardcore scenes met with little success, and the topics of abortion and homosexuality have always been sources of tension between hardliners and their subcultural cousins.

== History ==
The hardline subculture grew out of the hardcore punk scene in the 1990s. In the early 1990s, Earth Crisis were one of the first bands to infuse hardcore punk music with strict vegan messaging, and their popularity influenced other bands to follow suit. Hardline began to attract followers shortly after the 1990 release of Vegan Reich's Hardline EP; shortly thereafter Vegan Reich, and in particular band member Sean Muttaqi, took active leadership in the emerging "Hardline" subculture. Other bands soon formed; the most notable of them being Raid from Tennessee. Another source credited as influencing the creation of Hardline was the militant animal rights group Animal Liberation Front, in operation since 1980.

Muttaqi has said that he was first exposed to the idea of fusing veganism and abstinence from drugs by an English punk named Rat of the band Statement. Rat had allegedly coined the term "vegan straight edge" by the mid-1980s. However, Rat was doing little to spread his ideology while Muttaqi was transforming and propagating it. Vegan Reich was for many in the hardcore scene their first exposure to ideas about militant animal liberation, and the controversy they aroused drew considerable attention to their positions. Those in the subculture who gravitated toward animal-related causes but disagreed with some of hardline's finer points found themselves becoming vegan straightedge. Vegan straightedge band Earth Crisis initially wanted Muttaqi to release their debut EP, All Out War on his record label, Uprising Records.

Sean Muttaqi, as editor of the zine Vanguard (hardline's official press organ), was able to exert ideological influence on the movement, and caused the center of its activities to become shifted to Tennessee. Many in the Memphis hardcore scene adopted Hardline stances and started editing magazines, organizing protests, engaging in direct action against industries that exploited animals, and otherwise acting on their new beliefs. Some of the most notable achievements of Memphis Hardline were organizing the movement's first annual gathering and founding the long-standing Coalition to Abolish the Fur Trade (CAFT). Hardliners were instrumental in CAFT, the Animal Defense League, and Vegans For Life. Some were also involved in Earth First!, anti-imperialist organizations, and other radical causes and groups.

As hardline came into its own, many hardliners decided that their philosophy was so beyond the narrow scene politics of straightedge that the two were entirely different things. The "X" was removed from the crossed rifles logo, straightedge was harshly criticized, and hardliners were encouraged to leave the hardcore scene. Much of this sprang from the momentum being gained by the more activist-oriented elements within the subculture. Eventually hardliners came to consider their network wholly divorced from the hardcore scene. However, the nature of information dissemination in a mostly pre-Internet media environment made recruiting from outside the hardcore subculture next to impossible. Although hardline served to involve people heavily in political activity, the overwhelming bulk of new members were straight-edgers who would with time come to identify primarily as activists instead of hardcore kids. Two of the more famous people associated with Hardline include Animal Liberation Front activist and former prisoner Walter Bond and Pete Wentz of Fall Out Boy

In the late 1990s some Hardliners from Massachusetts set out to establish an intentional community in Hawaii. The effort quickly failed due to personality conflicts (especially the ongoing debate among group members as to whether or not cooked food was natural enough) and a distinct lack of required agricultural and engineering skills. This self-defeating arc reflects tensions in similarly idealistic communes of the 1960s and 1970s during the hippie movement and the back-to-the-land movement.

In 1999, a number of punk groups in Salt Lake City, Utah, were designated as criminal gangs by law enforcement. In an internal report, the Salt Lake City Police Department noted three punk factions in the city; Straight Edge, Vegan Straight Edge, and Hardline, and suggested they were "pro-violence, and ... have been responsible for a high number of assaults, stabbings, and beatings in the Salt Lake metro area". That same year CBS News in Utah ran a report about a number of Salt Lake City Hardliners who had firebombed fast food outlets and clothing stores selling leather items, attributing 30 attacks to Hardliners.

As Hardline began to falter at the end of the 1990s, Muttaqi attempted to stabilise it by organising a "Hardline Central Committee" which would act as an official leadership body for Hardliners. However, this body was not able to stop the breaking apart of Hardline. In 1999, Muttaqi and former Hardliner Micah Collins (aka Adam Naziri) formed an Islamic-oriented group similar to Hardline named Ahl-i Allah (People of God) and, a few years later, this morphed into the nearly identical Taliyah al-Mahdi (Vanguard of the Messiah). Both groups existed primarily online, remained small, and had disappeared by 2006 (until Naziri resurrected the Taliyah website in 2020).

== See also ==
- Anarchism and animal rights
- Anarchism and Islam
- Animal rights and punk subculture
- Bioethics
- Consistent life ethic
- Deep ecology
- Ecocide
- Ecofascism
- Neo-Luddism
- Pro-life feminism
- Punk ideologies
- Straight edge
- Uprising Records
- Veganism

== Bibliography ==
- Haenfler, Ross (2006). Straight Edge: Hardcore Punk, Clean Living Youth, and Social Change. Rutgers University Press. ISBN 0-8135-3851-3.
- Kuhn, Gabriel (2010). Sober Living for the Revolution: Hardcore Punk, Straight Edge, and Radical Politics. PM Press. ISBN 978-1-60486-051-1.
- Wood, Robert T. (2006). Straight Edge Youth: The Complexity and Contradictions of a Subculture. Syracuse, NY: Syracuse University Press. ISBN 0-8156-3127-8.
- Pike, Sarah (2011). The Study of Children in Religion: A Methods Handbook. New York, N.Y.: New York University Press. ISBN 978-0-8147-7746-6.
- Eeyore, Phoenix X (2022). Total Revolution?: An Outsider History of Hardline. USA: Warcry Communications. ISBN 978-1-9574-5203-6.
