= 99% (Ska-P album) =

Studio album by Ska-P
- Released: 5 March 2013
- Recorded: 2012–2013 at Studio RED LED, Madrid
- Genres: Ska punk, pop punk, rock
- Length: 59:41
- Label: Warner Music
- Producer: Tony López

Ska-P chronology
Lágrimas y gozos (2008)	99% (2013)	TODO Ska-P (2013)

99% is the seventh studio album by the Spanish ska punk band Ska-P. It was released on 5 March 2013.

== Writing and production ==
The album is the second after the band's re-reunion in 2008. The title is a reference to power and union workers. The album features synthesizer and some influences of jazz music and ballad-esque intros.

== Track listing ==
All tracks are written by Ska-P.

No.	Title	Length
1.	"Full Gas"	3:10
2.	"Canto A La Rebelión"	4:39
3.	"Ciudadano Papagayo"	4:08
4.	"Pandemia, S.L."	4:03
5.	"Se Acabó"	4:10
6.	"Ska-Pa"	3:54
7.	"Marinaleda"	4:23
8.	"Alí Baba"	2:56
9.	"Victoria"	3:22
10.	"Bajo Vigilancia"	4:02
11.	"Maquis"	5:06
12.	"Oniomanos"	3:20
13.	"¿Quienes Sois?"	4:09
14.	"Radio Falacia"	3:21
15.	"Africa Agónica"	4:52
Total length:		59:41

== Personnel ==
- Pulpul – lead vocals, guitars, backing vocals
- Luismi – drums, backing vocals
- Julio – bass, backing vocals
- Joxemi – guitar, backing vocals
- Kogote – keyboards, backing vocals
- Pipi – second lead and backing vocals

=== Additional musicians ===
- Albert Pérez – trumpet
- Garikoizt Badiola – trombone
- Juanan Rivas Sabriega – trumpet and violin
- Jorge Rodrígez "Chino" – tenor and baritone saxophone

=== Additional personnel ===
- Tony López – producer
- Marisa Martín – executive producer and producing assistant
- Rubén Suárez – recording & sound engineer, mixing & mastering
- Alicia, Carolina & Erik: choir on "Ali Ba Ba"
- Gaby Magaña (Shaiko) – programming and "great ideas"
- Pipi & Maki – band pictures
- Vizcarra – illustrations

== Release history ==
Region	Date	Label	Format	Catalog
Spain	5 March 2013		CD	2564646996
