= Libertador =

Libertador (Spanish for "liberator") may refer to:

- Libertadores, the principal leaders of the Latin American wars of independence from Spain and Portugal
- Avenida del Libertador (Buenos Aires), a thoroughfare in Buenos Aires, Argentina
- Libertador Avenue, avenue in Montevideo, Uruguay
- Libertador Building, a government building in Buenos Aires, Argentina
- Puerto Libertador, Colombia
- Dajabón Province, Dominican Republic, named "Libertador" between 1938 and 1961
- Copa Libertadores, a South American football competition
- The Liberator (film), a 2013 Spanish–Venezuelan film

== See also ==
- El Libertador (disambiguation)
- Libertador Municipality (disambiguation)
