= Raid (band) =

American hardcore punk band

- Origin: Tennessee, United States
- Genres: hardcore punk; metalcore
- Years active: 1989-1993
- Labels: Hardline, Victory
- Spinoff of: One Way
- Past members: Steve Lovett; Jason VanAuken; Chad Cathy; Mark Whitlock; Steve Capehart

Raid were a Tennessee based vegan straight edge hardcore punk band that formed after the break-up of the hardcore band One Way. Raid were a part of the Hardline subculture, which combined the tenets of straight edge (a no drugs, no alcohol lifestyle) with militant veganism and environmentalism.

== History ==
Along with the Californian band Vegan Reich and the English band, Statement, Raid helped pioneer the vegan straight edge movement and the hardline lifestyle and ideology.

Their lyrics strongly expressed of their stance against drugs, alcohol, abortion, sexism and racism, and for animal liberation and radical ecology. Their output started as fairly conventional hardcore punk, which gradually evolved to incorporate elements of heavy metal and they effectively became spokesmen for the Hardline movement.

In 1989, they self-released a demo tape and this led to a seven-inch EP called Words of War a year later through Vegan Reich's own label, Hardline Records. The band split as they moved away from the straight edge lifestyle, but not before recording one last session. The recordings were released by Hardline Records as the posthumous Above The Law LP and CD in 1994. This was later re-released in 1995 by Victory Records as the Hands Off the Animals CD.

== Members ==
- Steve Lovett – vocals
- Jason VanAuken – guitars
- Chad Cathy – guitars
- Mark Whitlock – bass
- Steve Capehart – drums

== Discography ==
Albums

- Above the Law (1992)

EPs

- Demo (1989)
- Words of War (1989)
- Hands off the Animals (1995)

== See also ==
- Hardline (subculture)
- Animal rights and punk subculture
