= Planeta Eskoria =

Studio album by Ska-P
- Released: May 30, 2000
- Recorded: 2000 at studio RED LED, Madrid
- Genres: Ska punk Ska; Punk rock length = 57:19
- Label: RCA
- Producer: Tony López

Ska-P chronology
Eurosis (1998)	Planeta Eskoria (2000)	¡¡Que Corra La Voz!! (2002)

Planeta Eskoria is the fourth studio-recorded album by the Spanish ska punk band Ska-P, released on May 30, 2000.

The album cover depicts Lady Justice crucified, not on a cross, but on a dollar sign with a bar code sticking out from the North American continent. The inscription over her head reads FMI, the Spanish translation of the International Monetary Fund (IMF). The title can be loosely translated as "Planet Skum" (as in scum or dregs of society, spelled with the "k" Ska-P uses habitually).

== Track listing ==
All tracks are written by Ska-P.

No.	Title	Length
1.	"Planeta Eskoria"	4:19
2.	"Vergüenza"	3:51
3.	"Como Me Pongo"	2:45
4.	"El Auténtico"	3:40
5.	"Naval Xixón"	3:33
6.	"La Mosca Cojonera"	3:56
7.	"Eres Un@ Más"	4:16
8.	"Derecho De Admisión"	5:30
9.	"A La Mierda"	3:53
10.	"E.T.T.s"	4:07
11.	"Lucrecia"	4:28
12.	"Tío Sam"	4:21
13.	"Violencia Machista"	4:11
14.	"Mestizaje"	4:31
Total length:		57:19

== Certifications ==
Region	Certification	Certified units/sales
Spain (Promusicae)	Platinum	100,000^{^}
^{^} Shipments figures based on certification alone.

== Personnel ==
- Pulpul - Vocals and guitar
- Luismi - Drums
- Julio - Bass guitar
- Joxemi - Guitar
- Kogote - Keyboard
- Pipi - Backup vocals
