= Lágrimas y gozos =

Studio album by Ska-P
- Released: 7 October 2008
- Recorded: 2008 at Studio RED LED, Madrid
- Genres: Ska punk, ska, pop punk, two-tone
- Length: 51:56
- Label: Sony BMG
- Producer: Tony López

Ska-P chronology
Incontrolable (2004)	Lágrimas y gozos (2008)	99% (2013)

Lágrimas y gozos ("tears and joy") is the seventh studio album by the Spanish ska punk band Ska-P. It was released on 7 October 2008, entering the Spanish Top 100 Albums chart at number 6.

The first single from the CD, "Crimen sollicitationis", was released on 5 September 2008. Nicolas Sarkozy's voice is sampled in "La Colmena". The sleeve notes include lyrics to the songs and, according to the sleeve notes, the lyrics are also available in both French and English at Ska-P's official website.

== Writing and production ==
Lágrimas y gozos is the first album since Ska-P's break-up in 2002. The title of the album was a choice between Azufre ("sulphur") or Lágrimas y gozos ("tears and joy"). They explained their decision in choosing Lágrimas y gozos in an interview for the Spanish daily El Mundo:

Tears and joy is a phrase in the lyrics of Crimen sollicitationis – which is a direct attack on the Vatican for covering-up sexual abuses at a worldwide level. The phrase reflects the tears of the abused children and the joy of their abusers. However, it's a phrase that can be extrapolated to life, some [people] cry because of the joy of others.

== Track listing ==
All tracks are written by Ska-P.

No.	Title	Length
1.	"Ni Fu Ni Fa"	3:19
2.	"El Libertador"	4:34
3.	"Crimen Sollicitationis"	4:50
4.	"Fuego y Miedo"	3:42
5.	"La Colmena"	4:22
6.	"Gasta Claus"	3:21
7.	"El Imperio Caerá"	3:20
8.	"Los Hijos Bastardos de la Globalización"	4:41
9.	"Vándalo"	3:49
10.	"El Tercero de la Foto"	3:50
11.	"Decadencia"	3:39
12.	"Qué Puedo Decir"	4:06
13.	"Wild Spain"	4:23
14.	"Bonus Track: Crimen Sollicitations (Videoclip)"
Total length:		51:56

== Personnel ==
- Pulpul – vocals, guitar
- Luismi – drums
- Julio – bass
- Joxemi – guitar
- Kogote – keyboard
- Pipi – backing vocals
- Albert Pérez – trumpet
- Garikoitz Badiola – trombone, helicon
- Marc Sumo – tenor saxophone, baritone saxophone

== Release history ==
Region	Date	Label	Format	Catalog
Spain	28 October 2008	Octubre	CD	88697374512

== Charts ==
=== Album ===
Chart (2008)	Provider	Peak position	Sales	Certification
Spain Album Chart	PROMUSICAE	6		
Switzerland Album Chart	IFPI Switzerland	22		
Italy Album Chart	FIMI	30		
France Album Chart	SNEP	88		

=== Singles ===
Year	Single	Chart	Peak
2008	"Crimen sollicitationis"		
2008	"Crimen sollicitationis"	Los 40 Principales (Spain)	?
