= The Locos =

Spanish ska punk band

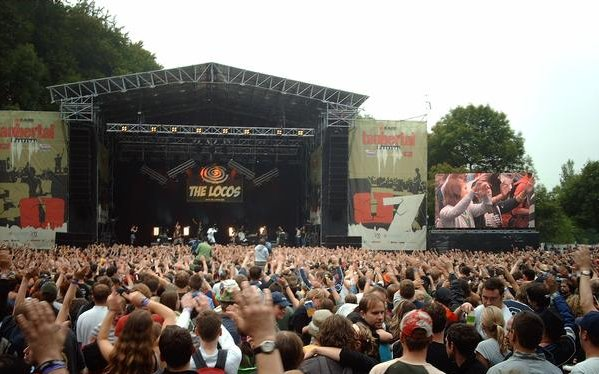
- The Locos in Taubertal Festival, Germany 2007

Background information
- Origin: Madrid, Spain
- Genres: Ska punk, ska, 2-Tone
- Years active: 2005–present
- Labels: Sony BMG, RCA, Pinhead Records
- Members: Pipi; Tommy; Niño; Ivan; Luis Fran; Fer; Zampa

The Locos are a Spanish ska punk band formed in 2005. The Locos were founded as a side project by Pipi, the backup vocalist for Spanish ska-punk group Ska-P, after the latter dissolved that same year. Although originally inclined not to rejoin Ska-P subsequent to their break-up, Pipi now divides his efforts between the two bands.

After a worldwide tour that spanned 2005 to 2007, a second Locos album was slated for release in April 2008, called Energía Inagotable.

== Members ==
- Pipi - vocals
- Niño - guitar
- Tommy - bass
- Ivan - drums
- Luis Fran - trumpet
- Fer - guitar
- Zampa - saxophones

== Discography ==
Albums

- Jaula de Grillos - 2006
- Energía Inagotable - 2008
- Tiempos Difíciles - 2012

== See also ==
- Ska-P
