= Manliftingbanner =

Dutch hardcore punk band

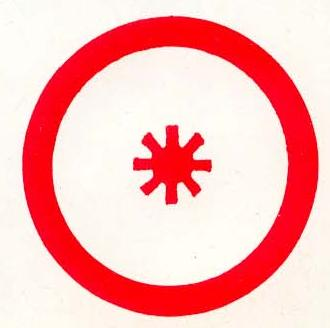
- The logo of Manliftingbanner

Background information
- Origin: Haarlem, Netherlands
- Genres: Hardcore punk Straight edge
- Years active: 1990-1993, 1998, 2008, 2012
- Labels: Crucial Response Records
- Members: Paul van der Berg; Olav van der Berg; Michiel Bakker; Bart Griffioen; Johannes Adahl
- Past members: Lord Bigma

Manliftingbanner is a Dutch, communist hardcore punk band. They are best known for their merging of the straight edge lifestyle and radical politics, particularly communism, anti-racism, gay rights, and the DIY ethic. The band has been referred to as the first communist-straight edge band. It was originally named Profound. Due to the pretentious nature of their name, it was changed to Manliftingbanner after a Communist propaganda poster.

Manliftingbanner was cited as a major influence by Swedish hardcore punk band Refused, and Born from Pain frontman Rob Franssen.

== Discography ==
All records were released on Crucial Response Records

- 1991 - Myth of Freedom
- 1992 - Ten Inches That Shook the World
- 1995 - We Will Not Rest
- 2012 - The Revolution Continues
- 2015 - Red Fury

== Band members ==
- Bart - Bass
- Paul - Guitar
- Olav - Drums
- Johannes - guitar
- Michiel - Vocals

== Former members ==
- Big - Guitar

== See also ==
- Animal rights and punk subculture
