= Sarah Kramer =

Canadian chef (1968–2025)

- Born: June 27, 1968; Regina, Saskatchewan, Canada
- Died: May 3, 2025 (aged 56); Victoria, British Columbia, Canada
- Culinary career
- Cooking style: Vegan
- Website: https://www.blog.govegan.net/

Sarah Kramer (June 27, 1968 – May 3, 2025) was a Canadian vegan cookbook author. They were the author of How It All Vegan, The Garden of Vegan, La Dolce Vegan! and Vegan A Go-Go!. In 2012, she released an app, Go Vegan! w/Sarah Kramer.

Kramer had a vegan store called Sarah's Place that opened in 2011 and closed 2 years later after a diagnosis of breast cancer. Kramer completed treatment in 2013 and afterward worked at Tattoo Zoo, which they co-owned with their spouse in Victoria, British Columbia. Kramer died on May 3, 2025, after being diagnosed with glioblastoma in late March.

== Biography ==
Sarah Kramer was born in Regina, Saskatchewan, on June 27, 1968, and raised in a vegetarian household. She wrote various vegan cookbooks over the years, and opened a vegan store in 2011, Sarah's Place in Victoria, British Columbia. Sarah co-owned the tattoo-parlor, Tattoo Zoo, with her partner, Geri Kramer.

Kramer identified as a trans non-binary person, and used she/they pronouns.

=== Cancer diagnoses and death ===
Kramer was diagnosed with breast cancer in 2012. Due to the ongoing treatment, she had to close Sarah's Place in 2013.

On March 17, 2025, Kramer was diagnosed with glioblastoma. Her partner, Geri Kramer, announced the diagnosis in a GoFundMe campaign that raised over $90,000 CAD for the couple in 24 hours. On May 3, 2025, Kramer died at the age of 56.

== Books ==
- How It All Vegan (with Tanya Barnard) (1999) ISBN 1-55152-067-2
- The Garden Of Vegan (with Tanya Barnard) (2003) ISBN 1-55152-128-8
- La Dolce Vegan (2005) ISBN 1-55152-187-3
- Vegan A Go-Go! (2008) ISBN 1-55152-240-3
- How It All Vegan: 10th Anniversary Edition (2009) ISBN 978-1-55152-253-1

== Podcast ==
- Meet The Kramers podcast

== See also ==
- Veganism
- List of vegans

== Interviews and articles ==
- Article in Shared Vision
- Podcast Interview on Vegan Freak Radio
- Interview with The Cookbook Store
- Interview with Abebooks.com
