= Watcha Clan =

Band

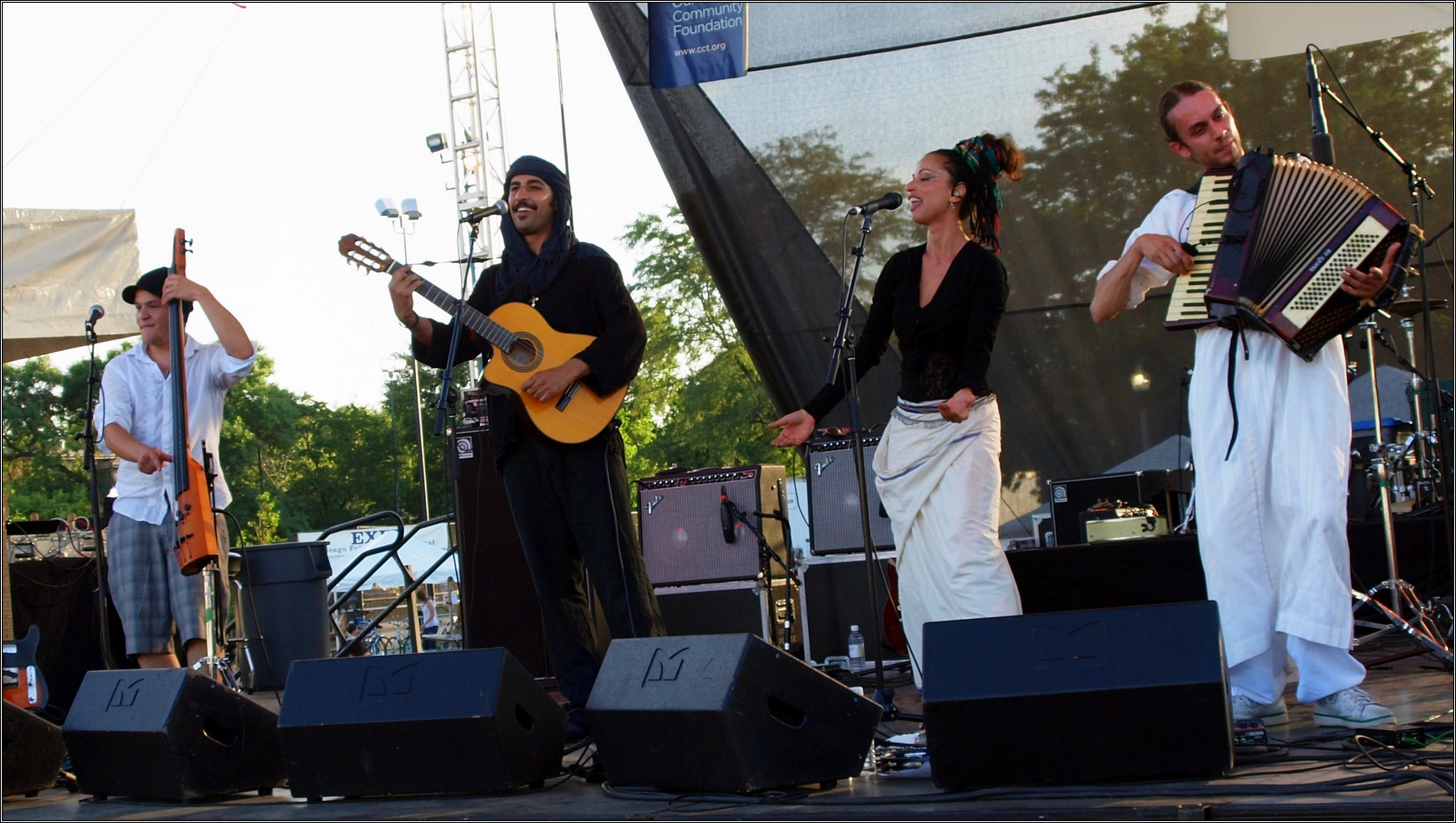
Watcha Clan Chicago-2009

Watcha Clan is a band from Marseille, France, that mixes influences of reggae, dub, electronica, and jungle.

Their lyrics include elements of Arabic, Hebrew, Spanish, Yiddish, Tamashek, French, and English.

Their album Diaspora Hi-Fi was in the Top 20 on World Music Charts Europe for three months.

== Notable performances ==
- globalFEST 2009 at Webster Hall's Studio in New York City
- 12th Annual Chicago Folk & Roots Festival 2009
- Grand Performances 2011 in Los Angeles California
- Lowlands(festival) 2013 in the Netherlands

== Members ==
- Sista K : Lead vocals, dancing
- Matt labesse : bass, double bass, guitar
- Suprem Clem : keyboards, accordion, sampling, drum machines
- Nassim Kouti : guitar, vocals, percussion

== Discography ==
- Live at Cabaret Rouge (2001, Vaï La Bott/Sous-Marin)
- Nomades A.K.A. (2002, Vaï La Bott)
- Le Bastion (2005, Vaï La Bott)
- Live Injection (2006, Vaï La Bott)
- Diaspora Hi-Fi (2008, Vaï La Bott/Piranha Musik)
- Diaspora Remixed (2009, Vaï La Bott/Piranha Musik)
- Radio Babel (2011, Vaï La Bott/Piranha Musik)
