= Paranoia e potere =

Paranoia e Potere

Studio album by Punkreas
- Released: March 1995
- Recorded: 1994–1995
- Genre: Punk rock, hardcore punk
- Length: 39:43
- Label: T.V.O.R. on vinyl
- Producer: Paolo Dal Broi

Punkreas chronology
United Rumors of Punkreas (1992)	Paranoia e Potere (1995)	Elettrodomestico (1997)

Paranoia e Potere (in English Paranoia and Power) is the first official album of the Italian band Punkreas.

Made up of thirteen new songs, Paranoia e Potere became the album which introduced Punkreas in the mainstream Italian punk scene. The album was recorded in a month in analogue. The low quality of the technology made the sound more rough and hard, making the album more hardcore.

== Track listing ==
1. "Falsi preoccupati" - 2:36
2. "I chiromanti" - 2:35
3. "Sfratto" - 2:44
4. "L'orologio" - 2:40
5. "Venduto (3x2)" - 2:59
6. "Tutti in pista" - 3:39
7. "Acà toro" - 3:20
8. "Cadena perpetua" - 2:59
9. "La canzone del bosco" - 3:13
10. "Aidid" - 2:43
11. "Anacronistico" - 3:16
12. "Marte" - 2:31
13. "La grande danza" - 3:22

== Personnel ==
- Cippa - Vocals
- Noyse - Guitar
- Flaco - Guitar
- Paletta - Bass
- Gagno - Drums
