= Sheena Wellington =

Scottish singer (born 1944)

Sheena Wellington (born 29 August 1944, in Dundee, Scotland) is a traditional Scottish singer. She is best known for performing the Robert Burns song A Man's A Man For A' That at the opening ceremony of the Scottish Parliament in 1999.

Wellington was born in Dundee on 29 August 1944. She attended Blackness Primary School and Harris Academy.

Her repertoire covers everything from Burns to ballads to contemporary songwriting, drawing from the rich Scottish tradition passed from musician to musician through the ages. She has toured in Europe, North America, Africa and the Far East and her solo albums, Kerelaw, Clearsong, Strong Women and Hamely Fare have gained international acclaim.

She is an advocate for traditional music in Scotland and has been involved in efforts to secure greater recognition, status, and funding for the country’s traditional arts. According to The Herald (Glasgow), she has been described as influential in raising the profile of her area of the arts

Honours bestowed on her for her work include Doctorates from the Universities of St Andrews (2000) and Dundee (2006)) and the Royal Scottish Academy of Music & Drama (2007), The Heritage Society of Scotland's award for her contribution to Scotland's culture, the UK-wide Association of Speakers Clubs Speaker of the Year 2001, and the Herald Archangel for her Edinburgh International Festival's series of traditional song programmes "Work, Sex and Drink".

Wellington is a Fellow of the Society of Antiquaries of Scotland, an Honorary Life Member and Patron of the Traditional Music and Song Association of Scotland (TMSA), and was, for several years, vice-president of the Voluntary Arts Network and patron of Voluntary Arts Scotland.

In 2004, she joined Scotland's Cultural Commission and quickly became a leading member, as well as an outspoken critic of plans to amalgamate the Scottish Arts Council and Scottish Screen into a super-quango called "Culture Scotland", which eventually happened with the creation of Creative Scotland.

Wellington was made the year's Honorary President of Greenock Burns Club (The Mother Club) in January 2006, when she became the first woman in the club's 204-year history to be invited to give The Immortal Memory.

In November 2009, she was installed in the Scottish Traditional Music Hall of Fame.

She was, from 2006 to 2016, the Honorary Librarian of Dundee's Wighton Collection and still organises the programme of concerts, recitals and classes in the Wighton Heritage Centre to promote the music and song it contains.

She also performed at the memorial of Alex Salmond on 30 November 2024, at St Giles' Cathedral, Edinburgh, a rendition of A Man's a Man for A' That.

In 2026, Wellington won the Janet Paisley Lifetime Achievement Award from the Scots Language Awards.
