= Animal Defense League =

International animal rights organisation

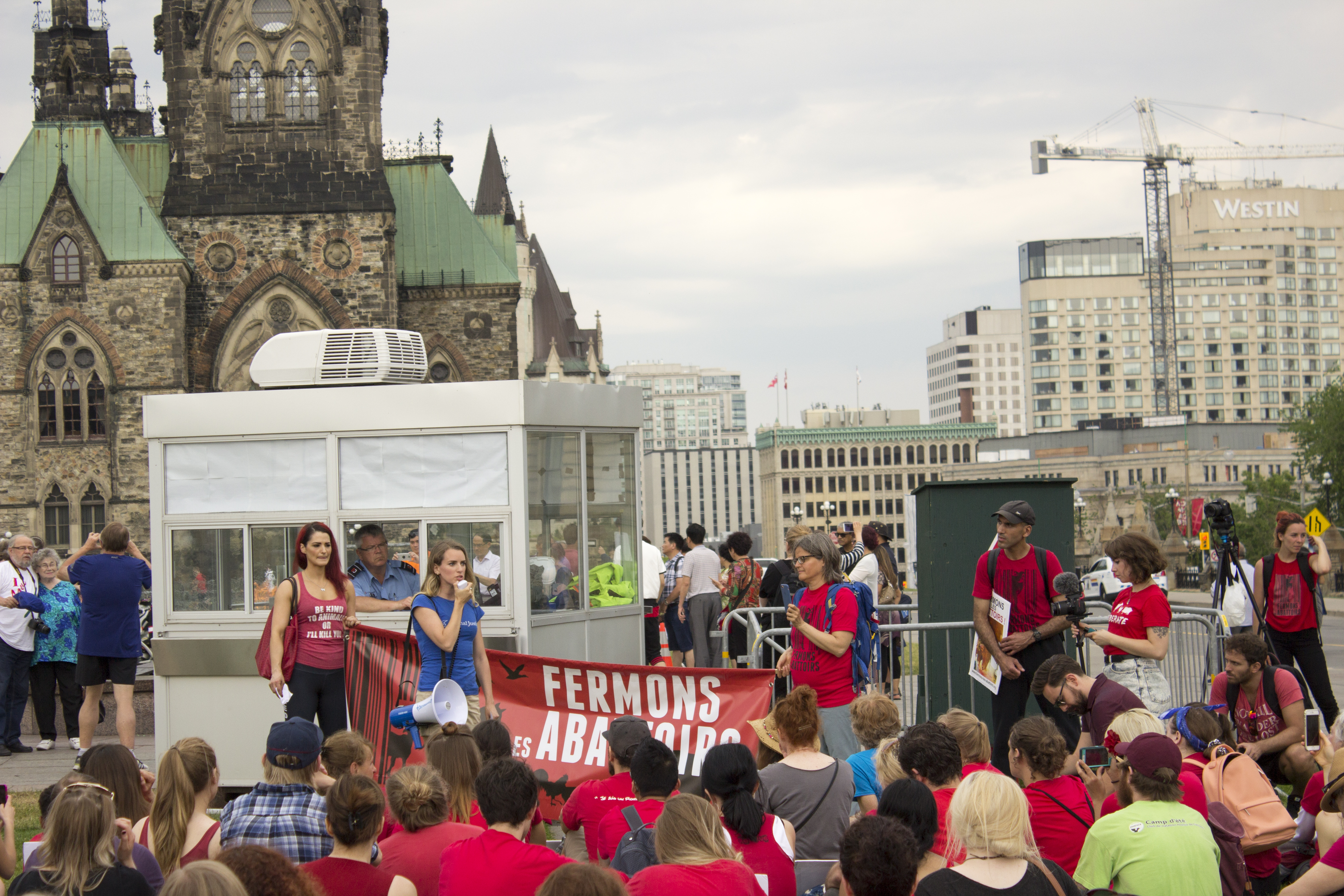
Animal Defense League protesters listen to speakers at Parliament Hill, Canada.

The Animal Defense League (ADL) is an internationally active grassroots animal rights organization, fighting to end animal exploitation and abuse. Working under the same banner, the coalition of activists and supporters that make up the various ADL chapters are able to have a stronger effect in their campaigns and fight together toward the collective goal of animal liberation.

== Known chapters ==
United States

- Chicago
- Boston
- Long Island
- Salt Lake City
- Los Angeles
- Evansville, Indiana
- Portland, Oregon
- Washington, D.C.
- New Jersey
- Philadelphia
- North Carolina
- Arizona

Canada

- Ottawa
- Vancouver

== See also ==
- List of animal rights groups
