= Ska-P =

Spanish ska punk band

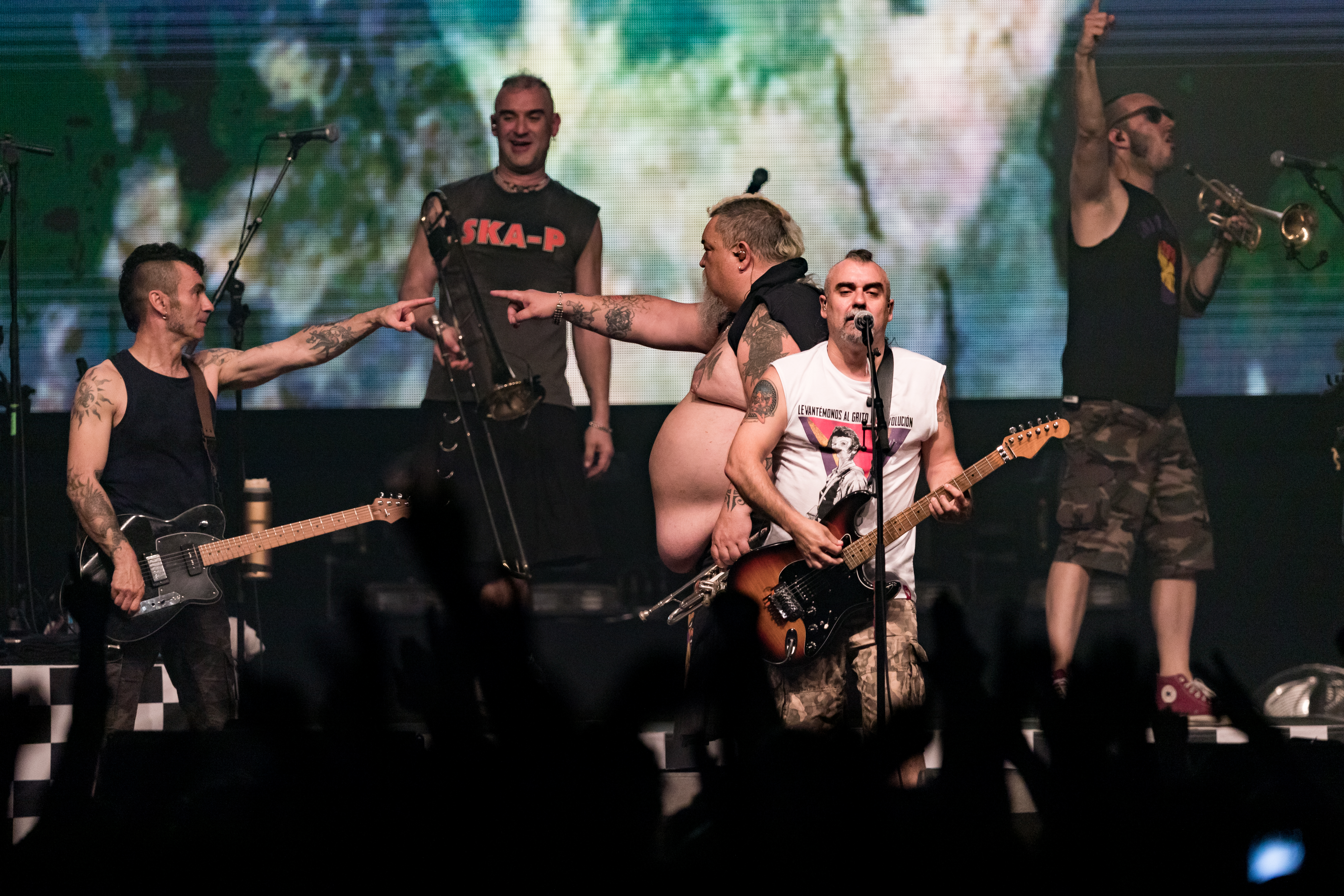
- Ska-P performing in 2019

Background information
- Origin: Vallecas, Madrid, Spain
- Genres: Ska punk, two-tone, punk rock, alternative rock
- Years active: 1994–2005, 2008–2014, 2017–present
- Labels: AZ, RCA, Sony BMG, Warner
- Members: Pulpul; Joxemi; Julitros; Kogote
- Past members: Pipi; Luismi
- Website: ska-p.com

Logo Of Ska-P

Ska-P (Spanish pronunciation: [esˈkape]) is a Spanish ska punk band formed in 1994 in Vallecas, a district of Madrid, by a group of friends from Madrid, Navarre and Euskadi.

The band can be categorized, politically, as an anti-establishment musical group, sometimes even considered anarcho-communist. Musically, despite their fun image, Ska-P has well-rehearsed and tight arrangements and, as of 2002, includes among its members a brass section.

At the end of 2004, they announced work on a new album. After voting four against two, in February 2005, the sudden and unexpected announcement was made that the band would take a break to allow the members to work on side projects, though some considered the band to have dissolved. Their farewell concert in September 2005 filled the 10,000-seat La Cubierta in Spain. The band's worldwide farewell tour of 2005 ended in Buenos Aires, Argentina, in October of that year.

In October 2007 the band confirmed they were getting back together and in September 2008 released the single "Crimen sollicitationis". This was followed in October by a new album, Lágrimas y gozos ("tears and joy"). The release of the album was followed by a brief tour. Ska-P returned to La Cubierta Stadium in December 2008 to perform their only concert in Spain of that tour. In 2010 and 2011, Ska-P held their first tour in Japan.

== Band name ==
The band name is a pun on the Spanish word for "escape" and ska p(unk). The name further takes advantage of the letter k common to ska and, since the early 1980s, also closely associated with the Madrid working-class district of Vallecas, as a symbol of working-class pride. Thus, Vallekas and many other occurrences of the k instead of the c or qu in Spanish words, reflecting also a feature of the Basque, which has neither the qu nor the c, replacing both with k.

== History ==
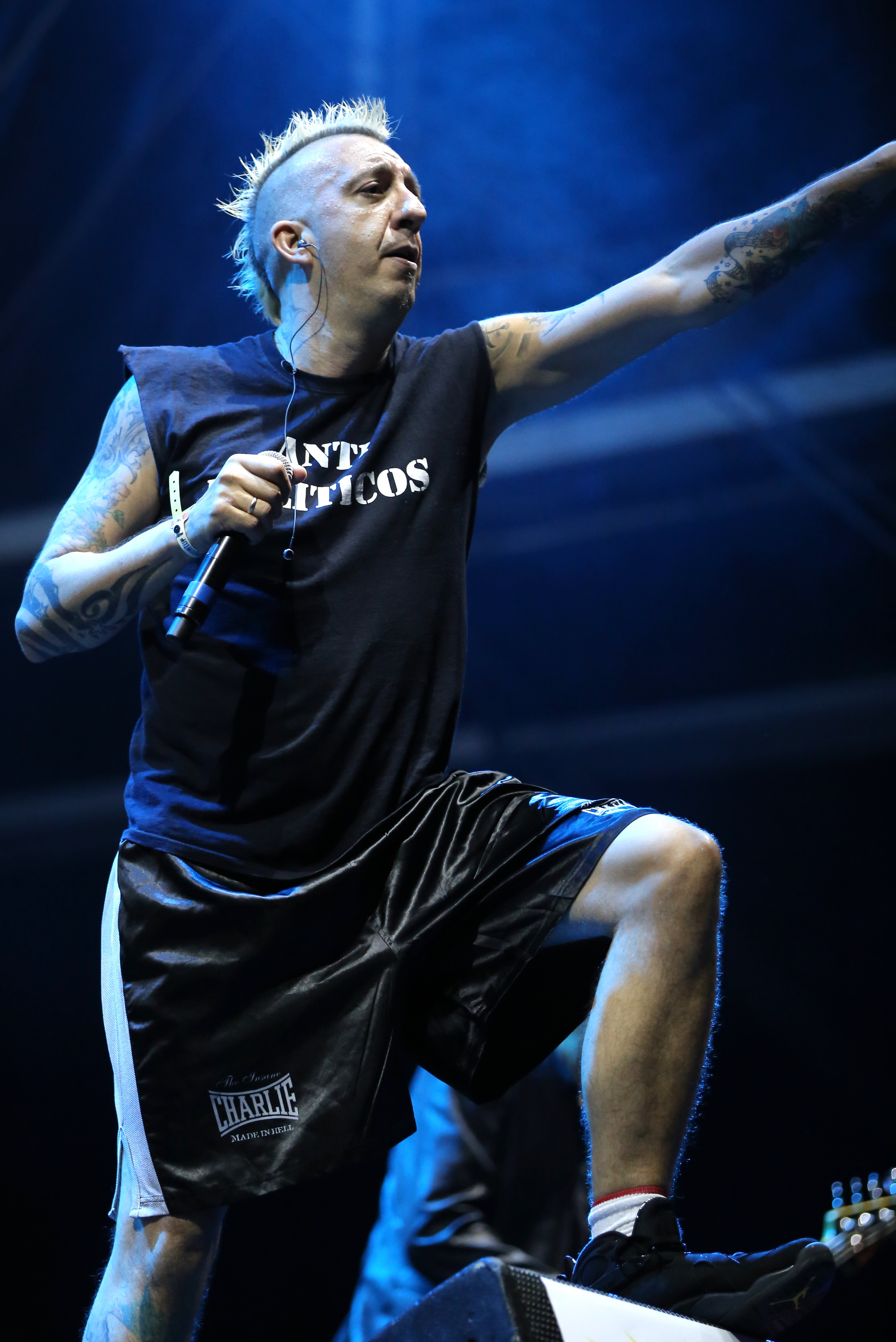
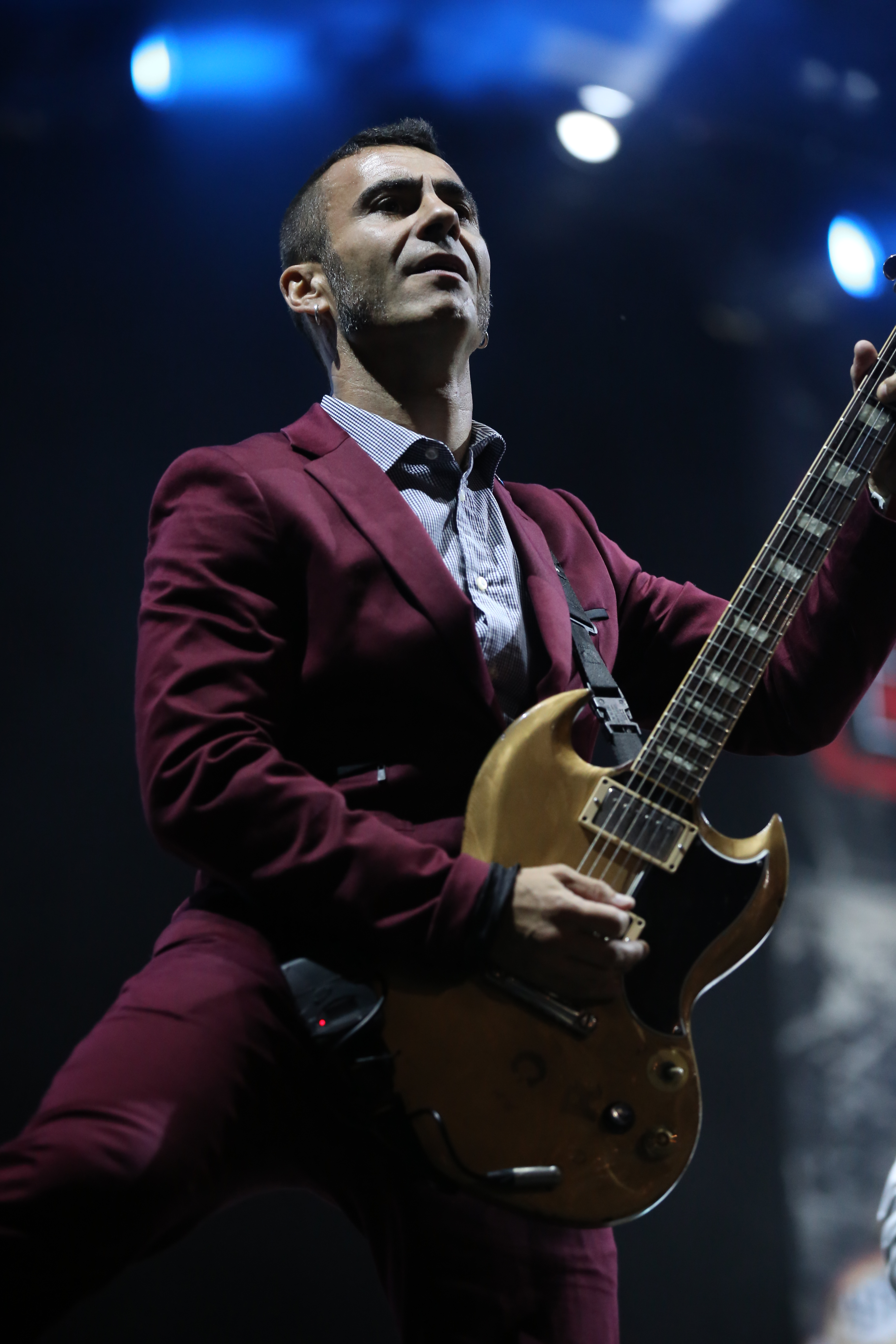
"Pipi" (left) and "Joxemi" performing in 2013

=== 1994: Beginning ===
Ska-P was formed by a group of friends in Vallecas, Madrid in 1994 as a ska band. The initial lineup was Pulpul (lead vocals and guitar), Toni Escobar (guitar and vocals), Julio (bass), Kogote (keyboard and vocals) and Pako (drums). That same year, they recorded their first CD, the nine-track Ska-P, with AZ Records. It did not sell many copies compared with later efforts, but it gave the group recognition, especially for the song "Como un rayo", a song for the football team Rayo Vallecano, which became fairly popular in Vallecas. They played various concerts as support bands for Extremoduro and Platero y tu despite still having a small following.

=== 1995–1996: Rise to fame ===
Guitarist Toni left the band in 1995 (due to the impossibility of combining his work with the band's schedule), and Joxemi took his place. Pipi, a friend of Pulpul, also joined the band. Previously, he had only entered onstage in costume in some concerts and had helped the group set up. From this point, he took the role of secondary vocalist while continuing to appear in costume during some songs.

In 1996, the group released their second album, El vals del obrero, on RCA Records, selling many records and becoming well known for the song "Cannabis". They took part in the ninth Vallekas Rock Festival, an event which increased their reputation.

=== 1997–1999: Eurosis and the first world tour ===
After a tour of Spain and part of France, in 1997, they recorded their third album, Eurosis, again with RCA Records. They performed in Spain and France and also made their debut in Latin America, playing in Argentina and Mexico. Pako, drummer and founding member of Ska-P, left the band in the middle of the tour and was replaced by Luismi. The band also participated in Arezzo Wave, an Italian music festival.

=== 2000–2002: Planeta Eskoria and ¡¡Que corra la voz!! ===
In 2000, they recorded Planeta Eskoria. Considered by some to be their best work, it helped to consolidate their sound and included songs with a more serious tone, although the album also included festive songs in the vein of previous discs and the lyrical content was no different from before. During this high point, they toured France, Italy, Switzerland and Spain. They were considered an international band.

Two years later, their fifth album, ¡¡Que Corra La Voz!!, which Ska-P members have called their "most complete", was released. It featured a mix of styles, with as many festive ska songs as more serious songs in the vein of Planeta Eskoria. The list of countries Ska-P toured included Hungary, Belgium, Netherlands, Austria and the other European countries previously mentioned. They also returned to Latin America, playing in Argentina, Chile, Costa Rica and Mexico. Furthermore, in these last tours, trumpet player Txikitín and trombonist Gari, both from the Spanish city of Bilbao, joined the band.

=== 2003–2004: Incontrolable tour ===
In 2004, Incontrolable, the last album before their "indefinite hiatus", was released. Besides having 16 songs, it included a DVD with 13 songs recorded in Switzerland and France. Video clips and images of the last tour were also included.

=== 2005–2007: Indefinite hiatus ===
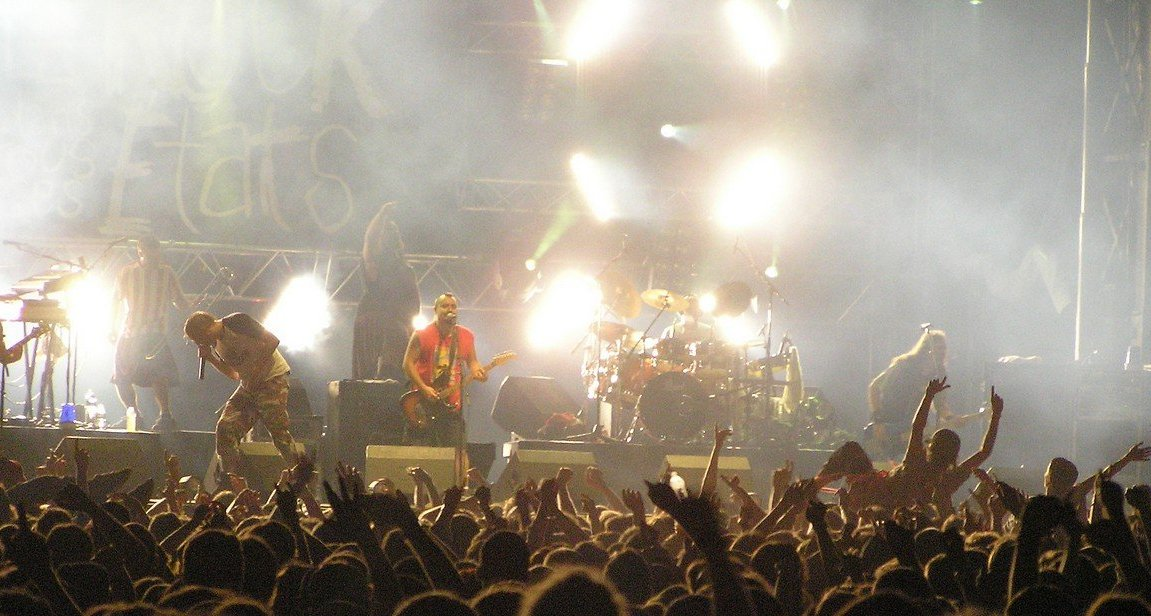
Ska-P in 2005

After more than 12 years together, in February 2005, the band announced that they were going on an indefinite hiatus. They explained that they "needed a rest", although Pipi claimed that the decision was made by Pulpul alone, and the rest of the group had to quit as they could not continue without him. In fact, there are rumors, based on the attitude of both sides, that there were internal squabbles between Joxemi, Pipi and Pulpul. Even so, the group declared that "the possibility of a future return remains open". They also announced a farewell tour.

Their last concert in Spain was 24 September 2005 in La Cubierta de Leganés and their last show was in Argentina was on 12 October 2005. The group's members decided to end their farewell tour there thanks to the treatment they had received there previously. All the revenue from this festival was donated to Argentine charities such as the mapuche communities (in memory of the pain inflicted on them by the Spanish during the conquest and formation of the Viceroyalty of Río de la Plata) and almshouses serving food in Buenos Aires.

In 2006, six months after the hiatus begun, Pulpul wrote an entry on the official band website announcing that he was still composing and hoped that the lyrics would be included on a new Ska-P album. Some members of the group joined other groups during the hiatus, with Pipi, for example, founding a group similar to Ska-P called The Locos. Joxemi formed a group with a more punk style called No-Relax in 2006.

=== 2007–2014: End of first hiatus, second hiatus and new albums ===
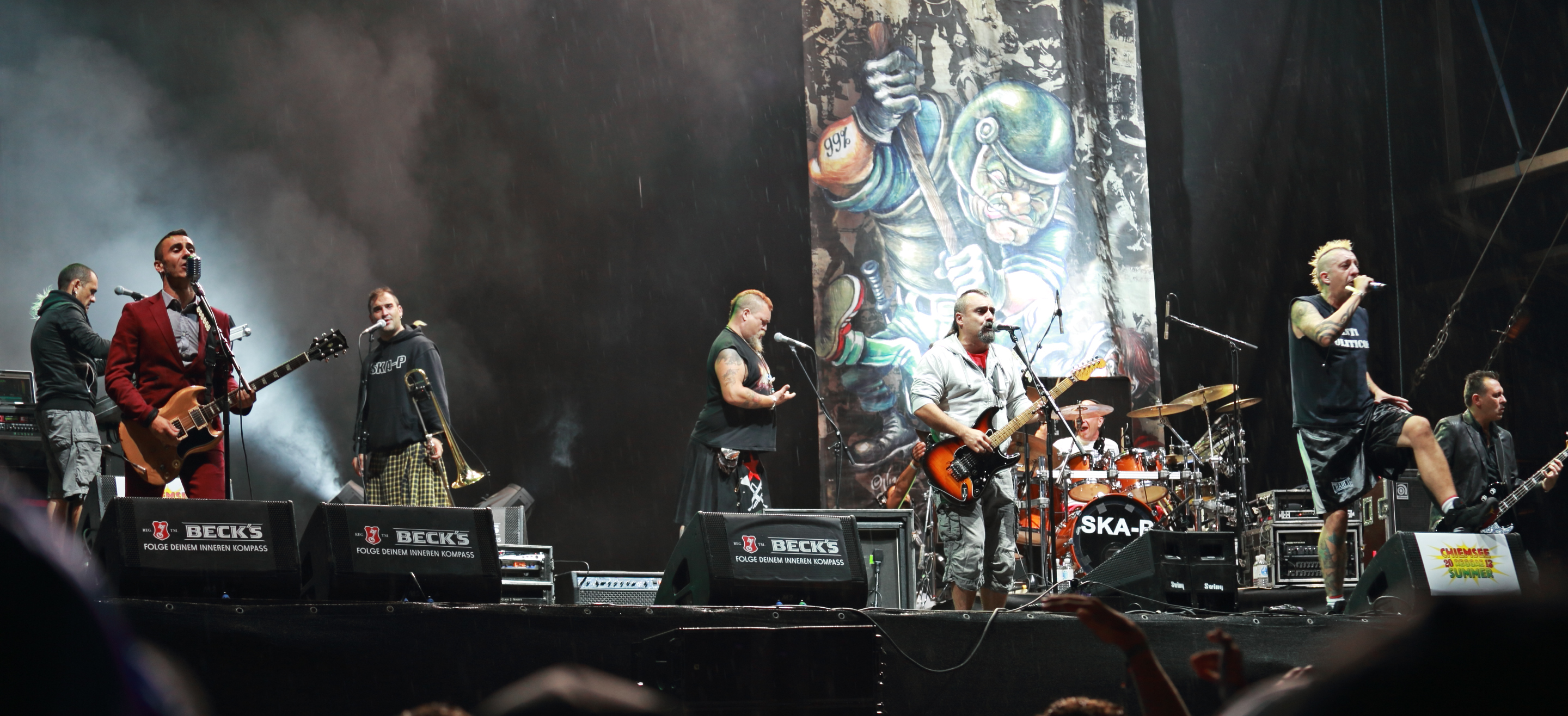
Ska-P in 2013

On 12 October 2007, two years after the "indefinite hiatus" began, a message from Pulpul appeared on the official Ska-P website referring to a possible Ska-P reunion in 2008. In the same message, the members of the group wrote positively of the reunion, except for Pipi, who initially said he would continue playing with his new group The Locos and would not return to Ska-P. In the details of the message, they said they would try to get together all the old members and possibly release an album in October 2008. In 2007, Alacrán Producciones opened a contract for a 2008 Ska-P tour. The group's return was confirmed on the official page and a new album for October 2008, Lágrimas y gozos, was announced, as well as a mini-tour of Europe in Italy, France, and Spain, and of Latin America in Mexico, Chile, Ecuador, Argentina and Venezuela.

The album Lágrimas y gozos was released 7 October 2008, with the album 99% following on 5 March 2013. In 2014, the group once again announced an indefinite hiatus.

On 5 October 2018, they released another album, Game Over.

== Members ==
Current members

- Roberto "Pulpul" Gañán – lead vocals, rhythm guitar (since 1994)
- José "Joxemi" Redin – lead guitar, backing vocals (since 1995)
- Julio Sánchez – bass, backing vocals (since 1994)
- Alberto "Kogote" Javier – keyboards, backing vocals (since 1994)
- Garikoitz "Gari" Badiola – trombone, helicon
- Alberto "Txikitin" Iriondo – trumpet
- Iván Guevo – drums (since 2018)

Former members

- Luis "Luismi" García – drums, percussion (1999–2021)
- Ricardo "Pipi" Delgado – vocals (1995–2017)
- Francisco "Pako" Javier Navío – drums, percussion (1994–1999)
- Toni Escobar – lead guitar, backing vocals (1994–1996)
- Milo "EsMiloBur" Martínez – drums

== Other projects ==
- The Locos: "Pipi", "Gari"
- No-Relax: "Joxemi", "Micky", "David"

== Discography ==
=== Studio albums ===
Year	Album	Peak positions		
Year	Album	ESP	FRA	SUI
1994	Ska-P	–	–	–
1996	El vals del obrero	–	–	–
1998	Eurosis	–	–	–
2000	Planeta Eskoria	–	30	–
2002	¡¡Que corra la voz!!	–	21	84
2008	Lágrimas y gozos	6	88	22
2013	99 %	3	73	37
2018	Game over	–	–	–
2023	Seguimos	–	–	–

=== Live ===
Year	Album	Peak positions			Notes
Year	Album	ESP	FRA	SUI	Notes
1999	Seguimos en pie	–	–	–	VHS/DVD
2000	En concierto	–	55	55	CD
2004	Incontrolable	–	50	41	CD + DVD
2016	Live in Woodstock Festival	–	–	–	CD + DVD

=== Compilation albums ===
Year	Album	Peak positions			Notes
Year	Album	ESP	FRA	SUI	Notes
2013	Todo Ska-p	16	–	–	CD/DVD

=== Singles ===
- 1996: "Cannabis" from (El vals del obrero)
- 1996: "Ñapa es" from (El vals del obrero)
- 1998: "Paramilitar" from (Eurosis)
- 2000: "Planeta eskoria" from (Planeta eskoria)
- 2000: "Derecho de admisión" from (Planeta eskoria)
- 2008: "Crimen sollicitationis" from (Lágrimas y gozos)
- 2013: "Canto a la rebelión" from (99 %)
- 2013: "Se acabó" from (99 %)
- 2018: "Jaque al Rey" from (Game over)

=== Tribute albums ===
- "Señor Matanza" – (a track on Mano Negra Illegal, 2001 tribute album to Mano Negra)
- "Navegando" – (a track on Agradecidos... Rosendo, 1997 tribute album to Rosendo)

== Videography ==
- Ska-p en concierto (1998) (VHS)
- Seguimos en pie (1999) (VHS, DVD)
- Incontrolables (2003) (DVD with audio CD)
- Los mejores (2009)
- Live in Woodstock Festival (2016) (DVD with audio CD)

== See also ==
- Animal rights and punk subculture
- Mustard Plug, an American ska band similar to Ska-P
