= Verdurada =

Verdurada is a quarterly cultural and political event held in São Paulo, Brazil, established in 1996. It consists in the presentation of bands, usually hardcore punk, and talks about political and social matters. Besides that, other activities have been organized, such as debates and video and art exhibitions with political and diverging content.

During the events the consumption of alcohol, cigarettes and drugs is not allowed, and they are not sold inside the venue. In the end of the event, a vegan dinner is distributed.

The event is totally organized by Coletivo Verdurada, a collective formed by people from the hardcore/punk/straight edge scene.

The objectives of the organization of Verdurada are basically two: "to show that it's possible to organize events successfully with no sponsorship from big companies and no paid promotion in media, and to take to the audience the music made by the contesting youth and opinions by contesting thinkers and activists".
