= Forever True (1991–2001) =

Compilation album by Earth Crisis
- Released: November 13, 2001
- Label: Victory

Earth Crisis chronology
Last of the Sane (2001)	Forever True (1991–2001) (2001)	To the Death (2009)

Forever True (1991–2001) is a compilation album by the American hardcore punk/metalcore band Earth Crisis. Tracks 1 through 5 are from the album Slither, 6 through 9 from the album Gomorrah's Season Ends, 10 through 14 from the album Destroy the Machines, tracks 15 and 16 from the Firestorm (EP), and 17 and 18 from All Out War (EP). It includes a live cover of "Sunshine of Your Love", originally by Cream.

Professional ratings
Review scores
Source	Rating
AllMusic	4/5 stars

== Track listing ==
1. "Killing Brain Cells" – 3:14
2. "Behind the Wire" – 2:34
3. "Biomachines" – 3:34
4. "Slither" – 4:00
5. "Nemesis" – 5:02
6. "Broken Foundation" – 4:00
7. "Situation Degenerates" – 2:39
8. "Cease to Exist" – 3:54
9. "Gomorrah's Season Ends" – 3:26
10. "New Ethic" – 2:53
11. "Destroy the Machines" – 3:12
12. "The Wrath of Sanity" – 3:52
13. "Deliverance" – 3:11
14. "Born from Pain" – 3:16
15. "Firestorm" – 3:51
16. "Forged in the Flames" – 2:45
17. "Ecocide" – 2:53
18. "All Out War" – 2:42
19. "Sunshine of Your Love (Live)" – 3:41
20. "Smash or Be Smashed (Live)" – 2:37
21. "Forced March (Live)" – 6:34
