= List of Victory Records artists =

Victory Records is an American record label based in Chicago. Originally focusing on hardcore punk and post-hardcore bands, Victory later expanded its roster to include emo and pop rock acts.

== Current bands ==
- Abandoned by Bears
- Awaken I Am
- Carousel Kings
- Colours
- Cro-Mags
- Conveyer
- Dead Girls Academy
- Erimha
- For the Win
- Like Torches
- The Reverend Horton Heat
- Save The Lost Boys
- Seeker
- Shattered Sun
- The Tossers
- (R)Hopes & Dreams
- Victorian Halls
- We Ride
- We Were Sharks

== Former bands ==
- 1997
- A18
- Across Five Aprils
- Action Action
- Aiden
- All Out War
- Amber Pacific
- American Standards
- Arise and Ruin
- As They Burn
- Atreyu
- The Audition
- The Autumn Offering
- A Stained Glass Romance
- Baby Gopal
- Backfire
- Bad Brains
- Bayside
- Before There Was Rosalyn
- Beneath the Sky
- Between the Buried and Me
- Billingsgate
- Blackguard
- The Black Maria
- Blood for Blood
- Bloodlet
- Boysetsfire
- Broadside
- The Bunny The Bear
- Buried Alive
- Burning Heads
- Bury Your Dead
- By the Grace of God
- Carnifex
- Cast Iron Hike
- Catch Twenty-two
- Cause for Alarm
- Chase Long Beach
- Close Your Eyes
- Cockney Rejects
- Comeback Kid
- Continents
- Corpus Christi
- Count the Stars
- Counterparts
- Damnation A.D.
- Darkness Divided
- Darkest Hour
- A Day to Remember
- Dead to Fall
- Deadguy
- Delamour
- Design the Skyline
- Despised Virtue
- Destrophy
- Doughnuts
- Dr. Acula
- Earth Crisis
- Electric Frankenstein
- Emmure
- Endwell
- Fall City Fall
- Farewell to Freeway
- Feed Her to the Sharks
- The Forecast
- ForeverAtLast
- Freya
- Funeral for a Friend (Distribution Only)
- Fury of Five
- Giles
- Glasseater
- God Forbid
- Grade
- Gravemaker
- Grey Area
- Guilt
- Hatebreed
- Hawthorne Heights
- A Hero A Fake
- Hi-Fi and the Roadburners
- Hoods
- House of Lords
- The Hurt Process
- Iceburn
- In Cold Blood
- Inner Strength
- Insight
- Integrity
- Ill Niño
- Islander
- Jamie's Elsewhere
- Jud Jud
- June
- The Junior Varsity
- Josh DeShano
- Jungle Rot
- Killing Time
- Kissing Candice
- L.E.S. Stitches
- LENR
- Lockweld
- Madball
- Madcap
- Martyr A.D.
- Meridian
- Minus
- Moros Eros
- Neurotic November
- Nights Like These
- No Innocent Victim
- Nodes of Ranvier
- On the Last Day
- One Life Crew
- OS101 (aka Old School 101)
- Otep
- Out of Order
- Pathology
- A Perfect Murder
- Premonitions of War
- Proud to Be Dead
- Raid
- Reach the Sky
- Refused
- The Reunion Show
- Right Direction
- Ringworm
- River City Rebels
- The Royalty
- Run Devil Run
- Scars of Tomorrow
- The Scenic
- Secret Lives of the Freemasons
- Shelter
- Shutdown
- Silverstein
- Sinai Beach
- Sister Sin
- Skarhead
- The Sleeping
- Smoking Popes
- Snapcase
- Snowdogs
- Somehow Hollow
- Snow White's Poison Bite
- Spitalfield
- Stigmata
- Straight Faced
- Straylight Run
- Streetlight Manifesto
- Strife
- The Strike
- Student Rick
- Taking Back Sunday
- Taproot
- Tear Out The Heart
- Ten Foot Pole
- Terror
- These Hearts
- Thieves and Villains
- Thumb
- Thursday
- Triumph
- Voodoo Glow Skulls
- The Warriors
- Warzone
- Waterdown
- William Control
- With Blood Comes Cleansing
- With Honor
- Within the Ruins
- Worlds Collide
- Wretched
