= Firestorm (EP) =

EP by Earth Crisis
- Released: 1993
- Recorded: June 14–16, 1993
- Studio: Mars Recording Studio in Cleveland, Ohio
- Genre: Metalcore, hardcore punk
- Length: 15:16
- Label: Victory
- Producer: Earth Crisis, Bill Korecky

Earth Crisis chronology
All Out War (1992)	Firestorm (1993)	Destroy the Machines (1995)

Professional ratings
Review scores
Source	Rating
AllMusic	2.5/5 stars

Firestorm is the second EP by American metallic hardcore band Earth Crisis. It was released in 1993 and marked the band's first release through Victory Records. Firestorm has been described as a landmark release in hardcore punk for its metal influences and political, militant lyrics, along with helping "pioneer what would become both a signature sound for the band, as well as metalcore as a whole – right alongside the likes of Integrity." The title track is considered Earth Crisis' best-known song.

== Background and recording ==
After recording Earth Crisis' debut EP, All Out War (1992), drummer Mike Riccardi was unable to commit himself to touring and was replaced by Dennis Merrick. In 1993, the band recorded a demo of Firestorm and sent it to several labels, some of which praised it but were afraid of a possible backlash due to its lyrics. After Victory Records head Tony Brummel had dismissed it, there were plans to release it on the newly formed Incision Records but following a very successful show at More Than Music Fest in Dayton, Ohio, Brummel changed his mind and approached Earth Crisis for a multiple-record contract. Vocalist Karl Buechner had, by the time of the deal, been two years in college with the intention of becoming a history teacher, but ultimately left it to focus on his music career. Likewise, guitarists Scott Crouse and Benjamin Read, who were around fifteen years old, dropped out of high school at the time for the same reason.

In the summer of 1993, at the beginning of the national All Out War tour, Earth Crisis recorded Firestorm with music engineer Bill Korecky in his Mars Studios (Cleveland, Ohio). Bassist Ian Edwards could not travel because he was attending his senior year in high school. The band recruited a temporary bassist with the requirement that he has to be vegan straight edge, but after realizing that the player was not as good as they expected, Crouse and Read recorded the instrument. Buechner affirms that the band had better chemistry than on their previous EP, which was made when they were only around five months together. During the recording of Firestorm, Crouse said that Buechner "lost" his voice.

Some songs from the Firestorm demo have been re-released: "The Order That Shall Be" ended up on the 1995's benefit compilation album Stones to Mark a Fire for an Animal Liberation Front prisoner; "Forced To Kill" and "Behind the Mask" on the 2009 vinyl Forced to Kill (Seventh Dagger Records); and "Behind the Mask" and "Time of Strife" on the 2015 EP The Discipline (Bullet Tooth Records).

== Music and lyrics ==
Firestorm is characterized by palm muted, staccato guitar riffs without solos, screaming vocals and militant, political lyrics. Although their previous EP already exhibited metallic influences, these were considerably more prominent on Firestorm and the production improved. This metallic hardcore sound would be the basis for their next albums which further developed it.

"Firestorm", the first track, starts with E open chords and "a focused, unrelenting tone" which anticipates the arrangements of "extended mosh parts" during the EP. Its lyrics call for a purging of drug gangs and cartels as well as corrupt politicians and law enforcement in a neighborhood submerged in drug addiction and crime, declaring "violence against violence". Other authors state that its militancy is also directed at animal abusers. Vocalist Karl Buechner said that he composed it following the drug-fueled crimes and violence that escalated through the first half of the 1990s in northern Syracuse, where his nephew, girlfriend and previously himself had lived. He put the song in line with books by the original Black Panther Party, such as Seize the Time or Will You Die with Me?, and in further interviews revealed that "Firestorm" was also inspired by Scott Cody, a Black Panther from South Los Angeles who ended up in jail after fighting drug dealers.

"Forged in the Flames" (which is connected to "Firestorm" on the same track) concerns personal and spiritual strength achieved through straight edge. "Unseen Holocaust" addresses the colonization and genocide of indigenous cultures by European Christian conquerors, a topic that "horrifies" the band. The last track, "Eden's Demise", describes an ecological collapse caused by humanity, anthropomorphizing the Earth as being tortured and stating that veganism is the solution. Throughout the EP, Earth Crisis likens drug dealers and powerful people who damage the ecosystem to "demons". Live High Five described the screamed lyrics as "idealistic, passionate, and incredibly pissed off".

== Reception and impact ==
The song "Firestorm" drew controversy for its extremist lyrics. As stated by Greg Bennick, "Maximum Rocknroll and other people on the scene got upset. [...] Was Earth Crisis saying they were going to round up drug dealers, block by block? You would imagine them walking down the streets in jackboots [which are often associated with totalitarianism]. But in no way is that what they were suggesting. To me, they were on the path of righteousness and compassion, and that appealed to me." Some people criticized its simple structure as well; according to guitarist Scott Crouse they "alluded to us not being able to play or write anything with substance," which "subconscious[ly]" led the band to write more complex music on the next album. By the same token, others acclaimed its straightforwardness, including MetalSucks who regarded it as "a Mondrian/Rothko-like masterpiece of restraint" and Brian Cook stating that its "mosh-tastic songwriting" was "genius". The track has since been called a straight edge anthem and become Earth Crisis' best-known song.

Several authors describe Firestorm as a landmark release in hardcore punk for its introduction of metal elements and militant eco-political lyrics, which in turn inspired numerous bands. In 2000, it was chosen as one of the "Best Hardcore Punk Singles of the 90s" by Maximumrocknroll, with columnist Max Ward proclaiming: "I think that record changed everything in hardcore. Good recording, confrontational." According to MetalSucks, the title song "defined 90s hardcore" and has one of the best breakdowns of all time. Reba Meyers of Code Orange called Firestorm the record that changed her life. The ring name of late professional wrestler Adam Firestorm was based on the song.

"Firestorm" has been covered by Refused, and Maroon. Maroon quotes it in their animal liberation song "24HourHate" of 2006.

Other bands parodied the over-the-top militance of "Firestorm", including the songs "Firestorm, My Ass" by Propagandhi (which compares it to Kristallnacht), "In Defense of All Life" by Good Clean Fun and "Get the Kid with the Sideburns" by Reversal of Man. In retrospective interviews, Propagandhi vocalist Chris Hannah expressed admiration for the uncompromising animal liberation message of Earth Crisis and the vegan straight edge scene.

== Track listing ==
All lyrics are written by Karl Buechner.

No.	Title	Length
1.	"Firestorm"/"Forged in the Flames" (latter starts at 3:52 into the track)	6:38
2.	"Unseen Holocaust"	4:56
3.	"Eden's Demise"	3:42

== Personnel ==
Earth Crisis

- Karl Buechner - vocals
- Benjamin Read - guitar
- Scott Crouse - guitar
- Dennis Merrick - drums

Production

- Earth Crisis - production
- Bill Korecky - engineering, production
