= The Lives of Famous Men =

- Origin: Portland, Oregon
- Genres: Indie, jazz, pop
- Years active: 2006–present
- Members: Daniel Hall; Ari Katcher; Dylan Mandel; Andrew Totemoff; Jason Wahto

The Lives of Famous Men is an American rock band that formed in fall 2006 in Portland, Oregon. Each member of the band hails from Anchorage, Alaska and the band takes its name from the title of a poem by Jack Gilbert.

== History ==
The band began rehearsing together in the fall of 2006. In spring 2007, they recorded an EP entitled Rehearsal in Hillsboro, Oregon, and after playing a few shows in Portland, started their first national tour supporting Youinseries and National Product. At the end of the summer, they returned to their hometown of Anchorage, Alaska to play three shows with Shiny Toy Guns. That fall, during a three-week stop in the middle of another cross-country outing, they recorded their second EP Modern Love, The Wooden Vehicle with producer James Paul Wisner (Dashboard Confessional, Paramore) in St. Cloud, FL.

The Lives of Famous Men began their 2008 touring with five dates at the SXSW Music Festival in Austin, TX, playing shows with The Working Title, Danger Radio, The Summer Set, and Anarbor. Shortly after, they toured the Western states with Lakes and the South and Midwest with Chase Pagan. In May, they played the Philadelphia date of the MTVu Campus Invasion Festival, opening for Wyclef Jean, Cobra Starship, All Time Low, and The Spill Canvas. At the beginning of the summer, they again returned to Alaska for two shows with Motion City Soundtrack and an annual festival featuring Poison The Well and MXPX Called Summer Meltdown. During the remainder of the summer, they toured the west and Midwest with A Thorn For Every Heart and on There Came a Tour with Ivoryline, There For Tomorrow, and In:aviate. In the fall, they joined the first leg of a national tour with A Cursive Memory, A Rocket to the Moon, Brighten, and The Urgency.

The Lives of Famous Men have also played shows with Dear and the Headlights, National Product, Vedera, Every Avenue, The Maine, Weatherbox, Jet Lag Gemini, One Small Step For Landmines, Self Against City, We Shot the Moon, Thieves and Villains, A Change of Pace, Houston Calls, The Hush Sound, Portugal, and School Boy Humor.

In September 2009, the group were featured on Jimmy Kimmel Live!, after winning a contest, where they performed the song "You're Everyone I Know Right Now".Their appearance received a mention in the November 2009 issue of Spin Magazine. In December 2009, the band released the song Sunshine as a digital single. The song, which had already become a popular staple in their live set, was recorded in Seattle, WA with producer Casey Bates (Forgive Durden, Portugal. The Man).

== Members ==
- Daniel Hall – vocals
- Ari Katcher – guitar
- Dylan Mandel – drums, percussion
- Andrew Totemoff – bass
- Jason Wahto – keys, programming

== Discography ==
=== Albums/EPs ===
Release Date	Album/EP
May 8, 2007	Rehearsal (EP)
December 18, 2007	Modern Love, The Wooden Vehicle (EP)
December 22, 2008	Sunshine (Single)
December 15, 2009	Sunshine (EP) (4 Tracks)
October 5, 2010	Marigold Maxixe
