= Pains (EP) =

Pains.

EP by Islander
- Released: October 1, 2013
- Genre: Nu metal
- Label: Victory

Islander chronology
Side Effects of Youth (2012)	Pains. (2013)	Violence & Destruction (2014)

Professional ratings
Review scores
Source	Rating
Tuned Up	4/5 stars
HM Magazine	3.5/5 stars
The Front Row Report	9/10 stars
KNAC	3.4/5 stars

Pains. is the second EP by American rock band Islander. The EP features H.R. of Bad Brains. The EP has been compared with P.O.D.'s Murdered Love and Korn's debut album.

== Critical reception ==
Nathaniel Lay writes: "Pains. is edgy, destructive, and somehow smooth despite its ripping instrumental work and cracking vocals. When all is said and done, the EP serves as a great label debut that will easily make listeners want to keep an eye out for Islander’s forthcoming LP." Graham Finney reports "At the moment, the four tracks dished up are enough to give fans a taster of what this band are about and, while it's not the most original piece of work you're ever likely to hear, if you're a fan of Rage Against the Machine, Deftones, or Bad Brains, then you'll get value for your money should you choose to shell out on this EP. For me though, while it's nice to hear Islander paying homage to their influences on Pains, it'll be nice to hear them experiment a bit more with their own ideas and really open up their wings for future releases." Chelc Eaves stated "Among these tracks lies a song featuring H.R. (Human Rights), lead singer of the hardcore punk band Bad Brains, and it’s a solid pairing. With the release of their new EP, Islander also made time to shoot a video for their song “New Colors," which they shot, directed and edited in its entirety. These days, it's refreshing to see a band come out with hard work and drive, go the distance to do everything for themselves and end up with a great formula and booming music." Reggie Edwards writes "If people do that to Islander, we may lose a band who has great potential, so listen up. Their debut EP, Pains., opens with "New Colors," a track that's reminiscent of P.O.D. meets Rage Against the Machine or Deftones with a little Norma Jean or The Chariot sprinkled in for fun. Take that and add the next track, "Lucky Rabbit," which features H.R. of Bad Brains and you've got one extreme song that will blow your mind coming from a new band. With the final two tracks, "Glass" and "Big Shot," you've got an EP that will make you wish it was a full-length. This band has all the makings of being one of the next big things and in a music world where touring is the new way to make your living, Islander has what it takes. Look for them to not go anywhere anytime soon. In fact, if you see them on some big tours in the near future (Warped Tour), don't be surprised." "The last song on this EP is "Big Shot", which really is a vehicle to highlight the musical ability of this band. To quote Sonny Sandoval of P.O.D.: "New school band with old school soul and passion". This is like opening a fresh cold soda on a really hot day, refreshing. I look forward to seeing a lot more of these guys in the future." states David Kemp.

== Track listing ==
No.	Title	Length
1.	"New Colors"	3:38
2.	"Lucky Rabbit" (Feat. H.R. of Bad Brains)	4:36
3.	"Glass"	4:09
4.	"Big Shot"	4:14

== Credits ==
Islander

- Mikey Carvajal – vocals
- Chris Doot – bass
- Andrew Murphy – guitar
- Eric Frazier – drums

Additional Musicians

- H.R. (Bad Brains) – vocals on track 2
