= Karl Buechner =

American singer

- Born: December 23, 1970 (age 55); Syracuse, New York, U.S.
- Genres: New York hardcore; hardcore punk; extreme metal
- Occupation: Singer
- Years active: 1988-present

Karl Buechner (born December 23, 1970) is an American musician from Syracuse, New York, best known as the frontman for the hardcore band Earth Crisis. He is also the singer of Freya, Path of Resistance, Vehement Serenade, Apocalypse Tribe and 1000 Drops of Venom.

In the mid- to late 1990s, Buechner attained a great popularity within the hardcore music scene as the frontman of Earth Crisis due to their outspoken advocacy for the straight edge and vegan lifestyles. He has been featured and interviewed by CNN, CBS, The New York Times and Fox News, and addressed the United States Congress about teens and substance abuse.

== Early life ==
Buechner was born on December 23, 1970 in Syracuse, New York. He has German and Irish roots. In his early teens, Buechner got into punk rock through his cousin and skateboarding, becoming a fan of bands such as the Dead Kennedys and Subhumans, as well as having traveled to other cities to participate in skate competitions. Around the age of fifteen, he saw the Cro-Mags' video "We Gotta Know" that "was the spark that set off" his love for hardcore punk music and, years later, he would describe The Age of Quarrel as "still the greatest hardcore album of all time". During that time, Syracuse was going through a lingering recession where crime and illegal drug trade began to proliferate. Many of Buechner' skater friends started using drugs and alcohol, one of whom died while others were progressively affected, which motivated him to become straight edge. His and other Earth Crisis members' families also suffered from tragedies and random acts of violence at the time, including robberies. According to Buechner: "to an extent we were kind of the products of [those] experience[s], but we didn't join with it, we rebelled against it."

Most of Buechner's family is vegetarian. He became a pescetarian at the age of sixteen after his sister handed him a PETA magazine with photographs of caged animals in a slaughterhouse. At eighteen, he transitioned into vegetarianism and shortly afterwards veganism, getting into animal liberation issues through conversations with his grandmother. The first vocalist of Earth Crisis, DJ Rose, states that he and Buechner traveled to Albany where they met Dave Stein and Steve Reddy, who also taught them about animal rights before they established the group in 1989. Subsequently, Buechner became a volunteer at the Syracuse Wildlife Rehabilitation Center where he witnessed animals that were doused with gasoline and tortured in different ways, leaving "quite an impression on" him and which he attributes to the anger expressed in their early records.

Buechner graduated from Henninger High School in 1989. He attended college to become a history teacher with the intention of supporting a career in music or sports, but left it after two years when Earth Crisis was signed by Victory Records.

== Career ==
Karl Buechner started playing bass and formed his first band, Mainforce Patrol, at the age of sixteen. In 1989, he became a member of Earth Crisis but their initial lineup was short-lived. He kept the idea of the group alive and continued writing songs, restarting them in 1991 as the new vocalist and releasing five further albums. In 1995, their drummer Dennis Merrick was seriously injured and, as he recuperated, the rest of the group formed the hardcore-oriented band Path of Resistance, releasing their album Who Dares Wins in 1996. Earth Crisis disbanded in 2001 and reformed in 2007, releasing three more albums so far.

In early 2001, he began singing for Freya (formatively titled Nemesis and End Begins after EC songs) with two members of Earth Crisis plus two other members. They were named for the Norse goddess of fertility and their lyrics took inspiration from history, mythology and more personal issues, without addressing veganism or straight edge directly because not all members follow the lifestyles. They have released five studio albums so far. Their 2010 album, 'All Hail the End', featured cover art by Brendon Flynn, and guest vocals on "Condemned" by J.Costa of Thy Will Be Done.

In late 2005, Buechner joined Canadian band A Perfect Murder for a tour, replacing vocalist Kevin Randel.

Since 2008, he is the frontman of the supergroup Vehement Serenade along with Mike Couls (Cro-Mags, Skarhead, Cold as Life), Jamin Hunt (Sworn Enemy), Eddie Ortiz (Subzero) and Pauly Antignani (Sworn Enemy). In 2013, they released their debut album The Things That Tear You Apart.

In 2016, he formed the metalcore band 1000 Drops of Venom. Since 2017, he is also the frontman of Apocalypse Tribe and they released a split album with Rob Aston's Death March on August 25.

== Influence ==
Karl Buechner has been cited as an influence by artists such as Jamey Jasta of Hatebreed, Greg Bennick of Trial and Sean Ingram of Coalesce.

== Discography ==
Earth Crisis

- Destroy the Machines (1995)
- Gomorrah's Season Ends (1996)
- Breed the Killers (1998)
- Slither (2000)
- Last of the Sane (2001)
- To the Death (2009)
- Neutralize the Threat (2011)
- Salvation of Innocents (2014)

Path of Resistance

- Who Dares Wins (1996)
- Can't Stop the Truth (2006)

Freya

- As the Last Light Drains (2003)
- Lift the Curse (2007)
- All Hail the End (2010)
- Paragon of the End (2013)
- Grim (2016)

Vehement Serenade

- The Things That Tear You Apart (2013)

=== Guest appearances ===
Year	Song	Artist	Album	Source
2004	"No Truce"	A Perfect Murder	Unbroken	
2004	"Still Here"	Agnostic Front	Another Voice	
2007	"Addiction"	Damnation A.D.	In This Life or the Next	
2010	"Pedestals"	Such Gold	Pedestals	
2011	"The Only Life I Know"	Lionheart	Built on Struggle	
2019	"Believer of the Truth"	Nueva Ética	La Conquista	
