= Salvation of Innocents =

Studio album by Earth Crisis
- Released: March 18, 2014
- Genre: Metalcore
- Length: 34:45
- Label: Candlelight
- Producer: Chris "Zeuss" Harris

Earth Crisis chronology
Neutralize the Threat (2011)	Salvation of Innocents (2014)

Salvation of Innocents is the eighth album by the American metalcore band Earth Crisis, released in March 2014 by Candlelight Records. It is their first concept album about animal rights and anti-vivisection. Vocalist Karl Buechner divided the theme into three parts throughout the album: the feelings of the protestors, the viewpoint of the vivisectionists, and what the animals are experiencing. A comic book of the Liberator series published by Black Mask Studios was made in collaboration with the band and released simultaneously with Salvation of Innocents, sharing similar conceptual ideas and artwork.

On July 10, 2020, Salvation of Innocents was reissued on vinyl as a limited edition.

== Critical reception ==
Salvation of Innocents received positive reviews from music critics. Sam Mendez of Ultimate Guitar wrote that while musically the album did not stand out from the band's previous records, the decision to create a concept album lyrically focused on one social issue made it worthwhile for animal rights activists as well as old and new listeners of Earth Crisis.

== Track listing ==
No.	Title	Length
1.	"De-Desensitize"	3:15
2.	"Out of the Cages"	2:30
3.	"Shiver"	3:41
4.	"The Morbid Glare"	2:11
5.	"Razors Through Flesh"	2:40
6.	"Depraved Indifference"	2:44
7.	"No Reason"	2:39
8.	"The Pallid Surgeon"	2:38
9.	"Devoted to Death"	3:11
10.	"Into Nothingness"	2:47
11.	"Tentacles of the Altering Eye"	2:35
12.	"Final Breath"	4:04

== Credits ==
Personnel

- Karl Buechner – vocals
- Scott Crouse – guitar
- Ian "Bulldog" Edwards – bass
- Dennis Merrick – drums
- Erick Edwards – guitar

Technical personnel

- Chris "Zeuss" Harris – mixing
