= Earth Crisis =

American metalcore band

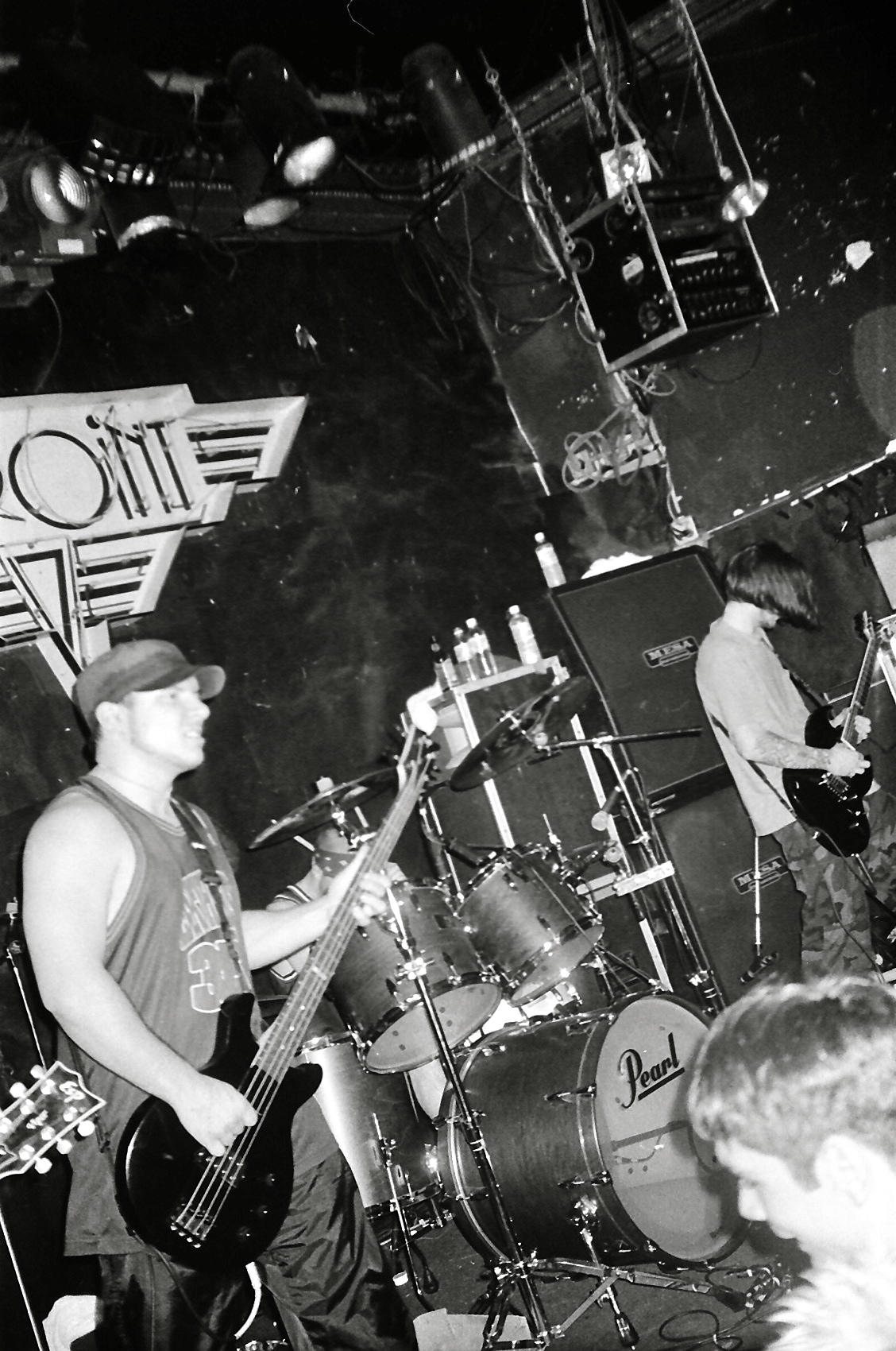
- Earth Crisis at The Point in Little Five Points, Atlanta (1998)

Background information
- Origin: Syracuse, New York, U.S.
- Genres: Metalcore; hardcore punk
- Years active: 1989, 1991–2001, 2007–present
- Labels: Roadrunner; Victory; Century; Candlelight
- Spinoffs: Path of Resistance, Freya, Vehement Serenade, Apocalypse Tribe, Framework, Isolated, Sect, Tooth and Claw
- Members: Karl Buechner; Scott Crouse; Ian Edwards; Dennis Merrick; Erick Edwards
- Past members: Kris Wiechmann; Ben Read; Michael Riccardi; Jesse Buckley; John Moseman; DJ Rose

Earth Crisis is an American metalcore band from Syracuse, New York, active from 1989 until 2001, reuniting in 2007. Since 1993, the band's longest-tenured members include vocalist Karl Buechner, lead guitarist Scott Crouse, bassist Ian Edwards, and drummer Dennis Merrick. Their third and current rhythm guitarist Erick Edwards joined the band in 1998.

The band has released eight full-length studio albums and four studio EPs, among other releases. The band is known for supporting animal rights, promoting a straight edge and vegan lifestyle, and addressing further social and political issues. Earth Crisis is considered a crucial developer and influence for both the metalcore genre and vegan straight edge movement. Tom Connick of NME conferred the title of "the ultimate in vegan-straight edge hardcore" on Earth Crisis.

== History ==
=== Initial career (1989–1995) ===
The band originally formed in 1989, after bassist Karl Buechner proposed the idea to his friend DJ Rose, whom he knew because both skateboarded together. Rose became the vocalist and they were joined by Jesse Buckley on drums and John Moseman on guitar. Established in the latter part of the youth crew heyday, where many groups disbanded and their members stopped being straight edge, they wanted to "keep that torch burning", as Buechner said. "The feeling of disappointment we had in those bands lead us to promote straight edge as being a lifetime commitment to never touch a drop of poison. We wanted people to know they can believe in us." Rose named the band after the 1984 album of the same name from the British reggae band Steel Pulse, because its cover portrayed many of the things they "would stand against", such as the starving African children, the two blocs of the Cold War and Klansmen.

Its initial lineup was short-lived; they had two or three practices and played a show in Utica, New York. After that performance, Rose decided to quit the group to spend more time booking shows. Buechner continued composing and formed a new lineup of the band in 1991, after attending a skateboard demonstration where he met members of the vegan straight edge band Framework. He switched to lead vocals in the process and was joined by four of the five members of Framework: guitarist Scott Crouse, bassist Ian "Bulldog" Edwards, guitarist Ben Read and drummer Michael Riccardi, all of who participated in Earth Crisis as a side project. Both Earth Crisis and Framework appeared on the 1992 various artists tape compilation Structure Hardcore Compilation, released by the members of Chokehold. Earth Crisis' four-song EP All Out War marked their debut release later in 1992, and shortly afterwards the band became a first priority.

In the summer of 1993, at the start of the All Out War tour, Earth Crisis recorded the Firestorm EP in the studio of Bill Korecky in Cleveland and released it through Victory Records. For this album, Riccardi was replaced by Dennis Merrick. Later on, Ben Read was replaced by Kris Wiechmann.

Destroy the Machines, their first full-length record, was released in 1995 and would eventually become the best-selling album in the history of Victory Records. Later this year, the band's touring van was involved in an accident that injured all band members, most severely Merrick. During his recovery time, the other band members began the group Path of Resistance with Riccardi, Rose and another friend to remain occupied.

=== Subsequent years and breakup: (1996–2001) ===
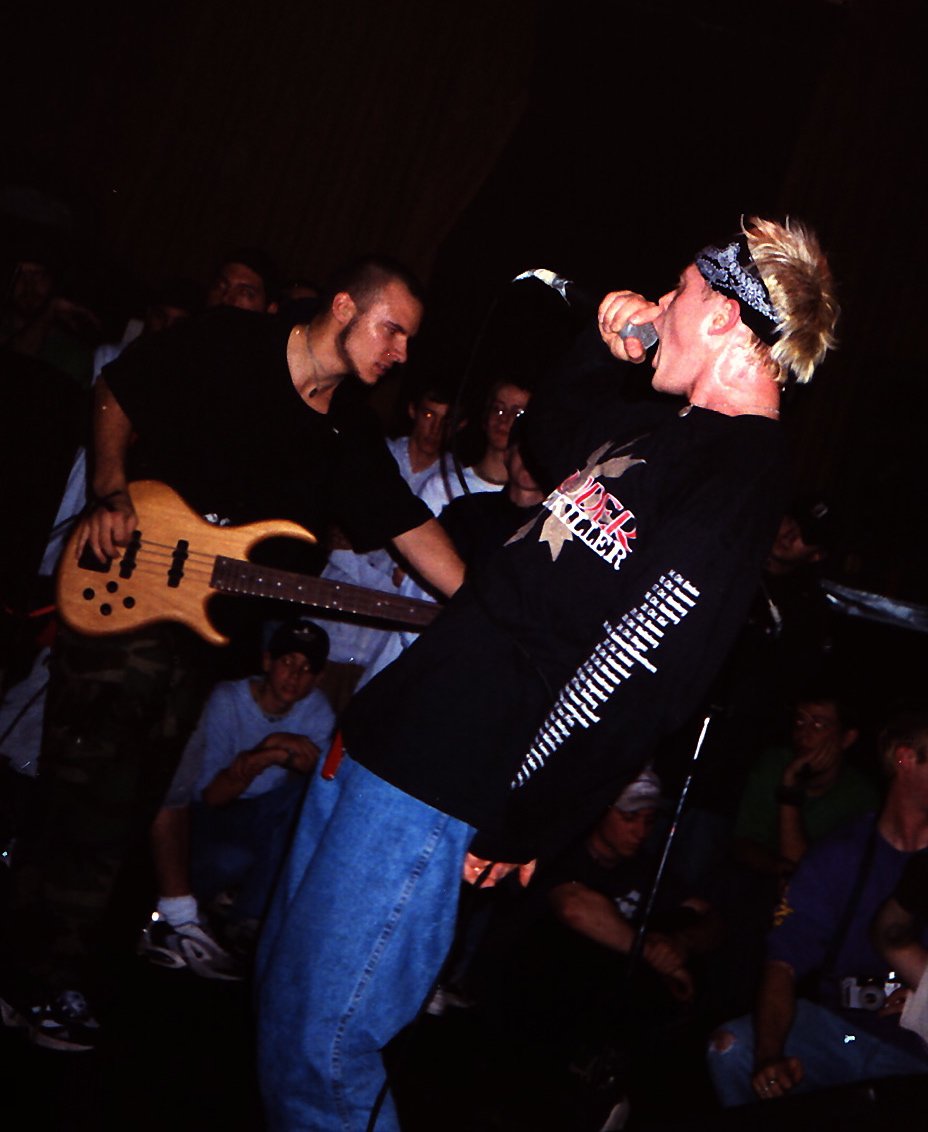
Earth Crisis performing in 1996

1996's Gomorrah's Season Ends brought a more complex and developed form of metalcore and, shortly thereafter, they were asked to take part in the inaugural Ozzfest, including one song for its live album. Their popularity grew, resulting in a deal with Roadrunner Records, and the band released Breed the Killers in 1998, the first with guitarist Erick Edwards (bassist Ian Edwards's brother) replacing Wiechmann. The album was produced by Andy Sneap and featured a guest appearance by Machine Head vocalist and guitarist Robb Flynn.

The band later returned to Victory Records, releasing 2000's Slither soon after. With more emphasis on production and a change of style steered towards nu metal, it drew mixed reactions from critics and fans but had a wider exposure in mainstream music. Their final album before their breakup was 2001's Last of the Sane, which included cover versions of songs by The Rolling Stones, Slayer, Led Zeppelin, Cream and Dead Kennedys.

In 2001, Earth Crisis disbanded on good terms because some members could no longer engage in a full-time touring band due to their personal lives. They played the final show of their initial career at Hellfest in Syracuse, New York. After the band's breakup in 2001, Buechner, Bulldog and Erick Edwards went on to form Freya, a band named for the Norse goddess of fertility. Meanwhile, Crouse and Dennis Merrick moved to California and formed the group Isolated.

=== Reformation (2007–2009) ===
On January 27, 2007, the reunited Earth Crisis played the Maryland Metal and Hardcore Festival. Although it was originally planned as a one-off concert, numerous American and European dates followed thereafter. Earth Crisis headlined the Firestorm Fest in early 2008, in the midst of a US tour.

On September 10, 2008 it was announced that they had signed a worldwide deal with Century Media. They entered the studio on October 16, 2008 to record a new record, and Tue Madsen was hired to mix the project. The finished album, To the Death, was released in Europe on April 20, 2009 and in North America on May 5, 2009.

In August and September 2009, Earth Crisis played America and Europe on the Hell on Earth Tour, alongside Sworn Enemy, Neaera, Waking the Cadaver, War of Ages, Thy Will Be Done and War from a Harlots Mouth.

=== Latest releases: (2010–present) ===
In March 2010, they announced that drummer Andy Hurley of Fall Out Boy and formerly Racetraitor would serve as a touring musician for a portion of the band's upcoming tour, as Merrick would only be available for certain dates.

In July 2011, Earth Crisis released their seventh studio album, Neutralize the Threat. The album was mixed and mastered by Zeuss. The tracks "Raise" and "Total War" were released online as an album teaser.

Earth Crisis released their eighth studio album Salvation of Innocents on March 4, 2014. A comic book of the Liberator series published by Black Mask Studios was made in collaboration with the band and released simultaneously with the album, sharing similar conceptual ideas and artwork.

== Musical style and influences ==
Although ideologically tied to the straight edge movement, the initial musical influences of Earth Crisis were mainly from New York hardcore bands such as Agnostic Front, Cro-Mags and Sick of It All. After the All Out War EP, they developed an increasingly technical and heavier style, citing death metal bands Napalm Death, Bolt Thrower and Obituary as prime inspirations. Buechner's vocals became rougher with each release as well, culminating in the completely gutturally screamed Gomorrah's Season Ends. Terrorizer magazine referred to this album as "heavy hardcore taken to a new level, all the blackness that was hinted at on Firestorm realized in all its formidable glory." In this period, many of their songs were built on Merrick's drum beats.

When asked what ten bands inspired Earth Crisis over the years in a 2016 interview, guitarist Scott Crouse named DYS, Judge, Corrosion of Conformity, Agnostic Front, Slayer, Sepultura, Metallica, Conviction, Zero Tolerance and Iron Maiden.

Their third studio album, Breed the Killers, maintained the previous aggressiveness and its growled vocals were "taken about as far as possible", but it followed a structure more akin to the "post-Judge hardcore of the Path of Resistance record Who Dares Wins", according to Shawn Macomber of Decibel. Dennis Merrick said: "On Breed the Killers I think we achieved the most honest representation of our sound without sounding too raw or too slick". Its follow-up, Slither, had a change of style that steered towards nu metal. Buechner declared that, rather than being influenced by other styles, they "resurrected" the sound of All Out War in a proper way, which also had melodic choruses and spoken word verses.

Their first post-reunion album, To the Death, was described by Buechner as "a mixture between Destroying the Machines and Breed the Killers." According to Stereo Killer, it was "arguably the band's heaviest offering" but with "more traditional verse/chorus/verse" material. Neutralize the Threat followed a similar path, but "with a Gomorrah's Season Ends vibe thrown in", the band stated. Scott Crouse said that he always tried "to get the perfect blend of heaviness, imagery and listenability" and that these two albums were the first to "hit that mark". Salvation of Innocents included, in addition, some clean vocals that were compared by one reviewer to the sludge metal band Crowbar, as well as "some elements of melodic metalcore" and faster songs.

Earth Crisis is often tied with hardcore punk and the metalcore sub-genre. Crouse has denied this association stating, "[w]e get credited often for creating 'metalcore,' but I’m not sure that’s fair. We were not very influenced by hardcore at all. We were drawing influence from bands like Corrosion of Conformity’s Blind album. Believer, Carcass and Slayer. (...) It was really just us injecting those more metal elements into a scene that wasn’t very familiar with them, so I think it seemed like we created something." In an interview with Metal Assault, however, Crouse maintained that the band was still influenced by hardcore, though "we tend to lean more towards the metal side than the hardcore side, specially (sic) in the later years. (...) I think we fit in more with a band like Carcass than we do with bands like Youth of Today or Gorilla Biscuits or something."

== Lyrics, views and activism ==
When our band started, lyrically, we put a focus on documenting the history that corporate news and media chose to ignore. When the Animal Liberation Front, Earth First or the Sea Shepherds save lives, we let people know through our music. Animals enduring violent, useless tests in laboratories, whales being killed with explosive harpoons, elephants, rhinos, and tigers slaughtered to near extinction are all sickening wastes of life.

— Karl Buechner, 2015

The name of the band, Earth Crisis, indicates how their members see the current state of the planet and in their lyrics they seek to offer solutions to it; these are either "educational" or encourage direct-action. Most of them focus on rejection of recreational drugs, animal products, animal testing, industrial livestock production, illegal drug trade and an impending earth's doom caused by wars or an ecological collapse. On the other hand, they promote straight edge, veganism, self-empowerment and organizations such as Earth First!, Sea Shepherd Conservation Society and the Animal Liberation Front. In the words of the academic Jonathan Pieslak, some of their lyrics "read like passages" taken from "direct-action essays" of these institutions. Other subjects include criticism against white supremacy and, especially on Breed the Killers, oppressive governments. 2000's record Slither incorporated more topical issues, such as genetic engineering and second amendment rights. Their seventh and eighth albums, Neutralize the Threat and Salvation of Innocents, are concept albums entirely dedicated to real-life vigilantes and animal rights/anti-vivisection, respectively. The albums All Out War, Gomorrah's Season Ends and Breed the Killers included essays that delve into their lyrics and beliefs. According to the sociologist Ross Haenfler, Earth Crisis combined "youth crew's outspoken commitment to straight edge with Manliftingbanner's direct politics".

In a 1998 interview with Roadrunner Records, Karl Buechner described Earth Crisis' philosophy: "I want to boil it down to one notion: personal accountability. Respect for yourself, respect for the lives of innocent beings around us." He added that "Just being drug-free doesn't make you a good person, you need to use that clarity of the mind to become actively involved in the struggle that is being waged for earth, human and animal liberation." Their message disjoined from the "posicore" attitudes in its advocation for violent direct action. However, they believe that it must be used only as a last resort: "destruction and violence are the last thing I want to see but tragically, they are sometimes necessary. We place so far greater value on the lives of the innocent beings than any type of worth that could be put upon someone who's sadistic or greedy and doesn't want to change their profit system", said Buechner.

The band cited authors Peter Singer, John Robbins and Huey P. Newton as inspirations. In their live shows, there is usually literature about PETA, Greenpeace and others distributed. They have been longtime supporters for organizations such as the Animal Defense League, having done several benefit concerts for them. Nevertheless, they are not part of any of these groups or a political party: "We're about things we're interested in and we sing about things that happen politically, but we're not left-core or right wing. We don't want to get tangled up in someone else's agenda, which can happen if you join up in certain organizations."

Earth Crisis was occasionally misidentified with the hardline subculture, but they are not against homosexuality and believe that abortion should remain as an option in some instances. They also do not have a religious agenda and think that that is mainly a personal choice.

== Legacy ==
Earth Crisis had a huge impact on both the hardcore punk music and its ideals. MetalSucks said: "For anybody who was not in the hardcore scene back then, it is hard to describe the impact they had or how controversial they were. You either loved them or hated them for bringing both metal and veganism into the hardcore scene". Sociologist Ross Haenfler stated in The Vinyl Factory that "Earth Crisis became the face of straight edge throughout the 1990s" through "the convergence of 'radical' animal rights activism, a more aggressive 'metalcore' sound, and hardcore crews", becoming "one of the most controversial bands in the scene's history."

Their albums Firestorm, Destroy the Machines and Gomorrah's Season Ends were particularly influential for the emerging metalcore genre. According to Andrew O'Neill, "Earth Crisis inspired a much more heavy metal sound in hardcore" and "the distinction between the two [genres] started to crumble" shortly after those records were released.

To a large extent, Earth Crisis was responsible for the rising of vegan straight edge militancy in the mid- to late 90s, when veganism was rarely present in mainstream culture. Haenfler said that, while "earlier straight edge bands advocated vegetarianism – for example Youth of Today, Insted and Manliftingbanner", Earth Crisis "made animal rights (and environmentalism) central to the scene" as a "self-described 'vegan straight edge' band", "inspiring thousands of kids to give up animal products entirely." They also spawned many activists in the scene because their message "imparted the sense of urgency in a way that nothing else that ever come before had", according to Peter Daniel Young.

Some of their songs went on to be considered by some as anthems, such as "Firestorm" for straight edge and "Ultramilitance" for eco-terrorists. They also drew major media attention, having been featured and interviewed by CNN, CBS and The New York Times, while lead singer Karl Buechner was invited to address the Congress about teens and substance abuse.

=== Comments from other musicians ===
Many artists have cited Earth Crisis as an influence or have expressed their admiration for them, including Davey Havok and Jade Puget of AFI and XTRMST, Hatebreed, Throwdown, Robb Flynn of Machine Head, Jona Weinhofen of I Killed the Prom Queen and Bring Me the Horizon, Jeremy Bolm of Touché Amoré, Tim McIlrath of Rise Against, Tim Lambesis of As I Lay Dying, Glassjaw, Andy Hurley and Pete Wentz of Fall Out Boy and Racetraitor, Igor Cavalera of Sepultura, Paul Waggoner and Thomas Giles of Between the Buried and Me, Matt Fox of Shai Hulud, Heaven Shall Burn, Unearth, Brian Cook of Botch, Code Orange, Guy Kozowyk of The Red Chord, Greg Bennick of Trial, Maroon, Deadlock, Marc Görtz of Caliban, Born from Pain, Saving Grace, Twelve Tribes, Dan Smith of The Dear & Departed, First Blood, No Innocent Victim and Clear; as well as activists such as Peter Daniel Young.

== Members ==
Current members

- Karl Buechner – vocals (1991–2001, 2007–present), bass (1989)
- Scott Crouse – lead guitar (1991–2001, 2007–present)
- Ian "Bulldog" Edwards – bass (1991–2001, 2007–present)
- Dennis Merrick – drums (1993–2001, 2007–present)
- Erick Edwards – rhythm guitar (1998–2001, 2007–present)

Former members

- DJ Rose – vocals (1989)
- John Moseman – guitar (1989)
- Jesse Buckley – drums (1989)
- Ben Read – rhythm guitar (1991–1994)
- Kris Wiechmann – rhythm guitar (1994–1998)
- Michael Riccardi – drums (1991–1993)

Former touring musicians

- Jim Winters – guitar (1993–1996)
- Andy Hurley – drums (2010)

Timeline

== Discography ==
Studio albums

- Destroy the Machines (1995, Victory Records)
- Gomorrah's Season Ends (1996, Victory Records)
- Breed the Killers (1998, Roadrunner Records)
- Slither (2000, Victory Records)
- Last of the Sane (2001, Victory Records)
- To the Death (2009, Century Media Records)
- Neutralize the Threat (2011, Century Media Records)
- Salvation of Innocents (2014, Candlelight Records)

Studio EPs

- All Out War (1992, Conviction Records)
- Firestorm (1993, Victory Records)
- The Discipline (2015, Bullet Tooth Records)
- Vegan for the Animals (2022, Fiveonone Music)

Live and compilation albums

- The California Takeover (1996, Victory Records); split live album with Strife and Snapcase
- The Oath That Keeps Me Free (1998, Victory Records); live album
- Forever True (1991–2001) (2001, Victory Records); retrospective compilation
- All Out War/Firestorm (2007, Victory Records); combination of two EPs
- The Return of the California Takeover (2021, Fiveonone Music); second split live album with Strife and Snapcase
- Earth Crisis / Integrity Split (2025, Holy Mountain Priting); split with Integrity

Singles

- "Broken Foundation" (1996, Victory Records)
- "Nemesis" (2000, Victory Records)
- "Slither" (2000, Victory Records)
- "Killing Brain Cells" (2000, Victory Records)
- "Forced to Kill" (2009, Seventh Dagger Records)
- "Into a Sea of Stone" (2011, Century Media Records)
- "Smash or Be Smashed" (2021, Decibel Flexi)

Music videos

- "Broken Foundation" (1996)
- "Killing Brain Cells" (2000)
- "Provoke" (2000)
- "Nemesis" (2000)
- "To Ashes" (2009)
- "Total War" (2011)

== See also ==
- Animal rights and punk subculture
