= Ivoryline =

American rock band

IVORYLINE
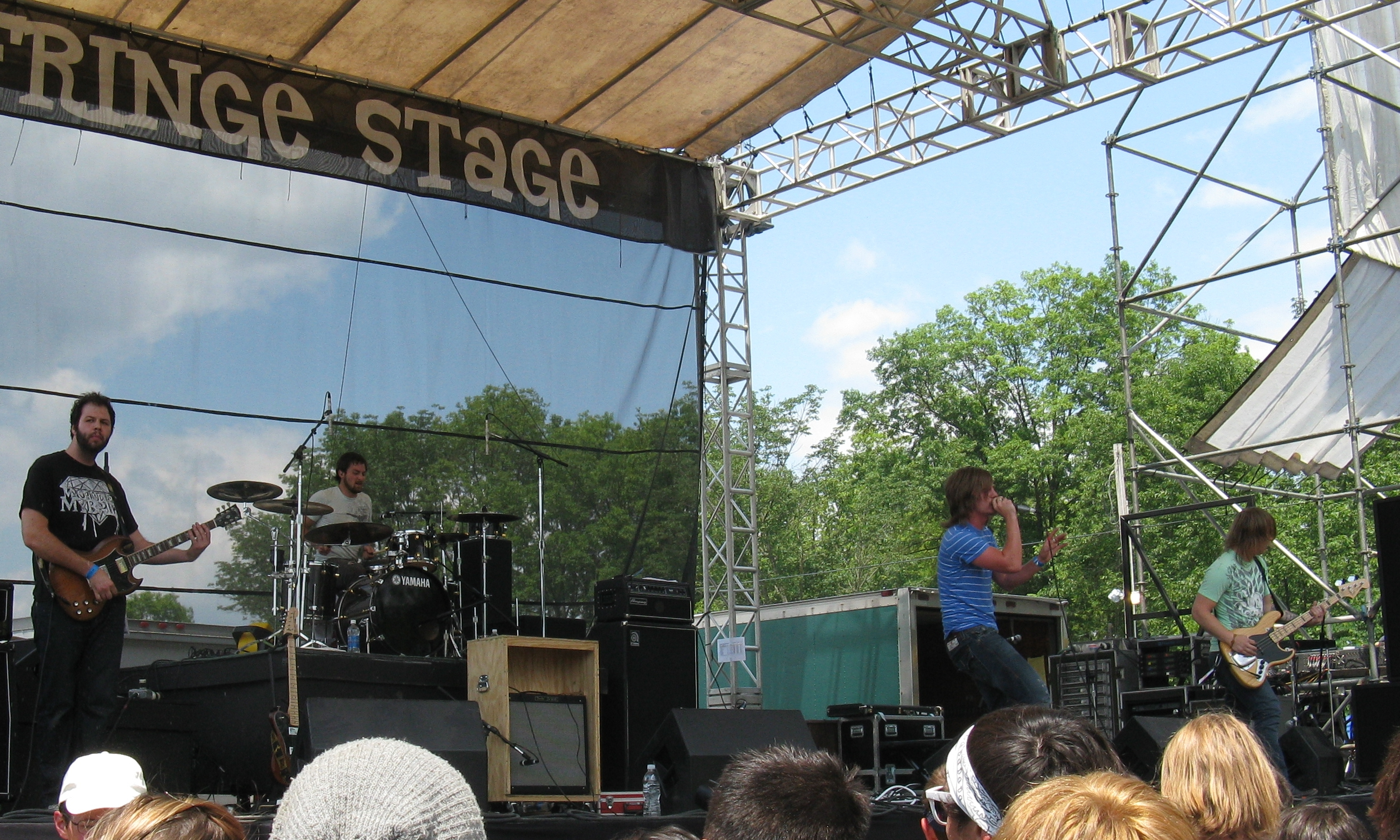
- Ivoryline playing at the 2009 Creation Festival

Background information
- Also known as: Dead End Driveway
- Origin: Tyler, Texas, United States
- Genres: Pop punk, alternative rock, Christian rock, post-hardcore
- Years active: 2003–2014
- Label: Tooth & Nail
- Members: Jeremy Gray; Dusty Kittle; Scott Socia; Wes Hart
- Past members: Shane Rivette; Brandon Crabtree; Robert Woodward; Scott Socia; Michael Bethancourt; Eric Meeks

Ivoryline is an American Christian rock band from Tyler, Texas, formerly signed to Tooth & Nail Records.

== History ==
Ivoryline formed in 2003 under the name Dead End Driveway, releasing an EP and an album under this name before changing the name to Ivoryline in 2005. Soon after the name change, the band was selected to play at the 2006 Vans Warped Tour. While on the tour, they were scouted by Tooth & Nail Records, who signed them in 2007 and released their debut full-length, There Came a Lion, in February 2008. The album hit No. 25 on the Billboard Top Christian Albums chart and No. 15 on the Top Heatseekers Chart.

The group toured with Automatic Loveletter in July 2008. In the fall of that year, Ivoryline toured with Family Force 5 and The Maine, before they embarked on their first headlining tour (called "There Came a Tour") with There For Tomorrow, In:Aviate, and The Lives of Famous Men.

In February 2009, they premiered their music video for "Days End" on AbsolutePunk.net—the video, filmed in mid-2008, includes their former guitarist and then was featured on the Summer Bailout tour with Emery, Maylene and the Sons of Disaster, Closure in Moscow and Secret & Whisper, then finished out the year on the Vans Warped Tour.They also filmed their music video Instincts and was picked up by Outerloop management under the care of Anthony "Yogi" Allgood.

During July & August of this year they toured alongside Dance Gavin Dance, Silverstein, and Emery on the Scream it Like You Mean It Tour that is actually owned by said manager. Ivoryline was a part of Creation Fest the Tour 2010 with Thousand Foot Krutch and Disciple.

The band's latest album, titled Vessels, was released July 27, 2010. The band was subsequently dropped from the Tooth and Nail label.

The most recent indication that there may be new Ivoryline material in the works was on June 30, 2014 when Wes Hart posted on Facebook that he had started working at a studio and wanted to make plans to record a new Ivoryline album. No update has been given since then, and posts on the band's social media pages have been minimal.

== Members ==
Current

- Jeremy Gray – vocals, guitar
- Dusty Kittle – guitar
- Wes Hart – drums
- Scott Socia – guitar

Former

- Shane Rivette – bass
- Brandon Crabtree – touring guitar
- Robert Woodward – bass
- Michael Bethancourt – guitar, synthesizer
- Eric Meeks – drums

== Discography ==
=== As Dead End Driveway ===
- 2003: Better Luck Next Year
- 2004: The Illusion Is Fading

=== As Ivoryline ===
==== Studio albums ====
List of studio albums with selected chart positions
Title	Details	Peak chart positions		
Title	Details	US	US Christ	US Heat.
The Life You Have	Released: 2006; Label: Independent	—	—	—
There Came a Lion	Released: 2008; Label: Tooth & Nail Records	—	25	15
Vessels	Released: July 27, 2010; Label: Tooth and Nail	—	25	13
"—" denotes a recording that did not chart or was not released in that territory.

==== Singles ====
List of studio albums with selected chart positions
Title	Year	Peak chart positions		Album
Title	Year	US Christ. Rock	US Christ. CHR	Album
"Be Still and Breathe"	2007	1	—	There Came a Lion
"Hearts and Minds"	2007	3	—	There Came a Lion
"Remind Me I'm Alive"	2008	1	—	There Came a Lion
"Days End"	2008	1	—	There Came a Lion
"Instincts"	2010	3	—	Vessels
"The Healing"	2010	1	—	Vessels
"Vessels"	2010	1	—	Vessels
"Hearts Open"	2010	—	28	Vessels
"—" denotes a recording that did not chart or was not released in that territory.

==== Music videos ====
Year	Song title	Album
2007	"Hearts and Minds"	There Came a Lion
2008	"Days End"	There Came a Lion
2010	"Instincts"	Vessels
