= To the Death (Earth Crisis album) =

Studio album by Earth Crisis
- Released: April 20, 2009
- Genre: Metalcore
- Length: 32:17
- Label: Century Media

Earth Crisis chronology
Forever True – 1991–2001 (2001)	To the Death (2009)	Neutralize the Threat (2011)

To the Death is the sixth studio album by American metalcore band Earth Crisis. It is the band's first album since they reunited in 2007. It is also their first recording for major label Century Media, released on April 20, 2009 in Europe and May 5, 2009 in North America.

== Critical reception ==
To the Death received generally positive reviews from music critics.

== Track listing ==
No.	Title	Length
1.	"Against the Current"	2:59
2.	"To Ashes"	2:39
3.	"So Others Live"	2:49
4.	"Security Threat Number One"	3:10
5.	"When Slaves Revolt"	3:23
6.	"Plague Bearers"	1:21
7.	"Control Through Fear"	3:28
8.	"Cities Fall"	3:27
9.	"Eye of Babylon"	2:26
10.	"What Horrifies"	3:08
11.	"To the Death"	3:27
Total length:		32:17

Special Limited edition (Environment Friendly Packing)
No.	Title	Length
12.	"State of Fear"	3:00
13.	"Not One Remains"	3:13

== Personnel ==
- Karl Buechner - vocals
- Scott Crouse - guitar
- Erick Edwards - guitar
- Ian "Bulldog" Edwards - bass
- Dennis Merrick - drums
