= Neutralize the Threat =

Studio album by Earth Crisis
- Released: July 12, 2011
- Genre: Metalcore
- Length: 30:11; 37:06 (limited edition)
- Label: Century Media
- Producer: Zeuss

Earth Crisis chronology
To the Death (2009)	Neutralize the Threat (2011)	Salvation of Innocents (2014)

Professional ratings
Review scores
Source	Rating
Metal.de	7/10
Metal Temple	10/10
Reflections of Darkness	7.5/10

Neutralize the Threat is the seventh album by American metalcore band Earth Crisis. It was released on July 12, 2011 through Century Media.

== Track listing ==
All tracks are written by Karl Buechner and Scott Crouse

No.	Title	Length
1.	"Raise"	1:26
2.	"Neutralize the Threat"	3:38
3.	"Total War"	3:40
4.	"100-Kiloton Blast"	3:34
5.	"Counterstrike"	2:42
6.	"By Conscience Compelled"	3:17
7.	"Black Talons Tear"	3:18
8.	"Askari"	2:39
9.	"The Eradicators"	3:01
10.	"Raze"	3:03
Total length:		30:11

Limited edition
No.	Title	Length
11.	"Into a Sea of Stone"	3:42
12.	"Void"	3:13

== Personnel ==
Earth Crisis

- Karl Buechner - vocals
- Scott Crouse - guitar
- Erick Edwards - guitar
- Ian "Bulldog" Edwards - bass
- Dennis Merrick - drums

Production

- Zeuss - producer
- Ryan Clark - artwork
