= Islander (band) =

American alternative metal band

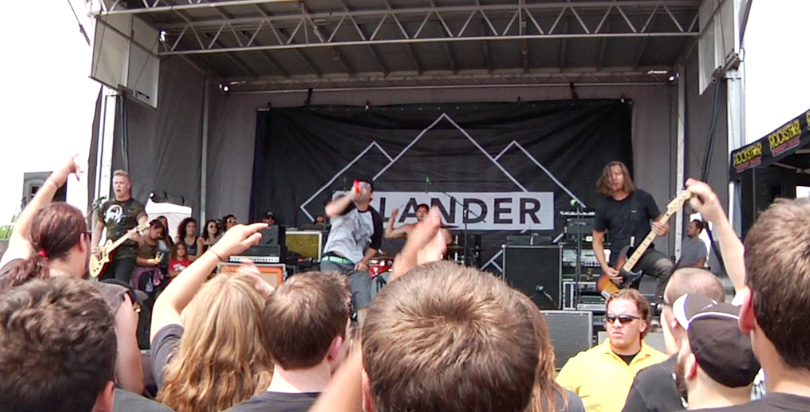
- Islander in 2014

Background information
- Origin: Greenville, South Carolina, U.S.
- Genres: Nu metal; alternative metal; post-hardcore; hard rock
- Years active: 2011–present
- Labels: ESLG; Victory; Outerloop; Better Noise
- Members: Mikey Carvajal; Chris Carvajal
- Past members: Andrew Murphy; Chris Doot; Eric Frazier; J.R. Bareis; Ezekiel Vasquez; Arin Ilejay; Erik Shea
- Website: Islander on Facebook

Islander is an American rock band from Greenville, South Carolina, founded in 2011. Their releases include numerous singles as well as two EPs, Side Effects of Youth (2012) and Pains. (2013), and four studio albums, Violence & Destruction (2014), Power Under Control (2016), It's Not Easy Being Human (2022), and Grammy Nominated (2024). The band is known for its uniquely dynamic and interactive live performances, as noted in various concert review publications.

== History ==
The original members of Islander hail from Greenville, South Carolina, and have been playing together since 2006. The group broke up for a few years and later reunited under the name Islander in 2011.

Islander vocalist Mikey Carvajal is a participant in the non-profit outreach organization known as The Whosoevers. Some members of the organization include Brian "Head" Welch and Reginald "Fieldy" Arvizu of Korn, Sonny Sandoval of P.O.D., Lacey Sturm of Flyleaf, and motivational speaker Ryan Ries.

On June 17, 2016, the band released a new song, titled "Darkness", with the lineup of J.R. Bareis (Love & Death) on Guitar, Ezekiel Vasquez (ex-ForeverAtLast) on Bass, and Arin Ilejay (ex-Confide, ex-Avenged Sevenfold) on Drums. The new song, and album Power Under Control, indicated a mixture on Nu-metal, emo, punk rock and alternative metal. On June 20, 2016, the band released "Bad Guy" from the upcoming Power Under Control, which will be released through the band's label Victory Records on August 5, 2016. On August 4, 2016, Alternative Press put out a stream for Islander's Power Under Control, the album to be released through Victory and produced by Cameron Webb, who also produced Violence & Destruction, at NRG Studios.

On August 31, 2018, Eleventyseven lead singer Matt Langston interviewed Mikey Carvajal on the Eleventylife podcast and discussed the music industry, growing up in the South Carolina, and navigating band politics.

In March 2020, during the COVID-19 Pandemic, the band released a cover of the R.E.M. song "It's the End of the World as We Know It (And I Feel Fine)". The release was dedicated to lead singer Mikey Carvajal's aunt, who had recently died as a result of the virus. A portion of proceeds from the release were donated to the NYC Low-Income Artist + Freelancer Relief Fund.

== Music ==
Victory Records signed the band in September 2013, and soon released their second EP, Pains. Their first studio album, Violence & Destruction, was released the next year. The music's material was generally well received by critics, as the first single off the Violence & Destruction, entitled "Coconut Dracula", has since been a very successful active rock radio hit, as it hit number 23 on the Billboard Mainstream Rock chart. On January 13, the band released a music video for the track "New Wave", the highly anticipated follow-up to the "Coconut Dracula" music video, which premiered exclusively on Billboard.

In February 2021, the band released a new single, called The Outsider. In an interview, lead singer Mikey Carvajal described it as "a song for anyone that feels like an outcast [or] is struggling to fit in." The song later appeared on the 2022 album It's Not Easy Being Human.

The band has received support from many big names within the music community. Sonny Sandoval of P.O.D. said "New school band with old school soul and passion. Keep your eyes and ears open for these guys!". Brian "Head" Welch of Korn and Love and Death tweeted "A new, unique, sick band with a CD full of great songs. You won't regret getting Islander." Lacey Sturm of the band Flyleaf tweeted a picture of Violence & Destruction stating it was her "New Favorite Music".

On June 28, 2024, the band released its independently produced fourth studio album, Grammy Nominated. The album was fan-funded through a Kickstarter campaign launched the previous summer.

== Touring ==
The group toured with the Mayhem Festival 2014 tour including label acts Emmure, Ill Niño and Wretched in the summer of 2014, followed by tours with Otherwise, Nonpoint and Pop Evil in the fall. Islander began a U.S. tour with Papa Roach, Seether and Kyng in early January 2015, extending until early February. In 2019, they provided direct support for Blessthefall and Escape The Fate on their joint ten-year anniversary tour. Other acts they have toured with include P.O.D., Red, I Prevail, and Korn. They have also headlined several of their own tours, receiving support from acts such as The Funeral Portrait and Palaye Royale. They have played at numerous Rock Festivals such as Carolina Rebellion, Rock on the Range, Shiprocked, and Welcome to Rockville, with artists such as Marilyn Manson, Slipknot, The Red Jumpsuit Apparatus, and Linkin Park. In 2025, they are on tour with Lacey Sturm on their Kenotic Metanoia tour.

== Style ==
Their music is similar to Deftones, Glassjaw, Korn, Papa Roach, Limp Bizkit, Mudvayne, P.O.D., and Rage Against the Machine because musically it is alternative metal and rap metal, all the while, having a nu metal sound featuring the subsets alternative rock, hard rock, punk rock, and post-hardcore. Chino Moreno, Daryl Palumbo, Jonathan Davis, Fred Durst, Chad Gray, Sonny Sandoval, Zack de la Rocha are cited as vocal similarities to Carvajal.

== Band members ==
Current

- Mikey Carvajal – lead vocals (2011–present)
- Chris Carvajal – bass, keyboards (2017–present)

Touring

- Tyler Armenta – drums (2021–2026)
- Joey Donhowe - drums (2026–present)
- Michael Thomas - guitars (2026–present)

Former

- Andrew Murphy – guitars (2011–2014)
- Chris Doot – bass (2011–2015)
- Eric Frazier – drums (2011–2015)
- J.R. Bareis – guitars, backing vocals (2014–2017), bass (2015)
- Ezekiel Vasquez – bass, backing vocals (2015–2017)
- Arin Ilejay – drums (2015–2017)
- Erik Shea – guitars, bass (2017–2026)

Timeline

== Discography ==
=== EPs ===
- Side Effects of Youth (Independent, 2012)
- Pains. (Victory Records, 2013)

=== Studio albums ===
Year	Title	Peak Chart Positions			Label
Year	Title	US Hard	US Heat.	US Indie.	Label
2014	Violence & Destruction	—	40	—	Victory Records
2016	Power Under Control	18	9	38	Victory Records
2022	It's Not Easy Being Human	—	—	—	Better Noise Music
2024	Grammy Nominated	—	—	—	Independent

=== Singles ===
Title	Year	Peak chart positions	Album
Title	Year	US Main.	Album
"Coconut Dracula"	2014	23	Violence & Destruction
"New Wave"	2015	22	Violence & Destruction
"Cold Speak"	2015	25	Violence & Destruction
"Bad Guy"	2016	28	Power Under Control
"Summer"	2017	×	Non-album single
"I Want Sushi"	2018	×	Non-album single
"My Friends"	2018	×	It's Not Easy Being Human
"Freedom"	2020	×	It's Not Easy Being Human
"Crazy Crazy World"	2020	×	It's Not Easy Being Human
"The Outsider"	2021	×	It's Not Easy Being Human
"What Do You Gotta Lose?"	2021	×	It's Not Easy Being Human
"Skin Crawl (feat. Bruce Fitzhugh of Living Sacrifice, Daniel Weydant of Zao, and Brian "Head" Welch of Korn)"	2022	×	It's Not Easy Being Human
"Serpents & Daggers"	2023	×	Grammy Nominated
"Witch"	2023	×	Grammy Nominated
"Kayfabe"	2023	×	Grammy Nominated
"Ritual Of Death"	2024	×	Grammy Nominated
"What A Time To Be Alive"	2024	×	Grammy Nominated

=== Music videos ===
Title	Year	Director(s)
"Death Is the Shepherd"	2012	Mikey Carvajal
"New Colors"	2013	Mikey Carvajal
"Coconut Dracula"	2014	Eric Ritcher
"New Wave"	2015	Eric Ritcher
"Bad Guy"	2016	Dustin Smith
"Darkness"	2016	Dustin Smith
"Better Day"	2017	Nathan Mowery
"Casket"	2017	Nathan Mowery
"Summer"	2017	Nathan Mowery
"I Want Sushi"	2018	Nathan Mowery
"My Friends"	2018	Nathan Mowery
"Crazy Crazy World"	2020	Nathan Mowery
"The Outsider"	2021	Nathan Mowery
"What Do You Gotta Lose?"	2021	Nathan Mowery
"Skateboard Flowers"	2022	Islander
"Evil"	2022	Mikey Carvajal, Chris Carvajal
"It’s Not Easy Being Human"	2022	Mikey Carvajal
"We Scream"	2022	Mikey Carvajal
"Serpents & Daggers"	2023	Mikey Carvajal
"Witch"	2023	Islander
"Ritual of Death"	2024	Mikey Carvajal
"What a Time To Be Alive"	2024	Islander
"Die Dreaming (Morir Soñando)"	2024	Luke Asper
