= There Came a Lion =

Studio album by Ivoryline
- Released: February 5, 2008
- Recorded: 2007
- Genre: Christian rock, pop punk
- Length: 39:54
- Label: Tooth & Nail
- Producer: Aaron Sprinkle

Ivoryline chronology
The Life You Have EP (2006)	There Came a Lion (2008)	Vessels (2010)

Professional ratings
Review scores
Source	Rating
Jesus Freak Hideout	link

There Came a Lion is an album by Ivoryline. It was released on February 5, 2008, through Tooth & Nail Records.

== Track listing ==
1. "Days End" – 3:08
2. "We Both Know" – 3:06
3. "Parade" – 3:38
4. "All You Ever Hear" – 4:06
5. "Be Still and Breathe" – 3:26
6. "Remind Me I'm Alive" – 3:33
7. "Left Us Falling" – 3:03
8. "And the Truth Will End This" – 3:50
9. "Bravery" – 3:59
10. "Hearts and Minds" – 3:47
11. "The Last Words" – 4:22
