= Last of the Sane =

Studio album by Earth Crisis
- Released: January 23, 2001
- Genre: Hardcore punk
- Length: 37:55
- Label: Victory

Earth Crisis chronology
Slither (2000)	Last of the Sane (2001)	Forever True – 1991–2001 (2001)

Professional ratings
Review scores
Source	Rating
Allmusic	3/5 stars

Last of the Sane is the fifth album by the American metalcore band Earth Crisis, which was released in 2001. After this album the band split up and Karl Buechner, Erick Edwards and Bulldog went on to form the band Freya. This album consists of seven covers of songs by other bands, three demo versions of earlier songs, and a new track titled "Panic Floods".

== Track listing ==
1. "Hell Awaits (Intro)" (Slayer) – 2:24
2. "The Wanton Song" (Led Zeppelin) – 4:17
3. "Children of the Grave" (Black Sabbath) – 4:42
4. "Paint it Black" (Rolling Stones) – 2:40
5. "Holiday In Cambodia" (Dead Kennedys) – 4:18
6. "City to City" (DYS) – 1:58
7. "Earth A.D." (The Misfits) – 2:44
8. "The Order" – 3:40
9. "Broken Foundation" – 4:07
10. "Gomorrah's Season Ends" – 3:29
11. "Panic Floods" – 3:36

== Credits ==
- Karl Buechner – vocals
- Scott Crouse – guitar
- Erick Edwards – guitar
- Bulldog – bass
- Dennis Merrick – drums

== Trivia ==
- On the back of the album some tracks are mislabeled. Track 3 is actually "Children of the Grave", track 4 is "Paint it Black", and track 6 is "City to City".
