= Destroy the Machines =

Studio album by Earth Crisis
- Released: May 25, 1995
- Recorded: October–November 1994
- Genre: Metalcore
- Length: 34:10
- Label: Victory

Earth Crisis chronology
| Firestorm (1993) | Destroy the Machines (1995) | Gomorrah's Season Ends (1996) |

Professional ratings
Review scores
| Source | Rating |
|---|---|
| AllMusic | 4/5 stars |

Destroy the Machines is the debut studio album by American metalcore band Earth Crisis, it was released in 1995. It is widely considered a landmark release in metalcore.

== Music and lyrics ==
Earth Crisis recorded Destroy the Machines in the studio of progressive thrash metal band Believer in Pennsylvania, being introduced to them by friend Jim Winters of Conviction, who also toured with Earth Crisis. Guitarist Scott Crouse, who admired Believer, was inspired by them to practice arduously and improve his technique. On the album, the band determined to make the songs sound like "somebody continuously hitting something with a hammer", picturing every song as "pounding, pounding, [and] pounding." MetalSucks described Destroy the Machines as a "hardcore take on the Pantera/Exhorder/Prong school of late 80s-early 90s power groove thrash".

Commenting on the lyrics, Allmusic stated that "[they] burn with resentment directed at those who (in the estimation of vocalist Karl Buechner) bring contamination and death to the earth and the defenseless creatures that reside on it." The overall theme is an approaching ecological apocalypse, the destruction of defenseless creatures, self-destruction, and a means of liberation which is proposed as being veganism and straight edge. By the time of the tour in 1995, Buechner was personally taking care of twelve rescued animals from Syracuse Wildlife Rehabilitation Center, where he volunteered.

== Legacy ==
The Dutch band Born from Pain and the Argentinian band Nueva Ética ("New Ethic" in Spanish) are named after songs from the album. In March 2015, celebrating the release of The Discipline EP which re-released songs from Destroy the Machines, several musicians and animal right activists paid tribute to it, including Davey Havok of AFI, Andy Hurley of Fall Out Boy, Peter Daniel Young and Toby Morse of H_{2}O.

The song "Forced March" was covered by Between the Buried and Me on their 2006 album The Anatomy Of. "Born from Pain" was covered by Eighteen Visions on their covers album 1996 (2021). "The Wrath of Sanity" was covered by First Blood on their 2012 album FBI Vol. 1. "The Wrath of Sanity" is quoted in the songs "No Contest" (2005) by Gather and "Rules of Conviction" (2017) by First Blood and Jesse Barnett, the latter of which was dedicated to Earth Crisis and Path of Resistance. Maroon quotes Destroy the Machines in their 2006 song "24HourHate".

An increase of animal rights activism corresponded with the rise of vegan straight edge bands during the 1990s, a phenomenon which activist Peter Daniel Young attributes largely to Destroy the Machines.

In April 2018, NME named Destroy the Machines one of the fifteen best hardcore punk albums of all time. Kerrang! placed it among "The 21 Best U.S. Metalcore Albums of All Time." In 2017, Loudwire ranked Destroy the Machines 7th on its list of the best metalcore albums of all time. Dan Gump of Life Sentence Records named it the most representative album of the 1990s. In 2020, John Hill of Loudwire included the album in his list of the "Top 25 Metalcore Albums of All Time."

== Track listing ==
All songs written by Karl Buechner.

| No. | Title | Length |
|---|---|---|
| 1. | "Forced March" | 3:48 |
| 2. | "Born from Pain" | 3:16 |
| 3. | "Destroy the Machines" | 3:12 |
| 4. | "New Ethic" | 2:53 |
| 5. | "The Discipline" | 3:47 |
| 6. | "Deliverance" | 3:09 |
| 7. | "Inherit the Wasteland" | 2:50 |
| 8. | "Asphyxiate" | 2:56 |
| 9. | "The Wrath of Sanity" | 3:51 |
| 10. | "Fortress" | 4:29 |
| Total length: | | 34:10 |

== Credits ==
- Karl Buechner - vocals
- Scott Crouse - lead guitar
- Ian Edwards - bass
- Dennis Merrick - drums
- Kris Wiechmann - rhythm guitar
