= Breed the Killers =

Studio album by Earth Crisis
- Released: September 8, 1998
- Recorded: Pyramid Studios, Ithaca, NY
- Genres: Metalcore, hardcore punk
- Length: 41:38
- Labels: Roadrunner, I Scream
- Producer: Andy Sneap

Earth Crisis chronology
Gomorrah's Season Ends (1996)	Breed the Killers (1998)	Slither (2000)

Professional ratings
Review scores
Source	Rating
AllMusic	3/5 stars
Terrorizer	8/10 stars

Breed the Killers is the third full-length studio album by the American metallic hardcore band Earth Crisis, released in 1998. It was their major label debut and only release for Roadrunner Records, before subsequently returning to Victory Records. The last song on the album "Ecocide" is a re-recording of a song from their first release, All Out War.

The record was re-released on November 4, 2008 in the United States (November 7 in Europe) by I Scream Records. The album was remastered and features two live bonus tracks.

== Track listing ==
No.	Title	Length
1.	"End Begins"	3:10
2.	"Filthy Hands to Famished Mouths"	2:59
3.	"Breed the Killers"	3:50
4.	"Wither"	3:20
5.	"Ultramilitance"	4:43
6.	"Into the Fray"	3:16
7.	"One Against All"	4:19
8.	"Drug Related Homicide"	2:45
9.	"Overseers"	3:13
10.	"Death Rate Solution"	3:06
11.	"Unvanquished"	3:40
12.	"Ecocide"	3:19
Total length:		41:38

Live bonus tracks
No.	Title	Length
13.	"No Allegiance" (live bonus track)	2:51
14.	"Standing Corpses" (live bonus track)	3:39
Total length:		48:08

== Credits ==
- Karl Buechner - vocals
- Scott Crouse - guitar
- Eric Edwards - guitar
- Bulldog - bass
- Dennis Merrick - drums
- Screaming Lord Sneap - additional guitar on "Ultramilitance"
- Robb Flynn from Machine Head - additional vocals on "One Against All"
