= Violence & Destruction =

Studio album by Islander
- Released: July 8, 2014
- Recorded: Early 2014
- Studios: Maple Studios (Orange County, California); NRG Recording Studios (North Hollywood, Los Angeles)
- Genres: Nu metal; alternative metal; post-hardcore; hardcore punk
- Length: 37:44
- Label: Victory
- Producer: Cameron Webb

Islander chronology
Pains. EP (2013)	Violence & Destruction (2014)

Singles from Violence & Destruction
- 1. "Coconut Dracula" Released: May 6, 2014; 2. "New Wave" Released: January 13, 2015; 3. "Cold Speak" Released: September 1, 2015

Violence & Destruction is the debut studio album by American rock band Islander. The album was produced by Cameron Webb and released on July 8, 2014, by Victory Records. It is the only album from the band to feature Andrew Murphy, Chris Doot and Eric Frazier on guitar, bass and drums, respectively.

== Recording and production ==
Islander are a four-piece group from Greenville, South Carolina, whose first release was the EP Pains. (2013).

Violence & Destruction was recorded in early 2014 in studios in Southern California: Maple, in Orange County, and NRG Recording in North Hollywood, Los Angeles. Producer Cameron Webb had worked with such acts as Kelly Clarkson, Motörhead, Pennywise, Silverstein, Weezer and Alkaline Trio.

== Composition ==
Critics compared the album to P.O.D. (The Fundamental Elements of Southtown) and the Deftones (Around the Fur) for its "different" sound. Singer Carvajal has been compared to Chino Moreno and Sonny Sandoval; while critic Rob Houston appreciated the vocals, some felt putt off because of his "shameless, and almost smarmy sounding" performance, especially the "'woos'". Big Cheese notes "this four-piece blends the atmospheric musicality of Deftones with the rap rock attitude of Fred Durst, with powerful results." Rock Sound says "Despite sounding like the odds are stacked against them, Islander stand a good chance of survival with their 100 per cent accurate nu metal recreations." They went onto write Islander "exhumed P.O.D.'s corpse (or did it rise from the dead itself?) with forensic precision and mated it with Chino Moreno's haunting croon."

== Release ==
The album was released on July 8, 2014, through label imprint Victory Records. To promote the album the band toured on the Mayhem Festival 2014, playing on the Victory Records Stage with label mates Emmure, Ill Niño and Wretched.

The song "Coconut Dracula" was released as the first single from Violence & Destruction. The video for the song begins with a group of kids wearing masks entering an abandoned building. As two of the kids cause further damage to the building, one of them breaks away and finds smoke flares. Two of the kids exit the building before walking around the streets of a city. One of the kids breaks off onto his own, wandering the streets. The exploits of the children are inter-cut with footage of the band performing the song and driving at night.

== Critical reception ==
Professional ratings
Review scores
Source	Rating
About.com	3/5 stars
Alternative Press	3/5 stars
Big Cheese	8/10
HM Magazine	5/5 stars
Jesus Freak Hideout	4/5 stars
Music Connection	7/10
New Noise Magazine	4.5/5 stars
Outburn	8/10
Rock Sound	6/10
Substream Magazine	3.5/5 stars

Violence & Destruction was welcomed with predominantly positive reviews. John Hill from Noisey exclaimed,

Their new track "Coconut Dracula" shows a lot of restraint with their influences, allowing them to just fucking play. Islander's able to really illustrate the potential of this genre. They sonically demonstrate that fragile dichotomy between softness and weight in a riff, and juggle it around over catchy hooks. I don't know what the fuck a Coconut Dracula is (I hope it's some kind of drink) but this track still WRECKS.

In a five-star review in HM Magazine, Rob Houston stated that Violence & Destruction will be able to hold its own for years." Amy Sciarretto, writing for Outburn, praised the album for its "funked out riffs, throatily wrapped vocals, and rage drenched sentiments", giving it an eight out of ten. In an eight out of ten review from Big Cheese, Paula Frost described it as

Hollering through 12 tracks in a passionate mix of soft singing besides raw intensity, frontman Mickey comes across as an urban realist. Next to the influence of Rage Against The Machine and non-stop thrashing, 'Violence And Destruction' is at times an intimate set of songs. Mixing rock, metal and hip-hop, 'Violence And Destruction' simply doesn't let up.

In New Noise Magazine, Nathaniel Lay gave it four and a half stars: "From start to finish, Violence & Destruction has a lot of greatness to share with its listeners". In a four-star review for Jesus Freak Hideout, Michael Weaver said the album was interesting because the band "put together a really solid collection of songs 13 years or so after the genre [nu-metal] died." Chad Bowar, for About.com, thought the album "wide-ranging" for its content, and gave it three stars. In a three-star review in Alternative Press, Jason Schreurs wrote that the band "tries too hard to create a sound that can easily be compartmentalized by its influences". Tim Dodderidge, in Substream Magazine, said that "the biggest problem is that these guys still need to fully develop their style into their own", giving the album three and a half stars. Awarding the album a six out of ten, Sarah O'Connor at Rock Sound felt

The Downside? Their relative lack of fresh ideas means the songs need to be on point, and they aren't quite there. Their Deftones influence is a little too overbearing and there's a feeling that it needs to be stripped back before Islander can make any progress of their own.

== Track listing ==
All tracks are written by Islander.

No.	Title	Length
1.	"Counteract"	2:48
2.	"The Sadness of Graves"	3:04
3.	"Coconut Dracula"	4:07
4.	"Cold Speak"	3:09
5.	"Pains"	3:56
6.	"Kingdom"	4:03
7.	"Side Effects of Youth"	2:29
8.	"New Wave"	3:44
9.	"Criminals" (featuring Sonny Sandoval)	3:00
10.	"Mira"	1:16
11.	"Hearts Grow Cold"	2:50
12.	"Violence & Destruction"	3:18
Total length:		37:44

== Personnel ==
- Mikey Carvajal – vocals
- Andrew Murphy – guitars
- Chris Doot – bass
- Eric Frazier – drums

=== Additional personnel ===
- Sonny Sandoval
- Cameron Webb – production

== Charts ==
"Coconut Dracula"
Chart (2014)	Peak positions
US Mainstream Rock	23
