= Vessels (Ivoryline album) =

Studio album by Ivoryline
- Released: July 27, 2010
- Recorded: 2009–2010
- Genre: Christian rock, alternative rock
- Label: Tooth & Nail Records
- Producer: Aaron Sprinkle

Ivoryline chronology
There Came a Lion (2008)	Vessels (2010)

Vessels is the third album by American alternative rock band Ivoryline, and their second with record label Tooth & Nail, released on July 27, 2010.

== Track listing ==
All tracks are written by Ivoryline and Aaron Sprinkle.

Album release
No.	Title	Length
1.	"The Healing" (featuring Jason Vena of Acceptance)	2:58
2.	"With the Daylight"	3:07
3.	"Search Me Out"	3:47
4.	"Instincts"	3:24
5.	"Hearts Open"	3:27
6.	"Vessels"	3:07
7.	"No One Else"	3:38
8.	"Walking Dead"	3:03
9.	"Broken Bodies"	3:35
10.	"The Greatest Love"	4:06
11.	"Made from Dust"	4:37
12.	"Naked"	3:19
13.	"You Bring Fire"	4:09
Total length:		46:12
