= Seventh Dagger Records =

American independent record label

- Founded: 2001
- Founder: Daniel Trudel
- Genre: Hardcore, metalcore
- Country of origin: U.S.
- Location: Creedmoor, North Carolina, US

Seventh Dagger Records is an independent record label releasing primarily hardcore and metalcore albums. It was founded in 2001 by Daniel "Sober" Trudel and is based in Creedmoor, North Carolina.

Formed as a clothing company, Seventh Dagger became popular for its straight edge apparel and "Kill your local drug dealer" shirts.

== Seventh Dagger Fest ==
The first annual Seventh Dagger Fest was held on May 24 and 25, 2008 at The Mad Hatter in Covington, Kentucky. The two-day event featured Seventh Dagger bands such as Rhinoceros, Eyes to the Sky, Tyrant, AFB, Birth of a Hero and The World We Knew as well as other well-known straight edge bands like Thick as Blood and Suicide Pact.

== Distribution ==
In September 2007, Seventh Dagger signed a deal for physical and digital distribution with East West via Warner Bros Distribution. Seventh Dagger later pulled out of the deal and released the following statement:

"Why would we end that is what you would probably ask? The answer is simple, Seventh Dagger is something I have worked on for the last almost 7 years and I saw this deal being the end of the label as it was and is. I saw this as trading the underground status and soul of the label for the potential to sell more CDs and let's face it if I was here to make money I would have left a long time ago. Being a straight edge, hardcore record label is the epitome of being underground or cult and the truth of the matter is that is where we should be. Straight edge is not for the masses and it never will be, so as I see it we might have made a minor buzz for a minute then the world would move on and not give a shit and we would have been tied to some corporate distribution that I am sure could [sic] have cared less about us."

== Artists ==
=== Current acts ===
- Blade
- Blackout Rage
- The Dead Man’s Chest
- Domestic War
- Eyes to the Sky
- Ghost Ship
- One Choice
- Parasitic Skies
- Represent
- Search Bloc

=== Past acts ===
- Barcadia
- AFB
- Awaken Demons
- Birth of a Hero
- Bishop
- Cherem
- Conqueror
- Cool Your Jets
- Earth Crisis
- In This Defiance
- The Miles Between
- No Zodiac
- Praying for Cleansing
- Rhinoceros
- The War
- Tyrant
- The World We Knew
- The Wrath

== See also ==
- List of record labels
