= Abandoned by Bears =

Swedish easycore musical group

- Origin: Gothenburg/Trelleborg, Sweden
- Genres: Easycore
- Years active: 2012–present
- Label: Victory Records
- Members: Fredric Andersson; Leon Ekelund; Jacob Devinder; Gustav Eriksson; Max Fahlman

Abandoned by Bears is a Swedish easycore band composed of vocalists Frederic Andersson and Leon Ekelund, guitarist Jacob Devinder, bassist Gustav Eriksson, and drummer Max Fahlman.

== History ==
The band was formed after each member quit their old band. Their first release was their independent EP, Bear Sides, in 2013. They then followed Bear Sides with another EP titiled When Nothing Goes Right, Go Left!, in 2014. They then released their debut album, The Years Ahead on Victory Records in 2016. In 2018, they released a second album titiled Headstorm. Unlike previous albums, they hired Swedish drummer Buster Odeholm (of Humanity's Last Breath and Vildhjarta fame) to mix and master the album.

== Members ==
=== Current line-up ===
- Fredric Andersson - vocals
- Leon Ekelund - vocals
- Jacob Devinder - guitar
- Gustav Eriksson - bass guitar
- Max Fahlman - drums

== Discography ==
=== Studio albums ===
- The Years Ahead (2016)
- Headstorm (2018)

=== Extended plays ===
- Bear Sides (2013)
- When Nothing Goes Right, Go Left! (2014)

=== Singles ===
- "Good Terms" (2016)
