= Slither (album) =

Studio album by Earth Crisis
- Released: June 20, 2000
- Genre: Nu metal
- Length: 42:53
- Label: Victory
- Producer: Steve Evetts

Earth Crisis chronology
| Breed the Killers (1998) | Slither (2000) | Last of the Sane (2001) |

Professional ratings
Review scores
| Source | Rating |
|---|---|
| AllMusic | 1.5/5 stars |
| Chronicles of Chaos | 8/10 |
| The Encyclopedia of Popular Music | 4/5 stars |
| Punknews.org | .5/5 stars |

Slither is the fourth full-length album by the American metalcore band Earth Crisis, released in 2000. It marked a return to Victory Records following the band's 1998 Roadrunner Records album Breed the Killers. Slither marked a departure from the band's metalcore sound and ventured into the nu metal sound popularized by '90s metal bands such as Korn and Deftones. The album peaked at No. 50 on the Billboard Top Heatseekers chart.

== Production ==
The album was produced by Steve Evetts. The album cover was designed by the artist Dave McKean.

== Reception ==
Chronicles of Chaos wrote: "Managing to stir up enough emotion and deafening cries of aggression, the band storms through a sonic assault of heavy vibes and mosh pit worthy material—and the music of Slither is also chock-full of strong harmonies to boot." The Telegram & Gazette wrote that the songs "boast rich textures as the band combines its old hard-core raucousness with a freshly developed 'clean' heavy-rock sound." The New Straits Times thought that "the lyrics are often contrived and meaningless, which diminishes the power of the music somewhat."

== Track listing ==
| No. | Title | Length |
|---|---|---|
| 1. | "Loss of Humanity" | 0:51 |
| 2. | "Slither" | 4:00 |
| 3. | "Provoke" | 3:17 |
| 4. | "Nemesis" | 5:00 |
| 5. | "Agress" | 3:38 |
| 6. | "Biomachines" | 3:34 |
| 7. | "Killing Brain Cells" | 3:15 |
| 8. | "Arc of Descent" | 2:57 |
| 9. | "Mechanism" | 3:15 |
| 10. | "Behind the Wire" | 2:34 |
| 11. | "Mass Arrest" | 3:31 |
| 12. | "Hairtrigger" | 3:57 |
| 13. | "Escape" | 2:59 |
| Total length: | | 42:53 |

== Credits ==
- Karl Buechner – vocals
- Scott Crouse – guitar
- Erick Edwards – guitar
- Ian "Bulldog" Edwards – bass
- Dennis Merrick – drums
