= Peter Young (activist) =

American animal rights activist

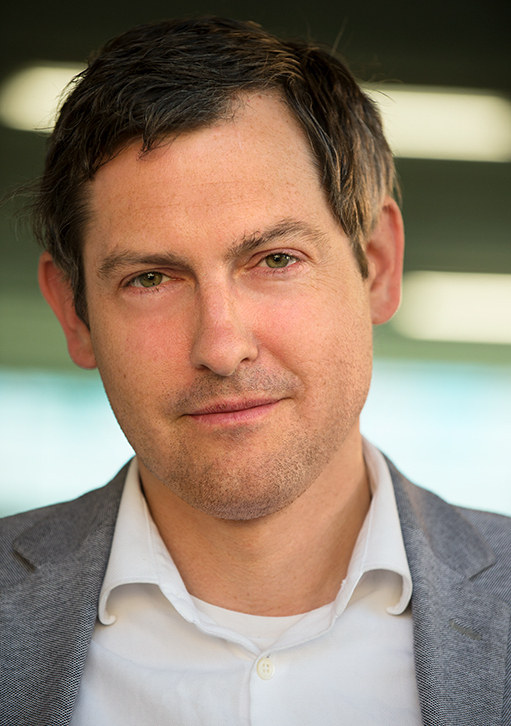
Peter Young

Peter Daniel Young is an American animal rights activist. He was the first American indicted by a federal grand jury on charges of Animal Enterprise Terrorism related to fur farm raids in Iowa, South Dakota, and Wisconsin in 1997. He went into hiding for seven years before being arrested in San Jose and sentenced to two years' imprisonment in 2005. Young was released in February, 2007.

== Early life ==
Young grew up in Los Gatos, California. At the age of nine, his family moved to Mercer Island, Washington, near Seattle, where he graduated from Mercer Island High School in 1995. He became vegan in 1994. Young describes himself as becoming more aware of animal testing and factory farming after visiting a chicken slaughterhouse in the Seattle Chinatown-International District. Vegan straight edge bands like Vegan Reich, Earth Crisis, and Raid also contributed to his awareness: "The vegan straightedge scene is directly responsible for the course my life has taken." He participated in a campus animal rights group at the University of Washington, but was not a student there.

He was arrested in 1997 with several local activists for squatting a Mercer Island home owned by the Department of Transportation. Inside the home, police found books on explosives, animal tranquilizers, and ALF literature. Young was named by police as a suspect in recent vandalism at fast food restaurants and one incident at a local mink farm.

== Fur farm raids ==
A two-week period in October, 1997 saw the release of at least 8,000 mink and 100 foxes from six fur farms in Iowa, South Dakota, and Wisconsin, along with the destruction of the breeding records at each farm. Around the same time, Young and a friend, Justin Samuel, set off from Washington with the plan to release animals from fur farms in the Midwest. On October 28, police officers in Sheboygan County, Wisconsin pulled them over after received a call from fur farmers who suspected that the two were surveying farms. Their vehicle was impounded, and a search warrant application was granted the following day. The search of their vehicle yielded wire cutters, fur farm addresses, and other suspicious items. An FBI crime lab used tool mark analysis to link the wire cutters to releases at two mink farms.

In September 1998, a federal grand jury indicted Young and Samuel each on four charges of "Extortion by Interfering with Interstate Commerce" and two charges of "Animal Enterprise Terrorism." Samuel was arrested in Belgium on September 4, 1999 and was extradited to the United States to face trial.

== Fugitive life and arrest ==
Young spent the next 7 years as a fugitive. During that time, he lived with a Virginia state ID card under the name “Simon Zimbal” - the name of the Sheboygan fur farmer who reported him to police in 1997. From 2003 to March 2005, Young hid out with a girlfriend in Santa Cruz where the FBI believed he supported himself running a “mail-order CD business."

He was arrested in San Jose, California on March 21, 2005, on charges of shoplifting CDs from a local Starbucks. When searched, he was found with books on “evasion and criminal activity," and “a handcuff key taped to the inside of his belt where his hands would be." A search of his Santa Cruz apartment turned up a VHS tape titled How To Create A New ID, and lock pick devices.

== Conviction and sentencing ==
In August 2005, prosecutors were forced to drop the extortion charges against Young because a Supreme Court ruling had changed the definition of "extortion." In September 2005, Young pleaded guilty to conspiracy to release mink from six fur farms in South Dakota, Wisconsin, and Iowa; and the actual release of 2400 mink from a farm in Medford, Wisconsin. Prosecutors argued that Young had acted on behalf of the Animal Liberation Front, but Young's attorney denied this.

Young was sentenced to two years in federal prison, 360 hours of community service at a charity "to benefit humans and no other species," $254,000 restitution, and one year probation. Before being sentenced, he told the court, addressing fur farmers, that he would "forever mark those nights on your property as the most rewarding experience of my life."

Subsequent to his federal charges, two sets of state charges were filed. Virginia charged Young with "Unlawful Obtaining Of DMV Documents” for obtaining a Virginia State ID card as a fugitive under the name "Simon Zimbal.” South Dakota then filed charges for “Animal Facility Trespass” and “Burglary” related to the 1997 release of 2,400 mink from a farm in Watertown, South Dakota. He served two years on ID charges that ran concurrent to the federal charges.

He was released from Federal Correctional Institution, Victorville, California in 2007.

== Continued law enforcement scrutiny ==
Both after sentencing and release from prison, Young continued to be targeted by law enforcement. In 2010, a federal judge granted an application to confiscate 25% of his wages earned from speaking engagements to put towards $253,000 in restitution owed mink farmers. While incarcerated, the FBI executed search warrants on the homes of activists in an attempt to bring charges of harboring Young while he was a fugitive. No charges were filed.

The FBI made attempts to link Young to additional mink releases, including a 2011 release at a farm in Jewel, Iowa.

In 2019, he was approached by the FBI to make a deal in exchange for providing information on the whereabouts of alleged eco-terrorist fugitive Daniel Andreas San Diego. Young reportedly rejected the offer.

Confidential informants have been used to monitor Young. In 2008, a court document revealed a woman who Young briefly dated in Salt Lake City was working with the FBI.

=== Home raids ===
In March 2010, the FBI served a search warrant on Young's home. It was reported that cell phones, computers and other electronic items were confiscated by the FBI. Court documents revealed the raid was part of the FBI's investigation into Young's alleged involvement in a 2004 Animal Liberation Front raid at the University of Iowa in which 401 animals were taken.

In August 2010, Young's home was raided again by the FBI. The search warrant alleged Young and his roommates had harbored Walter Bond, an individual suspected of setting fire to a leather shop and restaurant. Young denied that Bond stayed at the home.

== Public life since release ==
Since his release, Young has been giving speeches, selling merchandise on Earth Crisis's reunion tour, and helping to release a vegan straight edge hip hop compilation.

Young has also done numerous speaking engagements and continues to be involved in the animal rights movement. He has been a featured speaker at animal rights conferences in the United States and has spoken at animal rights conferences in Europe.

=== Media stunts and appearances ===
In 2013, Exvegans.com, a site publicly shaming former vegans, gained national coverage. Young took responsibility for the anonymous stunt, which redirected visitors to slaughterhouse footage.

In 2014, Young carried out another widely covered media stunt with Jetsetting Terrorist, sharing stories of his confrontations with the TSA as a result of being on their “terrorist” list.

Young has been frequently quoted by the media on stories related to eco-terrorism, including a guest appearance on the Nancy Grace show. He was also the lyrical subject of the song By Conscience Compelled by Earth Crisis, a band he credits for motivating his activism years prior.

=== Film appearances ===
Young had a cameo appearance in the film Bold Native, a film concerned with the topic of animal liberation. Young played the role of "Peter" in the film. Young has also been featured in documentaries, including Skin Trade, Edge - The Movie, and Speciesism: The Movie.

=== Public speaking ===
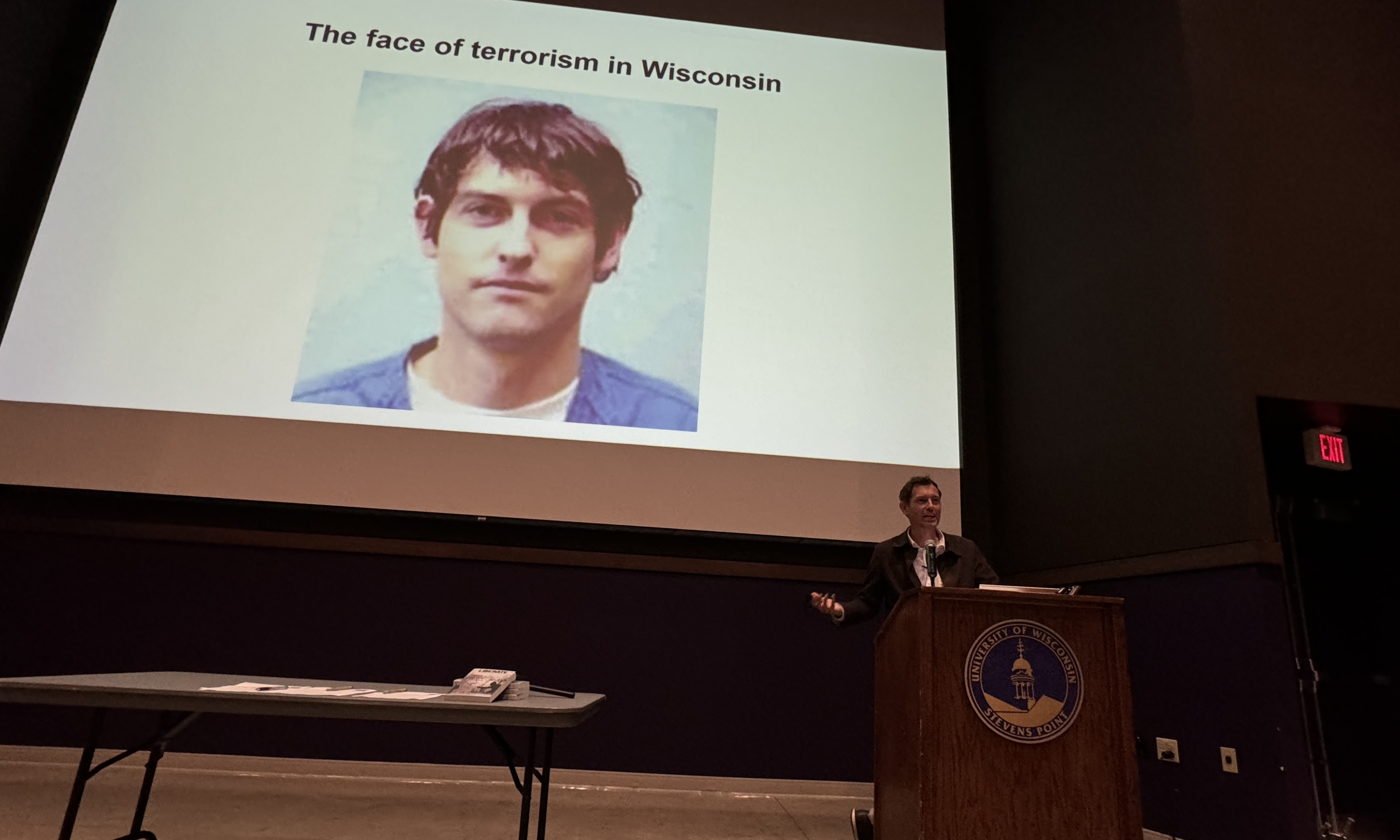
Peter Daniel Young giving a speech at UW-Stevens Point

Since Young's release he has given university lectures on animal liberation, life as a fugitive, and the prison experience. Among others, he has visited Oberlin College, University of Wisconsin, Sarah Lawrence College, and NYU. Critics and law enforcement have accused Young of using his speeches to promote criminal activity, with attempts made to shut some events down.

=== Writing ===
Young launched a publishing imprint called Warcry, publishing titles on the Animal Liberation Front and other fringe political groups. He has published books by Keith Mann, Rod Coronado, and the Animal Liberation Front writing collection, The ALF Strikes Again.

In 2019, Young published a collection of his writings about activism and prison titled Liberate.

== Personal life ==
Young had success as a tech entrepreneur, selling a software business for an amount he said allowed him to “retire at an early age.”

== Writings ==
- Liberate: Animal Liberation Above The Law, Stories And Lessons On The Animal Liberation Front, Animal Rights Activism, & The Animal Liberation Underground (Warcry, 2019) ISBN 978-1732709652
- The Blueprint: Complete Guide to Ending the Fur Industry. (Warcry, 2020) ISBN 978-1732709683
- Animal Liberation Front: Diary Of Actions (Warcry, 2022) ISBN 978-1957452005
- The Jetsetting Terrorist.

== See also ==
- Animal rights and punk subculture
- List of animal rights advocates
