= Gomorrah's Season Ends =

Studio album by Earth Crisis
- Released: October 8, 1996
- Genre: Metalcore
- Length: 37:00
- Label: Victory
- Producers: Steve Feldman and Earth Crisis

Earth Crisis chronology
Destroy the Machines (1995)	Gomorrah's Season Ends (1996)	Breed the Killers (1998)

Professional ratings
Review scores
Source	Rating
Allmusic	3/5 stars

Gomorrah's Season Ends is the second studio album by the American metallic hardcore band Earth Crisis, which was released in 1996.

== Legacy ==
Vocalist Jeremy Bolm of Touché Amoré stated that Gomorrah's Season Ends was one of the albums that changed his life. Code Orange frontman and drummer Jami Morgan named it one of his three favorite albums. Yan Chaussé, drummer for A Perfect Murder, called the title track a "perfect song" and compared it with a "prayer", explaining: "I'm not religious at all... [but] it goes beyond words. It's convictions. The way he sings it... Each member's energy, you feel it ... Everyone puts their heart into it. ... It's more than a song".

== Track listing ==
No.	Title	Length
1.	"Broken Foundation"	4:02
2.	"Cease to Exist"	3:54
3.	"Gomorrah's Season Ends"	3:29
4.	"Constrict"	4:18
5.	"Names Carved into Granite"	7:18
6.	"Situation Degenerates"	2:42
7.	"Morality Dictates"	2:59
8.	"Cling to the Edge"	4:05
9.	"Forgiveness Denied"	4:14
Total length:		37:00

== Credits ==
- Karl Buechner - vocals
- Scott Crouse - lead guitar
- Ian Edwards - bass
- Dennis Merrick - drums
- Kris Wiechmann - rhythm guitar
