= ForeverAtLast =

American rock band

- Origin: Indianapolis, Indiana
- Genres: Punk rock, Post-hardcore, Pop punk, emo
- Years active: 2008-2021
- Label: Victory
- Past members: Brittany Ritchey; Josh Redman; Jared Paris; Austin Puckett

ForeverAtLast is an American rock band from Indianapolis, Indiana. The band's most active lineup was active since 2010 and they were signed to Victory Records. They have been inactive since 2021, after releasing their final single, “Holy Ghost” in 2020.

== Background ==
Foreveratlast was Post-hardcore band that originated in Indianapolis, Indiana. The band consists of Vocalist Brittany Ritchey, Guitarist and Backing Vocalist Jordan Vickers, drummer Jared Paris and bassist and backing vocalist Seth Brown. After many tour dates after the release of 2012's February to February, the band has traveled all over the country and caught the attention of several labels. Going with Victory Records and signing late in 2014, they went to work on Ghosts Again, which was released on October 16, 2015. The band keeps a rigorous tour schedule.

== Members ==
Current

- Brittany Ritchey - Vocals
- Jared Paris - Drums
- Austin Puckett - Bass
- Josh Redman - Guitar

Former

- Michael Goodrich - Bass and vocals
- Jordan Vickers - Guitars
- Seth Brown - Bass and vocals
- Chris Lantz - Guitar and vocals
- Ryan Tennessen - Drums
- Anthony Robison - Bass

== Discography ==
- Welcome To Last Cause Population: Zero (EP) [2009]
- February To February (LP) [June 12, 2012]
- Ghosts Again (LP) [October 16, 2015]
- Holy Ghost (Single) [August 21, 2020]
