= Thieves and Villains =

American indie rock band

- Origin: Hudson Valley, NY
- Genres: Indie pop, indie rock
- Years active: 2007–present
- Labels: Victory
- Members: Sergio "Sergioisdead" Otaegui; Christopher Pennings; Joseph Penna; Chris Competiello
- Website: www.thisisthievesandvillains.com

Thieves and Villains are an American indie rock band from the Hudson Valley region of New York, formed in 2007, and signed to Victory Records.

== History ==
When asked about the meaning of Thieves and Villains's name in an interview the band stated: "People often have to engage in sketchy behavior to get ahead, so we decided that instead of ever allowing ourselves to follow that path we'd name our band 'Thieves and Villains' so that we as people don't have to be." Having met via the local Hudson Valley, New York, music scene in 2005, Sergio Otaegui and Christopher Pennings decided to form the band in early 2007 following the breakups of their previous groups. The band claims to be influenced by "any artist that pushes themselves to exceed their own creative expectations" and are known for their driving indie/alternative/rock sound. After posting their initial demos online on April 1, 2007, the band quickly hit the road to embark on a two-month-long national tour followed by a three-week stint on the 2007 Van's Warped Tour. After more demoing and touring, the band announced their signing to the Chicago, Illinois–based Victory Records in February 2008.

Following their signing to Victory Records in early 2008, the band moved into a lake house in upstate New York to write their full-length debut Movement and spent most of May 2008 recording it with producer Paul Leavitt in Baltimore, Maryland. Movement was released on July 8, 2008, and received positive write-ups in music publications such as Alternative Press, appearances on Fuse TV, music features in popular television shows: Gossip Girl, The Real World, Making the Band, The Bad Girls Club, etc., and the support of organizations like People for the Ethical Treatment of Animals.

The band decided to regroup in mid-2009 with new members, bassist Chris Competiello and drummer Joseph Penna.

Thieves and Villains' second album "South America" was released on August 3, 2010.

== Members ==
=== Current ===
- Sergio Otaegui – lead vocals, guitar
- Christopher Pennings – guitar, vocals, piano
- Chris Competiello – bass
- Joseph Penna – drums

=== Former ===
- Justin Speca – bass
- Rob Delepana – bass
- Johnny Bell – drums
- Jimmi Kane – drums
- John Damiano – drums

== Discography ==
=== Albums ===
- South America (August 3, 2010)
- Movement (July 8, 2008)

=== Singles ===
- Let Go (2008)
- I Have Spread Some Love (Back to Basics) (2008)
- Autobiography (2010)
- Virginia Woolf (2010)

== Interviews ==
- Thieves and Villains - 01.14.09
- NewsOnMusic Blog Interview with Thieves and Villains
- Musiqtone- The Hotseat with Thieves and Villains
- Thieves and Villains!//Out There//Peta2
- E-Minor Music Blog: Interview with Sergio from Thieves and Villains
- Music Buzz - Thieves and Villains 12.4.09
- Bad Guys Playing Music - 04.18.10
