= Die Beste Band der Welt (...und zwar live) =

Video by Die Ärzte
- Released: VHS1: 1988; VHS2: 1989; DVD: 26 September 2008
- Recorded: 26 April 1988
- Venue: "Macht der Nacht" festival (Munich)
- Genre: Punk rock
- Length: VHS1: 55 min VHS2: 46 min DVD: 106 min
- Producer: Die Ärzte

Die Ärzte chronology
Richy Guitar (1985)	Die Beste Band der Welt (...und zwar live) (1988)	Die Beste Band der Welt (...und zwar live) (part 2) (1989)

Die Ärzte chronology
Das ist nicht die ganze Wahrheit... (1988)	Die Beste Band der Welt (...und zwar live) (part 1) (1988)	Live - Nach uns die Sintflut (1988)

"Die Beste Band der Welt (...und zwar live) part 2"

Die Ärzte video chronology
Die Beste Band der Welt (...und zwar live) (part 1) (1988)	Die Beste Band der Welt (...und zwar live) (part 2) (1989)	Gefangen im Schattenreich von Die Ärzte (1996)

Die Ärzte album chronology
Die Ärzte früher! (1989)	Die Beste Band der Welt (...und zwar live) (part 2) (1989)	Die Bestie in Menschengestalt (1993)

Die Ärzte album video chronology
Die Band, die sie Pferd nannten (2004)	Die Beste Band der Welt (...und zwar live) (2008)	Overkiller (2009)

Die Ärzte album chronology
Jazz ist anders (2007)	Die Beste Band der Welt (...und zwar live) (2008)

Die Beste Band der Welt (...und zwar live) (The best band in the world (... live)) are the second and third VHS and the fifth DVD by German rock band Die Ärzte. The DVD is the sampler of the 1988 VHS "Die Beste Band der Welt (...und zwar live) (part 1)" and the 1989 VHS "Die Beste Band der Welt (...und zwar live) (part 2)".

The video features many songs written especially to be played live, such as "Madonnas Dickdarm", "Claudia III" and the instrumental "Der Ritt auf dem Schmetterling". The video is based on the Munich concert from 26 April 1988.

== Track list ==
Die Beste Band der Welt (...und zwar live) (part 1)

1. Ouvertüre zum besten Konzert der Welt [Overture to the best concert in the world] – 1:34
2. Radio brennt [Radio burns] – 2:26
3. Ohne Dich [Without you] – 2:02
4. Blumen [Flowers] – 3:01
5. Buddy Holly's Brille [Buddy Holly's glasses] – 3:48
6. Madonnas Dickdarm [Madonna's colon] – 1:53
7. Alleine in der Nacht [Alone in the night] – 2:31
8. 2000 Mädchen [2,000 girls] – 2:51
9. Mysteryland – 3:24
10. Westerland – 3:41
11. El Cattivo [Bad (in Italian)] – 2:46
12. Außerirdische [Alien] – 2:16
13. Du willst mich küssen [You want to kiss me] – 2:59
14. Ist das alles? [Is that all?] – 3:05
15. Zu spät [Too late] – 3:55
16. Teenager Liebe (in the credits) [Teenager love] – 2:36

Die Beste Band der Welt (...und zwar live) (part 2)

1. Helmut K. [Helmut Kohl] – 2:11
2. Sweet sweet Gwendoline – 2:04
3. Gute Zeit [Have a nice time] – 2:56
4. Elke – 3:53
5. Claudia III – 4:58
6. Der Ritt auf dem Schmetterling [The ride on the butterfly] – 4:05
7. Videoclip: Gehn wie ein Ägypter
8. Videoclip: Westerland
9. Videoclip: Bitte bitte
10. Making of: Bitte bitte
11. Wie am ersten Tag (in the credits) [Like on the first day] – 2:51

Die Beste Band der Welt (...und zwar live) (DVD)

1. Ouvertüre zum besten Konzert der Welt [Overture to the best concert in the world] – 1:34
2. Radio brennt [Radio burns] – 2:26
3. Ohne Dich [Without you] – 2:02
4. Blumen [Flowers] – 3:01
5. Buddy Holly's Brille [Buddy Holly's glasses] – 3:48
6. Madonnas Dickdarm [Madonna's colon] – 1:53
7. Alleine in der Nacht [Alone in the night] – 2:31
8. 2000 Mädchen [2000 girls] – 2:51
9. Mysteryland – 3:24
10. Westerland – 3:41
11. El Cattivo [Bad (in Italian)] – 2:46
12. Außerirdische [Alien] – 2:16
13. Du willst mich küssen [You want to kiss me] – 2:59
14. Ist das alles? [Is that all?] – 3:05
15. Zu spät [Too late] – 3:55
16. Helmut K. [Helmut Kohl] – 2:11
17. Sweet sweet Gwendoline – 2:04
18. Gute Zeit [Have a nice time] – 2:56
19. Elke – 3:53
20. Claudia III – 4:58
21. Der Ritt auf dem Schmetterling [The ride on the butterfly] – 4:05

Bonus videos

1. Video clip: Gehn wie ein Ägypter
2. Video clip: Westerland
3. Video clip: Bitte bitte
4. Making of: Bitte bitte (Nein Danke!) [Please please – No thank you!]

== Song information ==
VHS 1

- Track 16 from the EP Zu schön, um wahr zu sein!
- Track 11,15 from the album Debil
- Track 5,13 from the album Im Schatten der Ärzte
- Track 7,9,14 from the album Die Ärzte
- Track 2,8 from the album Ist das alles? (13 Höhepunkte mit den Ärzten)
- Track 3,4,10,12 from the album Das ist nicht die ganze Wahrheit...

VHS 2

- Track 2 from the album Die Ärzte
- Track 1 from the album Ab 18
- Track 3,4 from the album Das ist nicht die ganze Wahrheit...

New songs

- "Ouvertüre zum besten Konzert der Welt"
- "Madonnas Dickdarm"
- "Claudia III"
- "Der Ritt auf dem Schmetterling"

== Chart performance ==
Chart (2008)	Peak position
German Albums (Offizielle Top 100)	47
Swiss Music DVD (Schweizer Hitparade)	7
