= Die Band, die sie Pferd nannten =

Video by Die Ärzte
- Released: 23 July 2004
- Genre: Punk rock, pop punk
- Length: c. 360 minutes
- Label: Hot Action
- Producer: Die Ärzte

Die Ärzte chronology
| Vollkommen gefangen im Schattenreich von Die Ärzte (2003) | Die Band, die sie Pferd nannten (2004) | Die Beste Band der Welt (...und zwar live) (2008) |

Die Ärzte albums chronology
| Geräusch (2003) | Die Band, die sie Pferd nannten (2004) | Devil (2005) |

Die Band, die sie Pferd nannten (German for "The Band they called Horse") is the fourth DVD by German rock band Die Ärzte. It was released as the DVD to the 2004 tour Jenseits der Grenze des Zumutbaren [Beyond The Border Of Reasonability], that promoted the album Geräusch. The title is a pun on "Ein Mann, den sie Pferd nannten", the German title for: A Man Called Horse

== Track listing ==
DVD 1

1. "Nicht allein" [Not alone]
2. "2000 Mädchen" [2,000 Girls]
3. "Richtig schön evil" [Really quite evil]
4. "Hurra" [Hooray]
5. "Geld" [Money]
6. "Motherfucker 666"
7. "Der Optimist" [The optimist]
8. "Deine Schuld" [Your fault]
9. "T-Error"
10. "Mach die Augen zu" [Close your eyes]
11. "Wie am ersten Tag" [Like on the first day]
12. "Grace Kelly"
13. "Nichts in der Welt" [Nothing in the world]
14. "Anti-Zombie"
15. "Geisterhaus" [Ghost house]
16. "Alleine in der Nacht" [Alone in the night]
17. "Die klügsten Männer der Welt" [The wisest men in the world]
18. "Opfer" [Victim]
19. "WAMMW" [Wenn alle Männer Mädchen wären - If all men were women]
20. "Yoko Ono"
21. "Bravopunks"
22. "Rock-Rendezvous"
23. "Ein Sommer nur für mich" [A summer just for me]
24. "Die Nacht" [The night]
25. "Kopfüber in die Hölle" [Headfirst into hell]
26. "Wie es geht" [How it's done]

Bonus

1. "Teenager Liebe" [Teenager love]
2. "Du willst mich küssen" [You want to kiss me]
3. "Rebell" [Rebel]

DVD 2

1. "Dinge von denen" [Things of which]
2. "Unrockbar" [Unrockable]
3. "Meine Ex(plodierte Freundin)" [My ex(ploded) girlfriend)]
4. "Schrei nach Liebe" [Cry for love]
5. "Langweilig" [Boring]
6. Medley:
  - "Ohne dich" [Without you]
  - "Paul"
  - "Quark" [Rubbish, lit. Curd]
  - "Schunder-Song"
  - "Meine Freunde" [My friends]
  - "Nie wieder Krieg, nie wieder Las Vegas!" [No more war, no more Las Vegas!]
  - "Rettet die Wale" [Save the whales]
  - "Der lustige Astronaut" [The merry astronaut]
  - "Las Vegas"
7. "Monsterparty"
8. "FaFaFa" (feat. Fettes Brot)
9. "Ist das alles?" [Is that all?]
10. "Manchmal haben Frauen..." [Sometimes, women have...]
11. "Westerland"
12. "Zu spät" [Too late]

Bonus

1. "Komm zurück" [Come back]
2. "Gib mir Zeit" [Give me time]
3. "Angeber" [Show-off]

== Song information ==
DVD 1

- Track 12 from the EP Zu schön, um wahr zu sein!
- Tracks 11, 16 from the album Die Ärzte
- Track 2 from the album Ist das alles? (13 Höhepunkte mit den Ärzten)
- Track 10, 25 from the album Die Bestie in Menschengestalt
- Tracks 4, 18 from the album Planet Punk
- Track 6 from the album Le Frisur
- Track 21 from the album 5, 6, 7, 8 – Bullenstaat!
- Tracks 5, 7, 20, 22, 23, 26 from the album Runter mit den Spendierhosen, Unsichtbarer!
- Tracks 1, 3, 8, 9, 13, 14, 15, 17, 24 from the album Geräusch
- Track 19 is a B-side of the single "Nichts in der Welt"

Bonus

- Track 1 from the EP Zu schön, um wahr zu sein!
- Track 3 from the album 13
- Track 2 from the album Runter mit den Spendierhosen, Unsichtbarer!

DVD 2

- Track 6–8 from the EP Uns geht's prima...
- Tracks 6–2, 12 from the album Debil
- Track 9 from the album Die Ärzte
- Tracks 6–1, 11 from the album Das ist nicht die ganze Wahrheit...
- Tracks 4, 6–3, 8 from the album Die Bestie in Menschengestalt
- Tracks 3, 5, 6–4 from the album Planet Punk
- Tracks 6–5, 6–6 from the album 13
- Tracks 6–9, 10 from the album Runter mit den Spendierhosen, Unsichtbarer!
- Track 6–7 from the B-side from Manchmal haben Frauen...
- Tracks 6, 7 from the album Rock'n'Roll Realschule
- Tracks 1, 2 from the album Geräusch

Bonus

- Track 1 from the album Das ist nicht die ganze Wahrheit...
- Track 3 from the album 13
- Track 2 from the album Runter mit den Spendierhosen, Unsichtbarer!

=== Certifications ===
| Region | Certification | Certified units/sales |
|---|---|---|
| Germany (BVMI) | 3× Platinum | 150,000^{^} |
^{^} Shipments figures based on certification alone.

Jenseits der Grenze des Zumutbaren
- Tour by Die Ärzte
- Associated album: Geräusch
- Start date: 9 December 2003
- End date: 23 December 2003
- No. of shows: 11

Die Ärzte concert chronology
- Festivals 2003 (2003); Jenseits der Grenze des Zumutbaren (2003); Unrockstar (2004)

== Jenseits der Grenze des Zumutbaren ==
The Jenseits der Grenze des Zumutbaren ("Behind the border of reasonability") was the 36th concert tour by German rock band Die Ärzte. The tour supported their tenth studio album, Geräusch (2003).

== Tour dates ==
| Date | City | Venue | |
|---|---|---|---|
| 9 December 2003 | Regensburg | Donau Arena | |
| 10 December 2003 | Zürich | Hallenstadion | |
| 12 December 2003 | Chemnitz | Chemnitz Arena | |
| 13 December 2003 | Oberhausen | König Pilsener Arena | DVD 1 |
| 14 December 2003 | Oberhausen | König Pilsener Arena | DVD 2 |
| 16 December 2003 | Braunschweig | Volkswagen Halle | |
| 17 December 2003 | Bremen | AWD-Dome "Halle 7" | |
| 19 December 2003 | Hamburg | Color Line Arena | |
| 20 December 2003 | Frankfurt | Festhalle Frankfurt | |
| 21 December 2003 | Stuttgart | Hanns-Martin-Schleyer-Halle | |
| 23 December 2003 | Wien | Bank Austria Halle | |

== See also ==
- Die Ärzte – Hören, sehen, sagen... nicht! – Die Lesetour (2001)
- Jazzfäst (2008)
