= Satanische Pferde =

Live album by Die Ärzte
- Released: 1999
- Recorded: 1999
- Genre: Punk rock
- Label: Hot Action Records
- Producer: Uwe Hoffmann and Die Ärzte

Die Ärzte chronology
Wir wollen nur deine Seele (1999)	Satanische Pferde (1999)	Runter mit den Spendierhosen, Unsichtbarer! (2000)

Satanische Pferde ("Satanic horses") is the third live album by German rock band Die Ärzte and featured leftover songs from Wir wollen nur deine Seele. It was only available to the fan club members. The name is a pun on The Satanic Verses ("Satanische Verse").

A download single, "Zu spät (live)", was available on 24 December 1999, as a teaser for the album.

== Track listing ==
1. "Radio brennt" (Radio burns) - 2:46
2. "Außerirdische" (Aliens) - 2:23
3. "Ohne Dich" (Without you) - 2:16
4. "Alleine in der Nacht" (Alone at night) - 2:39
5. "Sweet sweet Gwendoline" - 2:31
6. "Madonnas Dickdarm" (Madonna's colon) - 2:11
7. "Helmut K." - 2:27
8. "Buddy Holly's Brille" (Buddy Holly's glasses) - 4:08
9. "Ich ess Blumen" (I eat flowers) - 3:33
10. "Mysteryland" - 3:34
11. "2000 Mädchen" (2,000 girls) - 4:51
12. "Du willst mich küssen" (You want to kiss me) - 3:59
13. "Wie am ersten Tag" (Like on the first day) - 3:03
14. "Dos corazones" (Two hearts [in Spanish]) - 3:25
15. "Popstar" - 3:07
16. "Frank'nstein" - 2:27
17. "Sie kratzt" (She scratches) - 2:36
18. "Vollmilch" (Whole milk) - 3:20
19. "Ist das alles?" (Is that all?) - 3:40
20. "Zu spät" (Too late) - 4:32
21. "♀" - 8:34

=== Song information ===
- Tracks 16, 20 from Debil
- Tracks 8, 12 from Im Schatten der Ärzte
- Tracks 4, 5, 10, 13, 19 from Die Ärzte
- Tracks 1, 11 from Ist das alles? (13 Höhepunkte mit den Ärzten)
- Tracks 7, 17 from Ab 18
- Tracks 2, 3, 9, 15, 21 from Das ist nicht die ganze Wahrheit...
- Track 6 from Live – Nach uns die Sintflut
- Track 18 from Die Ärzte früher!
- Track 14 from Die Bestie in Menschengestalt

== Personnel ==
- Farin Urlaub - guitar, vocals
- Bela Felsenheimer - drums, vocals
- Rodrigo González - bass guitar, vocals
