= Die Ärzte discography =

German rock band discography

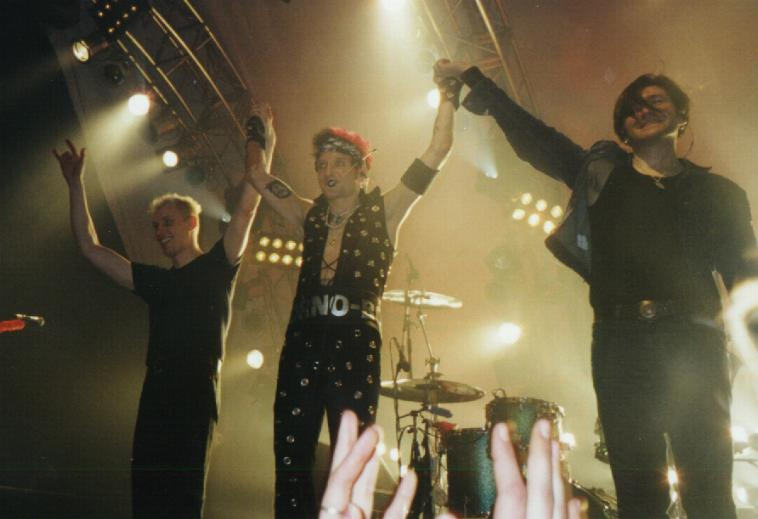
- Die Ärzte during a concert in Cologne (1998)
- Studio albums: 14
- Extended plays: 7
- Live albums: 6
- Compilation albums: 8
- Singles: 50
- Video albums: 11
- Music videos: 34

German rock band Die Ärzte have released 14 studio albums, eight extended plays, seven compilation albums, six live albums, 11 video albums and 50 singles (of which the majority is accompanied by a music video). The band—consisting of members Farin Urlaub, Bela B and Rodrigo González—is one of the best-selling German groups with 7.8 million records sold in Germany.

Their work include German language songs such as "Schrei nach Liebe" (1993), "Ein Song namens Schunder" (1995), "Männer sind Schweine" (1998) and "Manchmal haben Frauen..." (2000), which experienced commercial success in majority German speaking countries. Die Ärzte's albums, released by labels including CBS and Hot Action Records, received several Gold and Platinum certifications by the Bundesverband Musikindustrie (BVMI) in Germany and the International Federation of the Phonographic Industry (IFPI) in Austria and Switzerland in a span of almost 30 years.

== Albums ==
=== Studio albums ===
List of studio albums, with selected chart positions and certifications
Title	Album details	Peak chart positions			Certifications
Title	Album details	GER	AUT	SWI	Certifications
Debil	Released: 1984; Label: Columbia; Format: CD	5 (Note: Peak position for its 2005 reissue, Devil.)	22	77	BVMI: Gold
Im Schatten der Ärzte	Released: 1985; Label: CBS; Format: CD	53	—	—	BVMI: Gold
Die Ärzte	Released: 1986; Label: CBS; Format: CD	7	—	—	
Das ist nicht die ganze Wahrheit...	Released: 19 April 1988; Label: CBS; Format: CD	6	13	—	BVMI: Gold
Die Bestie in Menschengestalt	Released: 5 October 1993; Label: Metronome, Vivendi; Format: CD	2	1	8	BVMI: 3× Gold; IFPI AUT: Platinum; IFPI SWI: Gold
Planet Punk	Released: 18 September 1995; Label: Metronome; Format: CD	2	3	4	BVMI: Platinum; IFPI AUT: Gold; IFPI SWI: Gold
Le Frisur	Released: 24 May 1996; Label: Metronome, Universal; Format: CD	3	6	8	
13	Released: 25 May 1998; Label: Hot Action; Format: CD	1	2	1	BVMI: Platinum; IFPI AUT: Gold; IFPI SWI: Gold
Runter mit den Spendierhosen, Unsichtbarer!	Released: 20 October 2000; Label: Hot Action; Format: CD	1	3	11	BVMI: Platinum
Geräusch	Released: 29 September 2003; Label: Hot Action; Format: CD, digital download	1	2	7	BVMI: 2× Gold; IFPI AUT: Gold
Jazz ist anders	Released: 2 November 2007; Label: Hot Action; Format: CD, digital download	1	2	2	BVMI: 4× Platinum; IFPI AUT: Platinum; IFPI SWI: Gold
auch	Released: 13 April 2012; Label: Hot Action; Format: CD, digital download	1	1	1	BVMI: Platinum; IFPI AUT: Gold
Hell	Released: 23 October 2020; Label: Hot Action; Format: CD, digital download	1	2	2	
Dunkel	Released: 24 September 2021; Label: Hot Action; Format: CD, digital download	1	1	1	
"—" denotes a release that did not chart or was not released in that territory.

=== Extended plays ===
List of extended plays
Title	Album details
Zu schön, um wahr zu sein!	Released: 1983; Label: Vielklang, Schnick-Schnack; Format: CD
Uns geht's prima...	Released: 1984; Label: Vielklang; Format: CD
Original Ärztesoundtrack zum Film "Richy Guitar"	Released: 1985; Label: CBS; Format: CD
Die Ärzte	Released: 1989; Label: Amiga; Format: CD
1, 2, 3, 4, – Bullenstaat!	Released: 1995; Label: Eldo; Format: CD
Rockgiganten vs. Strassenköter	Released: 22 November 1996; Label: Metronome, Gringo; Format: CD
Jazz ist anders Bonus EP	Released: 2 November 2007; Label: Hot Action; Format: CD

=== Compilation albums ===
List of compilation albums, with selected chart positions and certifications
Title	Album details	Peak chart positions			Certifications
Title	Album details	GER	AUT	SWI	Certifications
Ist das alles? (13 Höhepunkte mit den Ärzten)	Released: 1987; Label: CBS; Format: CD	22	—	—	BVMI: Gold
Ab 18	Released: 21 October 1987; Label: CBS; Format: CD	33	—	—	
Die Ärzte früher!	Released: 13 February 1989; Label: Vielklang; Format: CD	4	12	—	BVMI: Gold
Das Beste von kurz nach früher bis jetze	Released: 26 August 1994; Label: Columbia; Format: CD	6	—	22	BVMI: Platinum; IFPI AUT: Gold
Die Ärzte	Released: 2001; Label: Howling Bull; Format: CD, digital download	—	—	—	
Bäst of	Released: 6 October 2006; Label: Hot Action; Format: CD	1	1	4	BVMI: Platinum; IFPI SWI: Gold
Seitenhirsch	Released: 14 December 2018; Label: And More Bears; Format: CD, digital download	10	—	—	
They've Given Me Schrott! – Die Outtakes	Released: 8 February 2019; Label: And More Bears; Format: CD, digital download	2	10	15	
"—" denotes a release that did not chart or was not released in that territory.

=== Live albums ===
List of live albums, with selected chart positions and certifications
Title	Album details	Peak chart positions			Certifications
Title	Album details	GER	AUT	SWI	Certifications
Live – Nach uns die Sintflut	Released: 27 October 1988; Label: CBS; Format: CD	1	9	17	BVMI: Platinum; IFPI AUT: Gold
Wir wollen nur deine Seele	Released: 22 November 1999; Label: Hot Action; Format: CD	4	16	9	BVMI: Gold
Satanische Pferde	Released: 1999; Label: Hot Action; Format: CD	—	—	—	
Unplugged – Rock'n'Roll Realschule	Released: 4 November 2002; Label: Hot Action; Format: CD, digital download	2	5	20	BVMI: Platinum; IFPI AUT: Gold
Jazzfäst	Released: 2009; Label: Hot Action; Format: CD, digital download	—	—	—	
Die Nacht der Dämonen	Released: 13 September 2013; Label: Hot Action; Format: CD, digital download	1	16	11	
"—" denotes a release that did not chart or was not released in that territory.

=== Other albums ===
List of fellow albums
Title	Album details
GötterDÄmmerung	Released: October 1997; Label: Gringo, Intercod; Format: CD
5, 6, 7, 8 – Bullenstaat!	Released: 7 March 2001; Label: Hot Action; Format: CD, digital download
Männer haben kein Gehirn	Released: October 2001; Label: Hot Action; Format: CD, digital download
Jazz ist anders (Economy)	Released: 14 November 2007; Label: Hot Action; Format: CD, digital download
Live in Linz 3 July 2009	Released: 3 July 2009; Label: Independent; Format: USB
Live in Linz 4 July 2009	Released: 4 July 2009; Label: Independent; Format: USB

== Singles ==
=== As lead artist ===
List of singles, with selected chart positions and certifications
Title	Year	Peak chart positions			Certifications	Album
Title	Year	GER	AUT	SWI	Certifications	Album
"Paul"	1984	—	—	—		Debil
"Zu spät"	1985	—	—	—		Debil
"Wegen dir"	1985	—	—	—		Im Schatten der Ärzte
"Du willst mich küssen"	1986	—	—	—		Im Schatten der Ärzte
"Für immer"	1986	—	—	—		Die Ärzte
"Ist das alles?"	1986	—	—	—		Die Ärzte
"Gehn wie ein Ägypter"	1987	44	—	—		Ist das alles? (13 Höhepunkte mit den Ärzten)
"2000 Mädchen"	1987	—	—	—		Ist das alles? (13 Höhepunkte mit den Ärzten)
"Radio brennt"	1987	50	—	—		Ist das alles? (13 Höhepunkte mit den Ärzten)
"Ich ess' Blumen"	1988	—	—	—		Das ist nicht die ganze Wahrheit...
"Westerland"	1988	34	—	—	BVMI: Gold	Das ist nicht die ganze Wahrheit...
"Der Ritt auf dem Schmetterling (Instrumental)"	1988	—	—	—		Live – Nach uns die Sintflut
"Live – Zu spät..."	1988	25	—	—		Live – Nach uns die Sintflut
"Teenager Liebe (unecht)/Gute Nacht"	1989	—	—	—		Die Ärzte früher!
"Bitte bitte"	1989	18	—	—		Das ist nicht die ganze Wahrheit...
"Schrei nach Liebe"	1993	1	1	6	BVMI: Gold	Die Bestie in Menschengestalt
"Mach die Augen zu"	1993	31	9	—		Die Bestie in Menschengestalt
"Friedenspanzer"	1994	32	—	—		Die Bestie in Menschengestalt
"Quark"	1994	37	—	—		Die Bestie in Menschengestalt
"Ein Song namens Schunder"	1995	4	18	11	BVMI: Gold	Planet Punk
"Hurra"	1995	25	—	49		Planet Punk
"Rod Loves You"	1995	—	—	—		Planet Punk
"3-Tage-Bart"	1996	30	—	24		Le Frisur
"Mein Baby war beim Frisör"	1996	43	—	—		Le Frisur
"Ein Schwein namens Männer"	1998	1	1	1	BVMI: 2× Platinum; IFPI AUT: Gold; IFPI SWI: Gold	13
"Goldenes Handwerk"	1998	36	—	—		13
"1/2 Lovesong"	1998	28	—	—		13
"Rebell"	1999	42	—	—		13
"Die Schönen und das Biest: Elke (live)"	1999	28	—	—		Wir wollen nur deine Seele
"Wie es geht"	2000	5	12	36		Runter mit den Spendierhosen, Unsichtbarer!
"Manchmal haben Frauen..."	2000	4	62	94	BVMI: Gold	Runter mit den Spendierhosen, Unsichtbarer!
"Yoko Ono"	2001	46	65	—		Runter mit den Spendierhosen, Unsichtbarer!
"Rock'n'Roll-Übermensch"	2001	50	—	—		Runter mit den Spendierhosen, Unsichtbarer!
"Komm zurück/Die Banane"	2002	34	—	—		Unplugged – Rock'n'Roll Realschule
"Unrockbar"	2003	1	9	27		Geräusch
"Dinge von denen"	2003	14	33	68		Geräusch
"Nichts in der Welt"	2004	13	29	52		Geräusch
"Deine Schuld"	2004	15	34	62		Geräusch
"Die klügsten Männer der Welt"	2004	23	33	50		Geräusch
"Junge"	2007	1	7	23		Jazz ist anders
"Lied vom Scheitern"	2008	7	23	—		Jazz ist anders
"Lasse redn"	2008	6	3	79		Jazz ist anders
"HimmelblauPerfektBreit"	2009	26	—	—		Jazz ist anders
"ZeiDverschwÄndung"	2012	3	20	63		auch
"M + F"	2012	13	18	—		auch
"Ist das noch Punkrock?"	2012	18	—	—		auch
"Waldspaziergang mit Folgen / Sohn der Leere"	2013	17	61	—		auch
"Morgens pauken"	2020	3	—	86		Hell
"True Romance"	2020	1	—	—		Hell
"Ich, am Strand"	2021	4	—	—		Hell
"—" denotes a recording that did not chart or was not released in that territory.

== Videography ==
=== Video albums ===
List of video albums, with selected chart positions and certifications
Title	Album details	Peak chart positions			Certifications
Title	Album details	GER	AUT	SWI	Certifications
Richy Guitar	Released: 1984; Format: VHS, DVD, Blu-ray	—	—	—	
Die Beste Band der Welt (...und zwar live)	Released: 1988; Label: CBS; Format: VHS, DVD	47	—	—	
Die Beste Band der Welt (...und zwar live) II	Released: 1989; Label: CBS; Format: VHS	4	12	—	
Gefangen im Schattenreich von Die Ärzte	Released: 1996; Label: Metronome; Format: VHS, DVD	—	—	—	BVMI: Gold
Noch mehr gefangen im Schattenreich von Die Ärzte	Released: 1996; Label: Metronome; Format: VHS, DVD	—	—	—	BVMI: Gold
Killer	Released: 2000; Label: Hot Action; Format: VHS, DVD	—	—	—	BVMI: Platinum
Üben, Unsichtbarer!	Released: 2001; Format: Digital download	—	—	—	
Unplugged – Rock'n'Roll Realschule	Released: 2002; Label: Hot Action; Format: VHS, DVD	—	—	—	BVMI: Platinum
Die Band, die sie Pferd nannten	Released: 2004; Label: Hot Action; Format: DVD	1	—	16	BVMI: 3× Platinum; IFPI AUT: Gold; IFPI SWI: Gold
Overkiller	Released: 2009; Label: Hot Action; Format: DVD	2	2	—	
Die Nacht der Dämonen	Released: 2013; Label: Hot Action; Format: DVD	—	—	—	
"—" denotes a release that did not chart or was not released in that territory.

=== Music videos ===
List of music videos, with notes and directors
Title	Year	Director(s)
"Gehn wie ein Ägypter"	1987	Unknown
"Westerland"	1988	Unknown
"Bitte bitte"	1989	Reinhard Günzler / Peter Clausen
"Schrei nach Liebe"	1993	Detlev Buck
"Mach die Augen zu"	1993	Detlev Buck
"Friendenspanzer"	1994	Kai Sehr
"Quark"	1994	Kai Sehr
"Ein Song namens Schunder"	1995	Kai Sehr
"Hurra"	1995	Kai Sehr
"Rod Loves You"	1995	Kai Sehr
"3-Tage-Bart"	1996	Kai Sehr
"Mein Baby war beim Frisör"	1996	Kai Sehr
"Ein Schwein namens Männer"	1998	Kai Sehr
"Goldenes Handwerk"	1998	Kai Sehr
"1/2 Lovesong"	1998	Olaf Heine
"Rebell"	1999	Olaf Heine
"Die Schönen und das Biest: Elke (live)"	1999	Schwarwel
"Wie es geht"	2000	Norbert Heiker
"Manchmal haben Frauen..."	2000	Olaf Heine
"Yoko Ono"	2001	Sven Bollinger
"Rock'n'Roll-Übermensch"	2001	Philipp Stölzl
"Unrockbar"	2003	Norbert Heiker
"Dinge von denen"	2003	Norbert Heiker
"Nichts in der Welt"	2004	Norbert Heiker
"Deine Schuld"	2004	Sven Bollinger
"Die klügsten Männer der Welt"	2004	Norbert Heiker
"Junge"	2007	Norbert Heiker
"Lied vom Scheitern"	2008	Norbert Heiker
"Lasse redn"	2008	Norbert Heiker
"HimmelblauPerfektBreit"	2008	Norbert Heiker
"ZeiDverschwÄndung"	2012	Yehontan Richer-Levin / Thomas Bausenwein
"M + F"	2012	Florian Sänger
"Ist das noch Punkrock?"	2012	Yehontan Richer-Levin / Thomas Bausenwein
"Waldspaziergang mit Folgen"	2013	Yehontan Richer-Levin / Thomas Bausenwein
