= Das Beste von kurz nach früher bis jetze =

Compilation album by Die Ärzte
- Released: 26 August 1994
- Genre: Punk rock
- Length: CD 1: 70:08; CD 2: 68:59
- Label: Columbia Records
- Producer: Various

Die Ärzte chronology
Die Bestie in Menschengestalt (1993)	Das Beste von kurz nach früher bis jetze (1994)	Planet Punk (1995)

Das Beste von kurz nach früher bis jetze (The best from shortly after earlier until now) is a compilation album released by German rock band Die Ärzte on 26 August 1994. It consists of previously released studio, single, remix and live versions of Die Ärzte songs, along with four remixes originally created for this album.

The title refers to the title of Die Ärzte früher! (Die Ärzte earlier!), which was a compilation of songs pre-1984. This means, that Das Beste von kurz nach früher bis jetze is a compilation of songs from 1984-1994.

The booklet features commentaries by Bela and Farin. Rod had joined the band at the time, but with Rod, Die Ärzte had released only one album at the time and on this album there are three songs from that album (Die Bestie in Menschengestalt).

== Track listing ==
CD 1
No.	Title	Writer(s)	Length
1.	"Quark" (Rubbish, lit. Curd; from Die Bestie in Menschengestalt/Remix '94)	M/T: Urlaub	2:43
2.	"Grace Kelly" (from Original Ärztesoundtrack zum Film "Richy Guitar")	M/T: Urlaub	2:17
3.	"Zu spät" (Too late; from Debil)	M/T: Urlaub	2:43
4.	"Mr. Sexpistols" (from Debil)	M/T: Felsenheimer	3:13
5.	"Käfer" (Beetle; from Im Schatten der Ärzte)	M/T: Urlaub	2:53
6.	"Radio brennt" (Radio burns; from "Radio brennt (Dingleberry-Mix)"/Maxi-Version)	M/T: Urlaub	6:56
7.	"Ich bin reich" (I am rich; from Die Ärzte)	M/T: Urlaub	4:22
8.	"Madonnas Dickdarm" (Madonna's colon; from Live - Nach uns die Sintflut)	M/T: Felsenheimer-Urlaub-Liebing	2:11
9.	"Ist das alles?" (Is that all?; from Die Ärzte/Remix '94)	M/T: Felsenheimer	4:38
10.	"Ohne dich" (Without you; from Das ist nicht die ganze Wahrheit...)	M/T: Urlaub	2:43
11.	"Gabi gibt 'ne Party" (Gabi throws a party; for the magazine "Moskito")	M/T: Felsenheimer-Urlaub	3:08
12.	"Und ich weine" (And I cry; from "Wegen dir")	M/T: Urlaub	3:02
13.	"Du willst mich küssen" (You want to kiss me; from "Du willst mich küssen"/Maxi Version)	M/T: Urlaub	4:49
14.	"Ewige Blumenkraft" (Eternal flower power; from "Für immer")	M/T: Felsenheimer-Urlaub	3:19
15.	"Ich ess Blumen" (I eat flowers; from Live - Nach uns die Sintflut)	M/T: Felsenheimer	3:08
16.	"Das ist Rock'n'Roll" (That's rock'n'roll; for the magazine "Moskito")	M/T: Felsenheimer-Urlaub	3:02
17.	"2000 Mädchen" (2000 girls; from "2000 Mädchen"/Maxi Version)	M/T: Felsenheimer-Urlaub	5:49
18.	"Zum letzten Mal" (For the last time; from Die Ärzte/Remix '94)	M/T: Urlaub	4:26
19.	"Friedenspanzer" (Peace tank; from "Friedenspanzer")	M/T: Gonzales-Felsenheimer	3:55

CD 2
No.	Title	Writer(s)	Length
1.	"Wie am ersten Tag" (Like on the first day; from Die Ärzte/Remix '94)	M/T: Urlaub	3:42
2.	"Alleine in der Nacht" (Alone in the night; from Die Ärzte)	M/T: Felsenheimer	2:46
3.	"Bitte bitte" (Please please; from "Bitte bitte"/Maxi Version)	M/T: Urlaub	7:33
4.	"Wegen dir" (Because of you; from "Wegen dir"/Zeltlagermix)	M/T: Urlaub	3:06
5.	"Elke" (from Live - Nach uns die Sintflut)	M/T: Urlaub	3:58
6.	"Westerland (to the Max)" (from "Westerland"/Maxi Version)	M/T: Felsenheimer-Urlaub	9:52
7.	"Ausserirdische" (Aliens; from Das ist nicht die ganze Wahrheit...)	M/T: Urlaub	2:39
8.	"Claudia III" (from Live - Nach uns die Sintflut)	M/T: Felsenheimer-Urlaub-Liebing	3:38
9.	"Gwendoline" (from Die Ärzte)	M/T: Urlaub	2:49
10.	"Gabi & Uwe in: Liebe und Frieden" (Love and peace; for the magazine "Moskito")	M/T: Felsenheimer-Urlaub	3:22
11.	"Baby ich tu's" (Baby I'll do it; from Das ist nicht die ganze Wahrheit...)	M/T: Felsenheimer	3:06
12.	"♀" (from Live - Nach uns die Sintflut)	M/T: Urlaub	10:16
13.	"Gute Zeit" (Good time; from Das ist nicht die ganze Wahrheit.../Remix '94)	M/T: Felsenheimer	3:31
14.	"Ich weiss nicht, ob es Liebe ist..." (I don't know, whether it's love...; from Im Schatten der Ärzte)	M/T: Urlaub	3:47
15.	"Schrei nach Liebe" (Cry for love; from Die Bestie in Menschengestalt)	M/T: Urlaub	4:12

== Personnel ==
- Farin Urlaub - guitar, vocals
- Bela Felsenheimer - drums, vocals
- Rodrigo González - bass, vocals
- Hans Runge - bass
- Hagen Liebing - bass

=== Producers ===
- Uwe Hoffmann and Die Ärzte: 1, 6, 8, 10, 15, 17, 19 from CD 1; 3, 5-8, 11-13, 15 from CD 2
- Die Ärzte: 2-4, 11, 12, 16 from CD 1; 10 from CD 2
- Micky Meuser: 5, 13 from CD 1; 4, 14 from CD 2
- Manne Praeker: 7, 9 (original), 14, 18 (original) from CD 1; 1 (original), 2, 9 from CD 2
- Uwe Hoffmann: 9 (remix), 18 (remix) from CD 1; 1 (remix) from CD 2

== Charts ==
=== Weekly charts ===
Chart (1994)	Peak position
German Albums (Offizielle Top 100)	6
Swiss Albums (Schweizer Hitparade)	22

=== Year-end charts ===
Chart (1994)	Position
German Albums (Offizielle Top 100)	77
