= Gefangen im Schattenreich von Die Ärzte =

Gefangen im Schattenreich von Die Ärzte (part 1)

Video by Die Ärzte
- Released: VHS 1: 28 May 1996; VHS 2: 3 September 1996; DVD: 19 May 2003
- Recorded: 1993–1996
- Genre: Punk rock
- Length: VHS 1: 107 min VHS 2: 103 min DVD: 213 min
- Producer: Die Ärzte

Die Ärzte chronology
Die Beste Band der Welt (...und zwar live) II (1989)	Gefangen im Schattenreich von Die Ärzte (part 1) (1996)	Noch mehr Gefangen im Schattenreich von Die Ärzte (1996)

Die Ärzte album chronology
Le Frisur (1996)	Gefangen im Schattenreich von Die Ärzte (1996)	Rockgiganten vs. Strassenköter (1997)

Noch mehr Gefangen im Schattenreich von Die Ärzte (part 2)

Die Ärzte video chronology
Gefangen im Schattenreich von Die Ärzte (1996)	Noch mehr Gefangen im Schattenreich von Die Ärzte (1996)	Killer (1999/2000)

Die Ärzte album chronology
Le Frisur (1996)	Noch mehr Gefangen im Schattenreich von Die Ärzte (1996)	Rockgiganten vs. Strassenköter (1997)

Vollkommen Gefangen im Schattenreich von Die Ärzte

Die Ärzte video chronology
Rock'n'Roll Realschule (2002)	Vollkommen Gefangen im Schattenreich von Die Ärzte (2003)	Die Band, die sie Pferd nannten (2004)

Die Ärzte album chronology
Unplugged - Rock'n'Roll Realschule (1996)	Vollkommen Gefangen im Schattenreich von Die Ärzte (2003)	Geräusch (1997)

Gefangen im Schattenreich von Die Ärzte ("Imprisoned in the netherworld of Die Ärzte") is the third VHS by German rock band Die Ärzte. It features live and backstage videos. It is the first part of the tour videos from 1993 to 1996.

== Track listing ==
1. "Super Drei" (Super three)
2. "Geh mit mir" (Date me lit. Go with me)
3. "FaFaFa"
4. "Friedenspanzer" (Peace tank)
5. "Der Misanthrop" (The misanthrope)
6. "Teddybär" (Teddy bear)
7. "2000 Mädchen" (2,000 girls)
8. "Vermissen, Baby" (Missing, baby)
9. "Omaboy" (Grandma boy)
10. "Schunder-Song"
11. "Ich bin reich" (I'm rich)
12. "Anneliese Schmidt"
13. "Westerland"
14. "Revolution"
15. "Ist das alles?" (Is that all?)
16. Video clip: "Hurra" (Hooray!)
17. "Making of: Quark"

== Noch mehr gefangen im Schattenreich von Die Ärzte ==
Noch mehr gefangen im Schattenreich von Die Ärzte ("Even more imprisoned in the netherworld of Die Ärzte") is the fourth VHS by the German rock band Die Ärzte. It features the second part of the tour videos from 1993 to 1996.

== Track listing ==
1. "Making of: Planet Punk"
2. "Zum Bäcker" (To the baker)
3. "Mysteryland"
4. "Making of: 3-Tage-Bart" (Designer stubble; lit: 3-days-beard)
5. "Trick 17 m.S"
6. "Elke"
7. "Die Banane" (The banana)
8. "Frank'n'Stein"
9. "Westerland"
10. "Paul"
11. "BGS" (Bundesgrenzschutz - Federal Border Guard)
12. "Making of: Hurra" (Hooray!)
13. "Die traurige Ballade von Susi Spakowski"
14. "Die Allerschürfste" (The Superhottest)
15. "Tour-Charts - Was Die Ärzte so hinter der Bühne singen…" (Tour charts - What Die Ärzte sing backstage)
16. "Alleine in der Nacht" (Alone at night)
17. "Sweet Sweet Gwendoline"
18. "Making of: Schunder-Song"
19. "Schopenhauer"
20. "Punk Rock - Die Ärzte als Gesangstrio, das alte deutsche Lieder vorträgt" (Punk Rock - Die Ärzte as a singing-trio, singing old German songs)
21. "B.S.L." (Brutaler, schneller Lärm - Brutal, rapid noise)
22. "Wie am ersten Tag" (Like the first day)
23. "Blumen" (Flowers)
24. "Erna P."
25. "Vollmilch" (Whole milk)
26. "Schrei nach Liebe" (Cry for love)
27. "Rod Loves You"

== Vollkommen gefangen im Schattenreich von Die Ärzte ==
Vollkommen gefangen im Schattenreich von Die Ärzte ("Completely imprisoned in the netherworld of Die Ärzte") is the third DVD by German rock band Die Ärzte. It is a DVD sampler of the tour videos from 1993 to 1996.

== Song information ==
VHS 1

- Track 6, 12 from the EP Zu schön, um wahr zu sein!
- Track 11 from the album Die Ärzte
- Track 7 from the album Ist das alles? (13 Höhepunkte mit den Ärzten)
- Track 13 from the album Das ist nicht die ganze Wahrheit...
- Track 3, 4, 9, 14 from the album Die Bestie in Menschengestalt
- Track 1, 2, 5, 8, 10 from the album Planet Punk

VHS 2

- Track 24 from the single "Paul"
- Track 8, 10 from the album Debil
- Track 3, 16, 17 from the album Die Ärzte
- Track 6, 9, 22, 23 from the album Das ist nicht die ganze Wahrheit...
- Track 2, 25 from the album Die Ärzte früher!
- Track 11 from the EP 1, 2, 3, 4 – Bullenstaat!
- Track 14, 19, 26 from the album Die Bestie in Menschengestalt
- Track 5, 7, 13, 21, 27 from the album Planet Punk

=== Chart performance ===
Vollkommen gefangen im Schattenreich von Die Ärzte peaked at No. 71 in Germany.

=== Certifications ===
Region	Certification	Certified units/sales
Germany (BVMI)	Gold	25,000^{^}
^{^} Shipments figures based on certification alone.
