= Live – Nach uns die Sintflut =

Live album by Die Ärzte
- Released: 27 October 1988
- Recorded: 1988
- Genre: Punk rock
- Length: 128:30
- Label: CBS Schallplatten
- Producer: Uwe Hoffmann & Die Ärzte

Die Ärzte chronology
Das ist nicht die ganze Wahrheit... (1988)	Live – Nach uns die Sintflut (1988)	Die Ärzte früher! (1989)

"Live – Nach uns die Sintflut"
- 2026 vinyl version

Singles from Live – Nach uns die Sintflut
- 1. "Der Ritt auf dem Schmetterling (Instrumental)" Released: 27 October 1988; 2. "Live – Zu spät..." Released: 1988

Professional ratings
Review scores
Source	Rating
laut.de	5/5 stars
Musikexpress	4/6 stars

Live – Nach uns die Sintflut ("Devil may care"; lit. "Après nous, le déluge") ("After us came the great flood": The title of this album is a biblical reference to the great flood described in the book of Genesis. In the "Spruche" section on disc 3 is grab of dialogue from Farin stating (in German) "In the beginning, God created the heavens and the earth, a little bit later, he created all of you, and then, when he was feeling really good, he made us.") Nach uns die Sintflut is the eighth album by German rock band Die Ärzte. It is their first live album, released on triple vinyl and double CD, just before the band disbanded.

The band risked with this album being 'indexed' (banned) because of a third sequel of Claudia (Debil - "Claudia hat 'nen Schäferhund" [indexed]; Ab 18 - "Claudia II") and the bonus single featuring the indexed "Geschwisterliebe", sung entirely by fans while the band played.

The album featured many songs written especially to be played live, such as "Madonnas Dickdarm", "Claudia", "Ich bin wild" and "Uns geht's prima". "Madonnas Dickdarm" and "Claudia" (as "Claudia III", shortened) were later released on Das Beste von kurz nach früher bis jetze, along with "Blumen" and "Elke".

The first "Sprüche" is on this album. "Sprüche II" is found on Wir wollen nur deine Seele, the only other 2-CD live album by Die Ärzte. "Sprüche III" was released as the B-side to "Die klügsten Männer der Welt". A part of "Sprüche" was sampled on "Claudia (Teil 95)" on Die Bestie in Menschengestalt (Ja, er starb!-Yes, he died!)

== Track listing ==
CD 1

1. "Ouvertüre zum besten Konzert der Welt" [Overture to the best concert in the world] - 1:34
2. "Radio brennt" [Radio burns] - 2:26
3. "Mädchen" [Girls] - 2:32
4. "Frank'n'stein" - 2:04
5. "Ohne dich" [Without you] - 2:02
6. "Blumen" [Flowers] - 3:01
7. "Sweet Sweet Gwendoline" - 2:04
8. "Alleine in der Nacht" [Alone in the night] - 2:31
9. "Außerirdische" [Aliens] - 2:16
10. "Buddy Holly's Brille" [Buddy Holly's glasses] - 3:48
11. "Popstar" - 3:07
12. "El Cattivo" [Bad (in Italian)] - 2:46
13. "Madonnas Dickdarm" [Madonna's colon] - 1:53
14. "Dein Vampyr" [Your vampyre] - 2:31
15. "Siegerin" [Winner (female)] - 2:10
16. "Westerland" - 3:41
17. "2000 Mädchen" [2,000 girls] - 2:51
18. "Mysteryland" - 3:24
19. "Du willst mich küssen" [You want to kiss me] - 2:59
20. "Gute Zeit" [Have a nice time] - 2:56
21. "Helmut K." - 2:11
22. "Wie am ersten Tag" [Like on the first day] - 2:51

CD 2

1. "Wer hat an der Uhr gedreht?" (F. Strittmatter, Q. Amper Jr/E. Storeck) - 0:30
2. "Medley"
  - a) "When Will I Be Famous" (Bros) - 0:39
  - b) "Tell It to My Heart" (Seth Swirsky, Ernie Gold) - 0:17
  - c) "Whenever You Need Somebody" (Stock, Aitken and Waterman) - 0:09
  - d) "I Should Be So Lucky" (Stock, Aitken and Waterman) - 0:07
  - e) "My Bed Is Too Big" (Dieter Bohlen) - 0:10
  - f) "Born to Love" (Melloni, Turratti, Chieregato, Beecher) - 0:06
  - g) "Kiss" (Prince) - 0:15
  - h) "Zu spät" [Too late] (Farin Urlaub) - 3:55
  - i) "Blueprint" (K. Franck) - 0:23
3. "Elke" - 3:53
4. "Ist das alles?" [Is that all?] - 3:05
5. "Claudia" - 4:58
6. "Radio Rap" - 2:31
7. "Roter Minirock" [Red miniskirt] - 2:01
8. "Scheisstyp" [Shitty guy] - 2:17
9. "Sie kratzt" [She scratches] - 2:10
10. "Teenager Liebe" [Teenager love] - 2:36
11. "Vollmilch" [Whole milk] - 2:15
12. "Ich bin wild" [I'm wild] - 3:34
13. "Uns geht's prima" [We're doing great] - 1:48
14. "Sprüche" [Patter] - 18:50
15. "♀" - 10:02

Bonus single

1. "Der Ritt auf dem Schmetterling (Instrumental)" [The ride on the butterfly] - 4:05

== Song information ==
Tracks not listed below were first released on this album.

- Tracks 3, 4, 12 (CD1), "Zu spät", tracks 7, 8 (CD2) from Debil
- Tracks 7, 8, 18, 22 (CD1), 4 (CD2) from Die Ärzte
- Tracks 10, 14, 19 (CD1) from Im Schatten der Ärzte
- Tracks 2, 17 (CD1) from Ist das alles? (13 Höhepunkte mit den Ärzten)
- Track 6 (CD2) from "Radio brennt (Dingleberry-Mix)"
- Tracks 21 (CD1), 9 (CD2) from Ab 18
- Tracks 5, 6, 9, 11, 15, 16, 20 (CD1), 3, 15 (CD2) from Das ist nicht die ganze Wahrheit...
- "Teenager Liebe" and "Vollmilch" were later released on Die Ärzte früher!, but "Teenager Liebe" was before also released on Zu schön, um wahr zu sein! and Uns geht's prima...

== Singles ==
1988: "Der Ritt auf dem Schmetterling (Instrumental)" (bonus single included with earlier versions of the album)
1988: "Live – Zu spät..."

== Personnel ==
- Farin Urlaub – guitar, vocals
- Bela Felsenheimer – drums, vocals
- Hagen Liebing – bass guitar, vocals

== Charts ==
Land	Chart position
Germany	1
