= GötterDÄmmerung (Die Ärzte tribute album) =

Compilation album by various artists
- Released: October 1997
- Genre: Punk rock
- Length: 51:23
- Label: Gringo Records/Intercord
- Producer: Various

Various artists chronology
Le Frisur (1996)	GötterDÄmmerung (1997)	13 (1998)

Götterdämmerung ("Twilight of the Gods") is a tribute album to Die Ärzte. It was created and published in 1997 on the initiative of their fan club.

== Track listing ==
=== CD1 ===
No.	Title	Band/Producer	Length
1.	"Intro"	Joey DeMaio/-	00:16
2.	"Mach die Augen zu" (Close your eyes)	Terrorgruppe/Uwe Hoffmann	03:13
3.	"Zu spät" (Too late)	Mr. Ed Jumps the Gun/Ralf Goldkind & Mr. Ed Jumps the Gun	02:57
4.	"Sweet Sweet Gwendoline"	The Butlers/Olaf Wilms & Rolf Wölter	02:51
5.	"Madonnas Dickdarm" (Madonna's colon)	Die Fantastischen Vier/And.Y & Hausmarke	02:30
6.	"Elke"	Sodom feat. Alex Kraft/Tom Angelripper	03:17
7.	"Mysteryland"	Stimpy/Ronnie	02:46
8.	"Wie ein Kind" (Like a child)	The Travelling Suurbiers/Gördi	03:44
9.	"Mit dem Schwert nach Polen, warum René?" (With a sword to Poland, why René?)	Lemonbabies/Pattino & Lemonbabies	05:02
10.	"Anneliese Schmidt"	Wizo/Axel Kurth & Nico Berthold	03:21
11.	"Radio brennt" (Radio burns)	Prollhead/Ronnie Henseler	04:30
12.	"Mein Baby war beim Frisör" (My baby's been to the hairdresser's)	Heinz Strunk/Heinz Strunk	02:12
13.	"Für immer" (For ever)	The Incredible Hagen feat. Anya/Sven Haeusler	03:10
14.	"Quark"	Wiglaf Droste & Dziuks Küche/Milo	03:47
15.	"30-Jahre-Bauch (3-Tage-Bart)" (30-years-body (Stubble))	Fluchtweg/Franzi Teutler	02:14
16.	"Wie am ersten Tag" (Like on the first day)	Church of Confidence/Rodrigo González	02:42
17.	"Alleine in der Nacht" (Alone in the night)	La Cry/Yenz Voigt	02:25
18.	"Teenager Liebe" (Teenager love)	Der wahre Heino/Gördi Gerhardt	03:23
19.	"Der Allerschürfste (Die Allerschürfste)" (The Superhottest)	Lucilectric/Luci van Org & Ralf Goldkind	02:55

=== CD2 ===
No.	Title	Band/Producer	Length
1.	"(Von wegen) Westerland (Westerland)"	FC St. Pauli feat. Witte XP/Uwe Hoffmann & Martin Witte	03:40
2.	"Ich weiß nicht, (ob es Liebe ist...)" (I don't know (if it's love))	Armageddon Dildos/M.Black	03:07
3.	"Du willst mich küssen (Spezial-Version)" (You want to kiss me)	Die Kassierer/Die Kassierer	02:33
4.	"Bitte bitte" (Please please)	Schweisser/Ralf Weigand	03:46
5.	"Meine Ex(plodierte Freundin)" (My ex(ploded girlfriend))	The Inchtabokatables/The Voodoo	03:07
6.	"Der lustige Astronaut" (The jolly astronaut)	Fury in the Slaughterhouse/Paul Grau & F.i.t.S.	03:36
7.	""Was hat der Junge doch für Nerven"" ("The nerves of that guy...")	Fettes Brot/Dougie & Fettes Brot & Mario von Hacht	04:18
8.	"Rod loves you (Rod is cummin'- Mix)"	P-Pack feat.CPS/Milo	04:09
9.	"No future (ohne neue Haarfrisur)" (No future (without a new haircut))	MC Lüde & Frank Z./Rodrigo González	03:51
10.	"Cry for love (Schrei nach Liebe)"	The Chainsaw Hollies/Atze Ludwig & Siggi Bemm	04:05
11.	"Lieber Tee" (Rather tea)	Bronx Boys/Bronx Boys & Witte	05:11
12.	"El Cattivo" (The Bad)	Mad Sin/Mourad Köfte Calvies	04:15
13.	"Hurra" (Hooray)	Pankow	03:52
14.	"Am Ende meines Körpers" (At the end of my body)	Pothead/Pothead	02:29
15.	"Schunder-Song"	Die kleine Tierschau/Ralf Schübel	03:12

== Reception ==
Michael Rensen describes the tribute album in the 126th issue of Rock Hard magazine as a disappointment. The recorded titles of the bands are powerless and lacking in ideas and overall he can't recommend the album.
