= Die Ärzte (EP) =

EP by Die Ärzte
- Released: 1987
- Genre: Punk rock
- Label: Amiga
- Producer: Track 1: Die Ärzte; Track 2: Manne Praeker; Track 3: Uwe Hoffmann & Die Ärzte; Track 4: Micki Meuser

Die Ärzte is an EP with songs of German rock band Die Ärzte, released under the Amiga label in 1987 as part of its Amiga Quartett series. It was released in East Germany without the knowledge of Die Ärzte and they received no royalties.

== Track listing ==
1. "Zu spät" [Too late] - 3:12
2. "Gehn wie ein Ägypter" (Liam Sternberg/Die Ärzte) - 2:20 (cover of "Walk Like an Egyptian" in German)
3. "Radio brennt" [Radio burns] - 2:41
4. "Du willst mich küssen" [You want to kiss me] - 3:09
