= Die Ärzte (2002 album) =

Die Ärzte ディ・エルツテ

Greatest hits album by Die Ärzte
- Released: 20 March 2002
- Recorded: 1995–2000
- Genre: Punk rock, pop punk
- Label: Howling Bull
- Producer: Uwe Hoffmann and Die Ärzte

Die Ärzte chronology
5, 6, 7, 8 – Bullenstaat! (2001)	Die Ärzte ディ・エルツテ (2002)	Unplugged – Rock'n'Roll Realschule (2002)

Die Ärzte (also stylized die ärzte; Japanese: ディ・エルツテ) is a best-of compilation by German rock band Die Ärzte, released exclusively in Japan in 2002. The band also had previously released a studio album titled Die Ärzte in 1986.

== Track listing ==
(Songwriters listed in brackets)

1. "Wie es geht" [How it's done] (Urlaub) – 3:58
2. "Ein Lied für dich" [A song for you] (Urlaub) – 2:43
3. "1/2 Lovesong" (González/Felsenheimer, González) – 3:52
4. "Yoko Ono" (Urlaub) – 0:30
5. "Rock Rendezvous" (Felsenheimer) – 4:08
6. "Kann es sein?" [Can it be?] (González/Felsenheimer) – 2:47
7. "Ignorama" (Felsenheimer, González/Felsenheimer) – 2:46
8. "3-Tage-Bart" [Designer stubble, lit: 3-days-beard] (Felsenheimer, Urlaub/Urlaub) – 3:03
9. "Super Drei" [Super three] (González, Urlaub/González, Felsenheimer, Urlaub) – 2:15
10. "Der Graf" [The Count] (Felsenheimer) – 3:44
11. "N 48.3" (Urlaub) – 2:51
12. "No Future (Ohne neue Haarfrisur)" [Without a new haircut] (Urlaub) – 2:07
13. "Vokuhila Superstar" [Mullet superstar] (Felsenheimer) – 4:59
14. "Rebell" [Rebel] (Urlaub) – 3:51
15. "Meine Freunde" [My friends] (Urlaub) – 1:47
16. "Manchmal haben Frauen..." [Sometimes women have...] (Felsenheimer) – 4:13
17. "Medusa-Man (Serienmörder Ralf)" [Serial killer Ralf] (Felsenheimer, Ludwig/Felsenheimer) – 5:56
18. "Schunder-Song" (Urlaub) – 3:06
19. "Grotesksong" [Grotesque song] (Urlaub) – 3:40
20. "Hurra" [Hooray] (Urlaub) – 3:26
21. "Die traurige Ballade von Susi Spakowski" [The sad ballad of Susi Spakowski] (Felsenheimer) – 4:01
22. "Dauerwelle vs. Minipli" [Permanent wave vs. minipli] (Felsenheimer, González/Urlaub) – 0:53

=== Japanese track titles ===
1. 恋の行方 Koi no Kōhō
2. 君への唄 Kimi e no uta
3. ハーフラブソング Hāfu rabu songu
4. ヨーコ・オノ Yōko Ono
5. ロック・ランデブー Rokku randebū
6. 素晴らしきラブソング Subarashiki rabu songu
7. イグノラマ Igunorama
8. セクシー不精ヒゲ Sekushī bushō hige
9. スーパー3 Sūpā 3
10. ドラキュラ斜陽族 Dorakyura shayōzoku
11. 持続性陰茎勃起症 Jizokusei inkei bokki-shō
12. 横わけノーフューチャー Yoko wake nō fyūchā
13. や・ば・い・よ・髪型 Ya-ba-i-yo kamigata
14. 反抗期 Hankō-ki
15. ホモダチS&M Homodachi S&M
16. 時に女は Toki ni onna wa
17. シリアルキラー Shiriaru kirā
18. 復讐するは我にあり Fukushū suru wa ware ni ari
19. グロテスク・ソング Gurotesuku songu
20. 万歳 Banzai
21. スージー・スパコフスキのバラード Sūjī Supakofusuki no Barādo
22. アイパーVSパンチ Aipā VS Panchi

== Song information ==
- Tracks 9, 18, 20, 21 are from Planet Punk
- Tracks 8, 12, 13, 17, 22 are from Le Frisur
- Tracks 2, 3, 7, 10, 14, 15, 19 are from 13
- Tracks 1, 4–6, 11, 16 are from Runter mit den Spendierhosen, Unsichtbarer!

== Personnel ==
- Farin Urlaub – guitar, vocals
- Bela Felsenheimer – drums, vocals
- Rodrigo González – bass, vocals
- Diane Weigmann – additional vocals on 16
