= Götterdämmerung (disambiguation) =

Götterdämmerung is an 1876 opera by Richard Wagner, the last in his cycle of four music dramas titled Der Ring des Nibelungen.

Götterdämmerung may also refer to:

- Götterdämmerung (Megaherz album), 2012 German industrial metal band Megaherz
- GötterDÄmmerung (Die Ärzte tribute album), 1997 tribute album to the German punk band Die Ärzte
- Götterdämmerung, the giant space battleship of the Fourth Reich in the 2012 film Iron Sky
- ”Götterdämmerung” a song on the album Zeal & Ardor by Zeal & Ardor
- Götterdämmerung, a DLC for the grand strategy game Hearts of Iron IV
