= Männer haben kein Gehirn =

Live album by Die Ärzte
- Released: October 2001
- Recorded: 2001
- Genre: Spoken
- Length: 73:15
- Producer: Uwe Hoffmann & Die Ärzte

Die Ärzte chronology
5, 6, 7, 8 – Bullenstaat! (2001)	Männer haben kein Gehirn (2001)	Die Ärzte (2002)

Männer haben kein Gehirn (Men don't have Brains) is a promotional recording featuring live recordings from a 2001 reading tour with the German rock band Die Ärzte and Markus Karg, the author of the official biography Ein überdimensionales Meerschwein frisst die Erde auf. A CD was released for official fan club members, the audio files can be downloaded from the band's official website.

== Track listing ==
1. Nackig vorm Fahrstuhl [Nude in Front of the Elevator] - 4:00
2. Der wunderbare Brunftschrei des FU [The Wonderful Rutting Call of Farin Urlaub] - 3:01
3. Who Are Those Guys? - 2:44
4. Rockstar und Groupie [Rock Star and Groupie] - 2:50
5. Dicke fette Votze [Big Fat Cunt] - 2:46
6. Die breite Masse [The Big Masses] - 2:49
7. Pausenmusik [Musical Interlude] - 2:51
8. Famous Last Words - 2:49
9. The Asshole of the Year - 2:59
10. Monsterparty - 2:53
11. Elektrobier (unplugged) [Electro Beer] - 3:06
12. Pelzbesetzte Rührschüsseln [Fur-trimmed Mixing Bowls] - 2:47
13. Der Werschwanz [The Were-Dick] - 3:01
14. Bela, du nervst! [ Bela B., you bug us!] - 2:53
15. Heil Sahnie! [Hail Sahnie!] - 2:55
16. Stulle mit Jagdwurst [Sandwich with Jagdwurst] - 2:50
17. Heroin für Katzen [Heroin for Cats] - 3:10
18. Die Nacht von Basel [The Night of Basel]- 3:11
19. Mehr sexy [More sexy]- 2:28
20. Ein Spaziergang in Farin Urlaub [A Walk in Farin Urlaub]- 2:55
21. Pinkelpause [Pee break] - 3:04
22. Die schwanzgeile Großmutter [The cock hungry Grandmother] - 3:36
23. Lila Teppiche gegen Gewalt [Purple carpets against Violence]- 3:52
24. Der Scheidenmagnetismus a.k.a. Angriff der Fett-Teenager [The Vagina Magnetism a.k.a. Attack of the Fat-teens] - 3:45

Die Ärzte – Hören, sehen, sagen... nicht! – Die Lesetour
- Tour by Die Ärzte
- Start date: 13 September 2001
- End date: 30 September 2001
- No. of shows: 16

Die Ärzte concert chronology
- Festivals 2001 – Sommer nur für mich (2001); Hören, sehen, sagen... nicht! (2001); Garlic Boys & Die Ärzte Coupling (2002)

== Die Ärzte – Hören, sehen, sagen... nicht! – Die Lesetour ==
The Die Ärzte – Hören, sehen, sagen... nicht! – Die Lesetour (Die Ärzte - Hear, see, say... not! - The Reading Tour) is the 13th concert tour by German rock band Die Ärzte. Members Farin Urlaub, Bela B. and Rodrigo González as well as Markus Karg, the author, read out the band's official biography titled "Ein überdimensionales Meerschwein frisst die Erde auf" ["An oversized guinea pig eats the Earth"].

=== Tour dates ===
Date	City	Country
13 September 2001	Weimar	Germany
14 September 2001	Chemnitz	Germany
15 September 2001	Berlin	Germany
16 September 2001	Lübeck	Germany
17 September 2001	Bremen	Germany
18 September 2001	Garbsen	Germany
20 September 2001	Bielefeld	Germany
21 September 2001	Dortmund	Germany
22 September 2001	Frankfurt	Germany
23 September 2001	Saarbrücken	Germany
24 September 2001	Augsburg	Germany
25 September 2001	Erlangen	Germany
26 September 2001	Zürich	Switzerland
27 September 2001	Vienna	Austria
29 September 2001	Leipzig	Germany
30 September 2001	Berlin	Germany
