= Ab 18 =

Compilation album by Die Ärzte
- Released: 21 October 1987
- Recorded: 1984–1987
- Genre: Punk rock
- Length: 21:11
- Label: CBS Schallplatten
- Producer: Die Ärzte (tracks 1, 3–7); Manne Praeker (track 2)

Die Ärzte chronology
Ist das alles? (13 Höhepunkte mit den Ärzten) (1987)	Ab 18 (1987)	Das ist nicht die ganze Wahrheit... (1988)

Ab 18 [Over 18] is the sixth album by German rock band Die Ärzte. It is an EP compilation of which three songs were put in the German List of Media Harmful to Young People. The album was banned in Germany on 10 December that same year. The banned songs were, at the time, "Geschwisterliebe", "Claudia hat 'nen Schäferhund" and "Schlaflied". As of 2022, only "Geschwisterliebe" is still banned and Streaming Services like Spotify offer the album to German Users in a censored version that omits that song.

== Background ==
Ab 18 includes, among other things, the songs "Geschwisterliebe" and "Claudia hat 'nen Schäferhund" which were indexed at the time of the release of the album and "Schlaflied". Another previously released song on the record was "Sweet Sweet Gwendoline", which already appeared on Die Ärzte and was not indexed. However, it was controversial because of the glorification of sadomasochism. New songs include "Sie kratzt, sie stinkt sie klebt" and "Claudia II", the sequel to "Claudia hat nen Schäferhund". Another song was "Helmut K.", which claimed that Helmut Kohl tyrannized his wife and about which it was later falsely stated that it had been banned in Bavaria. After the suicide of Hannelore Kohl In 2001, Die Ärzte distanced themselves from the song "Helmut K." and no longer played it for a few years at their concerts until it was taken back into the set on 29 December 2006 at the concert in SO36 in Berlin.

The album Ab 18 was indexed on 31 October 1987. However, Die Ärzte had anticipated this move by the Federal Department for Media Harmful to Young People and had a sticker put on the CD with the label "This CD may not be advertized and made available to young people for reasons of Youth Protection". The inner cover itself was indexed on 31 December 1987 as well. In the track list of the LP in the first edition there was a spelling mistake: Gwendoline was written with y instead of i. This was corrected in the second edition. The album, despite its indexing, reached position 33 in the German album charts. There were no single releases of any of the songs on this album.

== Track listing ==
1. "Sie kratzt, sie stinkt, sie klebt" [She scratches, she stinks, she sticks] – 2:31
2. "Geschwisterliebe" [Sibling love] – 4:11
3. "Helmut K." – 2:34
4. "Claudia hat 'nen Schäferhund" [Claudia has a German Shepherd] – 2:00
5. "Claudia II" – 2:30
6. "Sweet Sweet Gwendoline" – 2:55
7. "Schlaflied" [Lullaby] – 4:30

=== Information ===
- Tracks 1, 3, 5: new
- Tracks 2, 6: from Die Ärzte
- Tracks 4, 7: from Debil

== Themes ==
- "Sie kratzt, sie stinkt, sie klebt" is sung from the perspective of a man who is in love with a disgusting girl.
- "Geschwisterliebe" is about incest between siblings.
- "Helmut K." depicts Helmut Kohl as a wife-beater, stating that he is just a man like every other.
- "Claudia hat 'nen Schäferhund" is about zoophilia, between a woman and a dog.
- "Claudia II" is the sequel to "Claudia hat 'nen Schäferhund"; now Claudia has a horse. There is also a third song, found on Live – Nach uns die Sintflut and Das Beste von kurz nach früher bis jetze, where Claudia tries with a man, but fails, ending up with a humpback whale.
- "Sweet Sweet Gwendoline" is about bondage; the title is from the Sweet Gwendoline comic series; Gwendoline is also Die Ärzte's mascot; the song features lines at the beginning and in the end, which were not on the Die Ärzte version.
- "Schlaflied" is about a monster coming and eating you after you fall asleep.

== Personnel ==
- Farin Urlaub – guitar, vocals
- Bela Felsenheimer – drums, vocals
- Hagen Liebing – bass guitar on 1, 3, 5
- Hans Runge – bass guitar on 4, 7
- Manne Praeker – bass guitar on 2, 6

== Charts ==
Chart (1994)	Peak position
German Albums (Offizielle Top 100)	33
