= Laut.de =

German-language online magazine

laut.de
- Website type: Online database for music albums, artists and songs; reviews and biographies
- Available in: German
- Founded: 1996
- Area served: Germany
- Owner: Laut AG
- Founder: Rainer Henze
- Website: laut.de
- Commercial: Yes (My Music Channel)
- Current status: Online

laut.de is a German online magazine covering music and entertainment. It was founded in Konstanz in 1996 by Rainer Henze and reports on current events in the pop music, rock music, alternative, metal, hip-hop, jazz and techno genres, providing record reviews, interviews, artist biographies, music-related news, as well as concert reports and recommendations to its readers.

In June 2005, laut.de launched the Internet radio laut.fm with an exclusive live recording of the song "Radio brennt" by German punk rock band Die Ärzte. From December 2006 there was also a daily podcast. At the Popkomm 2007, music video platform laut.tv was presented.

Laut.de had 2.5 million visits per month as of October 2006. The website reached over 500,000 individual readers through August 2018. The webzine has received several awards: Online Redaktion 2002, the Digital Lifestyle Award 2008, and the category "Deutschland - Land der Ideen" 2009.

Today, it is owned by Laut AG.

== Recognitions and awards ==
laut.de was the winner of the 2002 online editorial category prize of the Landesanstalt für Kommunikation Baden-Württemberg. The Department of Germanic Languages and Literatures at the University of Michigan ranked it first on its list of recommended online music magazines, praising its wide-ranging coverage. In November 2011, Tonight.de also acclaimed the broad coverage of laut.de.
