= Wie es geht =

Single by Die Ärzte

from the album Runter mit den Spendierhosen, Unsichtbarer!
- Released: 21 August 2000
- Genre: Punk rock, Pop punk
- Length: 3:40; 3:58 (album version)
- Label: Hot Action Records
- Songwriter(s): Farin Urlaub
- Producer(s): Uwe Hoffmann & Die Ärzte

Die Ärzte singles chronology
"Die Schönen und das Biest: Elke (live)" (1999)	"Wie es geht" (2000)	"Manchmal haben Frauen..." (2000)

"Wie es geht" ("How to do it", lit. "How it goes") is a punk song by Die Ärzte. It is the first track and the first single from their 2000 album Runter mit den Spendierhosen, Unsichtbarer!. The singer addresses a woman, trying several times to tell her "I love you", but keeps on ending up saying "(I just don't know) how to do it"; at the end of the song he finally manages to say the words.

The packaging of the single was made to resemble a cheap, consumer level CD-R and alludes to music piracy.

== The video ==
In the video, most of the time, the band is performing the song on a yacht. Other scenes include the band driving a motorboat and Farin singing to different women.

== Track listing ==
1. "Wie es geht" (Urlaub) - 3:40
2. "Poser, du bist ein..." (Felsenheimer) - 2:00
3. "Die Instrumente des Orchesters" (Urlaub) - 2:36
4. "Kpt. Blaubär (Extended Version)" (Urlaub, Felsenheimer, Gonzalez) - 4:17
5. "Halsabschneider" (Urlaub) - 1:28

== Personnel ==
- Farin Urlaub - vocals, guitar
- Rodrigo González - bass
- Bela B. - drums

== B-sides ==
- "Poser, du bist ein..." ("Poser, you are a...") criticises people who want all the attention.
- "Die Instrumente des Orchesters" ("The instruments of the orchestra") is an ode to the guitar, which is not included on the vinyl single.
- "Kpt. Blaubär" ("Cpt. Bluebear") is about a seaman who tells made-up and exaggerated stories (Käpt'n. Blaubär is a popular German cartoon character; the song is a longer version of the one on the soundtrack of "Käpt'n Blaubär", which is titled "Bleib sauber, Blaubär").
- "Halsabschneider" ("Neckchopper") is a song against Jörg Haider.

== Charts ==
=== Weekly charts ===
Chart (2000)	Peak position
Austria (Ö3 Austria Top 40)	12
Germany (GfK)	5
Switzerland (Schweizer Hitparade)	36

=== Year-end charts ===
Chart (2000)	Position
Germany (Official German Charts)	66
