= 5, 6, 7, 8 – Bullenstaat! =

Studio album by Die Ärzte
- Released: 7 March 2001
- Genres: Punk rock, hardcore punk
- Length: 38:17
- Label: Hot Action Records
- Producers: Uwe Hoffmann & Die Ärzte

Die Ärzte chronology
Runter mit den Spendierhosen, Unsichtbarer! (2000)	5, 6, 7, 8 – Bullenstaat! (2001)	Die Ärzte (2002)

5, 6, 7, 8 – Bullenstaat! [5, 6, 7, 8 – Cop state!] is an album by German rock band Die Ärzte, originally only sold at concerts. Now the album is available as a digital download for free on Die Ärzte's website. There are also songs from 1, 2, 3, 4 – Bullenstaat! EP (released in 1995) as bonus tracks.

== Track listing ==
All music is composed by Die Ärzte, except where noted.

No.	Title	Lyrics	English translation	Length
1.	"Punkbabies"	Felsenheimer		0:41
2.	"West-Berlin"	Urlaub		0:44
3.	"McDonald's" (music: Felsenheimer)	Felsenheimer		0:20
4.	"Bravopunks"	Felsenheimer	Bravo punks	1:15
5.	"A-moll"	Urlaub	A-minor	0:30
6.	"Chile 3" (music: González)	Gonzàlez		0:41
7.	"Elektrobier"	Felsenheimer	Electro beer	1:20
8.	"Deutschland verdrecke"	Felsenheimer	Germany get filthy	0:33
9.	"That's Punkrock"	Felsenheimer		1:01
10.	"Hass auf Bier"	Felsenheimer	Hate for beer	0:40
11.	"Bullenschwein"	Felsenheimer	Cop-pig (German pejorative for a police-person)	0:06
12.	"Cops underwater"	Urlaub		1:32
13.	"Ich bin ein Punk"	Urlaub	I am a punk	0:41
14.	"Rockabilly War"	Urlaub		0:39
15.	"Biergourmet"	Felsenheimer	Beer gourmet	0:37
16.	"Widerstand"	Urlaub	Resistance	0:42
17.	"Killing Joke"	Die Ärzte		1:08
18.	"Rache"	Felsenheimer	Revenge	0:19
19.	"Studentenmädchen"	Felsenheimer	Student girl	1:03
20.	"Geboren zu verlieren" (music: Urlaub, Felsenheimer)	Urlaub, Felsenheimer	Born to lose	1:17
21.	"Rockabilly Peace"	Felsenheimer		0:49
22.	"Tränengas"	Urlaub	Tear gas	0:59
23.	"'Tschuldigung Bier"	Felsenheimer	Sorry beer	1:21
24.	"Knüppelbullendub"	Die Ärzte	Baton-cop-dub	1:41
25.	"Ich bin glücklich" (music: Urlaub)	Urlaub	I am happy	1:15

Bonus tracks
No.	Title	Writer(s)	English translation	Length
26.	"1 2XU"	Gilbert, Lewis, Newman, Gotobed (Wire)		1:18
27.	"Ihr Helden"	Peter Blümer (Hass)	You heroes	1:25
28.	"I Hate Hitler"	Stephane Larsson (Buttocks)		0:41
29.	"Samen im Darm"	Michael Reimann, Frank Bekedorf, Frank Schrader, Thomas Tier (Cretins)	Semen in the bowel	4:02
30.	"BGS"	Stephane Larsson (Buttocks)	Bundesgrenzschutz – Federal Border Guard	1:03
31.	"Kein Problem"	Horst Illing/Ernst August Wehmer (Rotzkotz)	No problem	2:58
32.	"Tittenfetischisten"	Brutal Glöckel Terror	Titsfetishists	0:08
33.	"Paul"	Urlaub		3:00
34.	"So froh"	DP/Timo Bluck, Detlef Diederichsen (Ede & die Zimmermänner)	So happy	0:23

== Personnel ==
- Farin Urlaub: guitar, vocals
- Bela B: drums, vocals
- Rodrigo González: bass guitar, vocals
