= Geschwisterliebe =

1986 song by Die Ärzte

Song by Die Ärzte

from the album Die Ärzte
- Released: 1986
- Genre: Punk rock, power pop
- Length: 4:11
- Label: CBS Schallplatten
- Songwriter: Farin Urlaub
- Producer: Manne Praeker

"Der Ritt auf dem Schmetterling (Instrumental)"

Single by Die Ärzte

from the album Live – Nach uns die Sintflut
- Released: 27 October 1988
- Genre: Punk rock
- Length: 4:05
- Label: CBS Schallplatten
- Songwriter: Farin Urlaub
- Producers: Uwe Hoffmann & Die Ärzte

Die Ärzte singles chronology
"Westerland" (1988)	"Der Ritt auf dem Schmetterling (Instrumental)" (1988)	"Live - Zu spät..." (1988)

"Geschwisterliebe" (Sibling love) is a controversial song by German rock band Die Ärzte from the album Die Ärzte. It deals with incest and was added to the German List of Media Harmful to Young People in 1987 and is still in the index.

The song follows an incident between a boy and his 14-year-old sister, where they are left alone by the parents and then engage in intercourse; it is also implied that this will be repeated from another position. Farin Urlaub, who wrote this song, thanks his younger half-sister ironically in the booklet of the album, "for her super sibling love".

According to Urlaub, he wrote the song at age 15, in 1979. The song however, was not released until 1986, on the self-titled album Die Ärzte. The song had been a part of their concert setlists for a long time and since "Claudia hat 'nen Schäferhund", a song about zoophilia, released on Debil, made it without being put on the index, it was decided that "Geschwisterliebe" would be released. The album was, however, indexed due to a complaint from a mother on 27 January 1987, because of this song – it was decided that this song encouraged sex between siblings. This also led to Debil's being indexed due to the songs "Claudia hat 'nen Schäferhund" (Claudia has a German Shepherd) and "Schlaflied" (Lullaby, about a monster eating you gruesomely after you fall asleep).

Indexing the two albums, Die Ärzte and Debil, was a strong setback for Die Ärzte, because the indexed albums were not to be sold to minors and one retailer took the whole of the band's works from its shelves. Die Ärzte could not play the song live anymore, and one concert was limited to persons over 18 only. In 2004 the indexing of the songs was reviewed and Debil was removed from the index (which was celebrated with a re-release of the album), but "Geschwisterliebe" stayed on the index. This effect is seen on Die Ärzte's homepage, where "Geschwisterliebe" is not shown in either the track list of Die Ärzte or Ab 18. Also the banned lyrics are not available, and the MP3 cannot be purchased.

Several versions of the song have been released:

- It was first released in a shortened version with the magazine Musikexpress/Sounds;
- The original version was released in 1986 on Die Ärzte and in 1987 on the compilation EP Ab 18. The song was recorded under live conditions and thus there is no full studio version;
- An instrumental version was released as the B-side of "Gehn wie ein Ägypter", titled "...Liebe".

== Der Ritt auf dem Schmetterling (Instrumental) ==
It was once played live as an instrumental, but the crowd sang the lyrics (not directly encouraged by Die Ärzte). This version was released as a bonus single with early versions of the 1988 live album Nach uns die Sintflut. The bonus single version is titled "Der Ritt auf dem Schmetterling (Instrumental)" ("The ride on the butterfly"). The band was pushing its luck with this edition, but the live album survived.

== Track listing ==
1. "Der Ritt auf dem Schmetterling (Instrumental)" (Urlaub) - 4:05

== Personnel ==
- Farin Urlaub – vocals, guitar
- Manfred Praeker – bass
- Bela B. – drums
