= Bitte bitte =

Single by Die Ärzte

from the album Das ist nicht die ganze Wahrheit...
- Released: 4 April 1989
- Genre: Punk rock, electronic rock, synthpop, new wave
- Length: 3:13/7:35
- Label: CBS Schallplatten GmbH
- Songwriter: Farin Urlaub
- Producers: Uwe Hoffmann & Die Ärzte

Die Ärzte singles chronology
"Teenager Liebe (unecht)/Gute Nacht" (1989)	"Bitte bitte" (1989)	"Schrei nach Liebe" (1993)

"Bitte bitte" ("Bitte, bitte" on CD) ["Please please"] is a song by German band Die Ärzte. It is the eleventh track and the third single from their 1988 album Das ist nicht die ganze Wahrheit.... The song focuses on a desire to obey a dominatrix.

The Domina Mix was later released on "Das Beste von kurz nach früher bis jetze". The song was covered by the German band Tanzwut on their Labyrinth der Sinne album and was released as a single. The song was also covered by German band Eisbrecher on their Schicksalsmelodien album.

== Video ==
The dystopian video is about a young man who enters the Ministry for Discipline and Order (an allusion to the Federal Review Board for Media Harmful to Minors) with a Die Ärzte record. The ministry is run by a dominatrix (played by Teresa Orlowski), where books and records are checked by the censors under her control. The Die Ärzte record is listened to by the inspectors, scratched and branded with a huge censorship stamp, after which it is thrown to a monster-like garbage disposal. As the garbage disposal chokes on the record, the censors and the dominatrix try to destroy it but are unsuccessful. On the record's label, Farin Urlaub and Bela B. celebrate their triumph against the censors.

== Track listing ==
1. "Bitte bitte" (Urlaub) - 3:13
2. "Gabi gibt 'ne Party" (Urlaub, Felsenheimer) - 3:10

=== Maxi ===
1. "Bitte bitte (Domina Mix)" (Urlaub) - 7:35
2. "Bitte bitte (Single Version)" (Urlaub) - 3:13
3. "Bitte bitte (CBS Mix)" (Urlaub) - 6:06
4. "Gabi gibt 'ne Party" (Urlaub, Felsenheimer) - 3:10

== Personnel ==
- Farin Urlaub - vocals, guitar, bass
- Bela B. - synthesizer, drum machine

== B-sides ==
"Gabi gibt 'ne Party" [Gabi throws a party] is another song from Gabi & Uwe series. It was later released on "Das Beste von kurz nach früher bis jetze".

== Charts ==
=== Weekly charts ===
Chart (1989)	Peak position
West Germany (GfK)	18

=== Year-end charts ===
Chart (1989)	Position
West Germany (Official German Charts)	98
