= Ist das alles? (13 Höhepunkte mit den Ärzten) =

Compilation album by Die Ärzte
- Released: 11 September 1987
- Genre: Punk rock
- Length: 47:32
- Label: CBS Schallplatten
- Producer: Various

Die Ärzte chronology
Die Ärzte (1986)	Ist das alles? (13 Höhepunkte mit den Ärzten) (1987)	Ab 18 (1987)

Ist das alles? (13 Höhepunkte mit den Ärzten) [Is that all? (13 highlights with Die Ärzte)] is the fifth album by German rock band Die Ärzte. It is their first best-of album.

This album was released because after the indexing of Die Ärzte and Debil, only Im Schatten der Ärzte was left on the store shelves. With this album, songs from the indexed albums could also be released to a wider audience.

== Track listing ==
1. "Gehn wie ein Ägypter" (Die Ärzte/Liam Sternberg) - 2:21 (German version of "Walk like an Egyptian")
2. "Du willst mich küssen" [You want to kiss me] - 3:09
3. "2000 Mädchen" [2000 girls] - 3:56
4. "Mysteryland (Remix)" - 3:58
5. "Zu spät (Maxi-Version)" [Too late] - 6:51
6. "El Cattivo (1987 Bad Boy-Mix)" [Bad (in Italian)] - 3:13
7. "Radio brennt" [Radio burns] - 2:42
8. "Alleine in der Nacht" [Alone in the night] - 3:09
9. "Buddy Holly's Brille" [Buddy Holly's glasses] - 3:35
10. "Dein Vampyr (Remix)" [Your vampyre] - 3:09
11. "Erna P." (Urlaub/Urlaub) - 2:29
12. "Wie am ersten Tag (Remix)" [Like on the first day] - 3:40
13. "Ist das alles? (Maxi Remix)" [Is that all?] - 5:33

== Song information ==
- Tracks 1, 3, 7 are new.
- New version from 1987 of "El Cattivo" from Debil
- Track 11 from "Paul"
- Track 5 from "Zu spät (Special Maxi)"
- Tracks 2, 9 and the original version of "Dein Vampyr" from Im Schatten der Ärzte
- Track 8 and the original versions of "Mysteryland", "Wie am ersten Tag" and "Ist das alles?" from Die Ärzte
- "Ist das alles?" (Maxi Remix) includes a rendition of the "Sympathy for the Devil" solo by The Rolling Stones.

== The chart table ==
The back cover and the booklet feature fake joke-charts. The first thirteen songs make up the track list for the album, referring to the title of the album. The other part consists of other popular songs from the time, which are all, either by artist's name or song's title, referred to in "Radio brennt"; including a fake cover of "Geronimos Cadillac" by Die Ärzte.

=== Top 20 Charts ===
Platz (Place)	Vorige Plazierung (Former position)	Titel (Title)	Interpret (Interpreter)
1	44	Gehn wie ein Ägypter	Die Ärzte
2	1	Du willst mich küssen	Die Ärzte
3	NEW	2000 Mädchen	Die Ärzte
4	2	Mysteryland (Remix)	Die Ärzte
5	11	Zu spät (Maxi-Version)	Die Ärzte
6	6	El Cattivo (1987 Bad Boy-Mix)	Die Ärzte
7	NEW	Radio brennt	Die Ärzte
8	6	Alleine in der Nacht	Die Ärzte
9	10	Buddy Holly's Brille	Die Ärzte
10	2	Dein Vampyr (Remix)	Die Ärzte
11	-	Erna P.	Die Ärzte
12	1	Wie am ersten Tag (Remix)	Die Ärzte
13	4	Ist das alles? (Maxi Remix)	Die Ärzte
14	100	Geronimos Cadillac	Modern Talking
15	88	Amadeus	Falco
16	NEW	Geronimos Cadillac	Dieter + Nora
17	97	Lady in Red	Chris de Burgh
18	78	Geronimos Cadillac	Die Ärzte
19	82	Like a Virgin	Mutter Theresa (Madonna)
20	14	Geronimos Cadillac	Modern Talking

== Singles ==
1987: "Gehn wie ein Ägypter"
1987: "2000 Mädchen"
1987: "Radio brennt"

== Personnel ==
- Farin Urlaub - guitar, vocals
- Bela Felsenheimer - drums, vocals
- Hans Runge - bass guitar on 2, 5, 6, 9, 11
- Hagen Liebing - bass guitar on 1, 3, 4, 7, 8, 10

=== Producers ===
- Manne Praeker: 1, 8, 12
- Micki Meuser: 2, 9
- Die Ärzte + Hoffmann: 3, 6
- Manne Praeker; remixed by Die Ärzte + Hoffmann: 4
- Die Ärzte: 5, 11
- Micki Meuser; remixed by Die Ärzte + Hoffmann: 10
- Manne Praeker; maxi-remix by Die Ärzte + Hoffmann: 13

== Charts ==
Chart (1987)	Peak position
German Albums (Offizielle Top 100)	22

== Certifications ==
In 1993, Ist das alles? (13 Höhepunkte mit den Ärzten) was certified gold in Germany.
