= Quark (song) =

Single by Die Ärzte

from the album Die Bestie in Menschengestalt
- Released: 1994
- Genre: Punk rock
- Length: 2:44
- Label: Metronome Musik GmbH
- Songwriter: Farin Urlaub
- Producers: Uwe Hoffmann & Die Ärzte

Die Ärzte singles chronology
| "Friedenspanzer" (1994) | "Quark" (1994) | "Ein Song namens Schunder" (1995) |

"Quark" (meaning "rubbish", literally curd) is a punk song by Die Ärzte. It's the fourteenth track and the fourth single from their 1993 album Die Bestie in Menschengestalt. It's about a man, who can't handle the chattering of his consort. The single version criticises the gibberish of politicians. The single version is also on "Das Beste von kurz nach früher bis jetze".

== The video ==
In the video the single version of the song is sung. The video features the band in a bar with hillbillies and women with deep cleavage. The supposed members of the band are also dressed like hillbillies and they're eating curd while watching politicians, who are in fact the real band members, talking on TV. Also people in the bar are playing with food and throwing it at the TV-set.

== Track listing ==
1. "Quark (Neuer Text - 135% politisch korrekt)" (Urlaub) - 2:44
2. "Revolution '94 (Kopfüber in die Hölle) (...ganz neu!)" (Urlaub, Felsenheimer/Urlaub) - 2:59

=== Maxi ===
1. "Quark (Neuer Text - 135% politisch korrekt)" (Urlaub) - 2:44
2. "Revolution '94" (Urlaub, Felsenheimer/Urlaub) - 2:59
3. "Analyzer Smith (Unplugged)" (Urlaub) - 3:54
4. "Mysteryland" (Felsenheimer) - 3:48
5. "Hey Huh (in Scheiben)" (Felsenheimer/Urlaub) - 2:23
6. "Ein Haufen Gebrösel in D-Moll (Tour-Tour-Intro)" (Gonzalez, Urlaub) - 3:20

== B-sides ==
- "Revolution '94" is another version of "Kopfüber in die Hölle" (from "Die Bestie in Menschengestalt").

All other B-sides are performed live.

- "Analyzer Smith" is the English version of "Anneliese Schmidt" ("Die Ärzte früher!"), performed on MTV's Most Wanted.
- "Mysteryland" ("Die Ärzte") and "Hey Huh (in Scheiben)" ("Die Bestie in Menschengestalt") are from a concert in Heilbronn (28.05.1994).
- "Ein Haufen Gebrösel in D-Moll" is the intro for Tour-Tour.

== Charts ==
| Chart (1994) | Peak position |
|---|---|
| Germany (GfK) | 37 |
