= Uns geht's prima... =

EP by Die Ärzte
- Released: 5 May 1984
- Recorded: 1984
- Genre: Punk rock
- Length: 13:51
- Label: Vielklang
- Producer: Die Ärzte

Die Ärzte chronology
Zu schön, um wahr zu sein! (1983)	Uns geht's prima... (1984)	Debil (1984)

Uns geht's prima... ("We're Doing Great...") is the second EP by German rock band Die Ärzte. After 1983's debut EP Zu schön, um wahr zu sein!, it was their second release and raised attention when the German Red Cross initiated a lawsuit against the use of their emblem on the album's cover. Later releases of the album featured differently colored crosses on the cover.

All tracks were later released on Die Ärzte früher! and the version of "Teenager Liebe" released on this EP was released as a single.

== Track listing ==
No.	Title	Writer(s)	Length
1.	"Mein kleiner Liebling" (My Little Sweetheart)	Felsenheimer, Runge/Felsenheimer	2:26
2.	"Sommer, Palmen, Sonnenschein" (Summer, Palms, Sunshine)	Urlaub	2:50
3.	"Der lustige Astronaut" (The Merry Astronaut)	Urlaub	2:29
4.	"Kopfhaut" (Scalp)	Urlaub/Felsenheimer, Runge, Urlaub	2:57
5.	"Teenager Liebe" (Teenager Love)	Urlaub	3:18
Total length:			13:51
