= Zu spät =

Song by Die Ärzte

"Zu spät (Special Version)"

Single by Die Ärzte

from the album Debil
- Released: 1985
- Genre: Punk rock
- Length: 3:20/7:05 (Maxi)
- Label: CBS Schallplatten
- Songwriter(s): Farin Urlaub
- Producer(s): Die Ärzte

Die Ärzte singles chronology
"Paul" (1984)	"Zu spät (Special Version)" (1985)	"Original Ärztesoundtrack zum Film "Richy Guitar"" (1985)

"Zu spät (Special Maxi)"

Zu spät (German for too late) is a punk song by the German band Die Ärzte. It was written by singer Farin Urlaub and produced by the band. It was the eleventh track and the second single from their 1984 debut album Debil. The song was released as a single in 1985 in both 7" vinyl and 12" vinyl maxi formats. In 1988, a live version was re-released, appearing on the live album Nach uns die Sintflut.

== Content ==
Zu spät is a humorous song about jealousy, frustration, and dreams of revenge. The narrator laments that his girlfriend has left him for a wealthier man. In his disappointment and jealousy, he compares what he could have offered her to what she now receives from her new partner. Out of frustration, he contemplates beating up the new boyfriend but realizes that he is physically inferior, as the rival knows karate. In the chorus, the protagonist vows to become rich and famous himself — and when the girl wants him back because of his success, it will be "too late".

Doch eines Tages werd’ ich mich rächen
Ich werd’ die Herzen aller Mädchen brechen
Dann bin ich ein Star, der in der Zeitung steht
Und dann tut es Dir leid, doch dann ist es zu spät

One day I will have my revenge
I'll break the hearts of all the girls
I'll be a star featured in the papers
And then you'll be sorry, but it'll be too late

— Refrain of Zu spät

At later live performances, the lyrics were often changed — sometimes humorously reversing the situation so that the protagonist is abandoned for a poorer man. This alternate version appears on the live album Satanische Pferde. The live version on Nach uns die Sintflut also incorporates English lyrics from the song "Blueprint" (1987) by the German band Rainbirds, quoting lines like "sneak around the corner, with a blueprint of my lover, with a blueprint of my life."

== Single and Cover Art ==
The cover art of the 1985 single shows the three Die Ärzte members at the time — Farin Urlaub, Bela B, and Sahnie — looking directly at the camera. On the right side of the image, the band’s name Die+Ärzte appears written vertically in red, while the song title Zu spät is positioned at the top right, also in red. The cover for the maxi single uses the same photograph but places both the band name and title together at the top.

The 1988 live single features three photos of Farin Urlaub and Bela B performing live, each shown kneeling on stage. The song title Zu spät… appears in white text on the left, while Die Ärzte Live is placed at the top right.

== Tracks ==
=== 7" Single ===
1. Seite (1st side)

1. "Zu spät" – 3:20

2. Seite (2nd side)

1. "Mädchen" – 2:55

=== 12" Maxi single ===
Rote Seite (red side)

1. "Zu spät" (Urlaub) – 7:05

Weiße Seite (white side)

1. "Ärzte-Theme (Instrumental)" – 2:00
2. "Mädchen" – 2:55

"Live – Zu spät..."

Single by Die Ärzte

from the album Live – Nach uns die Sintflut
- Released: 1988
- Genre: Punk rock
- Length: 6:01
- Label: CBS Schallplatten
- Songwriter(s): The Brothers, E. Gold, Stock-Aitken-Waterman, Dieter Bohlen, Melloni-Turratti-Ghieregato-Beecher, Prince, Farin Urlaub, K. Franck
- Producer(s): Uwe Hoffmann & Die Ärzte

Die Ärzte singles chronology
"Der Ritt auf dem Schmetterling (Instrumental)" (1988)	"Live – Zu spät..." (1988)	"Teenager Liebe (unecht)/Gute Nacht" (1989)

== The live medley ==
"Live – Zu spät..." (1988) is a single for the medley "Zu spät (Hit Summer Mix '88)" (on the album just "Medley") from their 1988 album Live – Nach uns die Sintflut. The medley is composed of many covers, but most of it is the song "Zu spät", which actually ends the medley too (after "Blueprint").

=== Track listing ===
1. "Zu spät (Hit Summer Mix '88)"
  - "When Will I Be Famous" (Bros cover) – 0:39
  - "Tell It to My Heart" (Taylor Dayne cover) – 0:17
  - "Whenever You Need..." (O'Chi Brown cover) – 0:09
  - "I Should Be So Lucky" (Kylie Minogue cover) – 0:07
  - "My Bed Is Too Big" (Blue System cover) – 0:10
  - "Born to Love" (Den Harrow cover) – 0:06
  - "Kiss" (Prince cover) – 0:15
  - "Zu spät" – 3:55
  - "Blueprint" (Rainbirds cover) – 0:23
2. "Zu spät (Single-Remix '85)" – 3:20
3. "Sie tun es" – 3:08

==== Maxi ====
1. "Zu spät (Hit Summer Mix '88)"
2. "Zu spät (Single-Version '85)" – 3:12
3. "Zu spät (Maxi-Version '85)" – 6:43
4. "Sie tun es" – 3:05

=== B-sides ===
- "Zu spät (Single-Version '85)" was initially released on "Zu spät" (1985).
- "Zu spät (Maxi-Version '85)" was first released on "Zu spät (Special Maxi)" and later on "Ist das alles? (13 Höhepunkte mit den Ärzten)".
- "Sie tun es" [They're doing it] is one of many songs from the Gabi & Uwe series.

== Personnel ==
- Farin Urlaub – lead vocals, guitar
- Sahnie – bass
- Bela B. – drums

== Charts ==
While the original 1985 release did not chart, the live single version entered the German Singles Chart on February 6, 1989, reaching a peak position of number 25 three weeks later. It remained on the chart for ten weeks in total and was the most successful German-language song for five weeks. However, it did not chart in Austria or Switzerland.

Year	Country	Position
1989	Germany	25
