= Manchmal haben Frauen... =

2000 song by Die Ärzte

Single by Die Ärzte

from the album Runter mit den Spendierhosen, Unsichtbarer!
- Released: 10 November 2000
- Genre: Alternative rock, pop rock
- Length: 4:10
- Label: Hot Action Records
- Songwriter(s): Dirk Felsenheimer
- Producer(s): Uwe Hoffmann & Die Ärzte

Die Ärzte singles chronology
"Wie es geht" (2000)	"Manchmal haben Frauen..." (2000)	"Yoko Ono" (2001)

"Manchmal haben Frauen..." ("Sometimes, women have...") is a song by German rock band Die Ärzte. It is the eleventh track and the second single from their 2000 album Runter mit den Spendierhosen, Unsichtbarer!.

The song is about a man who meets a drunk man in a bar who tells him something that's unbelievable for him—sometimes women like a little spanking. The man rushes home and asks his girlfriend about this. The woman starts to beat the man stating that guys like him always deserve some beating.

== Music video ==
The band members are judges at a female bodybuilder show. After the show, Bela goes home with a bodybuilder. They jump in the bed and she starts to beat Bela.

== Track listing ==
1. "Manchmal haben Frauen..." – 4:10
2. "Rettet die Wale" – 1:48
3. "Matthäus 1:5:0" – 1:01
4. "Methan" – 2:16

== B-sides ==
- "Rettet die Wale" ("Save the whales") is a call to save the whales. A Japanese language version was released on the Japanese compilation "Poptastic Conversation", titled "Kujira o sukue". It's unknown if this selection was intentional, but it fits well, because in Japan, whaling is legal.
- "Matthäus 1:5:0" is about football player Lothar Matthäus, the title a pun on the German name for Matthew the Evangelist, the citation form for Bible passages and football scores.
- "Methan" ("Methane") is about people who are always looking for a fight.

== Personnel ==
- Bela B. – vocals, drums
- Farin Urlaub – guitar
- Rodrigo González – bass

== Charts ==
Year	Country	Position
2000	Germany	4
2001	Austria	62
2000	Switzerland	94
