= Radio brennt =

"Radio brennt (Remix)"

Single by Die Ärzte

from the album Ist das alles? (13 Höhepunkte mit den Ärzten)
- Released: 1987
- Genre: Punk rock
- Length: 2:41/7:00 (Maxi)
- Label: CBS Schallplatten GmbH
- Songwriters: Farin Urlaub & Dirk Felsenheimer
- Producers: Uwe Hoffmann & Die Ärzte

Die Ärzte singles chronology
"2000 Mädchen" (1987)	"Radio brennt (Remix)" (1987)	"'Die Ärzte'" (1987)

"Radio brennt" ('Radio burns') is a punk song by Die Ärzte. It was the seventh track and the third single from their 1987 album Ist das alles? (13 Höhepunkte mit den Ärzten). On the kid's shirt on the cover is Die Ärzte's mascot Sweet Gwendoline.

The song details the singer going mad over his girlfriend's choices of music whenever things are supposed to get romantic, and his resulting eagerness to wreck the offending radio. It references Falco, Chris de Burgh, Madonna and the song "Geronimo's Cadillac" by Modern Talking.

The maxi remix is separately featured on Live - Nach uns die Sintflut. There, it is titled "Radio Rap". Farin has said in the booklet of Das Beste von kurz nach früher bis jetze, that this maxi version is his all-time favourite.

== Track listing ==
1. "Radio brennt (Remix)" (Urlaub/Felsenheimer, Urlaub) - 2:41
2. "Gabi ist pleite" (Urlaub, Felsenheimer) - 2:37

=== Maxi ===
1. "Radio brennt (Dingleberry-Mix)" (Urlaub/Felsenheimer, Urlaub) - 7:00
2. "Gabi ist pleite" (Urlaub, Felsenheimer) - 2:37
3. "Radio brennt (Single-Version)" (Urlaub/Felsenheimer, Urlaub) - 2:41

== Personnel ==
- Farin Urlaub - vocals, guitar
- Rodrigo González – bass
- Bela B. - drums

== B-sides ==
"Gabi ist pleite" ('Gabi is broke') is one of many songs from the Gabi & Uwe series.

== Charts ==
Year	Country	Position
1988	Germany	50
