= Micki Meuser =

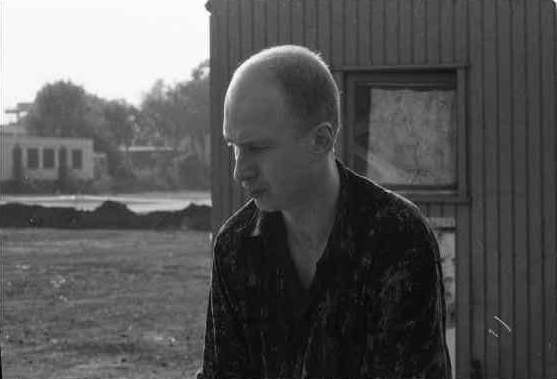
Meuser c. 1981

Hans-Georg "Micki" Meuser (also spelled Mickey; born in Alsdorf, Germany) is a German bass player, studio musician and music producer for bands such as Die Ärzte, Ideal, Silly, Ina Deter, Lemonbabies, among others.

In 1974, he played the electric bass guitar in bands like Out and the Alsdorf Big Band.

In the early 1980s, he formed the Nervösen Deutschen (Nervous Germans) and brought Australian lead singer Grant Stevens from London to Germany.

He is also a composer for film and TV, scoring such projects as Deeply and MythQuest. He lives in Berlin.
