= Ich ess' Blumen =

Single by Die Ärzte

from the album Das ist nicht die ganze Wahrheit...
- Released: 25 May 1988
- Genre: Punk rock; alternative rock
- Length: 3:44
- Label: CBS Schallplatten GmbH
- Songwriter: Dirk Felsenheimer
- Producers: Uwe Hoffmann; Die Ärzte

Die Ärzte singles chronology
"Die Ärzte" (1987)	"Ich ess' Blumen" (1988)	"Westerland" (1988)

"Ich ess' Blumen" (also known as "Blumen"; German lit. 'I eat flowers') is a punk song by Die Ärzte. It is the eighth track and the first single from their 1988 album Das ist nicht die ganze Wahrheit.... The song is an ironic ode to vegetarianism.

This song is referenced in the full title of "Nazareth (Blumen my ass)" from Planet Punk, which is about solving world hunger by eating mucus.

== Track listing ==
1. "Ich ess' Blumen" (Felsenheimer) – 3:44
2. "Das ist Rock'n'Roll" (Urlaub, Felsenheimer/Urlaub, Felsenheimer, Liebing) – 3:00

== Personnel ==
- Bela B. – vocals, drums
- Farin Urlaub – guitar, bass

== B-sides ==
"Das ist Rock'n'Roll" [That's rock'n'roll] is one of many songs from the Gabi & Uwe series.
