= Hagen Liebing =

German musician (1961–2016)

- Also known as: The Incredible Hagen
- Born: Hagen Friedrich Liebing; 18 February 1961; Berlin, Germany
- Died: 25 September 2016 (aged 55) Berlin, Germany
- Genre: Punk rock
- Occupations: Musician, music journalist
- Instrument: Bass

Hagen Friedrich Liebing (18 February 1961 – 25 September 2016), nicknamed "The Incredible Hagen", was a German musician and journalist, best known as the bassist for the influential punk band Die Ärzte.

In 1986, drummer Bela B invited him to join Die Ärzte. The two knew each other from early Berlin punk days. The band disbanded in 1988. Liebing tried his hand at journalism shortly thereafter. He wrote several articles for Der Tagesspiegel, and was the senior music editor of Tip Berlin since the mid-1990s.

When Die Ärzte reunited in 1993, Liebing did not join them. However, he did join them on stage as a special guest in 2002. In 2003, he published his memoirs The Incredible Hagen – My Years with Die Ärzte. From 2003 to 2010, he headed the Press and Public Relations at the football club Tennis Borussia Berlin.

Liebing died in Berlin on 25 September 2016 from a brain tumor.
