= Sweet Gwendoline =

Main female character in the works of bondage artist John Willie

Book cover for The Adventures of Sweet Gwendoline

Sweet Gwendoline is the main female character in the works of bondage artist John Willie, first published as a serial, usually two pages at a time, in Robert Harrison's mainstream girlie magazine Wink from June 1947 to February 1950 and later in several other magazines over the years.

In Willie's drawings and comic books, Gwendoline appears as a rather naïve blonde damsel in distress with ample curves, who is unfortunate enough to find herself tied up in scene after scene. She is rescued and also repeatedly tied up (though for benevolent reasons) by Secret Agent U-89. The moustachioed villain "Sir Dystic D'Arcy" was based on Willie himself. Though it has been compared to The Perils of Pauline, Willie stated that he had not seen the film or even heard of it until much later in his career.

In Germany, the punk band Die Ärzte recorded the song "Sweet, Sweet Gwendoline" that introduced her to a large part of the population that otherwise had no contact to the BDSM subculture. German gothic rock band Umbra et Imago, famous amongst the fetish goth scene, also recorded a song entitled "Sweet Gwendoline".

In 1984, the stories were loosely adapted in The Perils of Gwendoline in the Land of the Yik-Yak, a film by Just Jaeckin starring Tawny Kitaen in the role of Gwendoline.
