= 2000 Mädchen =

"2000 Mädchen (Radio-Mix)"

Single by Die Ärzte

from the album Ist das alles? (13 Höhepunkte mit den Ärzten)
- Released: 1987
- Genre: Punk rock
- Length: 3:31/5:55 (Maxi)
- Label: CBS Schallplatten GmbH
- Songwriter: Farin Urlaub & Dirk Felsenheimer
- Producer: Uwe Hoffmann & Die Ärzte

Die Ärzte singles chronology
| "Gehn wie ein Ägypter" (1987) | "2000 Mädchen (Radio-Mix)" (1987) | "Radio brennt" (1987) |

"2000 Mädchen (Wumme-Mix)"

"2000 Mädchen" [2000 girls] is a punk song by Die Ärzte. It was the third track and the second single from their 1987 album Ist das alles? (Is That All?) (13 Höhepunkte mit den Ärzten). It's sung from the eyes of a telephone-stalker.

== Track listing ==
1. "2000 Mädchen (Radio-Mix)" (Urlaub/Urlaub, Felsenheimer) - 3:31
2. "Nein, nein, nein" (Urlaub/Felsenheimer) - 3:42

=== Maxi ===
1. "2000 Mädchen (Wumme-Mix)" (Urlaub/Urlaub, Felsenheimer) - 5:55
2. "Nein, nein, nein" (Urlaub/Felsenheimer) - 3:42
3. "2000 Mädchen (Radio-Mix)" (Urlaub/Urlaub, Felsenheimer) - 3:31

== B-sides ==
"Nein, nein, nein" [No, no, no] is one of many songs from the Gabi & Uwe series.
