= Westerland (song) =

Single by Die Ärzte

from the album Das ist nicht die ganze Wahrheit...
- Released: 8 April 1988
- Genre: Punk rock
- Length: 3:40/9:54
- Label: CBS Schallplatten
- Songwriter(s): Farin Urlaub
- Producer(s): Uwe Hoffmann & Die Ärzte

Die Ärzte singles chronology
| "Ich ess' Blumen" (1988) | "Westerland" (1988) | "Der Ritt auf dem Schmetterling (Instrumental)" (1988) |

"Westerland (Kommerzmix)"

"Westerland" is a punk song by German band Die Ärzte. It was the fifth track and the second single from their 1988 album Das ist nicht die ganze Wahrheit.... It is an ironic ode to the city of Westerland. It was also released on Die Ärzte's first maxi single, which had the same cover as the single but tracks different from the maxi LP. "Westerland (Kommerzmix)" was later put on "Das Beste von kurz nach früher bis jetze".

The song has been covered by Die Toten Hosen in a concert.

== Personnel ==
- Farin Urlaub - vocals, guitar, bass
- Bela B. - drums, keyboards

== Track listing ==
1. "Westerland" - 3:40
2. "Westerland (Live-Version)" - 3:07

=== Maxi ===
1. "Westerland (Kommerzmix)" - 9:54
2. "Westerland (Live-Version)" - 3:07
3. "Westerland (Extended Ganja)" - 4:47

=== Maxi-CD ===
1. "Westerland" (Urlaub) - 3:40
2. "Westerland (Live-Version)" (Urlaub) - 3:07
3. "♀" (Urlaub) - 1:47

== B-sides ==
"♀" was also taken from "Das ist nicht die ganze Wahrheit...".

== Charts ==
Chart performance for "Westerland"
| Chart (1988) | Peak position |
|---|---|
| Germany (GfK) | 34 |

== Certifications ==
| Region | Certification | Certified units/sales |
|---|---|---|
| Germany (BVMI) | Gold | 250,000^{‡} |
^{‡} Sales+streaming figures based on certification alone.
