= Du willst mich küssen =

"Du willst mich küssen (Remix)"

Single by Die Ärzte

from the album Im Schatten der Ärzte
- Released: 1985
- Genre: Punk rock
- Length: 3:08/5:40 (Maxi)
- Label: CBS Schallplatten GmbH
- Songwriter: Farin Urlaub
- Producer: Mickie Meuser

Die Ärzte singles chronology
"Wegen dir" (1985)	"Du willst mich küssen (Remix)" (1985)	"Für immer" (1986)

"Du willst mich küssen (Modern-Kissing-Mix)"

"Du willst mich küssen" [You want to kiss me] is a punk song by Die Ärzte. It was the first track and the second single from their 1985 album Im Schatten der Ärzte. The maxi version was later put on "Das Beste von kurz nach früher bis jetze". The song's about a totally non-provocative man, who meets a "very provocative" girl, who wants to kiss him.

The original version has Nena singing the line "am besten heute Nacht", but in the version on Ist das alles? (13 Höhepunkte mit den Ärzten), the line is sung by Farin.

Also an English-language demo of the song, titled "You Want to Kiss Me", has been recorded and released in 2019 on the demo compilation They've Given Me Schrott! - Die Outtakes.

== Personnel ==
- Farin Urlaub - vocals, guitar
- Sahnie – bass
- Bela B. - drums

== Track listing ==
1. "Du willst mich küssen (Remix)" (Urlaub) - 3:08
2. "Die Antwort bist du" (Felsenheimer) - 3:17

=== Maxi ===
1. "Du willst mich küssen (Modern-Kissing-Mix)" (Urlaub) - 5:40
2. "Du willst mich küssen (Disco-Kuschel-Mix)" (Urlaub) - 5:47
3. "Die Antwort bist du" (Felsenheimer) - 3:17

== B-sides ==
"Die Antwort bist du" [The answer is you] is also from "Im Schatten der Ärzte".
