= Die Ärzte früher! =

Compilation album by Die Ärzte
- Released: 13 February 1989
- Recorded: 1982–1983
- Genre: Punk rock
- Length: 41:54
- Label: Vielklang
- Producer: Various

Die Ärzte chronology
Live – Nach uns die Sintflut (1988)	Die Ärzte früher! (1989)	Die Bestie in Menschengestalt (1993)

Singles from Die Ärzte früher!
- 1. "Teenager Liebe (unecht)/Gute Nacht" Released: 3 March 1989

Die Ärzte früher!/Der Ausverkauf geht weiter! [Die Ärzte earlier!/The sellout continues!] is the ninth album by German rock band Die Ärzte. It is a compilation of their early material (1982–1983), including the songs from Zu schön, um wahr zu sein! and Uns geht's prima.... It was released after they broke up.

== Track listing ==
1. "Teenager Liebe (echt)" [Teenager love (authentic)] – 2:58
2. "Anneliese Schmidt" – 3:11
3. "Der lustige Astronaut" [The merry astronaut] – 2:29
4. "Die Einsamkeit des Würstchens" [Loneliness of the sausage] – 1:32
5. "Ekelpack" [Disgust pack] – 2:04
6. "Grace Kelly" – 2:19
7. "Kopfhaut" [Headskin] – 2:48
8. "Mein kleiner Liebling" [My little darling] – 2:26
9. "Sommer, Palmen, Sonnenschein" [Summer, palms, sunshine] – 2:50
10. "Teddybär" [Teddy bear] – 2:47
11. "Tittenmaus" [Tit mouse] – 5:05
12. "Vollmilch" [Whole milk] – 1:54
13. "Wilde Mädchen" [Wild girls] – 1:20
14. "Zitroneneis" [Lemon ice cream or Lemon popsicle] – 2:16
15. "Zum Bäcker" [To the baker] – 2:08
16. "Teenager Liebe (unecht)" [Teenager love (fake)] – 3:18

== Song information ==
- Tracks 1, 2, 6, 10 from the EP Zu schön, um wahr zu sein!
- Tracks 3, 7–9, 16 from the EP Uns geht's prima...
- Tracks 12, 14, 15 from the compilation Ein Vollrausch in Stereo – 20 schäumende Stimmungshits [A Complete Intoxication in Stereo - 20 foaming mood hits]
- Tracks 4, 5 from the compilation Pesthauch des Dschungels; "Die Einsamkeit des Würstchens" as Die Ulkigen Pulkigen under the title "Die Einsamkeit der Würstchen", "Ekelpack" as Die Geilen Greise under the title "Ich hab' Udo Lindenberg die Beine amputiert" ("I have amputated the legs from Udo Lindenberg")

== Singles ==
1989: "Teenager Liebe (unecht)/Gute Nacht"

== Personnel ==
- Farin Urlaub – guitar, vocals
- Bela Felsenheimer – drums, vocals
- Hans Runge – bass guitar, vocals

=== Producers ===
- "Ekelpack" and "Die Einsamkeit des Würstchens" by Jörg Fukking, Matthias Bröckel and Die Ulkigen Pulkigen^{1}
- "Tittenmaus" and "Wilde Mädchen" by David Heilmann and Die Ärzte
- All other songs by Jörg Fukking, Matthias Bröckel and Die Ärzte

^{1} – Die Ulkigen Pulkigen is actually a pseudonym for Farin Urlaub and Bela B., used on a couple of compilations.

== Charts ==
Chart (1989)	Peak position
German Albums (Offizielle Top 100)	4
