= Im Schatten der Ärzte =

Studio album by Die Ärzte
- Released: 1985
- Recorded: 1985
- Genre: Punk rock
- Length: 41:33
- Label: CBS Schallplatten
- Producer: Micki Meuser

Die Ärzte chronology
Debil (1984)	Im Schatten der Ärzte (1985)	Die Ärzte (1986)

Singles from Im Schatten der Ärzte
- 1. "Wegen dir" Released: November 1985; 2. "Du willst mich küssen" Released: 1986

Professional ratings
Review scores
Source	Rating
Musikexpress	5/6 stars

Im Schatten der Ärzte ("In the shadow of Die Ärzte") is the second studio album by German rock band Die Ärzte.

== Track listing ==
1. "Du willst mich küssen" ("You want to kiss me") – 3:08
2. "Dein Vampyr" ("Your vampyre") – 3:18
3. "... und es regnet" ("...and it's raining") – 3:29
4. "Alles" ("Everything") – 2:55
5. "Rennen nicht laufen!" ("Run, don't walk!") – 2:52
6. "Wie ein Kind" ("Like a child") – 3:35
7. "Wie ein Kind (Reprise)" – 0:28
8. "Wegen dir" ("Because of you") – 3:14
9. "Die Antwort bist du" ("You are the answer") – 3:17
10. "Buddy Holly's Brille" ("Buddy Holly's glasses") – 3:36
11. "Käfer" ("Beetle") – 2:52
12. "Ich weiß nicht (ob es Liebe ist)" ("I don't know (if it's love)") – 3:47
13. "Was hat der Junge doch für Nerven" ("What nerve that boy has") – 4:14

== Singles ==
- 1985: "Wegen dir"
- 1986: "Du willst mich küssen"

== Personnel ==
- Farin Urlaub - guitar, vocals
- Bela B. Felsenheimer - drums, vocals
- Hans "Sahnie" Runge - bass guitar, vocals
- Nena - additional vocals on 1

== Charts ==
Land	Chart position
Germany	53
