= Das ist nicht die ganze Wahrheit... =

Studio album by Die Ärzte
- Released: 19 April 1988
- Genre: Punk rock
- Length: 43:11
- Label: CBS Schallplatten
- Producer: Uwe Hoffmann & Die Ärzte

Die Ärzte chronology
Ab 18 (1987)	Das ist nicht die ganze Wahrheit... (1988)	Live - Nach uns die Sintflut (1988)

Singles from Das ist nicht die ganze Wahrheit...
- 1. "Ich ess' Blumen" Released: 25 May 1988; 2. "Westerland" Released: 8 April 1988; 3. "Bitte, bitte" Released: 4 April 1989

Das ist nicht die ganze Wahrheit... (German pronunciation: [das ʔɪst ˈnɪçt diː ˈɡantsə ˈvaːɐ̯haɪt]; "That's not the whole truth...") is the fourth album by German rock band Die Ärzte. It was the last studio album before the band's 5-year hiatus. The title of the album is a line spoken by William Shatner in the film Airplane II: The Sequel.

"♀" (or "Schwanz ab" [Dick off]) is kind of a hidden track and not listed on the back cover, also, the lyrics are not in the booklet (it is still a separate track).

== Track listing ==
1. "Ohne dich (die Welt könnte so schön sein...)" [Without you (the world could be so beautiful...)] - 2:49
2. "Baby, ich tu's" [Baby, I'll do it] - 3:00
3. "Komm zurück" [Come back] - 3:33
4. "Wilde Welt" [Wild world] - 2:51
5. "Westerland" - 3:41
6. "Ich will dich" [I want you] - 2:18
7. "Elke" - 3:22
8. "Blumen" [Flowers] - 3:44
9. "Außerirdische" [Aliens] - 2:45
10. "Siegerin" [Winner] - 3:10
11. "Bitte, bitte" [Please please] - 3:17
12. "Popstar" - 3:12
13. "Gute Zeit" [Good time] - 3:23
14. "♀" - 1:49

== Musicians ==
- Farin Urlaub - guitar, bass guitar, vocals
- Bela Felsenheimer - drums, vocals

== Charts ==
Land	Chart position
Germany	6
Austria	13
