= Debil =

Album by Die Ärzte

Studio album by Die Ärzte
- Released: November 1984
- Recorded: 1984
- Genre: Punk rock, pop rock, punk pathetique
- Length: 37:55
- Label: CBS Schallplatten
- Producer: Die Ärzte, Stan Regal, Mattias Härtl

Die Ärzte chronology
Uns geht's prima... (1984)	Debil (1984)	Im Schatten der Ärzte (1985)

Singles from Debil
- 1. "Paul" Released: 1984; 2. "Zu spät" Released: 1985

Professional ratings
Review scores
Source	Rating
Musikexpress	6/6 stars

Debil (meaning "Moronic") is the first full-length studio album by German rock band Die Ärzte, released in 1984, following the EPs Zu schön, um wahr zu sein! and Uns geht's prima....

== Release ==
The songs "Paul" and "Zu spät" were released as singles, and did not achieve that much recognition from the public. However, a live version of "Zu spät" was released as a single from the live album Nach uns die Sintflut in 1989, which became a moderate hit in Germany landing at number 25 in GfK Entertainment charts.

"Zu spät" was described as a revenge song.

== Legacy ==
In 1987, the Federal Department for Media Harmful to Young Persons put the songs "Claudia hat 'nen Schäferhund" and "Schlaflied" on the List of Media Harmful to Young People, with the effect that they could not be sold to minors, nor publicly advertised or displayed. This ban was lifted in 2004, which led to the subsequent reissue of the album (see below).

== Track listing ==
Jungsseite ("Boys' side")
No.	Title	Lyrics	Music	Length
1.	"Ärzte-Theme" (instrumental)		Dirk Felsenheimer, Hans Runge & Jan Vetter	2:00
2.	"Scheißtyp" (Shitty guy)	Felsenheimer, D.	Felsenheimer, D.	2:55
3.	"Paul (der Bademeister)" (Paul (the pool attendant))	Vetter, J.	Vetter, J.	2:26
4.	"Kamelralley" (Camel ralley)	Felsenheimer, D., Runge, H., & Vetter, J.	Runge, H.	4:00
5.	"Frank'n'stein"	Felsenheimer, D.	Felsenheimer, D.	2:38
6.	"El cattivo" (Bad in Italian)	Vetter, J.	Vetter, J.	3:14
7.	"Claudia hat 'nen Schäferhund" (Claudia has a German Shepherd)	Vetter, J.	Vetter, J.	2:00

Mädchenseite ("Girls' side")
No.	Title	Lyrics	Music	Length
8.	"Mädchen" (Girls)	Vetter, J.	Vetter, J.	2:55
9.	"Mr. Sexpistols"	Felsenheimer, D.	Felsenheimer, D.	3:13
10.	"Micha"	Vetter, J.	Vetter, J.	2:53
11.	"Zu spät" (Too late)	Vetter, J.	Vetter, J.	2:42
12.	"Roter Minirock" (Red miniskirt)	Runge, H., & Vetter, J.	Runge, H., & Vetter, J.	2:14
13.	"Schlaflied" (Lullaby)	Vetter, J.	Vetter, J.	4:10

== Devil ==
Devil

Studio album (re-release) by Die Ärzte
- Released: 21 October 2005
- Genre: Punk rock, pop rock
- Length: 54:34
- Label: Columbia, Sony BMG
- Producer: Die Ärzte

Die Ärzte chronology
Die Band, die sie Pferd nannten (2004)	Devil (2005)	Bäst of (2006)

Professional ratings
Review scores
Source	Rating
laut.de	4/5 stars
Musikexpress	5/6 stars

Following a re-evaluation of the record by the BPjM, Debil was reissued on 21 October 2005 as Devil with slightly altered cover art and additional tracks.

=== Track listing ===
No.	Title	Length
1.	"Ärzte-Theme" (instrumental)	2:00
2.	"Scheißtyp"	2:58
3.	"Paul"	2:26
4.	"Kamelralley"	4:00
5.	"Frank'n'stein"	2:38
6.	"El cattivo"	3:12
7.	"Claudia hat 'nen Schäferhund"	1:58
8.	"Mädchen"	2:55
9.	"Mr. Sexpistols"	3:14
10.	"Micha"	2:52
11.	"Zu spät"	2:43
12.	"Roter Minirock"	2:15
13.	"Schlaflied"	4:13

Bonus tracks
No.	Title	Writer(s)	Length
14.	"Teenager Liebe" (featuring Axel Knabben; Teenager love)	Vetter, J.	2:54
15.	"Grace Kelly" (Vetter, J.)	Vetter J.	2:18
16.	"Ärzte-Theme" (featuring Axel Knabben)	Felsenheimer D., Runge, H., & Vetter, J.	1:51
17.	"Claudia hat 'nen Schäferhund" (Version vom Unikum-Tapesampler)	Vetter, J.	1:55
18.	"Füße vom Tisch" (bisher unveröffentlicht) (Feet off the table (previously unreleased))	Felsenheimer, D., & Vetter, J.	2:24

Enhanced CD
No.	Title	Writer(s)	Length
19.	"Teddybär – Video" (part-live 1983)	Felsenheimer, D.	3:21
20.	"Schlaflied – Video"	Vetter, J.	4:26

Notes

- Tracks 14–16 were previously released on Original Ärztesoundtrack zum Film "Richy Guitar".
- Track 18 also contains a hidden track, dubbed "Sahnie's Collective Wisdom" and credited to Hans Runge. It consists of a single spoken line ("Ey du Blödmann, du hast die falsche Seite aufgelegt", which means "Hey you dimwit, you've put on the wrong side"), which previously appeared at the beginning of either side of Debil 's cassette and vinyl versions.

== Personnel ==
- Farin Urlaub – guitar, vocals
- Bela Felsenheimer – drums, vocals
- Hans Runge – bass guitar, vocals

== Certifications ==
Region	Certification	Certified units/sales
Germany (BVMI)	Gold	250,000^{‡}
^{‡} Sales+streaming figures based on certification alone.
