= Die Ärzte (1986 album) =

1986 studio album by Die Ärzte

Studio album by Die Ärzte
- Released: 1986
- Genre: Punk rock
- Length: 41:50
- Label: CBS Schallplatten
- Producer: Manne Praeker

Die Ärzte chronology
Im Schatten der Ärzte (1985)	Die Ärzte (1986)	Ist das alles? (13 Höhepunkte mit den Ärzten) (1987)

Singles from Die Ärzte
- 1. "Für immer" Released: 1986; 2. "Ist das alles?" Released: 1986

Die Ärzte is the third album by German rock band Die Ärzte. The song "Geschwisterliebe", and with it the whole album, was put on the German List of Media Harmful to Young People on 27 January 1987.

This was the first album recorded since Hans Runge ("Sahnie") left the band. The bass guitar was played by their producer, Manne Praeker.

== Release ==
"Für immer" [Forever] is the first single taken from their 1986 album Die Ärzte. The song's lyrics express the singer's longing for a girl he has fallen deeply in love with, even though she is dead. It was inspired by Farin Urlaub's reverence for the late actress Marilyn Monroe.

"Ist das alles?" [Is that all?] is second single taken from Die Ärzte. It was released in 1986. The song follows the woes of a young man suffering the hardships inflicted upon him by his environment, making him tired of life and prompting him to repeatedly ask his tormentors, "Is that all?". An early unreleased version of the song, written in 1983, was titled "Omakiller" (Grandma killer).

In late 2020, a Reissue of the Album was released, which replaced "Geschwisterliebe" with the song "Frühjahrsputz", which uses the same instrumental but with different lyrics.

== Track listing ==
1. "Wie am ersten Tag" [Like on the first day] – 3:41
2. "Mysteryland" – 4:02
3. "Sweet Sweet Gwendoline" – 2:50
4. "Ist das alles?" [Is that all?] – 3:39
5. "Geschwisterliebe" [Sibling love] – 4:11
6. "Alleine in der Nacht" [Alone in the night] – 2:47
7. "Jenseits von Eden" [Beyond Eden] – 4:00 (Drafi Deutscher cover)
8. "Wir werden schön" [We become beautiful] – 4:01
9. "Für immer" [Forever] – 3:46
10. "Ich bin reich" [I am rich] – 4:22
11. "Zum letzten Mal" [For the last time] – 4:24

== Personnel ==
- Farin Urlaub – guitar, vocals
- Bela Felsenheimer – drums, vocals
- Manne Praeker – bass guitar

== Charts ==
Chart performance of Die Ärzte
Chart (2020)	Peak position
German Albums (Offizielle Top 100)	7
