= Die Ärzte =

German rock band

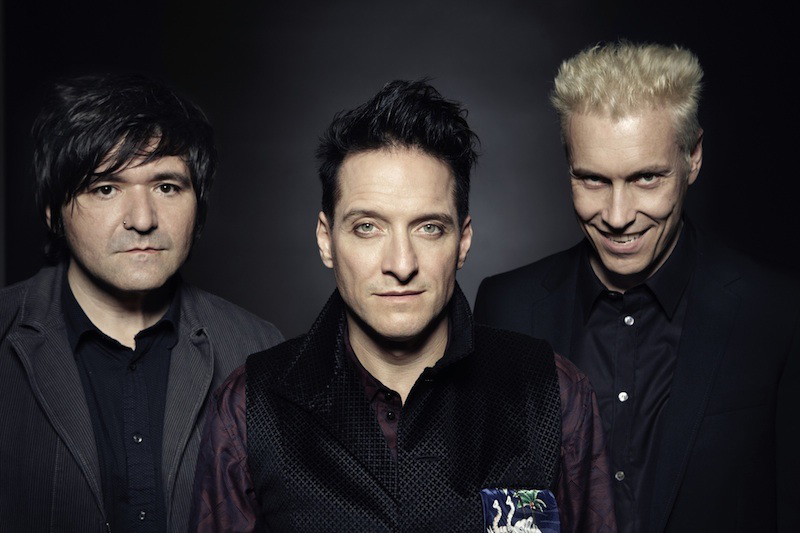
- L-R: Rodrigo González, Bela B, Farin Urlaub (2012)

Background information
- Also known as: Laternen-Joe
- Origin: (West) Berlin, (West) Germany
- Genres: Punk rock; pop punk; alternative rock; ska punk; pop rock
- Years active: 1982–1988, 1993–present
- Labels: Vielklang Musikproduktion; CBS (Columbia); Metronome; Hot Action/Universal
- Spinoff of: Soilent Grün
- Members: Farin Urlaub; Bela B; Rodrigo González
- Past members: Hans Runge ("Sahnie"); Hagen Liebing ("The Incredible Hagen")
- Website: bademeister.com

Die Ärzte (German pronunciation: [diː ˈʔɛːɐ̯tstə]; lit. 'The Doctors') is a German rock band from Berlin. It consists of guitarist Farin Urlaub, drummer Bela B and bass player Rodrigo González. All three write and perform their songs. The band has released 14 studio albums.

== Early life ==
=== 1982–1985: Early years, debut album ===
Die Ärzte were formed in West Berlin in 1982 by Jan Vetter (alias Farin Urlaub, a pun on the expression "Fahr' in Urlaub", meaning "Go on vacation"), Dirk Felsenheimer (alias Bela B, referring to Dracula actor Bela Lugosi) and bassist Hans Runge, alias Sahnie. Bela and Farin had previously played together in the punk band Soilent Grün, established in 1979 and named after the film Soylent Green.

After Soilent Grün broke up in 1982, Bela and Farin decided to form another band. In the first two years (including Sahnie) they mostly played in clubs in their hometown, Berlin. Their first release was a contribution to the sampler 20 schäumende Stimmungshits (rough translation: "20 foamy party hits"), featuring a strong alcohol theme (for example, the chorus of "Vollmilch" translates as "you drink whiskey, he drinks beer, I drink milk"). In 1983 they won a rock contest in Berlin and with the prize money they recorded their debut EP Uns geht's prima... ("We're doing great..."). Finally CBS signed them, and they released their first LP Debil ("Moronic") with their second LP following in 1984 with Im Schatten der Ärzte ("In the shadow of Die Ärzte") a year later.

=== 1986–1989: Success, controversies, line-up change, breakup ===
After the second album, they parted ways with Sahnie due to internal problems. Producer Manfred 'Manne' Praeker played the bass parts on the third album. Later, Hagen Liebing ("The Incredible Hagen") took over as bassist for live concerts, although he never became an official member of the band, with Farin playing bass on the following albums. The third album was also the first time that Farin used distorted guitar sounds on most of the album, moving the band's sound towards rock. In 1987, the German Federal Centre for Media Harmful to Young Persons put the songs "Geschwisterliebe" ("Sibling love", a song about incest, from the album Die Ärzte), "Claudia hat 'nen Schäferhund" ("Claudia has a German Shepherd", about zoophilia, from Debil) and "Schlaflied" ("Lullaby", about a monster coming and eating its victim after falling asleep, also from Debil) on the German List of Media Harmful to Young People (often called "the Index"). This prohibited the band from performing the songs live or promoting the two albums and, more importantly, shops were prohibited from openly displaying these records or selling them to minors. At their concerts, they circumvented the ban by playing only the music of the prohibited songs, while the audience sang the lyrics. After several trials against shops that still openly sold the records, a lot of shops completely removed Die Ärzte from their stock. The result was a drop in record sales and financial problems for the band. In response they released the best of album Ist das alles? ("Is that all?") with three new songs and the 10" compilation Ab 18 (Adults only) containing all indexed songs and some other songs with controversial, mainly sex-themed lyrics. Although advice not to sell the album to minors was printed on the cover, Ab 18 was also put on the index.

The inner sleeve was put on the index separately because it contained the lyrics. Some tour posters were considered misogynistic and were also put on the list. They contained a drawing of a tied up and gagged woman called Gwendoline that was inspired by bondage artist John Willie and is the mascot of the band. Since then, Die Ärzte have used a skeleton version of Gwendoline in the artwork of most of their albums. Later, from 2000 on, live shows have featured two oversized Gwendolines that flank the stage (especially at outdoor concerts). The commissioned artist had first colored the figures independently. However, after the Hard Pop Days were played with these colorful editions and a houseboat at Popkomm in Cologne was adorned with them, they were recolored into classic black and white design.

The following album Das ist nicht die ganze Wahrheit... ("That is not the whole truth...") was even more successful; it charted in the top 10 of the German album charts. Die Ärzte decided to go out on a high note and split up after doing one last tour and releasing a triple live album, Nach uns die Sintflut ("Devil may care", lit. "After us the deluge"), later released as a double CD, that became their first number one in the album charts.

In 1989, they released one last single from the Wahrheit LP and a compilation of early EPs and rare recordings (Die Ärzte früher! ("Die Ärzte earlier!").

=== 1993–1999: Reunion, new bassist, first no.1 single ===
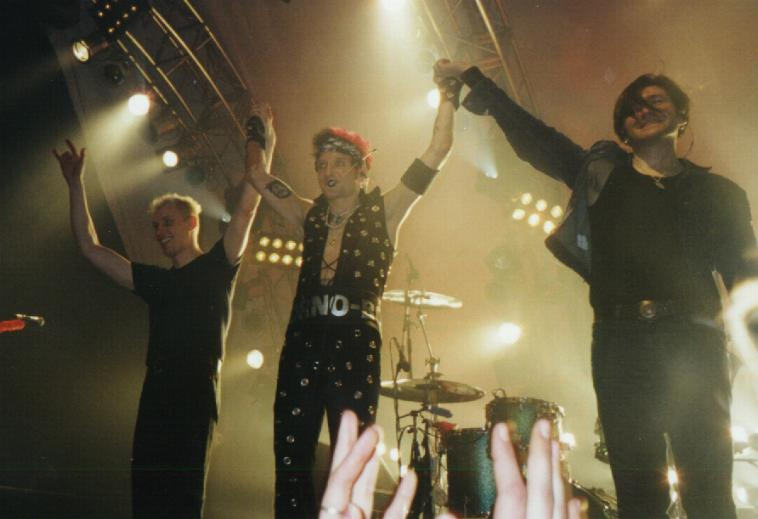
Die Ärzte in 1998

Neither Farin's new band King Køng nor Bela's Depp Jones became successful, so they decided to reform in 1993. They invited former Depp Jones guitarist Rodrigo González to take over on bass duties. He would also play guitar on songs he (co-)wrote. They released the comeback album Die Bestie in Menschengestalt ("The beast in human form") and the single "Schrei nach Liebe" ("Cry for love"), their first song to have political lyrics. It was recorded as a statement against the increasing racism and right-wing extremist violence in Germany at that time. The translation of the song's refrain is "Your violence is just a silent cry for love / Your combat boots are craving for tenderness / You never learned to express yourself / And your parents never had time for you / Oh oh oh asshole". The album was more varied than previous releases, including ballads, punk, rock and even a song resembling Volksmusik. Both the album and single became big hits in Germany, Austria and Switzerland. The follow-up Planet Punk was also very successful.

In 1996, they wanted to make an EP just about hair, however, they wrote too many songs for an EP and it became their next album, Le Frisur. It was not as successful as its predecessors. Also during this year, as well as touring in their own right, they also supported Kiss on the German dates of their Alive/Worldwide Tour — a dream come true for Bela and Rod. In 1998 their single "Männer sind Schweine" ("Men are pigs") became their first number 1 single in Germany, Austria and Switzerland, with the album 13 also being number 1 in Germany and Switzerland. After a lot of promotion and touring that year, they decided to take a break and also to never again play "Männer sind Schweine" during concerts, due in part to its huge chart success, which in turn attracted remakes, e.g. "Frauen sind Schweine" ("Women are pigs").

=== 2000–2013: Further success, MTV Unplugged, solo work ===
In 2000 they came back with the album, Runter mit den Spendierhosen, Unsichtbarer! ("Stop feeling so generous, invisible one!", lit.: "Down with the generosity trousers, invisible one!"), and two top 10 singles. For the third single from the album they released the 30-second-song Yoko Ono, which, according to the Guinness Book of Records, is the shortest single ever released (with a videoclip)—another example of their sense of humour. During their tour in 2001 they sold the limited edition album 5, 6, 7, 8 - Bullenstaat! ("5,6,7,8 – Cop State!") consisting of short punk songs that were written and recorded with the previous years full-length album published a year before, and with some cover songs that were published in 1995 (another tour only EP).

After that, they again took a break. During the break Bela did some acting and Farin recorded his first solo album Endlich Urlaub! ("Holiday at last!"). In late 2002, they did an MTV Unplugged session in a school auditorium with the school's band (Albert Schweitzer Gymnasium, Hamburg, Germany), which they released under the title Rock'n'Roll Realschule (in allusion to the Ramones' song and the film Rock 'n' Roll High School). The following year they released a new two-CD album, Geräusch ("Noise"). In December 2003 a live DVD was recorded and published the following year.

While the band was on another break, Farin released another solo album Am Ende der Sonne ("At the end of the Sun"). In 2005 a new version of the album Debil was released under the name Devil containing the original track listings plus some B-sides and previously unreleased bonus material. The album can now be sold legally, since all the tracks from the original LP have been removed from the Index. Only Geschwisterliebe remains there. In 2006, Bela B made a solo album, Bingo. On 2 November 2007, Die Ärzte released their latest album, Jazz ist anders ("Jazz is nothing like this", lit. "Jazz is different"), which was preceded by the single Junge ("Boy"). Junge was shown for the first time on MTV TRL Germany on 14 September 2007. The album was followed by two tours, in winter 2007 and summer 2008.

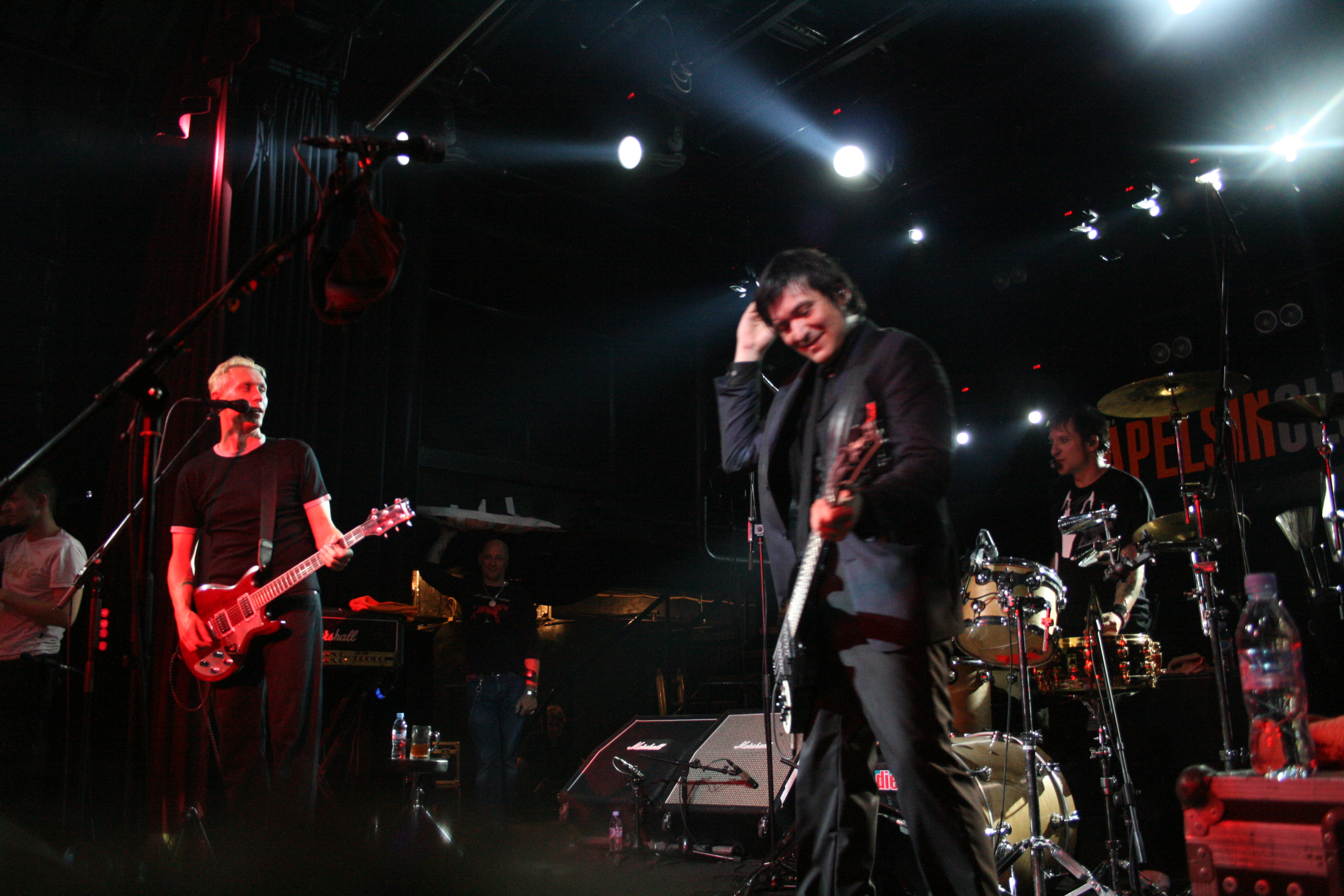
Die Ärzte performing in 2008

After they played a few concerts in 2009, they took a break. In April 2011, they toured under the pseudonym "Laternen-Joe" and, in December, they gave two special concerts at the Westfalenhalle in Dortmund, one only for women, and one only for men.

In 2012, Die Ärzte released their next record auch ("as well", "also"), preceded by the single "zeiDverschwÄndung" ("wÄste of time"). From May to August, as well as November and December in the same year, they went on two concert tours throughout Germany, Austria and Switzerland. Their concerts at the Festhalle Frankfurt and the Waldbühne Berlin were used for a live album and concert film called Die Nacht der Dämonen ("Night of the Demons"), which was released in 2013. In 2013 Die Ärzte also went on another concert tour, this time mainly playing large open air and stadium concerts.

=== Since 2013: hiatus, more albums, further touring ===
Die Ärzte made a surprise appearance playing Schrei nach Liebe at Jamel Rock den Förster in 2015, an antiracist and antifascist music festival in Jamel, a small village in Northeastern Germany that is mainly inhabited by Neo-Nazis, as well as two married artists, who organise the festival every year. In that same year, among rising anti-immigration tensions in Germany, their anti-Nazi song Schrei nach Liebe reached No.1 in the German charts, 22 years after its original release.

In 2016, their former bassist Hagen Liebing died, at age 55. In the same year, another biography, Das Buch Ä ("the book Ä"), was released, revealing the band had been on bad terms during the 2013 tour and was inactive afterwards (apart from the Jamel appearance). The three band members all released further solo work, however.

In June 2019, die Ärzte played headlining shows at the festivals Rock am Ring and Rock im Park in Germany, Nova Rock Festival in Austria, as well as Open Air St. Gallen in Switzerland. These shows were exclusive in their respective countries. Before these festivals, die Ärzte played a club tour in non-German speaking parts of Europe in May. These were their first full live shows since 2013.

In October 2020, die Ärzte released their first studio album in 8 years, Hell ("bright"). The tour that was meant to follow the album was first postponed into 2021 before being completely cancelled because of the COVID-19 pandemic. In 2021, die Ärzte then released another studio album, Dunkel ("dark"). They went on two concert tours in 2022, one regular stadium and open air tour, as well as a tour where they exclusively played in Berlin, where they went from small clubs that hold 150 people, over medium-sized concert halls, up to the Tempelhofer Feld, where they played for 60 000 people on two days each (a third concert had to be cancelled on the day due to a thunderstorm). This tour was designed to help the local Berlin venues after the pandemic.

In 2023, they played a further tour, announced only a week before it started (and sold out within minutes), and announced two further concerts at Tempelhofer Feld for 2024.

=== Relationship with Die Toten Hosen ===
Throughout their career, Die Ärzte have often been compared to fellow German punk band Die Toten Hosen; a comparison that has often been stylized as a rivalry by the media despite both bands never having an official feud. The comparisons are mostly drawn because of a similar origin as both bands were pioneers of the German punk rock scene and started around the same time in the early 1980s, in both cases evolving from earlier locally famous punk bands (Die Ärzte from Soilent Grün and Die Toten Hosen from ZK). Furthermore, both bands are heavily linked to their cities of origin: Die Ärzte from Berlin and Die Toten Hosen from Düsseldorf. While Die Ärzte are generally known for their more humorous approach to music, Die Toten Hosen also have a couple of humorous songs, mostly about alcohol. Both bands enjoyed a similar career trajectory and success (with the most notable difference being the 5-year hiatus of Die Ärzte). Due to all of these similarities, multiple media outlets in Germany tried to establish a Beatles/Stones-style rivalry between both bands. While both bands admit to a certain level of competition and rivalry between them in the past, including a physical altercations in the early 80s, both bands are amicable towards each other today, if not poking fun at said "rivalry".

Adopting aliases Die Ärzte and Die Toten Hosen have played small club shows together in the past. In 2012 Die Toten Hosen covered Die Ärzte's Schrei nach Liebe on the bonus disc for their album Ballast der Republik. The same year, they covered the song while headlining Germany's biggest rock festival Rock am Ring and have continued playing the songs live on multiple occasions. In the music video for die Ärzte's "Noise" , as Bela B, Die Toten Hosen drummer Vom Ritchie makes an appearance playing drums with a Toten Hosen banner behind him, before being chased out by the band.

In June 2022 Die Ärzte appeared at one of the 40th anniversary concerts Die Toten Hosen gave in Düsseldorf. They first performed two Die Toten Hosen songs on their own, before being joined by Die Toten Hosen for Schrei nach Liebe and Blitzkrieg Bop.

== Band name ==
Band logo (ä with three dots)

Band emblem (ä with three dots)

The band name "Die Ärzte" was decided upon after Farin Urlaub and Bela B noticed that the folder with the umlaut "Ä" was empty in most record stores. Since their 2003 album Geräusch, they have stylized their name with three dots over the ä in ärzte, intended as a play on the heavy metal umlaut. While the A with triple-dot diacritic does not represent any real language construct, it can be represented in Unicode as "A⃛" using the combining character U+20DB COMBINING THREE DOTS ABOVE.

The three dots also symbolize the three members of the band. The German cartoonist Schwarwel, who also directed music videos for famous pop punk bands including Good Charlotte and Unwritten Law, realized the idea. "Die Ärzte", with two dots, is correct German orthography and not related to the heavy metal umlaut in any way. They often call themselves "Die beste Band der Welt" ("The best band in the world") in jest due to them wondering why they have so many fans. They often change their band name for short periods, sometimes only a matter of days. For example, they called themselves "Die Köche" ("The cooks") to promote their 2007 album Jazz ist anders ("Jazz is different"), relevant due to the album art's pizza theme. By adopting new names, the band is able to avoid attracting large crowds, allowing them to hold small concerts.

== International reception ==
The band has been very popular in Germany, Austria and Switzerland, while also enjoying some success in other Northern European countries. Unlike fellow early 1980s German punk band Die Toten Hosen (whose career has often been compared to Die Ärzte, often trying to promote a rivalry), Die Ärzte are largely unknown outside of these countries, aside from descendants of German nationals abroad as well as many students. The band considered releasing an album in English in the mid-1990s, but they dropped the idea. The songs recorded for said album were released in 2018 on the compilations "Seitenhirsch" and "They've given me Schrott".

In 2002, they did a short tour in Japan and released a compilation (titled simply die ärzte) of their last albums there, and in 2004 they did a short tour in South America.

On occasion (for example concerts in 2008, 2019, 2023), they also played non-German-speaking countries of Europe, such as Poland, Czechia, Croatia, Slovenia, Italy, France, the UK, Sweden, Denmark, Luxembourg, Russia, the Netherlands and Belgium.

== Band members ==
- Farin Urlaub (Jan Vetter) – vocals, guitar, bass (1982–1988, 1993–present)
- Bela B (Dirk Felsenheimer) – vocals, drums, guitar (1982–1988, 1993–present)
- Rodrigo "Rod" González – vocals, bass, guitar, keyboards (1993–present)

Former members

- Hans Runge ("Sahnie") – vocals, bass (1982–1986)
- Hagen Liebing ("The Incredible Hagen") – bass, backing vocals (1986–1988; died 2016)

Timeline

== Discography ==
Studio albums

- Debil (1984)
- Im Schatten der Ärzte (1985)
- Die Ärzte (1986)
- Das ist nicht die ganze Wahrheit... (1988)
- Die Bestie in Menschengestalt (1993)
- Planet Punk (1995)
- Le Frisur (1996)
- 13 (1998)
- Runter mit den Spendierhosen, Unsichtbarer! (2000)
- 5, 6, 7, 8 – Bullenstaat! (2001)
- Geräusch (2003)
- Jazz ist anders (2007)
- auch (2012)
- Hell (2020)
- Dunkel (2021)

== Literature ==
Title	Year	Author	Publisher
Die Ärzte Fanbook	1997	Thomas Kallweit	Falken Verlag
Die Ärzte: früher, jetze & morgen	1998	Peter Wagner	Ideal Verlag
Im Angesicht des Schattenreichs von Die Ärzte	1998	Frans Stummer, Georg F.W. Tempel	Ehapa
Die kleinste Band der Welt	2000	?	–
Rote Gourmet Fraktion – Kochen für Rockstars	2001	Ole Plogstedt, Jörg Raufeisen, Hollow Skai	Kiepenheuer & Witsch
Die Ärzte. Auf den Spuren der Kult-Band zwischen Charts und Provokation	2001	Murielle Martin	Dirk Lehrach Verlag
Geschichten aus der DIE ÄRZTE #1: Angriff der Fett-Teenager	2001	Schwarwel, THC Reichl	Extrem Erfolgreich Enterprises (EEE)
Ein überdimensionales Meerschwein frisst die Erde auf	2001	Markus Karg	Schwarzkopf & Schwarzkopf
Meine Jahre mit "Die Ärzte"	2003	Hagen Liebing	Schwarzkopf & Schwarzkopf
Die Ärzte Songbook	2004	–	Bosworth Musikverlag
Die Ärzte Notenfreund	2005	–	Bosworth Musikverlag
Bäst of Songbook: Guitar; Drum kit; Bass guitar	2007/2008	–	Bosworth Musikverlag
Rockterrine: So schmeckt Rock'n'Roll!	2008	Jens Nink	Rockbuch Verlag – ein Imprint der edel entertainment GmbH
Die Ärzte Songbook für Ukulele	2013	–	Bosworth Musikverlag
Das Buch Ä	2016	Stefan Üblacker	Schwarzkopf & Schwarzkopf
Nackt im Wind: Die Berlin-Tour MMXXII	2023	Jörg Steinmetz	Prestel Verlag

== Awards ==
Year	Presenter	Awards	Result
1988	Bravo Otto	Rock-Gruppe in Gold	Won
1995	Bravo Otto	Band Rock in Silber	Won
1995	Echo	Gruppe des Jahres national	Nominated
1996	Comet	Video National – Rod Loves You	Won
1996	Bravo Otto	Band Rock in Bronze	Won
1996	Echo	Gruppe des Jahres national	Nominated
1996	Echo	Erfolgreichste nationaler Song des Jahres: Ein Song namens Schunder	Nominated
1997	Echo	Nationaler Newcomer des Jahres – Rod Loves You	Nominated
1998	Bravo Otto	Band Rock in Bronze	Won
1999	Echo	Musikvideo des Jahres national: Männer sind Schweine	Nominated
1999	Echo	Gruppe des Jahres national: 13	Nominated
1999	Echo	Erfolgreichster nationaler Song des Jahres: Männer sind Schweine	Nominated
2001	Echo	Videoclip national: Manchmal haben Frauen...	Won
2001	Comet	Beste Rockband	Nominated
2001	Comet	Act national	Nominated
2001	Comet	VIVA ZWEI Zuschauercomet	Nominated
2001	Comet	Video national: Manchmal haben Frauen...	Nominated
2003	MTV Europe Music Awards	Bester deutscher Act	Won
2004	Comet	Bestes Video: Unrockbar	Nominated
2005	Echo	Musik-DVD-Produktion national/international: Die Band, die sie Pferd nannten	Won
2005	Echo	Bester Live-Act	Nominated
2007	1Live Krone	Lebenswerk	Won
2008	World Music Award	World's Best Selling German Artist	Won
2008	1Live Krone	Beste Single: Junge	Won
2008	Echo	Gruppe des Jahres – Rock/Alternative National	Won
2008	Comet	Album des Jahres: Jazz ist anders	Nominated
2008	Comet	Bester Live Act	Nominated
2008	MTV Europe Music Awards	Bester deutscher Act	Nominated
2009	Echo	Bester Rock/Alternative/Heavy Metal national: Jazz ist anders	Won
2009	Comet	Bester Song: Lasse redn	Nominated
2009	Comet	Bester Liveact	Nominated
2014	Echo	Erfolgreichste Musik-DVD-Produktion (national): Live – Die Nacht der Dämonen	Won
