= List of songs recorded by Die Ärzte =

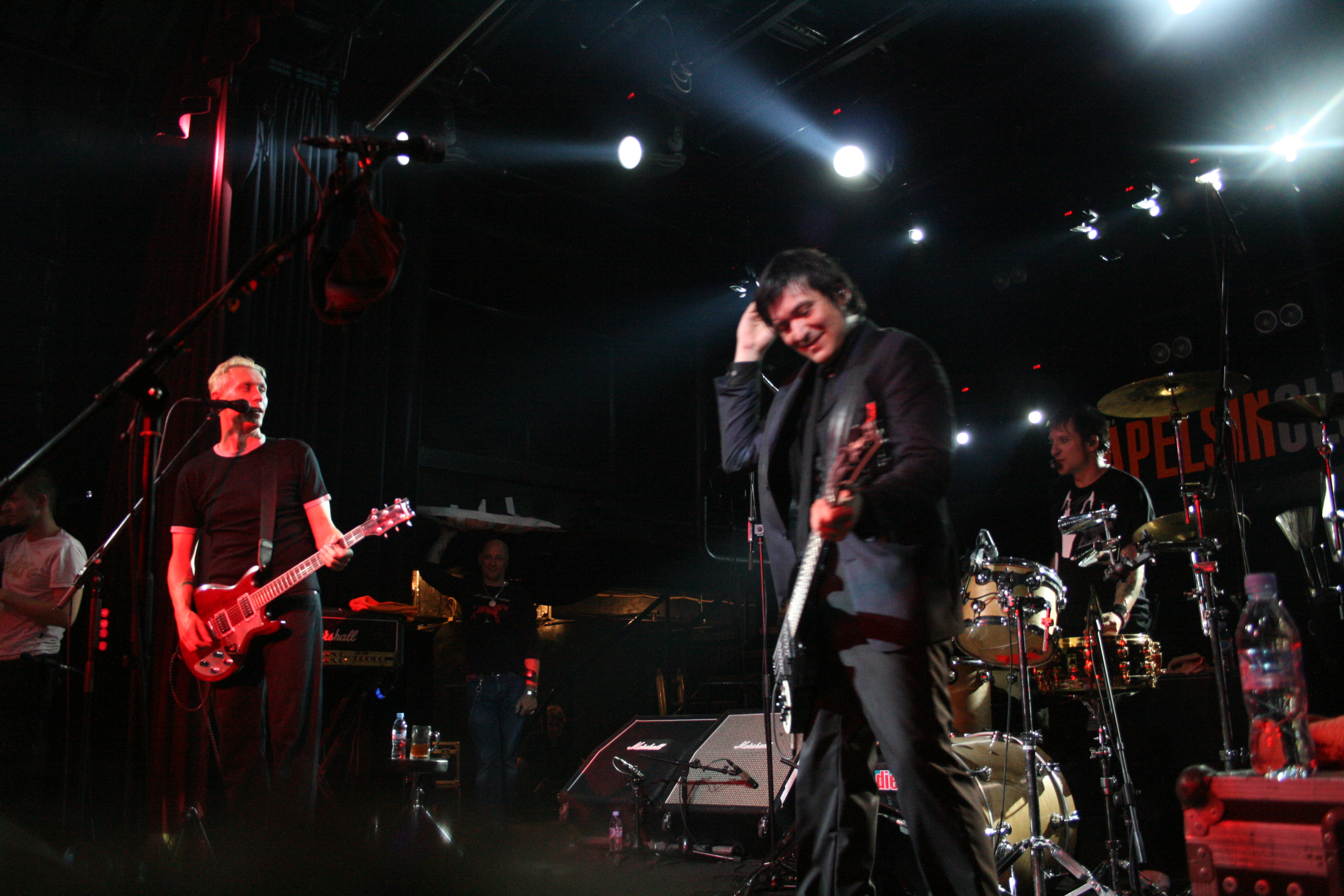
Die Ärzte performing in 2008

The following is a complete list of songs recorded or played live by the German rock band Die Ärzte, as well as Farin Urlaub, the Farin Urlaub Racing Team, and musician Bela B.

== Die Ärzte songs ==
=== Released songs ===
| Title | Translation | Re-leased | Album | Length | Written by |
|---|---|---|---|---|---|
| "'Tschuldigung Bier" | "Sorry, beer" | 2001 | "5, 6, 7, 8 - Bullenstaat!" | 1:21 | Lyrics:Felsenheimer Music:Felsenheimer/González/Urlaub |
| "... Liebe" (instrumental) | "... Love" | 1987 | "Gehn wie ein Ägypter" (single) | 4:00 | Lyrics+Music:Urlaub |
| "... Und es regnet" | "... and it's raining" | 1985 | "Im Schatten der Ärzte" | 3:15 | L+M:Felsenheimer/Runge/Urlaub |
| "1/2 Lovesong" | | 1998 | "13" | 3:52 | L:Felsenheimer/González M:González |
| "12 X U (Lest die Pravda)" | "12 X U (Read "Pravda")" | 2001 | "5, 6, 7, 8 - Bullenstaat!" | 1:18 | L+M:Gilbert/Lewis/Newman/Gotobed from Wire (band) |
| "2000 Mädchen" [Wumme-Mix] | "2000 girls" | 1987 | "Ist das alles? (13 Höhepunkte mit den Ärzten)" | 3:31 [5:55] | L+M:Urlaub |
| "25 Stunden am Tag" | "25 hours per day" | 1993 | "Mach die Augen zu" | 3:13 | L+M:Martin Witte |
| "3-Tage-Bart" | "Stubble", lit. "3-day beard" | 1996 | "Le Frisur" | 3:03 | L+M:Urlaub |
| "A-Moll" | "A-minor" | 2001 | "5, 6, 7, 8 - Bullenstaat!" | 0:30 | L:Urlaub M:Felsenheimer/González/Urlaub |
| "Abschied" | "Farewell" | 2019 | "Drei Mann - Zwei Songs" (single) | | |
| "Achtung: Bielefeld" | "Attention: Bielefeld" | 2020 | "Hell" | 3:34 | |
| "Alle auf Brille" | "Everyone on glasses" | 2020 | "Hell" | 3:29 | |
| "Allein" [Economy] | "Alone" | 2007 | "Jazz ist anders" ["Jazz ist anders (Economy)"] | 3:50 [3:29] | L+M:Urlaub |
| "Alleine in der Nacht" | "Alone in the night" | 1986 | "Die Ärzte" | 2:47 | L+M:Felsenheimer |
| "Alles für dich" | "Everything for you" | 1999 | "Rebell" (single) | 4:11 | L+M:Urlaub |
| "Alles so einfach" | "All so simple" | 2000 | "Runter mit den Spendierhosen, Unsichtbarer! | 4:25 | L+M:Urlaub |
| "Alles" | "Everything" | 1985 | "Im Schatten der Ärzte | 2:55 | L:Felsenheimer/Urlaub M:Felsenheimer |
| "Als ich den Punk erfand..." | "When I invented punk..." | 2003 | "Geräusch" | 1:53 | L+M:Felsenheimer/Urlaub |
| "Am Ende meines Körpers" | "At the end of my body" | 1996 | "Le Frisur" | 2:46 | L+M:Urlaub |
| "Anders als beim lezten Mal" | "Different from last time" | 2003 | "Geräusch" | 4:17 | L+M:Urlaub |
| "Angeber" | "Show-off" | 1998 | "13" | 2:58 | L+M:Urlaub |
| "Angekumpelt" | "Mated" | 2012 | "Auch" | 2:32 | L:González/Urlaub M:González |
| "Angriff der Fett-Teenager" | "Attack of the fat teenagers" | 2018 | "Seitenhirsch" | | |
| "Anneliese Schmidt" [Analyzer Smith] | | 1983 [1994] | "Zu schön, um wahr zu sein!" (EP) ["Quark" (single)] | 3:11 [3:54] | L+M:Urlaub |
| "Anti-Zombie" | | 2003 | "Geräusch" | 4:09 | L:González M:Blitz/González |
| "Attack of the Fat Teenagers" | | 2018 | "Seitenhirsch" | | |
| "Aus dem Tagebuch eines Amokläufers" | "From the diary of an amok-runner" | 2003 | "Unrockbar" (single) | 2:37 | L+M:Urlaub |
| "Außerirdische" | "Aliens" | 1988 | "Das ist nicht die ganze Wahrheit..." | 2:45 | L+M:Urlaub |
| "B.S.L." (Brutal schneller Lärm) | "B.S.L." (Brutally rapid noise) | 1995 | "Planet Punk" | 2:35 | L+M:Urlaub |
| "Baby ich tu's" | "Baby, I'll do it" | 1988 | "Das ist nicht die ganze Wahrheit..." | 3:00 | L+M:Felsenheimer |
| "Baby" | | 2000 | "Runter mit den Spendierhosen, Unsichtbarer! | 4:32 | L+M:Urlaub |
| "Backpfeifengesicht" | "Bitch-slap face" | 1999 | "Rebell" (single) | 2:24 | L+M:Urlaub |
| "Bang Bang (instrumental)" | | 2018 | "Seitenhirsch" | | |
| "Besserwisserboy" | "Know-it-all boy" | 2003 | "Geräusch" | 3:41 | L+M:Urlaub |
| "Bettmagnet" | "Bed magnet" | 2012 | "Auch" | 3:08 | L+M:Felsenheimer |
| "BGS" (Bundesgrenzschutz) | "BGS" (Federal Border Guard) | 2001 | "5, 6, 7, 8 - Bullenstaat!" | 1:03 | L+M:Stephane Larsson from Buttocks (band) |
| "Biergourmut" | "Beer gourmet" | 2004 | "Deine Schuld" (single) | 1:56 | L:Felsenheimer M:Die Ärzte |
| "Bingo Lady 2.0" | | 2018 | "Seitenhirsch" | | |
| "Bitte bitte" [Domina-Mix] [CBS Mix] | "Please please" | 1988 | "Das ist nicht die ganze Wahrheit..." ["Bitte bitte Maxi" (single)] | 3:17 [7:35] [6:06] | L+M:Urlaub |
| "Bravopunks" | | 2001 | "5, 6, 7, 8 - Bullenstaat!" | 1:15 | L:Felsenheimer M:Felsenheimer/González/Urlaub |
| "Breit" [Economy] | "Stoned" (lit. "wide") | 2007 | "Jazz ist anders" ["Jazz ist anders (Economy)"] | 3:14 [1:49] | L:González/Urlaub M:González |
| "Brigitte" | | 2018 | "Seitenhirsch" | | |
| "Buddy Holly's Brille" | "Buddy Holly's glasses" | 1985 | "Im Schatten der Ärzte" | 3:33 | L+M:Urlaub |
| "Bullenschwein" | "Cop pig" | 2001 | "5, 6, 7, 8 - Bullenstaat!" | 0:06 | L:Felsenheimer M:Felsenheimer/González/Urlaub |
| "Chanson d'Albert" (English version of "Schunder-Song") | "Albert's song" (French) | 1996 | "3-Tage-Bart" (single) | 3:11 | L:Urlaub M:Felsenheimer/Urlaub |
| "Chile 3" | | 2001 | "5, 6, 7, 8 - Bullenstaat!" | 0:41 | L+M:González |
| "Claudia (Teil 95)" | "Claudia (part 95)" | 1994 | "Die Bestie in Menschengestalt" | 0:09 | L+M:Felsenheimer/González/Urlaub |
| "Claudia hat 'nen Schäferhund" | "Claudia has a German shepherd" | 1984 | "Debil" | 1:58 | L+M:Urlaub |
| "Claudia II" | | 1987 | "Ab 18" | 2:30 | L+M:Urlaub |
| "Claudia III" | | 1987 | "Ab 18" | 4:58 | L+M:Felsenheimer/Liebing/Urlaub |
| "Close Your Eyes Again" | | 2018 | "Seitenhirsch" | | |
| "Clown aus dem Hospiz" | "Clown from the hospice" | 2020 | "Hell" | 3:05 | |
| "Cops Underwater" | | 2001 | "5, 6, 7, 8 - Bullenstaat!" | 1:32 | L:Urlaub M:Felsenheimer/González/Urlaub |
| "Cpt. Metal" | | 2012 | "Auch" | 4:37 | L+M:Urlaub |
| "Danke für jeden guten Morgen" | "Thank you for each good morning" | 1998 | "1/2 Lovesong" (single) | 2:43 | L+M:Martin Gotthard Schneider |
| "Das darfst du" | "You are allowed" | 2012 | "Auch" | 3:19 | L+M:Felsenheimer |
| "Das finde ich gut" | "I think that's good" | 2012 | "Auch" | 2:29 | L+M:González |
| "Das ist Rock'n'Roll" | "That's rock'n'roll" | 1988 | "Ich ess' Blumen" (single) | 3:00 | L:Urlaub/Felsenheimer/Liebing M:Urlaub/Felsenheimer |
| "Das letzte Lied des Sommers" | "The last song of summer" | 2020 | "Hell" | 3:20 | |
| "Das schönste Lied der Welt" [Economy] | "The most beautiful song in the world" | 2007 [2008] | "Junge" (single) ["Lasse redn" (single)] | 2:36 [2:22] | L+M:Felsenheimer |
| "Dauerwelle vs. Minipli" | "Permanent wave vs. minipli" | 1996 | "Le Frisur" | 0:53 | L:Urlaub M:Felsenheimer/González |
| "Dein Vampyr" [Remix] | "Your vampyre" | 1985 [1987] | "Im Schatten der Ärzte" ["Ist das alles? (13 Höhepunkte mit den Ärzten)"] | 3:20 [3:09] | L+M:Felsenheimer |
| "Deine Freundin (wäre mir zu anstrengend)" [Economy] | "Your girlfriend (would be too strenuous for me)" | 2007 | "Jazz ist anders" ["Jazz ist anders (Economy)"] | 2:13 [2:24] | L+M:Urlaub |
| "Deine Schuld" | "Your fault" | 2003 | "Geräusch" | 3:35 | L+M:Urlaub |
| "Der Afro von Paul Breitner" | "The afro of Paul Breitner" | 1996 | "Le Frisur" | 1:59 | L:Urlaub M:Felsenheimer/González |
| "Der Graf" | "The Count" | 1998 | "13" | 3:44 | L+M:Felsenheimer |
| "Der Grund" | "The reason" | 2003 | "Geräusch" | 2:54 | L+M:Felsenheimer |
| "Der Infant" | "The infant" | 1998 | "13" | 3:05 | L+M:Felsenheimer |
| "Der lustige Astronaut" | "The jolly astronaut" | 1984 | "Uns geht's prima..." | 2:29 | L+M:Urlaub |
| "Der Misanthrop" | "The misanthrope" | 1995 | "Planet Punk" | 3:22 | L+M:Urlaub |
| "Der Optimist" | "The optimist" | 2000 | "Runter mit den Spendierhosen, Unsichtbarer!" | 2:36 | L+M:Felsenheimer |
| "Der Tag" | "The day" | 2003 | "Geräusch" | 2:48 | L+M:Urlaub |
| "Deutschland verdrecke" | "Germany dirty" | 2001 | "5, 6, 7, 8 - Bullenstaat!" | 0:33 | L:Felsenheimer M:Felsenheimer/González/Urlaub |
| "Deutschrockgirl" | "German rock girl" | 1993 | "Die Bestie in Menschengestalt" | 1:53 | L:Felsenheimer/Urlaub M:Felsenheimer |
| "Die Allerschürfste" | "The Superhoottest" (in the Berlin dialect) | 1993 | "Die Bestie in Menschengestalt" | 3:24 | L+M:Urlaub |
| "Die Antwort bist du" | "The answer is you" | 1986 | "Du willst mich küssen" (single) | 3:17 | L+M:Felsenheimer |
| "Dumme Sache" | "Stupid thing" | 2018 | "Seitenhirsch" | | |
| "E.V.J.M.F." | | 2020 | "Hell" | 1:43 | |
| "Die Banane" ["Die Banane (unplugged)"] | "The Banana" | 1995 [2002] | "Planet Punk" ["Rock'n'Roll Realschule"] | 4:33 [4:59] | L:Felsenheimer M:Felsenheimer/González |
| "Die Einsamkeit des Würstchens" | "Loneliness of the sausage" | 1989 | "Die Ärzte früher!" | 1:32 | L+M:Felsenheimer/Urlaub |
| "Die ewige Maitresse" [Economy] | "The eternal maitresse" | 2007 | "Jazz ist anders" ["Jazz ist anders (Economy)"] | 2:24 [2:47] | L+M:Felsenheimer/González |
| "Die Hard" | | 2012 | "Auch" | 2:19 | L+M:González |
| "Die Instrumentale des Orchesters" | "The Instruments of the Orchestra" | 2000 | "Wie es geht" (single) | 2:36 | L+M:Urlaub |
| "Die klügsten Männer der Welt" | "The wisest men in the world" | 2003 | "Geräusch" | 3:58 | L+M:Felsenheimer |
| "Die Nacht" | "The Night" | 2003 | "Geräusch" | 5:02 | L+M:Felsenheimer |
| "Die traurige Ballade von Susi Spakowski" | "The sad ballad of Susi Spakowski" | 1995 | "Planet Punk" | 4:01 | L+M:Felsenheimer |
| "Die Wahrheit über Mädchen" | "The truth about girls" | 2018 | "Seitenhirsch" | | |
| "Die Welt ist schlecht" | "The world is bad" | 2001 | "Yoko Ono" (single) | 3:40 | L:Felsenheimer M:Felsenheimer/Urlaub |
| "Die Wikingjugend hat mein Mädchen entführt" | "The KKK Took My Baby Away" | 1994 | "Friedenspanzer" (single) | 2:28 | L:Felsenheimer M:The Ramones |
| "Die Ärzte" | "The Doctors" | 2002 | "Wenn kaputt dann wir Spass" (sampler) | 2:56 | |
| "Dinge von denen" | "Things of which" | 2003 | "Geräusch" | 3:57 | L:González/Blitz M:González |
| "Dir" | "To you" | 2000 | "Runter mit den Spendierhosen, Unsichtbarer!" | 3:39 | L+M:Felsenheimer |
| "Dos Corazones" | "Two Hearts" (Spanish) | 1993 | "Die Bestie in Menschengestalt" | 3:47 | L+M:González |
| "Du bist nicht mein Freund" | "You are not my friend" | 1998 | "Ein Schwein namens Männer" (single) | 1:38 | L+M:Felsenheimer |
| "Du und ich und Walter" | "You and me and Walter" | 2018 | "Seitenhirsch" | | |
| "Du willst mich küssen" ["Modern-Kissing-Mix"] ["Disco-Kuschel-Mix"] | "You want to kiss me" | 1985 | "Im Schatten der Ärzte" ["Du willst mich küssen (Modern-Kissing-Mix)" (single)] | 3:08 | L+M:Urlaub |
| "Eine Frage der Ehre" | "A question of honour" | 1995 | "Hurra" (single) | 3:50 | L+M:González |
| "Einmal ein Bier" | "One beer please" | 2020 | "Hell" | 1:59 | |
| "Ein Lächeln (für jeden Tag deines Lebens)" | "A smile (for every day of your life)" | 1998 | "Ein Schwein namens Männer" (single) | 4:21 | L+M:Felsenheimer/González/Urlaub |
| "Ein Mann mit Gipsbein" | "A man with a leg in plaster" | 2018 | "Seitenhirsch" | | |
| "Ein Lied für dich" | "A song for you" | 1998 | "13" | 3:43 | L+M:Urlaub |
| "Ein Lied für Jetzt" | "A song for now" | 2020 | "Ein Lied für Jetzt" (single) | 4:15 | L+M:Felsenheimer |
| "Ein Lied über Zensur" | "A song about censorship" | 1998 | "1/2 Lovesong" (single) | 3:20 | L:Felsenheimer/Urlaub M:Urlaub |
| "Ein Mann" | "A man" | 2003 | "Geräusch" | 2:18 | L+M:Urlaub |
| "Ein Sommer nur für mich" | "A summer just for me" | 2000 | "Runter mit den Spendierhosen, Unsichtbarer!" | 2:51 | L+M:Urlaub |
| "Ekelpack" ["Ich hab' Udo Lindenberg die Beine amputiert"] | "Disgusting pack" [I amputated Udo Lindenberg's leg] | 1989 [1983] | "Die Ärzte früher!" ["Pesthauch des Dschungels" (compilation)] | 2:04 | L:Urlaub/Felsenheimer M:Urlaub/Felsenheimer |
| "El Cattivo" [1987 Bad Boy-Mix] | "The Bad" (Italian) | 1984 [1987] | "Debil" ["Ist das alles? (13 Höhepunkte mit den Ärzten)"] | 3:12 [3:13] | L+M:Urlaub |
| "Elke" ["Elke (live)"] | | 1988 [1999] | "Das ist nicht die ganze Wahrheit..." ["Wir wollen nur deine Seele"] | 3:22 [6:46] | L+M:Urlaub |
| "Endstück des Eros" | "Tail of Eros", lit. "End piece of Eros" | 2012 | "M&F" (single) | 2:23 | ? |
| "Erklärung" | "Declaration" | 1996 | "Le Frisur" | 0:55 | L:Felsenheimer M:Felsenheimer/González/Urlaub |
| "Erna P." | | 1984 | "Paul" (single) | 2:26 | L+M:Urlaub |
| "Eva Braun" | | 2018 | "Seitenhirsch" | | L:Felsenheimer/Urlaub M:Runge |
| "Ewige Blumenkraft" | "Eternal flower power" | 1986 | "Für immer" (single) | 3:20 | L+M:Felsenheimer/Urlaub |
| "FaFaFa" | | 1993 | "Die Bestie in Menschengestalt" | 1:41 | L+M:Urlaub |
| "Felicita" | "Joy" (Italian) | 1993 | "Schrei nach Liebe" (single) | 0:52 | L:Minellono/Christiano M:De Stefanie/Gino/Farina/Dario |
| "Fexxo Cigol" | | 2020 | "Hell" | 3:45 | |
| "Fiasko" | | 2012 | "Auch" | 2:43 | L+M:Urlaub |
| "Frank'n'stein" | | 1984 | "Debil" | 2:38 | L+M:Felsenheimer |
| "Freundschaft ist Kunst" | "Friendship is art" | 2012 | "Auch" | 3:20 | L+M:Felsenheimer |
| "Friedenspanzer" | "Peace tank" | 1993 | "Die Bestie in Menschengestalt" | 3:56 | L+M:Felsenheimer/González |
| "Für immer" | "Forever" | 1986 | "Die Ärzte" | 3:46 | L+M:Urlaub |
| "Für uns" | "For us" | 1993 | "Die Bestie in Menschengestalt" | 4:42 | L+M:Felsenheimer |
| "Füße vom Tisch" | "Feet off the table" | 2005 | "Devil" | 2:24 | L+M:Felsenheimer/Urlaub |
| "Gabi & Uwe in: Liebe und Frieden" | "Gabi & Uwe in: Love and peace" | 1994 | "Das Beste von kurz nach früher bis jetze" (Original from "Moskito songs") | 3:22 | L+M:Felsenheimer/Urlaub |
| "Gabi ist pleite" | "Gabi is broke" | 1987 | "Radio brennt" (single) | 2:37 | L+M:Felsenheimer/Urlaub |
| "Gabi gibt 'ne Party" | "Gabi throws a party" | 1989 | "Bitte bitte" (single) (Original from "Moskito songs") | 3:10 | L+M:Felsenheimer/Urlaub |
| "Geboren zu verlieren" | "Born to lose" | 2001 | "5, 6, 7, 8 - Bullenstaat!" | 1:17 | L+M:Felsenheimer/Urlaub |
| "Geh mit mir" | "Date me" | 1995 | "Planet Punk" | 2:29 | L+M:Felsenheimer |
| "Gehirn-Stürm" | "Brain-störm" | 1993 | "Die Bestie in Menschengestalt" | 4:04 | L:Felsenheimer/González M:Felsenheimer |
| "Gehn wie ein Ägypter" | "Walk like an Egyptian" | 1987 | "Ist das alles? (13 Höhepunkte mit den Ärzten)" | 2:21 | L:Die Ärzte M:Liam Sternberg from The Bangles |
| "Geisterhaus" | "Ghost House" | 2003 | "Geräusch" | 3:49 | L:González M:González/Blitz |
| "Geld" | "Money" | 2000 | "Runter mit den Spendierhosen, Unsichtbarer!" | 3:44 | L+M:Felsenheimer |
| "Generation Ä" | | 2012 | "M&F" (single) | 2:20 | ? |
| "German Punks" | | 2018 | "Seitenhirsch" | | |
| "Geschwisterliebe" | "Sibling love" | 1986 | "Die Ärzte" | 4:11 | L+M:Urlaub |
| "Gib mir Zeit" | "Give me time" | 2000 | "Runter mit den Spendierhosen, Unsichtbarer!" | 2:08 | L+M:Urlaub |
| "Goldenes Handwerk" | "Golden handicraft" | 1998 | "13" | 2:43 | L+M:Felsenheimer |
| "Grace Kelly" | | 1983 | "Zu schön, um wahr zu sein!" | 2:19 | L+M:Urlaub |
| "Grau" | "Gray" | 1998 | "13" | 2:45 | L+M:Urlaub |
| "Grotesksong" | "Grotesque Song" | 1998 | "13" | 3:40 | L+M:Urlaub |
| "Gute Nacht" | "Good night" | 1989 | "Die Ärzte früher! – Der Ausverkauf geht weiter!" | 2:01 | L+M:Felsenheimer/Runge/Urlaub |
| "Gute Zeit" [Remix ´94] | "Good time" | 1988 [1994] | "Das ist nicht die ganze Wahrheit..." ["Das Beste von kurz nach früher bis jetze"] | 3:41 [4:26] | L+M:Felsenheimer |
| "Haar" [Vader Abraham Respect-Mix] | "Hair" | 1996 | "Le Frisur" ["3-Tage-Bart" (single)] | 4:07 [3:43] | L:Brandin M:MacDermot from the musical Hair |
| "Halsabschneider" | "Neckchopper" | 2000 | "Wie es geht" (single) | 1:28 | L+M:Urlaub |
| "Hass auf Bier" | "Hatred Towards Beer" | 2001 | "5, 6, 7, 8 - Bullenstaat!" | 0:40 | L:Felsenheimer/González/Urlaub M:Felsenheimer |
| "Hair Today, Gone Tomorrow" | | 1996 | "Le Frisur" | 2:54 | L+M:Felsenheimer |
| "Helmut K." | | 1987 | "Ab 18" | 2:34 | L+M:Felsenheimer/Liebing/Urlaub |
| "Herrliche Jahre" | "Splendid years" | 2000 | "Runter mit den Spendierhosen, Unsichtbarer!" | 3:52 | L+M:Urlaub |
| "Heulerei" [Economy] | "Crying/Whining" | 2007 | "Jazz ist anders" ["Jazz ist anders (Economy)"] | 3:50 [2:22] | L+M:Urlaub |
| "Hey Huh (in Scheiben)" | "Hey Huh (in Slices)" | 1993 | "Die Bestie in Menschengestalt" | 1:29 | L+M:Felsenheimer/Urlaub |
| "Himmelblau" [Economy] | "Sky Blue" | 2007 | "Jazz ist anders" ["Jazz ist anders (Economy)"] | 3:16 [3:28] | L+M:Urlaub |
| "Hurra" | "Hooray" | 1995 | "Planet Punk" | 3:26 | L+M:Urlaub |
| "Hände innen" | "Hands inside" | 2003 | "Geräusch" | 3:59 | L+M:Urlaub |
| "I hate Hitler" | | 2001 | "5, 6, 7, 8 - Bullenstaat!" | 0:41 | L+M:Stephane Larsson from "Buttocks" |
| "I Laugh If You Die" | | 2018 | "Seitenhirsch" | | |
| "Ich bin ein Punk" | "I am a punk" | 2001 | "5, 6, 7, 8 - Bullenstaat!" | 0:41 | L:Urlaub M:Felsenheimer/González/Urlaub |
| "Ich bin glücklich" | "I am happy" | 2001 | "5, 6, 7, 8 - Bullenstaat!" | 1:15 | L+M:Urlaub |
| "Ich bin reich" | "I am rich" | 1986 | "Die Ärzte" | 4:22 | L:Felsenheimer/Urlaub M:Urlaub |
| "Ich bin wild" | "I'm wild" | 1988 | "Live - Nach uns die Sintflut" | 3:34 | L:Urlaub M:Felsenheimer/Urlaub |
| "Ich ess' Blumen" also known as "Blumen" | "I eat flowers", "Flowers" | 1988 | "Das ist nicht die ganze Wahrheit..." | 3:44 | L+M:Felsenheimer |
| "Ich weiß nicht (ob es die Liebe ist)" | "I don't know (if it's love)" | 1985 | "Im Schatten der Ärzte" | 3:53 | L+M:Urlaub |
| "Ich will dich" | "I want you" | 1988 | "Das ist nicht die ganze Wahrheit..." | 2:18 | L+M:Felsenheimer |
| "Ich, am Strand" | "Me, on the beach" | 2020 | "Hell" | 4:22 | |
| "Ignorama" | | 1998 | "13" | 2:46 | L:Felsenheimer M:Felsenheimer/González |
| "Ihr Helden" | "You Heroes" | 2001 | "5, 6, 7, 8 - Bullenstaat!" | 1:25 | L+M:Peter Blümer from Hass (band) |
| "In den See! Mit einem Gewicht an den Füßen!" | "Into the lake! With a weight attached to the feet!" | 1996 | "3-Tage-Bart" (single) | 4:15 | L+M:González/Urlaub |
| "Is ja irre" | "That's so crazy" | 1995 | "Ein Song namens Schunder" (single) | 1:22 | L+M:Urlaub |
| "Ist das alles?" [Maxi Mix] [Remix '94] | "Is that all?" | 1986 [1986] [1994] | "Die Ärzte" ["Ist das alles? (Maxi)"] ["Das Beste von kurz nach früher bis jetze"] | 3:39 [5:33] [4:38] | L+M:Felsenheimer |
| "Ist das noch Punkrock?" | "Is this still punk rock?" | 2012 | "Auch" | 3:00 | L+M:Urlaub |
| "Ja (Demo)" | | 1993 | "Schrei nach Liebe" (single) | 2:38 | L+M:Urlaub |
| "Ja" | "Yes" | 2018 | "Seitenhirsch" | | |
| "Jag Älskar Sverige!" | "I love Sweden!" (Swedish) | 2003 | "Geräusch" | 3:40 | L+M:Urlaub |
| "Jenseits von Eden" | "Beyond Eden" | 1986 | "Die Ärzte" | 4:00 | L:Christopher Evans Ironside, Kurt Gebegern M:Christopher Evans Ironside, Kurt Gebegern, Joachim Horn-Bernges |
| "Junge" [Economy] | "Boy" | 2007 [2008] | "Jazz ist anders" ["Jazz ist anders (Economy)"] | 3:07 [3:09] | L+M:Urlaub |
| "Käfer" | "Beetle" | 1985 | "Im Schatten der Ärzte" | 2:48 | L+M:Urlaub |
| "Kamelrally" | "Camel ralley" | 1984 | "Debil" | 4:00 | L:Felsenheimer/Runge/Urlaub M:Runge |
| "Kann es sein?" | "Can it be?" | 2000 | "Runter mit den Spendierhosen, Unsichtbarer!" | 2:47 | L:Felsenheimer M:González |
| "Kaperfahrt" | "Caper ride" | 1996 | "Le Frisur" | 2:20 | L+M:Traditional |
| "Kein Problem" | "No problem" | 2001 | "5, 6, 7, 8 - Bullenstaat!" | 2:58 | L:Ernst August Wehmer M:Horst Illing from "Rotzkotz" |
| "Killing Joke" | | 2001 | "5, 6, 7, 8 - Bullenstaat!" | 1:08 | L+M:Felsenheimer/González/Urlaub |
| "Knäckebrot" | "crispbread | 2018 | "Seitenhirsch" | | |
| "Knüppelbullendub" | "Billy club cop dub" | 2001 | "5, 6, 7, 8 - Bullenstaat!" | 1:41 | L+M:Felsenheimer/González/Urlaub |
| "Komm zurück" ["Komm zurück (unplugged)"] | "Come back" | 1988 [2002] | "Das ist nicht die ganze Wahrheit..." ["Unplugged - Rock'n'Roll Realschule"] | 3:33 [3:29] | L+M:Urlaub |
| "Kontovollmacht..." | "Account authorization" | 2003 | "Unrockbar" (single) | 4:39 | L+M:Felsenheimer |
| "Komm zu Papa" | "Come to papa" | 2008 | "Lasse redn" (single) | 3:56 | L+M:Felsenheimer |
| "Kopfhaut" | "Scalp" | 1984 | "Uns geht's prima..." | 2:57 | L:Felsenheimer/Runge/Urlaub M:Urlaub |
| "Kopfüber in die Hölle/Revolution" [Remix '94] | "Headfirst into hell" | 1993 [1994] | "Die Bestie in Menschengestalt" ["Quark" (single)] | 2:54 [2:59] | L+M:Urlaub |
| "Kpt. Blaubär" | "Cpt. Bluebear" | 2000 | "Wie es geht" (single) | 4:17 | L+M:Felsenheimer/González/Urlaub |
| "Lady" | | 1998 | "13" | 3:55 | L:Felsenheimer/González M:González |
| "Langweilig" | "Boring" | 1995 | "Planet Punk" | 3:07 | L+M:Urlaub |
| "Las Vegas" | | 2000 | "Runter mit den Spendierhosen, Unsichtbarer!" | 1:49 | L+M:Felsenheimer |
| "Lasse redn" [Economy] | "Let 'em talk" | 2007 [2008] | "Jazz ist anders" ["Jazz ist anders (Economy)"] | 2:49 [3:14] | L+M:Urlaub |
| "Leben vor dem Tod" | "Life before death" | 2020 | "Hell" | 4:05 | |
| "Lohn der Lehre (Bela B Version)" | "Wages of teaching" | 2013 | "Waldspaziergang mit Folgen / Sohn der Leere" (Single) | 3:19 | L:Felsenheimer M:González |
| "Lovepower" | | 2003 | "Geräusch" | 2:32 | L:González/Blitz M:González |
| "Leichenhalle" | "Morgue" | 2000 | "Runter mit den Spendierhosen, Unsichtbarer!" | 3:51 | L:Felsenheimer/González/Urlaub M:González |
| "Let's Go Too Far" | | 2018 | "Seitenhirsch" | | |
| "Licht am Ende des Sarges" [Economy] | "Light at the end of the coffin" | 2007 [2008] | "Jazz ist anders" ["Jazz ist anders (Economy)"] | 2:47 [3:05] | L+M:Felsenheimer |
| "Liebe gegen Rechts" | "Love against the right wing" | 2020 | "Hell" | 2:21 | |
| "Liebe und Schmerz" | "Love and Sorrow" | 1998 | "13" | 3:52 | L+M:Felsenheimer |
| "Lieber Tee" | "Rather tea" | 1993 | "Die Bestie in Menschengestalt" | 4:47 | L+M:Urlaub |
| "Lied vom Scheitern" [Economy] | "Song about failing" | 2007 [2008] | "Jazz ist anders" ["Jazz ist anders (Economy)"] | 3:29 [3:44] | L+M:Felsenheimer |
| "Living Hell" [Economy] | | 2007 [2008] | "Jazz ist anders" ["Jazz ist anders (Economy)"] | 3:41 [5:05] | L+M:Urlaub |
| "Look, Don't Touch" | | 1986 | "Le Frisur" | 2:15 | L+M:Felsenheimer |
| "Love & Pain" | | 2018 | "Seitenhirsch" | | |
| "Mach die Augen zu" | "Close your eyes" | 1993 | "Die Bestie in Menschengestalt" | 4:00 | L+M:Urlaub |
| "Mädchen" | "Girl(s)" | 1984 | "Debil" | 2:55 | L+M:Urlaub |
| "Madonnas Dickdarm (Live)" | "Madonna's colon" | 1988 | "Live - Nach uns die Sintflut" | 1:53 | L:Urlaub M:Felsenheimer/Liebing/Urlaub |
| "Manchmal haben Frauen..." | "Sometimes women have..." | 2000 | "Runter mit den Spendierhosen, Unsichtbarer!" | 4:13 | L+M:Felsenheimer |
| "Matthäus 1:5:0" | | 2000 | "Manchmal haben Frauen..." (single) | 1:01 | L:Felsenheimer/González M:González |
| "Methan" | | 2000 | "Manchmal haben Frauen..." (single) | 2:16 | L+M:Felsenheimer |
| "M&F" | "Men and women" | 2012 | "Auch" | 4:15 | L+M:Urlaub |
| "Miststück" | "Bitch" | 2012 | "Auch" | 3:38 | L+M:Felsenheimer |
| "Männer sind Schweine" (Single name:"Ein Schwein namens Männer") | "Men are pigs" ("A pig called men") | 1998 | "13" | 4:17 | L+M:Urlaub |
| "Mc Donalds" | | 2001 | "5, 6, 7, 8 - Bullenstaat!" | 0:20 | L+M:Felsenheimer |
| "Medusa-Man (Serienmörder Ralf)" | "Medusa Man (Serial killer Ralf)" | 1996 | "Le Frisur" | 5:56 | L:Felsenheimer M:Felsenheimer/Ludwig |
| "Mein Baby war beim Frisör" | "My baby was at the hairdresser's" | 1996 | "Le Frisur" | 2:16 | L+M:Urlaub |
| "Mein Freund Michael" | "My friend Michael" | 1995 | "Planet Punk" | 3:38 | L+M:Urlaub |
| "Mein kleiner Liebling" | "My little sweetheart" | 1984 | "Uns geht's prima..." | 2:26 | L:Felsenheimer M:Felsenheimer/Runge |
| "Meine Ex(plodierte Freundin)" | "My ex(ploded girlfriend)" | 1995 | "Planet Punk" | 3:39 | L+M:Urlaub |
| "Meine Freunde" | "My friends" | 1998 | "13" | 1:47 | L+M:Urlaub |
| "Micha" | | 1984 | "Debil" | 2:52 | L+M:Urlaub |
| "Mit dem Schwert nach Polen, warum René?" | "With a sword to Poland, why René?" | 1993 | "Die Bestie in Menschengestalt" | 4:28 | L+M:Felsenheimer/González/Urlaub |
| "Mondo Bondage" | | 2000 | "Runter mit den Spendierhosen, Unsichtbarer!" | 3:01 | L:Felsenheimer M:González |
| "Monika" | | 1996 | "Le Frisur" | 0:44 | L+M:Urlaub |
| "Monsterparty (unplugged)" | | 2002 | "Unplugged - Rock'n'Roll Realschule" | 3:28 | L+M:Felsenheimer/Urlaub |
| "Morgens Pauken" | "Cramming in the morning" | 2020 | "Hell" | 4:04 | |
| "Motherfucker 666" | | 1996 | "Le Frisur" | 3:00 | L+M:Urlaub |
| "Mr. Sexpistols" | | 1984 | "Debil" | 3:14 | L+M:Felsenheimer |
| "Mutig" | "brave" | 2012 | "ZeiDverschwÄndung" (single) | 2:17 | L+M:Urlaub |
| "Mysteryland" [Remix] | | 1986 [1987] | "Die Ärzte" ["Ist das alles? (13 Höhepunkte mit den Ärzten)"] | 4:02 [3:58] | L+M:Felsenheimer |
| "N 48.3" | | 2000 | "Runter mit den Spendierhosen, Unsichtbarer!" | 2:51 | L+M:Urlaub |
| "Nazareth (Blumen my ass)" | "Nazareth (flowers my ass)" | 1995 | "Planet Punk" | 4:20 | L+M:Felsenheimer |
| "Nein, nein, nein" | "No, no, no" | 1987 | "2000 Mädchen" (single) | 3:42 | L:Felsenheimer M:Urlaub |
| "Nicht allein" | "Not alone" | 2003 | "Geräusch" | 5:19 | L+M:Urlaub |
| "Nichts in der Welt" | "Nothing in the world" | 2003 | "Geräusch" | 3:47 | L+M:Urlaub |
| "Nichts gesehen" [Economy] | "Seen Nothing" | 2008 | "Lied vom Scheitern" (single) ["Lasse redn" (single)] | 3:17 [1:07] | L+M:Urlaub |
| "NichtWissen" | "NotKnowing" | 2003 | "Geräusch" | 4:59 | L+M:Felsenheimer |
| "Nie gesagt" | "Never said" | 1998 | "13" | 4:57 | L+M:Urlaub |
| "Nie wieder Krieg, nie mehr Las Vegas!" | "No more war, no more Las Vegas!" | 1998 | "13" | 2:36 | L+M:Urlaub |
| "Niedliches Liebeslied" [Economy] | "Cute love song" | 2007 | "Jazz ist anders" ["Jazz ist anders (Economy)"] | 3:40 | L:Felsenheimer M:González |
| "Nimm es wie ein Mann (a.k.a. Kurt Cobain)" | "Take it like a man (a.k.a. Kurt Cobain)" | 2007 | "Jazz ist anders" (Bonus CD) | 2:06 | L:Felsenheimer M:González |
| "No Future (Ohne neue Haarfrisur)" | "No future (without a new haircut)" | 1996 | "Le Frisur" | 2:07 | L+M:Urlaub |
| "No Secrets" | | 2018 | "Seitenhirsch" | | |
| "Norma Jean" | | 2018 | "Seitenhirsch" | | |
| "Nur einen Kuss" [Economy] | "Just a kiss/Just one kiss" | 2007 | "Jazz ist anders" ["Jazz ist anders (Economy)"] | 4:25 | L+M:Urlaub |
| "Nur geträumt (Cover)" | "Just a dream" | 2018 | "Seitenhirsch" | | |
| "Ohne dich (die Welt könnte so schön sein...)" | "Without you (the world could be so beautiful...)" | 1988 | "Das ist nicht die ganze Wahrheit..." | 2:49 | L+M:Urlaub |
| "Omaboy" | "Grandma boy" | 1993 | "Die Bestie in Menschengestalt" | 4:45 | L+M:Felsenheimer |
| "Onprangering" | "Denunciation" (corruption of "anprangern") | 2000 | "Runter mit den Spendierhosen, Unsichtbarer!" | 2:53 | L+M:Urlaub |
| "Opfer" | "Victim" | 1995 | "Planet Punk" | 3:01 | L+M:Urlaub |
| "Party stinkt" | "Party stinks" | 1998 | "13" | 3:26 | L+M:Felsenheimer |
| "Paul (der Bademeister)" | "Paul (the pool attendant)" | 1984 | "Debil" | 2:26 | L+M:Urlaub |
| "Perfekt" [Economy] | "Perfect" | 2007 [2008] | "Jazz ist anders" ["Jazz ist anders (Economy)"] | 2:35 | L+M:Felsenheimer |
| "Peter Parker" | | 2018 | "Seitenhirsch" | | |
| "Piercing" | | 2003 | "Geräusch" | 4:17 | L:González/Blitz M:González |
| "Plan B" | | 2020 | "Hell" | 3:19 | |
| "Polyester" | | 2020 | "Hell" | 4:08 | |
| "Popstar" | | 1988 | "Das ist nicht die ganze Wahrheit..." | 3:12 | L+M:Felsenheimer |
| "Poser, du bist ein..." | "Poser, you are a..." | 2000 | "Wie es geht" (single) | 2:00 | L+M:Felsenheimer |
| "Powerlove" | | 2003 | "Dinge von denen" | 4:37 | L+M:Felsenheimer |
| "Pro-Zombie" | | 2003 | "Geräusch" | 2:08 | L+M:Urlaub |
| "Punk ist..." | "Punk is" | 1998 | "13" | 3:41 | L+M:Felsenheimer |
| "Punkbabies" | | 2001 | "5, 6, 7, 8 - Bullenstaat!" | 0:41 | L:Felsenheimer M:Felsenheimer, González, Urlaub |
| "Punkrockgirl" | | 1993 | "Mach die Augen zu" (single) | 1:53 | L+M:Felsenheimer |
| "Quark" "Quark (Neuer Text - 135% politisch korrekt)"/Remix] | "Rubbish"; lit:"Curd" [New lyrics - 135% political correct] | 1993 [1994] | "Die Bestie in Menschengestalt" ["Quark" (single)] | 2:45 [2:44] | L+M:Urlaub |
| "Quadrophenia" | | 2012 | "ZeiDverschwÄndung" (single) | 4:47 | L+M:González |
| "Rache" | "Revenge" | 2001 | "5, 6, 7, 8 - Bullenstaat!" | 0:19 | L:Felsenheimer M:Felsenheimer, González, Urlaub |
| "Radio brennt" [Remix] ["Dingleberry-Mix"/"Maxi"] (inkl.Radio rap) | "Radio burns" | 1987 | "Ist das alles? (13 Höhepunkte mit den Ärzten)" ["Radio brennt (Remix)" (single)] [" Radio brennt (Dingleberry-Mix)" (single)] | 2:42 [2:41] [7:00] | L:Urlaub M:Felsenheimer/Urlaub |
| "Radio rap (live)" | | 1988 | "Live - Nach uns die Sintflut" | 2:31 | L:Urlaub M:Felsenheimer/Urlaub |
| "Rebell" | "Rebel" | 1998 | "13" | 3:51 | L+M:Urlaub |
| "Red mit mir" | "Talk to me" | 1995 | "Planet Punk" | 3:58 | L+M:Urlaub |
| "Regierung" | "Government" | 1995 | "Ein Song namens Schunder" | 2:32 | L+M:Felsenheimer/Urlaub |
| "Rennen nicht laufen!" | "Run, don't walk" | 1985 | "Im Schatten der Ärzte" | 2:40 | L:Felsenheimer/Urlaub M:Urlaub |
| "Rettet die Wale" | "Save the whales" | 2000 | "Manchmal haben Frauen..." (single) | 1:48 | L+M:Urlaub |
| "Richtig schön evil" | "Really quite evil" | 2003 | "Geräusch" | 3:21 | L+M:Felsenheimer |
| "Rock Rendezvous" | | 2000 | "Runter mit den Spendierhosen, Unsichtbarer!" | 4:08 | L+M:Felsenheimer |
| "Rock'n'Roll-Übermensch": Jauche's Piña Colada Mix; Circuit Breaker Mix; Lexy & K-Paul's L&P Mix; Al-Haca Megamensch Dub; Teddy Uranus Mix; Star & Emerson Three Bad Kiddaz Mix; Blank & Jones Remix | "Rock'n'roll-overman" | 2000 [2001] | "Runter mit den Spendierhosen, Unsichtbarer!" ["Rock'n'Roll-Übermensch" (single)] | 4:47: 5:36; 5:01; 5:13; 4:15; 5:07; 5:57; 6:50 | L+M:Felsenheimer/González |
| "Rockabilly Peace" | | 2001 | "5, 6, 7, 8 - Bullenstaat!" | 0:49 | L:Felsenheimer M:Felsenheimer/González/Urlaub |
| "Rockabilly War" | | 2001 | "5, 6, 7, 8 - Bullenstaat!" | 0:39 | L:Urlaub M:Felsenheimer/González/Urlaub |
| "Rod ♥ You" also known as "Rod loves You" | | 1995 | "Planet Punk" | 3:26 | L+M:Felsenheimer/González |
| "Rod Army" | | 1998 | "Goldenes Handwerk" (single) | 2:50 | L+M:Felsenheimer/González |
| "Roter Minirock" | "Red miniskirt" | 1984 | "Debil" | 2:15 | L+M:Runge/Urlaub |
| "Ruhig angehn" | "Takin' it calmly" | 2003 | "Geräusch" | 3:24 | L+M:Felsenheimer |
| "Rückkehr" | "Return" | 2019 | "Drei Mann - Zwei Songs" (single) | | |
| "Sahnie (Ein bisschen schwierig so)" | "Sahnie (a bit difficult that way)" | 2018 | "Seitenhirsch" | | |
| "Samen im Darm" | "Semen in the bowel" | 2001 | "5, 6, 7, 8 - Bullenstaat!" | 4:02 | L+M:Michael Reimann/Frank Bekedorf/Frank Schrader/Thomas Tier from Cretins |
| "Saufen" | "Boozing" | 1998 | "Ein Schwein namens Männer" (single) | 3:48 | L+M:Urlaub |
| "Scheißtyp" | "Shitty guy" | 1984 | "Debil" | 2:58 | L+M:Felsenheimer |
| "Schlaflied" also known as "Das Schlaflied" | "(The) Lullaby" | 1984 | "Debil" | 4:13 | L+M:Urlaub |
| "Schlechte Noten" | "Bad marks" | 1990 | "Moskito songs 2" (sampler) | 4:13 | L+M:Urlaub |
| "Schlimm" | "Bad" | 1998 | "1/2 Lovesong" (single) | 3:34 | L+M:Felsenheimer |
| "Schneller leben" | "Live faster" | 2003 | "Geräusch" | 3:03 | L+M:Urlaub |
| "Schopenhauer" | | 1993 | "Die Bestie in Menschengestalt" | 3:06 | L+M:Urlaub |
| "Schrei nach Liebe" | "Cry for love" | 1993 | "Die Bestie in Menschengestalt" | 4:12 | L+M:Felsenheimer/Urlaub |
| "Schunder-Song" (Single name:"Ein Song namens Schunder") | | 1995 | "Planet Punk" | 3:06 | L+M:Urlaub |
| "Sex me Baby" | | 1995 | "Hurra" (single) | 2:50 | L:González/Felsenheimer M:González |
| "Shit Piece" | | 2000 | "Extrem Terror" (sampler) | 3:05 | L+M:Urlaub |
| "Sie kratzt, sie stinkt, sie klebt" also known as "Sie kratzt" | "She scratches, she stinks, she sticks" | 1988 | "Ab 18" | 2:31 | L+M:Urlaub |
| "Siegerin" also known as "Die Siegerin" | "(The) Winner" (female) | 1988 | "Das ist nicht die ganze Wahrheit..." | 3:10 | L+M:Felsenheimer |
| "Smash the System, Fuck the Police" | | 2018 | "Seitenhirsch" | | |
| "Sie tun es" | "They're doing it" | 1988 | "Live - Zu spät..." | 3:08 | L+M:Felsenheimer/Urlaub |
| "So froh" | "So happy" | 2001 | "5, 6, 7, 8 - Bullenstaat!" | 0:23 | L:Timo Bluck/Detlef Diederichsen from Ede & die Zimmermänner M:DP |
| "Sohn der Leere" | "Son of the Void" | 2012 | "Auch" | 3:42 | L+M:González |
| "Sommer, Palmen, Sonnenschein" | "Summer, palms, sunshine" | 1984 | "Uns geht's prima..." (EP) | 2:50 | L+M:Urlaub |
| "Staub (Aka 13!)" | "dust" | 2018 | "Seitenhirsch" | | |
| "Straight Outta Bückeburg" | | 1996 | "Le Frisur" | 4:28 | L+M:Urlaub |
| "Stick It Out/What's the Ugliest Part of Your Body" | | 1994 | "Friedenspanzer" (single) | 2:08 | L+M:Frank Zappa |
| "Studentenmädchen" | "Student girl" | 2001 | "5, 6, 7, 8 - Bullenstaat!" | 1:03 | L:Felsenheimer M:Felsenheimer/González/Urlaub |
| "Super Drei" | "Super three" | 1995 | "Planet Punk" | 2:15 | L:González/Felsenheimer/Urlaub M:González/Urlaub |
| "Superman" | | 2018 | "Seitenhirsch" | | |
| "Sweet Sweet Gwendoline" | | 1986 | "Die Ärzte" | 2:50 | L+M:Urlaub |
| "System" | | 2003 | "Geräusch" | 2:44 | L+M:Urlaub |
| "Tamagotchi" | | 2012 | "Auch" | 3:05 | L:Felsenheimer/Urlaub M:González |
| "TCR" | "Take care of Rock" | 2012 | "Auch" | 3:44 | L+M:Urlaub |
| "Techno ist die Hölle, mein Sohn" | "Techno is hell, son" | 2018 | "Seitenhirsch" | | |
| "Teddybär" | "Teddy bear" | 1983 | "Zu schön, um wahr zu sein!" (EP) | 2:47 | L+M:Felsenheimer |
| "Teenager Liebe (Echt)" [Unecht] [feat.Axel Knabben] | "Teenager love (authentic/fake)" | 1983 [1989] [2005] | "Zu schön, um wahr zu sein!" (EP) ["Die Ärzte früher!"] ["Original Ärztesoundtrack zum Film "Richy Guitar"" (single)] | 2:58 [3:18] [2:54] | L+M:Urlaub |
| "T-Error" | | 2003 | "Geräusch" | 3:37 | L:González/Blitz M:González |
| "That's Punkrock" | | 2001 | "5, 6, 7, 8 - Bullenstaat!" | 1:01 | L:Felsenheimer M:Felsenheimer/González/Urlaub |
| "Thor" | | 2020 | "Hell" | 2:28 | |
| "Tittenfetischisten" | "Tit-fetishists" | 2001 | "5, 6, 7, 8 - Bullenstaat!" | 0:08 | L+M:Brutal Glöckel Terror |
| "Tittenmaus" | "Tit Mouse" | 1989 | "Die Ärzte früher!" | 5:05 | L+M:Felsenheimer |
| "Tränengas" | "Tear gas" | 2001 | "5, 6, 7, 8 - Bullenstaat!" | 0:59 | L:Urlaub M:Felsenheimer/González/Urlaub |
| "Trick 17 m. S." (Trick 17 mit Selbstüberlistung) | "Trick 17 with self-circumvention" | 1995 | "Planet Punk" | 3:04 | L+M:Urlaub |
| "True Romance" | | 2020 | "Hell" | 2:50 | |
| "Tu das nicht" [Economy] | "Don't do that" | 2007 [2008] | "Jazz ist anders" ["Jazz ist anders (Economy)"] | 3:52 [2:29] | L+M:Felsenheimer |
| "Tut mir leid" | "I'm sorry" | 2007 | "Junge" (single) | 3:27 | L+M:Felsenheimer |
| "Und ich weine" | "And I cry" | 1985 | "Wegen dir" (Single) | 3:02 | L+M:Urlaub |
| "Unholy" | | 1996 | "Ein Song namens Schunder" (single) | 3:28 | L:Vinnie Vincent M:Simmons |
| "Unrockbar" | "Unrockable (rough translation)" | 2003 | "Geräusch" | 4:01 | L+M:Urlaub |
| "Uns geht's prima" | "We're doing great" | 1988 | "Live - Nach uns die Sintflut" | 1:48 | L+M:Urlaub |
| "Verlierer müssen leiden" | "Losers have to suffer" | 2018 | "Seitenhirsch" | | |
| "Vermissen, Baby" | "Miss[ing], baby" (from the line "Du wirst mich vermissen, Baby" - "You will miss me, baby") | 1995 | "Planet Punk" | 3:37 | L:Felsenheimer M:González |
| "Vokuhila Superstar" also known as "Vokuhila" | "Mullet superstar" | 1996 | "Le Frisur" | 4:59 | L+M:Felsenheimer |
| "Vollmilch" | "Whole milk" | 1989 | "Die Ärzte früher!" | 1:54 | L+M:Urlaub |
| "Vorbei ist vorbei" [Economy] | "Over is over" | 2007 [2008] | "Jazz ist anders" ["Jazz ist anders (Economy)"] | 3:04 [3:45] | L+M:Urlaub |
| "Wahre Liebe" | "True love" | 1993 | "Mach die Augen zu" (single) | 3:03 | L+M:Felsenheimer/González/Urlaub |
| "Waldspaziergang mit Folgen" | "Walk in the woods with consequences" | 2012 | "Auch" | 3:25 | L+M:Urlaub |
| "Waldspaziergang mit Gott (religiös bearbeitet von Bela B)" | "Walk in the woods with God (religiously edited by Bela B)" | 2013 | "Waldspaziergang mit Folgen / Sohn der Leere" (Single) | 4:08 | L:Felsenheimer M:Urlaub |
| "WAMMW" (Wenn alle Mädchen Männer wärn) ["WAMMW MESMAAG"] (Wenn alle Männer Mädchen wärn - Mit einer Strophe mehr als auf Geräusch) | "If all men were girls" [If all men were girls - With one more verse than on "Geräusch"] | 2003 | "Geräusch" ["Nichts in der Welt" (single)] | 1:51 [3:53] | L+M:Urlaub |
| "Warrumska" | "Warum?: why? + ska: it's an allusion of the Polish language | 1995 | "Hurra" (single) | 3:54 | L+M:Urlaub |
| "Warum spricht niemand über Gitarristen?" | "Why is nobody talking about guitarists?" | 2020 | "Hell" | 3:22 | |
| "Wegen dir" [Zeltlager-Mix] [Super-Mix] | "Because of you" | 1985 | "Im Schatten der Ärzte" ["Wegen dir" (single)] | 3:05 [3:03] [6:10] | L+M:Urlaub |
| "Wenn es Abend wird" | "When the evening comes" | 1993 | "Schrei nach Liebe" (single) | 6:30 | L+M:Urlaub |
| "Wer hat an der Uhr gedreht?" | "Who has turned the clock" | 1988 | "Live - Nach uns die Sintflut" | 0:30 | L:E. Storeck M:F. Strittmatter, Q. Amper, jr |
| "Wer verliert, hat schon verloren" | "Whoever loses has already lost" | 2020 | "Hell" | 4:02 | |
| "West Berlin" | | 2001 | "5, 6, 7, 8 - Bullenstaat!" | 0:44 | L:Urlaub M:Felsenheimer/González/Urlaub |
| "Westerland" [Kommerzmix/to the Max] [Extended Ganja] | | 1988 | "Das ist nicht die ganze Wahrheit..." ["Westerland" (single)] | 3:41 [9:52] [4:47] | L+M:Urlaub |
| "Wie am ersten Tag" [Remix] [Remix '94] | "Like on the first day" | 1986 [1987] [1994] | "Die Ärzte" ["Ist das alles? (13 Höhepunkte mit den Ärzten)"] ["Das Beste von kurz nach früher bis jetze"] | 3:41 [3:40] [3:42] | L+M:Urlaub |
| "Wie ein Kind" [Reprise] | "Like a child" | 1985 | "Im Schatten der Ärzte" | 3:33 [0:21] | L+M:Runge |
| "Wie es geht" | "How it's done" | 2000 | "Runter mit den Spendierhosen, Unsichtbarer!" | 3:58 | L+M:Urlaub |
| "Widerstand" | "Resistance" | 2001 | "5, 6, 7, 8 - Bullenstaat!" | 0:42 | L:Urlaub M:Felsenheimer, González, Urlaub |
| "Wilde Mädchen" | "Wild girls" | 1989 | "Die Ärzte früher!" | 1:20 | L+M:Urlaub |
| "Wilde Welt" | "Wild world" | 1988 | "Das ist nicht die ganze Wahrheit..." | 2:51 | L+M:Felsenheimer |
| "Will dich zurück" | "Want you back" | 2012 | "zeiDverschwÄndung" (single) | 3:20 | L+M:Felsenheimer |
| "Wir sind die Besten" [Economy] | "We are the best" | 2007 [2008] | "Jazz ist anders" (Bonus CD) ["Lied vom Scheitern" (single)] | 2:28 [2:52] | L+M:Urlaub |
| "Wir sind die Lustigsten" | "We are the funniest" | 2007 | "Jazz ist anders" (Bonus CD) | 4:34 | L+M:González |
| "Wir waren die Besten" [Economy] | "We were the best" | 2007 [2008] | "Jazz ist anders" (Bonus CD) ["Lasse redn" (single)] | 4:14 [4:04] | L+M:Felsenheimer |
| "Wir werden schön" | "We become pretty" | 1986 | "Die Ärzte" | 4:01 | L+M:Felsenheimer |
| "Woodburger" | | 2020 | "Hell" | 4:16 | |
| "Worum es geht" | "What is it about?" | 2003 | "Dinge von denen" (single) | 2:57 | L:González/Blitz M:González |
| "Wunderbare Welt des Farin U." | "Wonderful world of Farin U." | 1998 | "Goldenes Handwerk" (single) | 2:45 | L+M:Urlaub |
| "Yoko Ono" [Do Brasil] [L'Âge d'or Mix] | | 2000 [2001] | "Runter mit den Spendierhosen, Unsichtbarer!" ["Yoko Ono" (single)] | 0:30 [CD:3:06 Vinyl:2:24] [1:23] | L+M:Urlaub [L+M:Felsenheimer/González/Urlaub] |
| "zeiDverschwÄndung" | "Waste of time" | 2012 | "Auch" | 2:55 | L+M:Felsenheimer |
| "Zitroneneis" | "Lemon ice cream" | 1989 | "Die Ärzte früher!" | 2:16 | L+M:Urlaub |
| "Zu spät" [Maxi Version] | "Too late" | 1984 | "Debil" ["Ist das alles? (13 Höhepunkte mit den Ärzten)"] | 2:43 [6:51] | L+M:Urlaub |
| "Zum Bäcker" | "To the baker" | 1989 | "Die Ärzte früher!" | 2:08 | L+M:Urlaub |
| "Zum letzten Mal" [Remix '94] | "For the last time" | 1986 [1994] | "Die Ärzte" ["Das Beste von kurz nach früher bis jetze"] | 4:24 [4:26] | L+M:Urlaub |
| "Zusammenfassung" [Extended 1-13] | "Summary" | 1996 | "Le Frisur" ["Mein Baby war beim Frisör" (single)] | 0:04 [14:38] | |
| "Ärzte-Theme" (Instrumental, feat. Axel Knabben) | | 1984 [2005] | "Debil" ["Devil"] | 2:00 | M:Felsenheimer/Runge/Urlaub |
| "„Was hat der Junge doch für Nerven“" | ""What nerves the boy has"" | 1985 | "Im Schatten der Ärzte" | 3:55 | L+M:Urlaub |
| "♀" also known as "Schwanz ab" | | 1988 | "Das ist nicht die ganze Wahrheit..." | 1:48 | L+M:Urlaub |
| "Anastasia" | | 2021 | "Dunkel" | | |
| "Anti" | | 2021 | "Dunkel" | | |
| "Auserzählt" | "told out" | 2021 | "Noise" (single) | | |
| "Besser" | "better" | 2021 | "Dunkel" | | |
| "Danach" | "after" | 2021 | "Dunkel" | | |
| "Dobly" | | 2021 | "Noise" (single) | | |
| "Doof" | "stupid" | 2021 | "Dunkel" | | |
| "Dunkel" | "dark" | 2021 | "Dunkel" | | |
| "Einschlag" | "impact" | 2021 | "Dunkel" | | |
| "Erhaben" | "sublime" | 2021 | "Dunkel" | | |
| "Kerngeschäft" | "core business" | 2021 | "Dunkel" | | |
| "KFM" | | 2021 | "Dunkel" | | |
| "Kraft" | "force" | 2021 | "Dunkel" | | |
| "Menschen" | "people" | 2021 | "Dunkel" | | |
| "Nachmittag" | "afternoon" | 2021 | "Dunkel" | | |
| "Noise" | | 2021 | "Dunkel" | | |
| "Our Bass Player Hates This Song" | | 2021 | "Dunkel" | | |
| "Schrei" | "scream" | 2021 | "Dunkel" | | |
| "Schweigen" | "silence" | 2021 | "Dunkel" | | |
| "Tristesse" | "sadness" | 2021 | "Dunkel" | | |
| "Wissen" | "knowledge" | 2021 | "Dunkel" | | |

==== Hidden tracks ====
| Title | Released | Album | Length |
|---|---|---|---|
| "♀" | 1988 | "Das ist nicht die ganze Wahrheit..." | 1:49 |
| "Lady" | 1998 | "13" | 3:55 |
| "Hände innen" | 2003 | "Geräusch" | 3:59 |
| "Nimm es wie ein Mann" | 2007 | "Jazz ist anders (Bonus CD)" | 2:06 |

==== Intros and speeches ====
| Title | Released | Album | Length |
|---|---|---|---|
| "Ärzte-Theme" (Instrumental) | 1984 | "Debil" ["Devil"] | 02:00 |
| "Ouvertüre zum besten Konzert der Welt" "Overture to the best concert in the world" | 1988 | "Live - Nach uns die Sintflut" | 01:34 |
| "Inntro" | 1993 | "Die Bestie in Menschengestalt" | 00:06 |
| "Ein Haufen Gebrösel in D-Moll" (Tour-Tour Intro) "A pile of crumbs in D minor" | 1994 | "Quark" (single) | 03:20 |
| "Erklärung" "Declaration" | 1996 | "Le Frisur" | 00:55 |
| "Sprüche I" "Patter I" | 1988 | "Live - Nach uns die Sintflut" | 18:50 |
| "Sprüche II" (Left) | 1999 | "Wir wollen nur deine Seele" | 20:33 |
| "Sprüche II" (Right) | 1999 | "Wir wollen nur deine Seele" | 20:23 |
| "Sprüche III" | 2005 | "Die klügsten Männer der Welt" (single) | 17:22 |

==== Zusammenfassungen ====
- Zusammenfassung (Le Frisur): 0:04
- Zusammenfassung Extended 1-13 (Mein Baby war beim Frisör): 14:38
  - Zusammenfassung 1: 1:31
  - Zusammenfassung 2: 0:50
  - Zusammenfassung 3: 0:31
  - Zusammenfassung 4: 1:11
  - Zusammenfassung 5: 1:19
  - Zusammenfassung 6: 0:55
  - Zusammenfassung 7: 1:38
  - Zusammenfassung 8: 1:02
  - Zusammenfassung 9: 1:22
  - Zusammenfassung 10: 0:58
  - Zusammenfassung 11: 1:13
  - Zusammenfassung 12: 1:01
  - Zusammenfassung 13: 1:42

==== Medleys ====
- Medley I (from Live - Nach uns die Sintflut)
  - a) "When Will I Be Famous" (The Brothers)
  - b) "Tell It to My Heart" (Seth Swirsky, Ernie Gold)
  - c) "Whenever You Need..." (Stock, Aitken and Waterman)
  - d) "I Should Be So Lucky" (Stock, Aitken and Waterman)
  - e) "My Bed Is Too Big" (Dieter Bohlen)
  - f) "Born to Love" (Melloni, Turratti, Chieregato and Beecher)
  - g) "Kiss" (Prince)
  - h) "Zu spät" (Urlaub)
  - i) "Blueprint" (K. Franck)
- Medley II (from Die Schönen und das Biest: Elke (live))
  - a) "Teenager Liebe" (Urlaub)
  - b) "2000 Mädchen" (Urlaub/Felsenheimer, Urlaub)
  - c) "Außerirdische" (Urlaub)
  - d) "Claudia hat 'nen Schäferhund" (Urlaub)
  - e) "Ohne dich" (Urlaub/Urlaub)
  - f) "Du willst mich küssen" (Urlaub)
  - g) "3-Tage-Bart" (Felsenheimer, Urlaub/Urlaub)
  - h) "Roter Minirock" (Runge, Urlaub)
  - i) "Grace Kelly" (Urlaub)
  - j) "Bonnie & Clyde" (Die Toten Hosen:Breitkopf/Frege)
  - k) "Radio brennt" (Urlaub)
  - l) "Frank'n'stein" (Felsenheimer)
  - m) "Anneliese Schmidt" (Urlaub)
  - n) "El Cattivo" (Urlaub)
  - o) "Erna P." (Urlaub)
  - p) "Die Banane" (Felsenheimer, González/Felsenheimer)
  - q) "Westerland" (Urlaub)
- Medley III (from Unplugged - Rock'n'Roll Realschule)
  - a) "Ohne dich" (Urlaub/Urlaub)
  - b) "Paul" (Urlaub/Urlaub)
  - c) "Quark" (Urlaub/Urlaub)
  - d) "Schunder-Song" (Urlaub/Urlaub)
  - e) "Meine Freunde" (Urlaub/Urlaub)
  - f) "Nie wieder Krieg, nie mehr Las Vegas!" (Urlaub/Urlaub)
  - g) "Rettet die Wale" (Urlaub/Urlaub)
  - h) "Der lustige Astronaut" (Urlaub/Urlaub)
  - i) "Las Vegas" (Felsenheimer)

==== Collaborations ====
| Title | Artist | Release |
|---|---|---|
| "Kleine Kerlkes" | Heinz Strunk feat. Herrenchor | Der Mettwurstpapst |
| "Riemefreunt" | Heinz Strunk feat. Herrenchor | Der Mettwurstpapst |
| "Sie hacken auf mir rum" | Thomas D feat. Die Ärzte | Solo |
| "Wie du" | Witte XP feat. Die Ärzte | Wie du |
| "All You Need Is Love (All Star Version)" | The Punkles feat. Die Ärzte, Terrorgruppe, The Bates & Die Mimmi's | The Punkles |
| "All You Need Is Love (All Star Version)" | The Punkles feat. Die Ärzte, Terrorgruppe, The Bates & Die Mimmi's | Beat the Punkles! |

==== Moskito-songs ====
The songs from Gabi & Uwe series, that promoted the youth magazine "Moskito".

| Title | Release |
|---|---|
| "Der Kult ist schuld"^{3} | Unreleased |
| "Das ist Rock'n'Roll" | Ich ess' Blumen; Moskito-Songs; Das Beste von kurz nach früher bis jetze |
| "Er kommt vom Dorf"^{1} | Unreleased |
| "Gabi & Uwe in: Liebe und Frieden" | Moskito-Songs; Das Beste von kurz nach früher bis jetze |
| "Gabi gibt 'ne Party" | Bitte bitte; Moskito-Songs; Das Beste von kurz nach früher bis jetze |
| "Gabi ist pleite" | Radio brennt (Remix); Moskito-Songs |
| "Moskito Loblied"^{2} | Unreleased |
| "Nein, nein, nein" | 2000 Mädchen (Radio-Mix); Moskito-Songs |
| "Schlechte Noten" | Moskito-Songs 2 |
| "Sie tun es" | Live - Zu spät...; Moskito-Songs |
| "Uwe sitzt im Knast"^{2} | Unreleased |
| "Uwe spielt sein Spiel"^{1} | Unreleased |
| "Wahre Liebe" | Mach die Augen zu; Bäst of |

^{1} - by Depp Jones (Bela's band during the hiatus)
^{2} - by King Køng (Farin's band during the hiatus)
^{3} - by Farin & Hoffmann (members of King Køng)

=== Unreleased songs ===
| Title | Translation | Live played | Written by |
|---|---|---|---|
| "Asche" | "Ash" | | L+M:Urlaub |
| "Aus der anderen Welt | "From the other world | | M:González/Schmalzl |
| "Bela B. ist OK" | "Bela B. is OK" | 1997 | |
| "Boris Becker" | | 1986 | |
| "Bratkartoffeln" | "Fried Potatoes" | | L+M:Urlaub |
| "Buried Alive" | | | González |
| "Christoph Kolumbus" | "Christopher Columbus" | | L+M:Urlaub |
| "Der Abwasch" | "The washing up" | | L+M:Urlaub |
| "Der Kult ist schuld" | "The Cult's Fault" | | L+M: Urlaub |
| "Der Versager" | "The Failure" | | L+M:Urlaub |
| "Die alte Spinatwachtel" | "The Old Frump" | 1984 | L:Felsenheimer/Urlaub M:Urlaub |
| "Die Frau gehört ins Bett" | "The Woman Belongs in Bed" | 1983 | |
| "Die Geschichte zweier junger Menschen" | "The Story of Two Young People" | | L+M:Urlaub |
| "Eddie" | | | L+M:Felsenheimer |
| "Freunde" | "Friends" | 1996 | |
| "Geh doch!" | "Go away!" | 1982 | |
| "Gib mir nichts (Das ist das Leben)" | "Give me nothing (that's life)" | 1985 | |
| "Halloween" | | 1984 | |
| "Hijacker Blues" | | | M:González/Schmalzl |
| "Hochzeitsnacht in Rot" | "Wedding Night in Red" | | L+M:Felsenheimer |
| "Ich schließ mich ein" | "I lock myself away" | | L+M: Urlaub |
| "Ich und meine Ohren" | "Me and my Ears" | | L+M:Urlaub |
| "Im Sommer" | "In Summer" | | L+M:Felsenheimer/Urlaub |
| "Jack, der Schlitzer" | "Jack the Slasher" | 1982 | |
| "Käsefondü" | "Cheese Fondu" | | L+M:Urlaub |
| "Klaus, Peter, Willi und Petra" | "Klaus, Peter, Willi and Petra" | 1982 | L+M:Urlaub |
| "Mir ist was auf den Kopf gefallen" | "Something Fell on my Head" | | L+M:Urlaub |
| "Monster aus dem Wald" | "Monster from the Forest" | 1982 | L+M:Urlaub |
| "Moskito Loblied" | "Mosquito Song of Praise" | | L+M:Florie Albrecht/Hoffmann/Urlaub (by King Køng) |
| "Peter, der Kleinste" | "Peter, the Smallest" | | L+M:Felsenheimer |
| "Petra hat Geburtstag" | "It's Petra's Birthday" | | L+M:Urlaub |
| "Sahnebonbon" | "Toffee" | 1984 | L+M:Urlaub |
| "Schlecht im Bett" | "Bad in bed" | | L+M:Urlaub |
| "Schwaben" | "Swabia" | | L+M:Urlaub |
| "Schädel" | "Skull" | 1983 | L+M:Felsenheimer |
| "Sie liegt rum" | "She lies around" | 1982 | |
| "Sie quält mich" | "She torments me" | 1982 | |
| "Stulle mit Jagdwurst" | "Sandwich with Jagdwurst" (hunting sausage) | | Felsenheimer |
| "Töte mich" | "Kill Me" | | L+M:Urlaub |
| "Trecker fahr'n" | "Driving a Tractor" | | L+M:Urlaub |
| "Uncool" | | | |
| "Uwe sitzt im Knast" | "Uwe is in Jail" | | L+M:Urlaub |
| "Verlierer" | "Loser" | 1984 | L+M:Felsenheimer |
| "Wie ein wildes Tier" | "Like a wild animal" | 1982 | |
| "Wie spät" | "What time" | | L+M: Urlaub |

== Farin Urlaub and Farin Urlaub Racing Team songs ==
All songs are written by Farin Urlaub.

| Title | Translation | Re-leased | Album | Length |
|---|---|---|---|---|
| "...und die Gitarre war noch warm" | "...and the guitar was still warm" | 2001 | "Endlich Urlaub!" | 3:39 |
| "1000 Jahre schlechten Sex" | "1000 years of bad sex" | 2001 | "Endlich Urlaub!" | 3:30 |
| "1000 Jahre Tot" | "1000 years dead" | 2017 | "Berliner Schule" | 03:42 |
| "Abschiedslied" | "Farewell song" | 2001 | "Endlich Urlaub" | 3:26 |
| "Alle dasselbe" | "All the same" | 2005 | "Am Ende der Sonne" | 3:28 |
| "Am Strand" | "On the beach" | 2001 | "Endlich Urlaub!" | 2:45 |
| "Apocalypse wann anders" | "Apocalypse some other day" | 2005 | "Am Ende der Sonne" | 4:02 |
| "Atem" | "Breath" | 2008 | "Die Wahrheit übers Lügen" | 4:09 |
| "Augenblick" | "The moment, lit. the blink of an eye" | 2005 | "Am Ende der Sonne" | 3:08 |
| "Das schöne Mädchen" | "The beautiful girl" | 2001 | "Endlich Urlaub!" | 4:37 |
| "Der Kavalier" | "The gentleman" | 2001 | "Endlich Urlaub!" | 3:27 |
| "Dermitder" | "Thewiththe" | 2005 | "Am Ende der Sonne" | 4:03 |
| "Der ziemlich okaye Popsong" | "The quite okay popsong" | 2006 | "Livealbum of Death" | 3:14 |
| "Die Leiche" | "The corpse" | 2008 | "Die Wahrheit übers Lügen" | 3:45 |
| "Dusche" | "Shower" | 2005 | "Am Ende der Sonne" | 4:12 |
| "Glücklich" | "Happy" | 2001 | "Endlich Urlaub!" | 2:56 |
| "Gobi Todic" | | 2008 | "Die Wahrheit übers Lügen" | 2:32 |
| "I.F.D.G." (Ich find das gut) | "I like that" (lit. I find that good) | 2008 | "Die Wahrheit übers Lügen" | 4:06 |
| "Ich gehöre nicht dazu" | "I don't belong to them" | 2001 | "Endlich Urlaub!" | 3:15 |
| "Immer noch" | "Still" | 2005 | "Am Ende der Sonne" | 4:38 |
| "Insel" | "Island" | 2008 | "Die Wahrheit übers Lügen" | 4:06 |
| "Intro (manche nennen es Musik)" | "Intro (some call it music)" | 2001 | "Endlich Urlaub!" | 1:02 |
| "Jeden Tag Sonntag" | "Every day Sunday" | 2001 | "Endlich Urlaub!" | 2:09 |
| "Karten" | "Cards" | 2008 | "Die Wahrheit übers Lügen" | 4:21 |
| "Kein Zurück" | "No return" | 2005 | "Am Ende der Sonne" | 4:54 |
| "Krieg" | "War" | 2008 | "Die Wahrheit übers Lügen" | 3:15 |
| "Lieber Staat" | "Dear state" | 2001 | "Endlich Urlaub!" | 3:53 |
| "Mehr" | "More" | 2005 | "Am Ende der Sonne" | 3:14 |
| "Monster" | | 2008 | "Die Wahrheit übers Lügen" | 3:28 |
| "Nichimgriff" | "Notundercontrol" | 2008 | "Die Wahrheit übers Lügen" | 2:46 |
| "Niemals" | "Never" | 2008 | "Die Wahrheit übers Lügen" | 3:31 |
| "OK" | | 2001 | "Endlich Urlaub!" | 4:19 |
| "Noch einmal" (Hidden Track) | "Once again" | 2005 | "Am Ende der Sonne" | 4:42 |
| "Outro (ja, das wurde auch Zeit)" | "Outro (yeah, it was about time)" | 2001 | "Endlich Urlaub!" | 2:22 |
| "Pakistan" | | 2008 | "Die Wahrheit übers Lügen" | 2:50 |
| "Phänomenal egal" | "Phenomenally indifferent" | 2001 | "Endlich Urlaub!" | 3:13 |
| "Porzellan" | "Porcelain" | 2005 | "Am Ende der Sonne" | 3:52 |
| "Schon wieder" | "Done again" | 2005 | "Am Ende der Sonne" | 1:19 |
| "Seltsam" | "Odd" | 2008 | "Die Wahrheit übers Lügen" | 2:51 |
| "Sonne" | "Sun" | 2005 | "Am Ende der Sonne" | 4:40 |
| "Sumisu" | Japanese for "Smith" – a tribute to "The Smiths" | 2001 | "Endlich Urlaub!" | 2:13 |
| "Trotzdem" | "Nevertheless" | 2008 | "Die Wahrheit übers Lügen" | 2:18 |
| "Unscharf" | "Fuzzy" | 2008 | "Die Wahrheit übers Lügen" | 2:55 |
| "Unsichtbar" | "Invisible" | 2005 | "Am Ende der Sonne" | 3:14 |
| "Unter Wasser" | "Underwater" | 2005 | "Am Ende der Sonne" | 4:02 |
| "Wie ich den Marilyn-Manson-Ähnlichkeitswettbewerb verlor" | "How I lost the Marilyn Manson look-alike contest" | 2005 | "Am Ende der Sonne" | 3:12 |
| "Wir brauchen... Werner" (feat.Bela B.) [Maxi Version] | "We need... Werner" | 1990 | | 3:47 [5:55] |
| "Wunderbar" | "Wonderful" | 2001 | "Endlich Urlaub!" | 2:39 |
| "Zehn" | "Ten" | 2006 | "Livealbum of Death" | 4:15 |
| "Zu heiß" | "Too hot" | 2008 | "Die Wahrheit übers Lügen" | 4:03 |
| "Mein Lied" | "My song" | 2014 | "Faszination Weltraum" | 02:36 |
| "Dynamit" | "Dynamite" | 2014 | "Faszination Weltraum" | 03:23 |
| "Was die Welt jetzt braucht" | "What the world really needs now" | 2014 | "Faszination Weltraum" | 02:44 |
| "Herz? Verloren" | "Heart? Lost" | 2014 | "Faszination Weltraum" | 03:22 |
| "AWG" | "Everything will be fine" | 2014 | "Faszination Weltraum" | 02:41 |
| "Heute tanzen" | "Dance today" | 2014 | "Faszination Weltraum" | 02:27 |
| "iDisco" | | 2014 | "Faszination Weltraum" | 04:02 |
| "Find dich gut" | "Like yourself" | 2014 | "Faszination Weltraum" | 03:09 |
| "Keine Angst" | "No fear" | 2014 | "Faszination Weltraum" | 03:55 |
| "Fan" | | 2014 | "Faszination Weltraum" | 03:39 |
| "Newton hatte Recht" | "Newton was right" | 2014 | "Faszination Weltraum" | 03:16 |
| "Das Traurigste" | "The saddest thing" | 2014 | "Faszination Weltraum" | 05:00 |
| "3000" | | 2014 | "Faszination Weltraum" | 02:44 |
| "Sommer" | "Summer" | 2014 | "Faszination Weltraum" | 04:21 |
| "Immer dabei" | "Always there" | 2014 | "Faszination Weltraum" | 04:07 |
| "Turmstrasse (Instrumental)" | | 2017 | "Berliner Schule" | 03:00 |
| "Schatten" | "Shadow" | 2017 | "Berliner Schule" | 05:11 |
| "A.U.S.T.R.A.L.I.E.N." | "Australia" | 2017 | "Berliner Schule" | 03:06 |
| "Christine" | | 2017 | "Berliner Schule" | 03:43 |
| "Ich bin ein..." | "I am a..." | 2017 | "Berliner Schule" | 02:57 |
| "Bernd hat es gemacht" | "Bernd did it" | 2017 | "Berliner Schule" | 03:41 |
| "Abzweig Leipzig" | "Junction Leipzig" | 2017 | "Berliner Schule" | 03:30 |
| "Was wir sind" | "What we are" | 2017 | "Berliner Schule" | 03:13 |
| "Uncool" | "Not cool" | 2017 | "Berliner Schule" | 03:24 |
| "Kaum mehr als ein Traum" | "Hardly more than a dream" | 2017 | "Berliner Schule" | 04:11 |
| "Ich bin allein" | "I am alone" | 2017 | "Berliner Schule" | 05:20 |
| "Mein Mädchen" | "My girl" | 2017 | "Berliner Schule" | 02:36 |
| "Bitte lass mich schlafen" | "Please let me sleep" | 2017 | "Berliner Schule" | 04:03 |
| "Intro" | | 2017 | "Berliner Schule" | 03:04 |
| "Fucking Hell" | | 2017 | "Berliner Schule" | 04:06 |
| "Bestimmt...!" | "Certainly...!" | 2017 | "Berliner Schule" | 03:01 |
| "Luzifer" | "Lucifer" | 2017 | "Berliner Schule" | 03:21 |
| "Bist du dabei?" | "Are you in?" | 2017 | "Berliner Schule" | 03:22 |
| "Ein guter Tag" | "A good day" | 2017 | "Berliner Schule" | 03:55 |
| "Ich will dich nicht mehr" | "I don't want you anymore" | 2017 | "Berliner Schule" | 01:57 |
| "Date avec moi" | "Date with me" | 2017 | "Berliner Schule" | 02:46 |
| "The Power of Blöd" | "The power of stupid" | 2017 | "Berliner Schule" | 03:04 |
| "Bier in mir" | "Beer in me" | 2017 | "Berliner Schule" | 02:44 |
| "Hier sind die Ärzte" | "Here are Die Ärzte" | 2017 | "Berliner Schule" | 02:23 |
| "Warum auch immer" | "For whatever reason" | 2017 | "Berliner Schule" | 02:54 |
| "Lieblingslied" | "Favourite song" | 2017 | "Berliner Schule" | 03:38 |
| "Antimattergun" | | 2017 | "Berliner Schule" | 07:17 |

== Bela B. songs ==
All songs are written by Bela B.

| Title | Translation | Re-leased | Length | Guest appearance |
|---|---|---|---|---|
| "1. 2. 3. ..." | | 2006 | 3:03 | feat. Charlotte Roche |
| "Als wir unsterblich waren" | "When we were immortal" | 2009 | 3:00 | |
| "Altes Arschloch Liebe" | "Old asshole love" | 2009 | 4:27 | |
| "Baby läuft fort" | "Baby runs away" | 2006 | 3:49 | |
| "B-Vertüre" | "B-verture" | 2006 | 1:22 | |
| "Bobotanz" | "Bobo dance" | 2009 | 4:27 | |
| "Candy" | | 2002 | 3:59 | Guest appearance by Killer Barbies |
| "Chocolate for the Tears" | | 2000 | 3:54 | Guest appearance by Diane Lemonbaby |
| "Dein Schlaflied" | "Your lullaby" | 2009 | 4:08 | |
| "Der Vampir mit dem Colt" | "The Vampire with the Colt" | 2006 | 4:48 | |
| "Der Wahrheit" | "The Truth" | 2009 | 3:28 | feat. Alessandro Alessandroni |
| "Fussball ist immer noch wichtig" | "Football is still important" | 2006 | 4:00 | feat. Fettes Brot, Marcus Wiebusch & Carsten Friedrichs |
| "Geburtstagsleid" | "Birthday misery" | 2009 | 3:40 | |
| "Gitarre runter" | "Guitar down" | 2006 | 3:46 | |
| "Grönemeyer kann nicht tanzen" | "Herbert Grönemeyer can't dance" | 1989 | 4:36 | feat. Wiglaf Droste |
| "Hab keine Angst" | "Have no fear" | 2006 | 3:55 | feat. Lula |
| "Hölle" | "Hell" | 2008 | 4:00 | Guest appearance by K.I.Z |
| "Hilf dir Selbst | "Help yourself" | 2009 | 3:07 | |
| "Irgendetwas bleibt" | "Something stays" | 2006 | 3:30 | |
| "In diesem Leben nicht" | "Not in this life" | 2009 | 3:28 | feat. Chris Spedding |
| "Leave" | | 2000 | 3:41 | feat. Lula |
| "Lee Hazlewood & das erste Lied des Tages" | "Lee Hazlewood & The first song of the day" | 2006 | 3:11 | feat. Lee Hazlewood |
| "Letzter Tag" | "Last day" | 2006 | 4:13 | |
| "Liebe und Benzin" | "Love and Benzine" | 2009 | 3:48 | feat. Emmanuelle Seigner |
| "Nein!" | "No!" | 2009 | 3:17 | |
| "Ninjababypowpow" | | 2009 | 4:03 | feat. Chris Spedding |
| "Onenightstand" | | 2009 | 3:33 | |
| "Pogo Dancing" | | 1989 | 3:20 | feat. PVC |
| "Rockula" | | 2009 | 3:05 | |
| "Schwarz/Weiss" | "Black/White" | 2009 | 3:13 | feat. Marcel Eger |
| "Sie hat was vermisst" | "She missed something" | 2006 | 4:06 | |
| "Tag für Sieger" | "Day for winners" | 2010 | 3:51 | |
| "Tag mit Schutzumschlag" | "The day with the dust jacket" | 2006 | 3:06 | |
| "Tanzverbot (Schill to Hell)" | "Dance ban" | 2003 | 3:30 | feat. Fettes Brot |
| "Theme from Bingowings" (Hidden Track) | | 2006 | 1:10 | |
| "This Girl Was Made for Loving" | | 1997 | 3:06 | feat. Heike Makatsch |
| "Traumfrau" [Traumfrau again] | "Dream woman" | 2006 | 3:07 [1:05] | |
| "Versuchs doch mal mit mir" | "Why don't you try me for once" | 2006 | 3:07 | |
| "Was ist nur los...?" | "What's the matter...?" | 2006 | 2:34 | |
| "Wiehr thind sssuper" | "We are super" | 2006 | 3:17 | |
| "Wir brauchen... Werner" [Maxi Version] | "We need... Werner" | 1990 | 3:47 [5:55] | feat. Jan Vetter |
| "You'll Never Walk Alone" | | 2002 | 3:38 | feat. The Tikiwolves and Gary'o'Wolf |
| "ZappingsonG" | "Channel-surfing sonG" | 2006 | 2:08 | |
| "Abserviert" | "ditched" | 2014 | 03:39 | feat. Smokestack Lightnin' |
| "Wenn das mal Liebe wird" | "When that happens to be love" | 2014 | 02:23 | feat. Smokestack Lightnin' |
| "Streichholzmann" | "Matchstick man" | 2014 | 03:36 | feat. Smokestack Lightnin' |
| "Der Sünder" | "The sinner" | 2014 | 03:13 | feat. Smokestack Lightnin' |
| "Immer So Sein" | "Always be like this" | 2014 | 03:17 | feat. Smokestack Lightnin' |
| "Sentimental" | | 2014 | 04:04 | feat. Smokestack Lightnin' |
| "Teufelsküche" | "Devil's kitchen" | 2014 | 03:21 | feat. Smokestack Lightnin' |
| "Nicht nice" | "Not nice" | 2014 | 04:51 | feat. Smokestack Lightnin' |
| "Belphegor" | | 2014 | 02:31 | feat. Smokestack Lightnin' |
| "Verwöhn'" | "indulge" | 2014 | 04:11 | feat. Smokestack Lightnin' |
| "Bombe tickt" | "Bomb Ticking" | 2014 | 03:13 | feat. Smokestack Lightnin' |
| "My Soul / Dein Herz" | "My Soul / Your heart" | 2014 | 03:14 | feat. Smokestack Lightnin' and Lynda Kay |
| "Peng!" | | 2014 | 04:07 | feat. Smokestack Lightnin' |
| "Sartana Thema" | | 2017 | 02:34 | feat. Peta Devlin & Smokestack Lightnin' |
| "Der Dreck von Indian Creek" | "The filth of Indian Creek" | 2017 | 02:14 | feat. Peta Devlin & Smokestack Lightnin' |
| "Neulich in Lee Tse Tungs Gambling House (Sartana, Pigott, Lee Tse Tsung)" | "Recently in Lee Tse Tungs Gambling House" | 2017 | 00:58 | feat. Peta Devlin & Smokestack Lightnin' |
| "Warum denn kein Chop Suey" | "Why no chop suey?" | 2017 | 03:27 | feat. Peta Devlin & Smokestack Lightnin' |
| "Sehe ich denn so hilfsbedürftig aus, Mister? (Jasmine, Sartana)" | "Do I look so needy, mister?" | 2017 | 00:24 | feat. Peta Devlin & Smokestack Lightnin' |
| "Das schwache Geschlecht" | "The Weaker Sex" | 2017 | 02:18 | feat. Peta Devlin & Smokestack Lightnin' |
| "Zuhaus" | "At home" | 2017 | 04:10 | feat. Peta Devlin & Smokestack Lightnin' |
| "Im staubigen Staub der Staubwüste (Rainer Brand)" | "In dusty dust of the dusty desert" | 2017 | 00:18 | feat. Peta Devlin & Smokestack Lightnin' |
| "Showdown" | | 2017 | 02:50 | feat. Peta Devlin & Smokestack Lightnin' |
| "Ode an das Bahnhofskino" | "Ode to the station cinema" | 2017 | 03:51 | feat. Peta Devlin & Smokestack Lightnin' |
| "Sartana trifft die Pigott-Brüder (Rainer Brandt, Sartana, die Gebrüder Pigott)" | "Sartana Meets The Pigott Brothers" | 2017 | 00:51 | feat. Peta Devlin & Smokestack Lightnin' |
| "Noch warm und schon Sand drauf" | "Still warm and already sand on top" | 2017 | 04:12 | feat. Peta Devlin & Smokestack Lightnin' |
| "Missgeschick & Blei" | "Adversity & lead" | 2017 | 03:11 | feat. Peta Devlin & Smokestack Lightnin' |
| "Einer bleibt liegen" | "One will stay lying down" | 2017 | 02:45 | feat. Peta Devlin & Smokestack Lightnin' |
| "Halt, halt... stop! (Peta Devlin, Bela B.)" | "Stop, stop ... stop!" | 2017 | 00:07 | feat. Peta Devlin & Smokestack Lightnin' |
| "Bärenjagd" | "bear hunting" | 2017 | 03:56 | feat. Peta Devlin & Smokestack Lightnin' |
| "Au Repertoire (Jasmine, Sartana)" | "From the repertoire" | 2017 | 00:32 | feat. Peta Devlin & Smokestack Lightnin' |
