= Killer (video) =

First DVD by German rock band Die Ärzte

Video by Die Ärzte
- Released: 22 November 1999 (VHS); 22 October 2000 (DVD)
- Genre: Punk rock
- Length: VHS: 89 min DVD: 167 min
- Label: Hot Action Records
- Producer: Die Ärzte

Die Ärzte chronology
Noch mehr gefangen im Schattenreich von Die Ärzte (1996)	Killer (1999)	Unplugged: Rock'n'Roll Realschule (2002)

Die Ärzte albums chronology
Satanische Pferde (1999)	Killer (1999/2000)	Runter mit den Spendierhosen, Unsichtbarer! (2000)

Killer (DVD)

Killer is the sixth music VHS and first DVD by German rock band Die Ärzte. The 2009 DVD Overkiller is an expansion of that. The video is a video clip compilation.

== Content ==
When the DVD starts, you fly through the following cities:

- "Rio"
- "New York City"
- "Tokyo"

Below the cities stands: Das ist nicht ... (This is not ...). At the end you fly to the stage (Main menu) then it says: Das ist Die Beste Band der Welt (This is the best band of the world).

The menu is divided into two parts:

- Backstage
- Videography

Backstage you'll be greeted by Bela B., in the videography by Farin Urlaub.

The backstage is a spaceship, five buttons link:

- A Televisor → Plays a video mix of:
  - music-videos and making ofs with comments
  - advertising affiliated by Bela B., Farin Urlaub and Rodrigo González
  - six episodes of "Die Ärzte spielen Serienklassiker"
- A star on the televisor → Plays the making of and the credits of the DVD
- A cabinet under the televisor → Plays the special video "Wie es geht"
- A glass ball down in the right → Plays 17 scenes of "Die Ärzte WG"
- A digital clock right at the top → Plays the best scenes of "Gefangen im Schattenreich von Die Ärzte"

A woman introduces each album and the music videos on the albums. On the video are all music videos from 1993 up to 1999.

=== Music videos ===
1. Quark
2. Schrei nach Liebe
3. Mach die Augen zu
4. Friedenspanzer
5. Schunder-Song
6. Hurra
7. Rod ♥ You
8. 3-Tage-Bart
9. Mein Baby war beim Frisör
10. Männer sind Schweine
11. Goldenes Handwerk
12. 1/2 Lovesong
13. Rebell
14. Elke (live)
- Special: A karaoke version of the song "Dauerwelle vs. Minipli" in variant languages

=== Song information ===
- Tracks 1, 2, 3, 4 from the album Die Bestie in Menschengestalt
- Tracks 5, 6, 7 from the album Planet Punk
- Tracks 8, 9 from the album Le Frisur
- Tracks 10, 11, 12, 13 from the album 13
- Track 14 from the album Wir wollen nur deine Seele

== Overkiller ==
Overkiller

Video by Die Ärzte
- Released: 4 December 2009
- Genre: Punk rock
- Label: Hot Action Records
- Producer: Die Ärzte

Die Ärzte chronology
Die Beste Band der Welt (...und zwar live) (2007)	Overkiller (2009)

Die Ärzte albums chronology
Jazz ist anders (2007)	Overkiller (2009)	auch (2012)

Overkiller is the sixth DVD by German rock band Die Ärzte and the expansion of Killer. It features every music video by the band from 2000 up to 2009.

=== Music videos ===
1. Wie es geht (3:41)
2. Manchmal haben Frauen... (4:47)
3. Yoko Ono (0:48)
4. Rock'n'Roll-Übermensch (3:55)
5. Komm zurück (unplugged) (3:31)
6. Die Banane (unplugged) (5:00)
7. Schlaflied (unplugged) (4:27)
8. Monsterparty (unplugged) (3:37)
9. Unrockbar (4:33)
10. Dinge von denen (4:41)
11. Nichts in der Welt (3:48)
12. Deine Schuld (3:55)
13. Die klügsten Männer der Welt (4:14)
14. Junge (3:37)^{1}
15. Lied vom Scheitern (3:38)
16. Lasse redn (2:48)
17. PerfektBreitHimmelblau (10:08)

=== Specials ===
- Aussteiger I (0:26)
- Aussteiger II (0:14)
- Aussteiger III (0:33)
- Fakevideo Bela – "Medusa-Man (Serienmörder Ralf)" (5:58)
- Fakevideo Farin – "System" (2:46)
- Fakevideo Rod – "Paul" (3:09)
- Rod Multiangle zu Samuel L. ... (1:39)
- Samuel L. Bronkowitz präsentiert... (13:14)^{2}

Music videos in other versions:

- Dinge von denen (ohne Bela) (4:20)^{3}
- Lasse redn (Barrierefrei) (2:48)^{4}
- PerfektBreitHimmelblau (Splitscreen-Version mit frei wählbarer Tonspur)^{5}
- Unrockbar (Storyboard) (4:34)^{6}

Making ofs:

- Abspanncredits (Making of) (5:08)
- Lied vom Scheitern (Making of) (3:38)

Live videos:

- Junge (Live)^{7}

^{1} This is the censored video; the uncensored video of "Junge" is not on this DVD, but you can download it via a code included on a card packaged in the release.
^{2} This is an old video of a concert by Soilent Grün and the making of "Teenager Liebe".
^{3} The official music video without Bela B.
^{4} The official music video; down in the left is an interpreter. He is talking sign language.
^{5} The three music videos in split screen.
^{6} The official music video with the storyboard under the video.
^{7} Performed live at the Jazzfäst-tour in Berlin 12 July 2008.

=== Video-FSK ===
FSK is a German motion picture rating system which defines minimum ages for videos.

==== FSK 6 ====
- Lied vom Scheitern (Making of)
- Deine Schuld
- Dinge von denen
- Junge (live)
- Monsterparty (unplugged)
- Rock'n'Roll-Übermensch

==== FSK 12 ====
- Junge
- Lied vom Scheitern
- Schlaflied (unplugged)
- Unrockbar

==== FSK 16 ====
- Manchmal haben Frauen...

All other videos are without "FSK".

=== Song information ===
- Tracks 1, 2, 3, 4 from the album Runter mit den Spendierhosen, Unsichtbarer!
- Tracks 5, 6, 7, 8 from the album Unplugged: Rock'n'Roll Realschule
- Tracks 9, 10, 11, 12, 13 from the album Geräusch
- Tracks 14, 15, 16, 17 from the album Jazz ist anders
