= Mondo =

Mondo (Italian, Ido, and Esperanto for world), may refer to:

== People ==
- Michael Mondo, Papua New Guinean rugby league footballer
- Mondo Guerra, American fashion designer
- Armand ”Mondo” Duplantis, American-born Swedish pole vaulter

== Computer science ==
- Mondo Rescue, a GPL data backup and recovery software project
- Mondo, a beta build of Microsoft Office 2010

== Culture and entertainment ==
=== Fictional characters ===
- Mondo (comics), a comic book character
- Montgomery “Mondo” Brando, a character from the American animated sitcom Good Vibes
- Mondo (Toshinden character), a character in the Battle Arena Toshinden fighting game series
- King Mondo, the leader of the fictional Machine Empire and the main villain in Power Rangers: Zeo
- Mondo Agake, a character from Mobile Suit Gundam ZZ
- Mondo Gecko, a supporting character in Teenage Mutant Ninja Turtles
- Mondo, a "professional bug-hunter" from the Aliens comic book series
- Mondo Owada, a character from the video game Danganronpa: Trigger Happy Havoc
- Mondo Tatsumi, a character from the Kyuukyuu Sentai GoGo-V
- Misao Mondo, a character from the Doubutsu Sentai Zyuohger
- Mondo Zappa, main character from the video game Killer Is Dead
- The Mondo-Bot, a character in the fourth season of the animated TV series Samurai Jack

=== Film ===
- Mondo Cane, a 1962 documentary film
  - Mondo film, a documentary film style named after the 1962 movie
- Mondovino, a 2004 documentary film
- Mondo (film), a 1995 drama directed by Tony Gatlif

=== Music ===
- Mondo Generator, a US band
- Mondo Gecko, is a Boston-based "Neo-Jam Band" who mixes a blend of intricate compositions, catchy songs and a fun stage presence
- Mondo Records, a record label

=== Albums ===
- Mondo, album by Luca Carboni
- Mondo (album), a 2012 debut album by Electric Guest
- Mondo, a 1993 album (although not released in the UK until 1999) by the Would-Be-Goods

=== Songs ===
- "Mondo", Cesare Cremonini song
- "Mondo Fever", a song by My Life with the Thrill Kill Kult
- "Mondo Bondage", a song by The Tubes from their Eponymous first album
- "Mondo Bondage", a song by Die Ärzte on the Runter mit den Spendierhosen, Unsichtbarer! album, played on the Jazzfäst tour

== Companies ==
- Mondo (American company), a company known for releasing custom movie posters, vinyl soundtracks, and apparel
- Mondo (Italian company), a manufacturing company known for producing athletic rubber products
- Mondo TV, an Italian production and distribution animation company
- Mondo Media, a company that produces entertainment shows
- Monzo, a UK-based bank initially named Mondo

== Other uses ==
- Mondo (beverage), fruit-flavored beverage
- Mondo language
- Mondo (scripture), recorded collection of dialogues between a pupil and a rōshi (a Zen Buddhist teacher)
- Mondo (Tanzanian ward), an administrative ward in the Kondoa district of the Dodoma Region of Tanzania
- Mondo 2000, a publication aimed at cyberpunks and dubbed "the next millennium's first magazine"
- MONDO (Monarch Disease Ontology), ontology developed by the Monarch Initiative.
- Ophiopogon, a genus of plants

== See also ==
- Il Mondo (disambiguation)
- Mondovi (disambiguation)
- Mondo a go go (disambiguation)
