= Auch (album) =

auch

Studio album by Die Ärzte
- Released: 13 April 2012
- Genre: Pop punk; pop rock; alternative rock
- Length: 52:32
- Label: Hot Action
- Producer: Die Ärzte

Die Ärzte chronology
| Overkiller (2009) | auch (2012) | Live - Die Nacht der Dämonen (2013) |

Singles from auch
- 1. "zeiDverschwÄndung" Released: 2 March 2012; 2. "M&F" Released: 18 May 2012; 3. "Ist das noch Punkrock?" Released: 26 October 2012; 4. "Waldspaziergang mit Folgen / Sohn der Leere" Released: 15 March 2013

Professional ratings
Review scores
| Source | Rating |
|---|---|
| Rolling Stone | 3/5 stars |
| Musikexpress | 4/6 stars |
| laut.de | 2/5 stars |

auch ("also") is the twelfth full-length studio album by German rock band Die Ärzte. It was released on 13 April 2012. For each song on the album, an animation and a performance video was released on YouTube. The B-sides of the singles also received a video (altogether 37 videos). The videos can also be bought in iTunes. The first single "zeiDverschwÄndung" was released on 2 March 2012.

While a commercial success - the album reached the first position in Germany, Austria and Switzerland in the first week after its release - critical reception of auch was generally mixed. Promoting and touring in support of the album led to personal tensions within the band that resulted in the Die Ärzte's second hiatus (which unlike their first one was unintended) that ended with the writing and recording of Hell, released in 2020.

== Layout ==
The layout was made by Felix Schlüter instead of the designer Schwarwel who designed for Die Ärzte since 1993.

The package is a carton box like the package of the album Jazz ist anders. Inside the box is a party game: The CD is a turntable, three crown corks are the figures and the booklet is the game field.

== Track listing ==
| No. | Title | Music/Lyrics | Length |
|---|---|---|---|
| 1. | "Ist das noch Punkrock?" (Is This Still Punkrock?) | Farin Urlaub | 2:59 |
| 2. | "Bettmagnet" (Bed Magnet) | Bela B | 3:07 |
| 3. | "Sohn der Leere" (Son of the Void) | Rodrigo González | 3:42 |
| 4. | "TCR" (Taking Care of Rock) | Urlaub | 3:44 |
| 5. | "Das darfst du" (You Are Allowed To) | Bela B | 3:20 |
| 6. | "Tamagotchi" | González, Bela B, Urlaub | 3:06 |
| 7. | "M&F" (Men & Women) | Urlaub | 4:16 |
| 8. | "Freundschaft ist Kunst" (Friendship is Art) | Bela B | 3:22 |
| 9. | "Angekumpelt" | González, Urlaub | 2:34 |
| 10. | "Waldspaziergang mit Folgen" (Walk in the Woods with Consequences) | Urlaub | 3:27 |
| 11. | "Fiasko" (Fiasco) | Urlaub | 2:44 |
| 12. | "Miststück" (Bitch) | Bela B | 3:39 |
| 13. | "Das finde ich gut" (I Like It) | González | 2:27 |
| 14. | "Cpt. Metal" | Urlaub | 4:36 |
| 15. | "Die Hard" | González | 2:20 |
| 16. | "zeiDverschwÄndung" (corruption of "Zeitverschwendung", which means "Waste of time") | Bela B | 2:57 |
| Total length: | | | 52:32 |

== Charts ==
=== Weekly charts ===
| Chart (2012) | Peak position |
|---|---|
| Austrian Albums (Ö3 Austria) | 1 |
| German Albums (Offizielle Top 100) | 1 |
| Swiss Albums (Schweizer Hitparade) | 1 |

=== Year-end charts ===
| Chart (2012) | Position |
|---|---|
| Austrian Albums (Ö3 Austria) | 11 |
| German Albums (Offizielle Top 100) | 8 |
| Swiss Albums (Schweizer Hitparade) | 51 |

=== Certifications ===
| Region | Certification | Certified units/sales |
|---|---|---|
| Austria (IFPI Austria) | Gold | 10,000^{*} |
| Germany (BVMI) | Platinum | 200,000^{^} |
^{*} Sales figures based on certification alone.^{^} Shipments figures based on certification alone.

== Personnel ==
- Farin Urlaub – guitar (all), vocals (1, 4, 7, 10–11, 14)
- Bela Felsenheimer – drums (all), vocals (2, 5, 8, 12, 16)
- Rodrigo González – bass (all), vocals (3, 6, 9, 13, 15), synthesizer (6–7)
