= Stupid Thing =

Stupid Thing or Stupid Things may refer to:

- "Stupid Thing" (Aimee Mann song), 1993
- Stupid Thing, a 1993 album by Bob Schmidt
- "Stupid Thing", a 1993 song by Paul Quinn & The Independent Group
- "Stupid Things" (Keane song), 2019
- "Stupid Things" (Yo La Tengo song), 2012
- "The Stupid Things", a song by Jesse McCartney from the 2004 album Beautiful Soul
- "Dumme Sache" ('Stupid thing'), a 2019 song by Die Ärzte

== See also ==
- Stupid Things That Mean the World, a 2015 album by Tim Bowness
