= Morgens Pauken =

Single by Die Ärzte

from the album Hell
- Released: 21 August 2020
- Genre: Punk rock, hard rock
- Length: 4:04
- Label: Hot Action Records
- Songwriter(s): Jan Vetter, Rodrigo González
- Producer(s): Die Ärzte

Die Ärzte singles chronology
"Ein Lied für jetzt" (2020)	"Morgens Pauken" (2020)	"True Romance" (2020)

"Morgens Pauken" (Cramming in the morning) is a song by German rock band Die Ärzte. It's the fifth track and the first single from their 2020 album Hell. The song is a satirical ode to the punk scene and everything being punk, making references to Frank Zappa, Frank Zander and the punk legends GG Allin and Sid Vicious. The title however appears nowhere in the lyrics.

== Personnel ==
- Rodrigo González – lead vocals, bass
- Farin Urlaub – vocals (chorus and bridge), guitar, talk box
- Bela B. – drums, intro scream

== Charts ==
Chart (2020)	Peak position
Germany (GfK)	3
Switzerland (Schweizer Hitparade)	86
