= Mondavi =

Mondavi may refer to:

- Robert Mondavi (1913–2008), vineyard operator in Napa Valley, California
- Peter Mondavi (1914–2016), American winemaker
- Margrit Mondavi (1925–2016), Swiss-born American businesswoman
- Mondavi Center, a performing arts venue on the UC Davis campus in Davis, California

== See also ==
- Mondovi (disambiguation)
