= Himmelblau =

Himmelblau is a German language surname, which means "skyblue". Notable people with the surname include:

- David Himmelblau (1924–2011), American scientist
- Fabian Himmelblau (1860–1931), Polish bookseller and publisher

== See also ==
- Coop Himmelb(l)au, an architectural firm
- Himmelblau's function, in mathematical optimization
- PerfektBreitHimmelblau, a set of songs
- Himmelblau, an open source software project which integrates Linux systems with Entra Id and Intune.
