= Jazz ist anders =

Studio album by German rock band Die Ärzte

Studio album by Die Ärzte
- Released: 2 November 2007
- Genre: Punk rock, pop punk, alternative rock
- Length: 50:47 (album); 13:24 (bonus EP)
- Label: Hot Action Records
- Producer: Die Ärzte

Die Ärzte chronology
| Bäst of (2006) | Jazz ist anders (2007) | Overkiller (2009) |

Singles from Jazz ist anders
- 1. "Junge" Released: 5 October 2007; 2. "Lied vom Scheitern" Released: 18 January 2008; 3. "Lasse redn" Released: 11 April 2008; 4. "PerfektBreitHimmelblau" Released: 4 December 2009

Professional ratings
Review scores
| Source | Rating |
|---|---|
| AllMusic | 3.5/5 stars |
| laut.de | 2/5 stars |
| Plattentests.de | (7/10) |

Jazz ist anders ("Jazz is different") is the eleventh full-length studio album by German rock band Die Ärzte. It was released on 2 November 2007. The album has a bonus-EP with three songs about the band and a hidden track. This is the first album after Debil that Die Ärzte produced alone. The cover is a reference to the most consumed food during their studio sessions: pizza. The whole packaging looks like a pizza box; the CD itself has a picture of a pizza on it and the bonus EP on their website is accessible using a code printed on paper in the shape of a green pepper. The EP looks like a tomato slice. The album has been criticized for not being as funny as one would expect from Die Ärzte, although it was very warmly received by fans.

== Track listing ==
| No. | Title | Lyrics | Music | Literal translation | Length |
|---|---|---|---|---|---|
| 1. | "Himmelblau" | Urlaub | Urlaub | "Sky Blue" | 3:16 |
| 2. | "Lied vom Scheitern" | Felsenheimer | Felsenheimer | "Song About Failing" | 3:29 |
| 3. | "Breit" | González, Urlaub | González | "Wide", colloquially "Drunk" or "Stoned" | 3:14 |
| 4. | "Lasse redn" | Urlaub | Urlaub | "Let 'Em Talk" | 2:49 |
| 5. | "Die ewige Maitresse" | Felsenheimer | González | "The Eternal Mistress" | 2:24 |
| 6. | "Junge" | Urlaub | Urlaub | "Boy" | 3:07 |
| 7. | "Nur einen Kuss" | Urlaub | Urlaub | "Just a Kiss" or "Just one Kiss" | 4:25 |
| 8. | "Perfekt" | Felsenheimer | Felsenheimer | "Perfect" | 2:35 |
| 9. | "Heulerei" | Urlaub | Urlaub | "Crying" or "Whining" | 2:13 |
| 10. | "Licht am Ende des Sarges" | Felsenheimer | Felsenheimer | "Light at the End of the Coffin" | 2:47 |
| 11. | "Niedliches Liebeslied" | Felsenheimer | González | "Cute Love Song" | 3:40 |
| 12. | "Deine Freundin (wäre mir zu anstrengend)" | Urlaub | Urlaub | "Your Girlfriend (Would Be too Strenuous for Me)" | 2:12 |
| 13. | "Allein" | Urlaub | Urlaub | "Alone" | 3:48 |
| 14. | "Tu das nicht" | Felsenheimer | Felsenheimer | "Don't Do That" | 3:52 |
| 15. | "Living Hell" | Urlaub | Urlaub | | 3:41 |
| 16. | "Vorbei ist vorbei" | Urlaub | Urlaub | "Over Is Over" | 3:00 |
| Total length: | | | | | 50:47 |

=== Bonus EP ===
| No. | Title | Lyrics | Music | Literal translation | Length |
|---|---|---|---|---|---|
| 0. | "Nimm es wie ein Mann (a.k.a. Kurt Cobain)" (hidden in the pregap) | Felsenheimer | González | "Take It Like a Man" | 2:06 |
| 1. | "Wir sind die Besten" | Urlaub | Urlaub | "We're the Best" | 2:28 |
| 2. | "Wir waren die Besten" | Felsenheimer | Felsenheimer | "We Were the Best" | 4:14 |
| 3. | "Wir sind die Lustigsten" | González | González | "We're the Funniest" | 4:34 |
| Total length: | | | | | 13:24 |

- "Nimm es wie ein Mann (a.k.a. Kurt Cobain)" is after "Wir sind die lustigsten" on vinyl and download versions.

== Singles ==
2007: "Junge"
2008: "Lied vom Scheitern"
2008: "Lasse redn"
2009: "Perfekt" "Breit" "Himmelblau"

== Charts and certifications ==
=== Weekly charts ===
Chart performance for Jazz ist anders
| Chart (2007–2009) | Peak position |
|---|---|
| Austrian Albums (Ö3 Austria) | 2 |
| German Albums (Offizielle Top 100) | 1 |
| Swiss Albums (Schweizer Hitparade) | 2 |

=== Year-end charts ===
Year-end chart performance for Jazz ist anders
| Chart (2007) | Position |
|---|---|
| Austrian Albums (Ö3 Austria) | 34 |
| German Albums (Offizielle Top 100) | 21 |
| Swiss Albums (Schweizer Hitparade) | 39 |

| Chart (2008) | Position |
|---|---|
| Austrian Albums (Ö3 Austria) | 7 |
| German Albums (Offizielle Top 100) | 4 |

=== Certifications ===
Certifications for Jazz ist anders
| Region | Certification | Certified units/sales |
|---|---|---|
| Austria (IFPI Austria) | Platinum | 20,000^{*} |
| Germany (BVMI) | 4× Platinum | 800,000^{‡} |
| Switzerland (IFPI Switzerland) | Gold | 15,000^{^} |
^{*} Sales figures based on certification alone.^{^} Shipments figures based on certification alone.^{‡} Sales+streaming figures based on certification alone.

== Economy ==
Jazz ist anders (Economy)

Studio album by Die Ärzte
- Released: 14 November 2007
- Genre: Punk rock
- Length: 48:37
- Label: Hot Action Records
- Producer: Die Ärzte

The "Economy" version CDs were sold on the concerts of the "Es wird eng" and "Jazzfäst" tours. The vinyl version is available from dealers.

On this version there are humorous changed versions of the 16 songs from Jazz ist anders. Also, after the last song, a mangled "Was hat der Junge doch für Nerven" (from Im Schatten der Ärzte) was included as a hidden track.

The CD looks like the backside of a pizza. The CD-Text features different jokes for titles; some are altered titles, some "hidden messages" and some totally disconnected longer jokes. Instead of lyrics, other jokes are present.

Economy versions of the bonus EP songs and some of the B-sides were released as B-sides to Jazz ist anders singles.

== Personnel ==
- Farin Urlaub – guitar, vocals
- Bela Felsenheimer – drums, vocals
- Rodrigo González – bass, vocals
