= Il Mondo =

Il Mondo (Italian for "The World") may refer to:

- Il Mondo (magazine), Italian weekly magazine (1949–2014)
- Il Mondo (newspaper), Italian political newspaper founded in 1922
- "Il mondo" (song), a 1965 song performed by Jimmy Fontana
- "Il Mondo", a card of the Tarocco Piemontese

== See also ==
- Mondo (disambiguation)
