= Hell (Die Ärzte album) =

Studio album by Die Ärzte
- Released: 23 October 2020
- Length: 60:12
- Label: Hot Action
- Producer: Die Ärzte; Oliver Zülch; Philipp Hoppen

Die Ärzte chronology
Die Nacht der Dämonen (2013)	Hell (2020)	Dunkel (2021)

Singles from Hell
- 1. "Morgens pauken" Released: 21 August 2020; 2. "True Romance" Released: 9 October 2020; 3. "Achtung: Bielefeld" Released: 5 February 2021; 4. "Ich, am Strand" Released: 14 May 2021

Hell ("Bright") is the thirteenth full-length studio album by German rock band Die Ärzte. It was released on 23 October 2020.

Professional ratings
Review scores
Source	Rating
Laut.de	4/5 stars
Musikexpress	4.5/6 stars
Metal.de	7/10 stars
Rock Hard	9/10 stars

== Track listing ==
Track listing adapted from Tidal.

No.	Title	Music/Lyrics	Length
1.	"E.V.J.M.F."	Music: Rodrigo González / Lyrics: Farin Urlaub	1:43
2.	"Plan B"	Farin Urlaub	3:19
3.	"Achtung: Bielefeld" (Caution: Bielefeld)	Bela B	3:34
4.	"Warum spricht niemand über Gitarristen?" (Why does no one talk about guitarists?)	Farin Urlaub	3:22
5.	"Morgens Pauken" (Cramming in the morning)	M: González / L: Bela B	4:04
6.	"Das letzte Lied des Sommers" (The last song of summer)	Farin Urlaub	3:20
7.	"Clown aus dem Hospiz" (Clown from the hospice)	Bela B	3:05
8.	"Ich, am Strand" (Me, at the beach)	Farin Urlaub	4:22
9.	"True Romance"	Farin Urlaub	2:50
10.	"Einmal ein Bier" (Once a beer)	Bela B	1:59
11.	"Wer verliert, hat schon verloren" (Whoever loses has already lost)	Farin Urlaub	4:02
12.	"Polyester"	González	4:08
13.	"Fexxo Cigol"	Bela B	3:45
14.	"Liebe gegen Rechts" (Love against (the) right)	Farin Urlaub	2:21
15.	"Alle auf Brille" (All on (the) glasses, implies beating up a person with glasses)	Bela B	3:29
16.	"Thor"	Farin Urlaub	2:28
17.	"Leben vor dem Tod" (Life before Death)	Farin Urlaub	4:05
18.	"Woodburger" (Pun on the german word "Wutbürger")	Farin Urlaub	4:16
Total length:			60:12

== Charts ==
=== Weekly charts ===
Chart performance for Hell
Chart (2020)	Peak position
Austrian Albums (Ö3 Austria)	2
German Albums (Offizielle Top 100)	1
Swiss Albums (Schweizer Hitparade)	2

=== Year-end charts ===
Chart (2020)	Position
Austrian Albums (Ö3 Austria)	23
German Albums (Offizielle Top 100)	4
Swiss Albums (Schweizer Hitparade)	18

Chart (2021)	Position
German Albums (Offizielle Top 100)	34

== Personnel ==
- Farin Urlaub – guitar (all but 9), vocals (1–2, 4–6, 8–11, 14, 16–18), vocoder (5)
- Bela Felsenheimer – drums (all), vocals (3, 5, 7, 13, 15)
- Rodrigo González – bass (all), vocals (5, 12), synthesizer (9)
