= Rock'n'Roll-Übermensch =

2001 single by Die Ärzte

Single by Die Ärzte

from the album Runter mit den Spendierhosen, Unsichtbarer!
- Released: 7 May 2001
- Genre: Dub, rock
- Length: 3:54; 4:47 (album version)
- Label: Hot Action Records
- Songwriters: Dirk Felsenheimer; Rodrigo González
- Producers: Uwe Hoffmann & Die Ärzte

Die Ärzte singles chronology
"Yoko Ono" (2000)	"Rock'n'Roll-Übermensch" (2001)	"Unplugged - Komm zurück/Die Banane" (2002)

"Rock'n'Roll-Übermensch" (also spelled "Rock'n'Roll Übermensch") (Rock'n'roll Superman) is a song by the German rock band Die Ärzte. It is the 18th track and the fourth single from their 2000 album Runter mit den Spendierhosen, Unsichtbarer!.

== Music video ==
The band is performing in a department store. Throughout the song, Bela slowly grows larger and larger until he becomes too large for the stage and eventually bursts through the store's ceiling. The video is shot in a cinema verite style, directed by Philipp Stölzl and Johannes Grebert.

== Track listing ==
1. "Rock'n'Roll-Übermensch (Radio Mix)" (Gonzalez, Felsenheimer) - 3:54
2. "Rock'n'Roll-Übermensch (Jauche's Pina Colada Mix)" (Gonzalez, Felsenheimer) - 5:36
3. "Rock'n'Roll-Übermensch (Circuit Breaker Mix)" (Gonzalez, Felsenheimer) - 5:01
4. "Rock'n'Roll-Übermensch (Lexy & K-Paul's L&P Mix)" (Gonzalez, Felsenheimer) - 5:13
5. "Rock'n'Roll-Übermensch (Al-Haca Megamensch Dub)" (Gonzalez, Felsenheimer) - 4:15
6. "Rock'n'Roll-Übermensch (Teddy Uranus Mix)" (Gonzalez, Felsenheimer) - 5:07
7. "Rock'n'Roll-Übermensch (Star & Emerson Three Bad Kiddaz Mix)" (Gonzalez, Felsenheimer) - 4:57
8. "Rock'n'Roll-Übermensch (Blank & Jones Remix)" (Gonzalez, Felsenheimer) - 6:50
9. "Rock'n'Roll-Übermensch (Video)" (Gonzalez, Felsenheimer) - 3:55

== Personnel ==
- Bela B. - vocals
- Farin Urlaub - bass
- Rodrigo González - synthesizer

== Charts ==
Chart (2001)	Peak position
Germany (GfK)	50
