= Lied vom Scheitern =

Single by Die Ärzte

from the album Jazz ist anders
- Released: 18 January 2008
- Genre: Punk rock
- Length: 3:30
- Label: Hot Action Records
- Songwriter(s): Dirk Felsenheimer
- Producer(s): Die Ärzte

Die Ärzte singles chronology
"Junge" (2007)	"Lied vom Scheitern" (2008)	"Lasse redn" (2008)

"Lied vom Scheitern" (Song about failing) is a song by German rock band Die Ärzte. It's the second track and the second single from their 2007 album Jazz ist anders. The song is about trying to be someone else and failing at it.

== Music video ==
The video depicts the three members of Die Ärzte (Farin Urlaub, Bela B., Rodrigo González) in what appears to be a kidnap situation, set in a typical suburban living room. Bela and Rod are the victims, both are tied up and their mouths are covered with tape. Rod has a bomb strapped to him, the timer of which shows 3 minutes. Farin, the apparent kidnapper puts a pistol on the table between Rod and Bela, switches the bomb's timer on and leaves by ascending the stairs. Bela manages to get hold of a broom and tries to switch off the bomb with it, but pushes the wrong button and the bomb's timer decreases by one minute. He then falls down and uses the carpet to rub the tape off of his mouth, to grab the gun that fell from the table as he did. Using his mouth he throws it into his hands. Bela shoots behind him several times (presumably to disable the bomb) a bullet grazing Rod's cheek and smashing a mirror on the wall. With only 8 seconds is left, he grabs a cartridge case from the ground with his mouth, smiles, as if this were his plan all along, spits it out and hits the correct button as the timer shows 00:01. Farin comes down the stairs clapping, unties Bela, who is then shown replacing Farin in the same situation, suggesting that the activities shown in the video are some sort of game, or contest, to its participants. Instead of the gun placed by Farin, the item placed on the table by Bela is a chainsaw, at which point the screen fades to black.

== Personnel ==
- Bela B. – vocals, drums
- Rodrigo González – vocals (bridge), bass
- Farin Urlaub – guitar

== Track listing ==
1. "Lied vom Scheitern" (Song about failing) – 3:30
2. "Nichts gesehen" (Didn't see anything) – 3:15
3. "Das schönste Lied der Welt (Economy-Version)" (The most beautiful song in the world) – 2:21
4. "Wir sind die Besten (Economy-Version)" (We are the best) – 2:50
5. "Lied vom Scheitern" (video) – 3:38

== Charts ==
Chart (2008)	Chart position
Austria (Ö3 Austria Top 40)	23
Germany (GfK)	7
