= Lasse redn =

Single by Die Ärzte

from the album Jazz ist anders
- Released: 11 April 2008
- Genre: Alternative rock, pop rock, dance-punk
- Length: 2:49
- Label: Hot Action Records
- Songwriter: Farin Urlaub
- Producer: Die Ärzte

Die Ärzte singles chronology
"Lied vom Scheitern" (2008)	"Lasse redn" (2008)	"PerfektBreitHimmelblau" (2009)

"Lasse redn" (colloquial for standard German Lass sie reden, 'Let 'em talk') is a song by the German rock band Die Ärzte. It is the fourth track and the third single released from their 2007 album Jazz ist anders. The song is optimistic about people who gossip about other people, implying that rumours are meaningless.

== Music video ==
In the video, a man (played by Martin Klempnow) mimes what Farin sings, first in a little room and then on a stage where dancers appear. Also tied-up cooks from the cover of "Jazz ist anders" appear on both sides of the stage, which are parodies of the bondage comics heroine Sweet Gwendoline, who has been used as the band's mascot. While on the stage, a woman in a small circle in the corner of the screen is gesturing along with the man miming. The band doesn't appear in the video, except for a while as thumbs with clothes on and faces on them.

== Personnel ==
- Farin Urlaub – guitar, vocals
- Rodrigo González – bass, keyboard
- Bela B. – drums

== Track list ==
1. "Lasse redn" (Let 'em talk) – 2:49
2. "Komm zu Papa" (Come to papa) – 3:52
3. "Nichts gesehen (Economy-Version)" (Didn't see anything) – 1:03
4. "Wir waren die Besten (Economy-Version)" (We were the best) – 4:03
5. "Lasse redn" (video) – 2:50

== Charts ==
=== Weekly charts ===
Chart (2008)	Peak position
Austria (Ö3 Austria Top 40)	3
Germany (GfK)	6
Switzerland (Schweizer Hitparade)	79

=== Year-end charts ===
Chart (2008)	Position
Austria (Ö3 Austria Top 40)	48
Germany (Official German Charts)	64
