= Mondo (drink) =

Fruit-flavored beverage

Mondo Fruit Squeezers
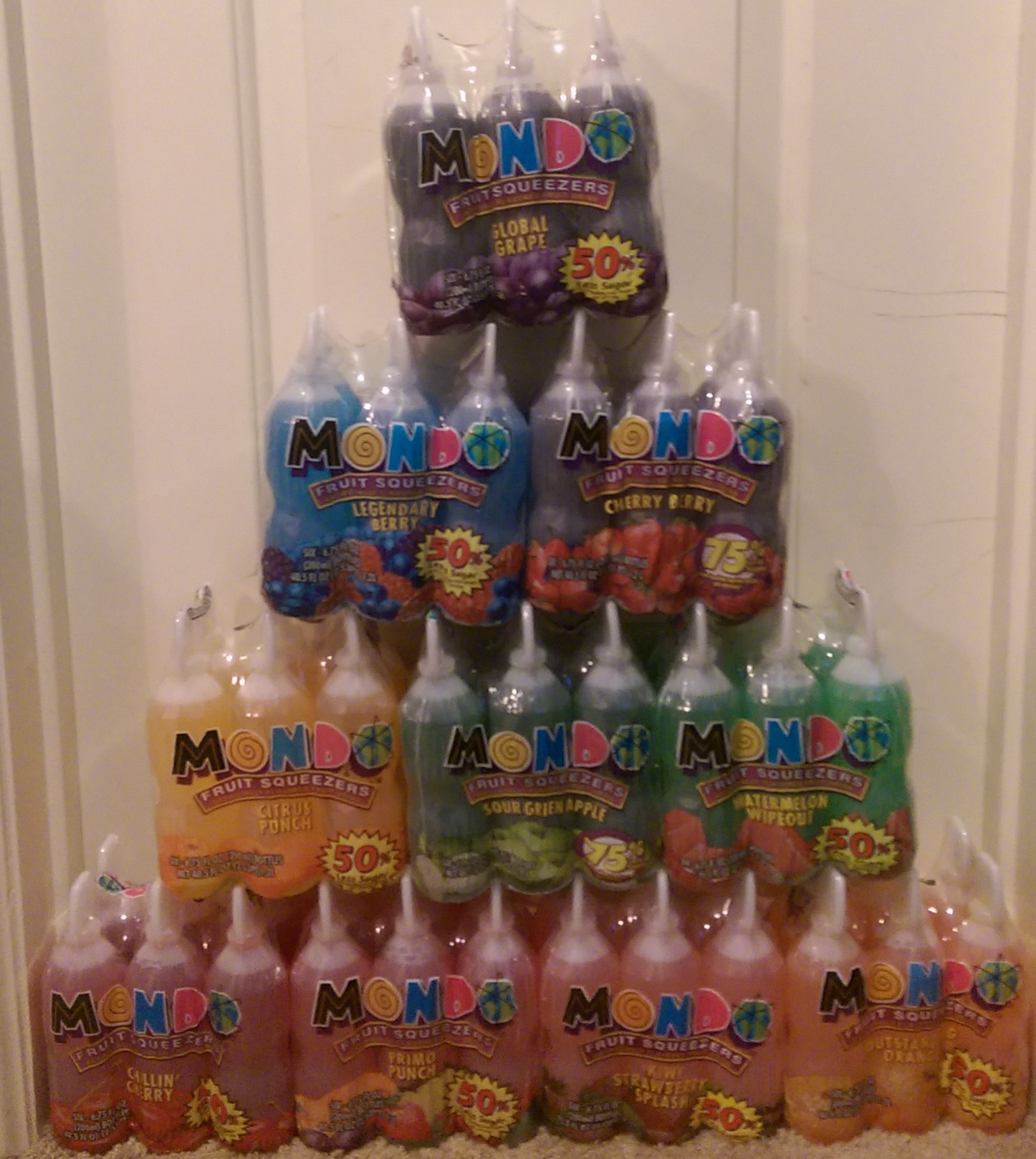
- Mondo drinks stacked in 6 packs from 2015
- Type: Fruit flavored
- Manufacturer: Jel Sert
- Origin: USA
- Introduced: 1991
- Discontinued: 2022
- Flavor: 11 flavors

Mondo was a line of fruit-flavored beverages marketed primarily towards children. Manufactured and distributed by the Jel Sert Company, production of Mondo began in 1991 and ended in 2021 or 2022.

Mondo resembled both Kool-Aid Bursts and the discontinued Betty Crocker Squeezit. The product, referred to as Mondo Fruit Squeezers by the company, was sold in six-packs of 6.75 oz (200 ml) recyclable plastic containers.

== Flavors ==
JelSert produced 11 flavors of Mondo:

- Chillin' Cherry
- Cherry Berry
- Citrus Punch
- Global Grape
- Kiwi Strawberry Splash
- Legendary Berry
- Outstanding Orange
- Pineapple Punch
- Primo Punch
- Sour Green Apple
- Watermelon Wipeout
