= Mondovi =

Mondovi may refer to:

- Mondovì, town in Italy, in the Piemonte
- Battle of Mondovì, battle of the Napoleonic Wars
- Roman Catholic Diocese of Mondovì, in the Ecclesiastical Region of Piedmont
- Mondovi, Wisconsin, city in Buffalo County
- Mondovi (town), Wisconsin, in Buffalo County
- Mondovi, a former name of the town of Dréan in Algeria
- Mondovi, Washington, unincorporated community in Lincoln County

== See also ==
- Mondavi (disambiguation)
