= Junge =

Single by Die Ärzte

from the album Jazz ist anders
- Released: 5 October 2007
- Genre: Punk rock
- Length: 3:07
- Label: Hot Action Records
- Songwriter(s): Farin Urlaub
- Producer(s): Die Ärzte

Die Ärzte singles chronology
"Die klügsten Männer der Welt" (2004)	"Junge" (2007)	"Lied vom Scheitern" (2008)

Junge ("Boy") is a song by German rock band Die Ärzte. It is the sixth track and the first single from their 2007 album Jazz ist anders. It debuted on the radio on 31 August 2007. The song is about teenagers experiencing criticism and rejection and being held responsible for everything.

A Chinese language version of "Junge" was released on the compilation Poptastic Conversation China on 1 August 2008.

== Music video ==
The video for the single, directed by Norbert Heitker, is very graphic and depicts various violent attacks by zombies to town members, while the band Die Ärzte looks on helplessly from the top of a broadcast van and sings about teenagers ruining their lives. The band use a variety of makeshift weapons, such as a guitar, binoculars and a beer can, before a crossbow is produced from out of nowhere in a section that resembles a scene from the 2004 British film Shaun of the Dead. The zombies finally overwhelm the band members and guitarist Farin Urlaub is eaten.

The opening scene, where a bleeding zombie child is walking down the street, is a parody of the opening scene of the film Arlington Road.

There is also a censored version of the single, which is meant to be funny. The zombies' faces are covered with faces (mostly of the band members). The dripping blood in the beginning is blue. Some attack scenes are slightly covered and the worst of the attack scenes are covered by tags with messages like "I wouldn't show this scene to my children either!", "Entertainment has to become more family-friendly!", "This scene is unacceptable. I want to apologise for this!", "Luckily, the video is over now!", "Funny noises ... Are they also on the single?". In the end, the following message is displayed: "The Hot Zombie Action Association monitored the zombie action. No zombies were harmed in the making of this film."

== Track listing ==
1. "Junge" (single version) – 3:06
2. "Das schönste Lied der Welt" – 2:36
3. "Tut mir leid" – 3:27
4. "Junge" (Video ohne Altersbeschränkung) (Video without age restriction) – 3:37

== B-sides ==
- "Das schönste Lied der Welt" (The most beautiful song in the world) is about overcoming sadness and depression by writing the most beautiful song in the world.
- "Tut mir leid" (I'm sorry) is about the consequences of being drunk.

== Personnel ==
- Farin Urlaub – guitar, vocals
- Bela B. – drums
- Rodrigo González – bass

== Charts ==
Country	Chart position
Austria	7
Germany	1
Switzerland	23

=== Year-end charts ===
Chart (2007)	Rank
German Singles Chart	68
