= Himmelblau's function =

Function used as a performance test problem for optimization algorithms

Himmelblau's function

In 3D

Log-spaced level curve plot

In mathematical optimization, Himmelblau's function is a multi-modal function, used to test the performance of optimization algorithms. The function is defined by:

$$f(x, y) = (x^2+y-11)^2 + (x+y^2-7)^2.\quad$$

It has one local maximum at $x = -0.270845$ and $y = -0.923039$ where $f(x,y) = 181.617$, and four identical local minima:

- $f(3.0, 2.0) = 0.0, \quad$
- $f(-2.805118, 3.131312) = 0.0, \quad$
- $f(-3.779310, -3.283186) = 0.0, \quad$
- $f(3.584428, -1.848126) = 0.0. \quad$

The locations of all the minima can be found analytically. However, because they are roots of quartic polynomials, when written in terms of radicals, the expressions are somewhat complicated.

The function is named after David Mautner Himmelblau (1924–2011), who introduced it.

== See also ==
- Test functions for optimization
