= Mondo a go go =

Mondo a go go may refer to:

- Mondo A Go-Go, a mini album by British electronic music band Eat Static
- Mondo A-Go Go, an amusement park seen in the television movie Ed, Edd n Eddy's Big Picture Show
