= Glücklich =

Glücklich is a German surname which means "lucky". Notable people with the surname include:

- Henryk Glücklich (1945–2014), Polish motorcycle speedway rider
- Jens Glücklich (born 1966), German Olympic cyclist
- Vilma Glücklich (1872–1927), Hungarian educational reformer, pacifist and women's rights activist
