= Runter mit den Spendierhosen, Unsichtbarer! =

Studio album by Die Ärzte
- Released: 20 October 2000
- Genre: Punk rock; pop punk
- Length: 63:59
- Label: Hot Action Records
- Producer: Uwe Hoffmann, Die Ärzte

Die Ärzte chronology
Satanische Pferde (1999)	Runter mit den Spendierhosen, Unsichtbarer! (2000)	5, 6, 7, 8 – Bullenstaat! (2001)

Booklet cover

Singles from Runter mit den Spendierhosen, Unsichtbarer!
- 1. "Wie es geht" Released: 21 August 2000; 2. "Manchmal haben Frauen..." Released: 10 November 2000; 3. "Yoko Ono" Released: 5 March 2001; 4. "Rock'n'Roll-Übermensch" Released: 7 May 2001

Professional ratings
Review scores
Source	Rating
laut.de	4/5 stars

Runter mit den Spendierhosen, Unsichtbarer! ("Stop feeling so generous, invisible one!", lit. "Down with the generosity trousers, invisible one!") is a studio album by German rock band Die Ärzte. The package of the album is a plush pocket.

== Album title ==
The album title is a pun on the German idioms:

- "Hosen runter"/"Runter mit den Hosen" ("Show what you got", lit. "Drop your trousers")
- "Spendierhosen anhaben" ("Feeling generous", lit. "Wearing generosity trousers")

== Track listing ==
1. "Wie es geht" ("How it's done") (Urlaub) - 3:58
2. "Geld" ("Money") (Felsenheimer) - 3:44
3. "Gib mir Zeit" ("Give me time") (Urlaub) - 2:08
4. "Dir" ("To you") (Felsenheimer) - 3:39
5. "Mondo Bondage" (Gonzalez/Felsenheimer) - 3:01
6. "Onprangering" ("Denunciation" [corruption of anprangern]) (Urlaub) - 3:53
7. "Leichenhalle" ("Morgue") (Gonzalez/Gonzalez, Urlaub, Felsenheimer) - 3:51
8. "Der Optimist" ("The optimist") (Felsenheimer) - 2:36
9. "Alles so einfach" ("Everything so simple") (Urlaub) - 4:25
10. "N 48.3" (Urlaub) - 2:51
11. "Manchmal haben Frauen..." ("Sometimes women have...") (Felsenheimer) - 4:13
12. "Las Vegas" (Felsenheimer) - 1:49
13. "Yoko Ono" (Urlaub) - 0:30
14. "Rock Rendezvous" (Felsenheimer) - 4:08
15. "Baby" (Urlaub) - 4:32
16. "Kann es sein?" ("Can it be?") (Gonzalez/Felsenheimer) - 2:47
17. "Ein Sommer nur für mich" ("A summer just for me") (Urlaub) - 2:51
18. "Rock'n'Roll-Übermensch" ("Rock'n'roll-superhuman") (Gonzalez, Felsenheimer) - 4:47
19. "Herrliche Jahre" ("Splendid years") (Urlaub) - 3:52

== Lyrical meaning and song notes ==
"Wie es geht"
A song about a lover attempting to uphold a relationship, threatened by his inability to communicate his feelings.
"Geld"
Bela laments the obsession of modern society with money, including an encounter with a woman who only started a relationship with him for money, and a friend whose band 'sold out'. However, at the end when Bela is about to offer a solution, he refuses to tell unless he is being paid for it.
"Gib mir Zeit"
Farin asks for a little bit of time to clear his head and realize his actual feelings regarding his current relationship and possibly having fallen in love with a new woman.
"Dir"
A song about the various and often highly contradictory feelings when in love.
"Mondo Bondage"
A song about sexual bondage practices, similar to the band's earlier song "Sweet, Sweet Gwendoline", which this song references alongside Bettie Page.
"Onprangering"
Farin explains a number of different situations and his dissatisfaction with it, including him having a sexually transmitted disease, scurvy, and leprosy. The song is filled with forced rhymes, with several consonants being stretched to rhyme with different lines.
"Leichenhalle"
Sung from the viewpoint of a goth who wakes up in a morgue. At the end of the song he asks the corpses around him where they're from. They answer that they are from Smurf village with the song going into an allusion to The Song of the Smurfs by Father Abraham.
"Der Optimist"
A song about various topics as viewed from an eternal optimist, who is not aware of the real situations.
"Alles so einfach"
A laid back Ska song who juxtaposes to the previous song explaining that all the problems can't be solved easily.
"N 48.3"
A song played in a very fast psychobilly style. Farin attempts to pick up various women at a discothèque, only to have various occurrences stop him just as they are about to have sex. "N 48.3" is the ICD-10 code for priapism (a long, painful erection).
"Manchmal haben Frauen..."
The narrator encounters a drunk at a bar, who tells him that some women want to be physically punished on occasion. When he returns to his girlfriend, he is brutally beat down with the justification that people like him always deserve to be beaten.
"Las Vegas"
An ode to Las Vegas sung with a faux American accent reminiscent of the Elvis Presley song "Viva Las Vegas".
"Yoko Ono"
The song exclaims the displeasure of the narrator with his girlfriend, listing her shortcomings and finally declaring her to be worse than Yoko Ono, who has been blamed with breaking up The Beatles. At 30 seconds, it is one of the shortest singles ever released.
"Rock Rendezvous"
In the first verse Bela confesses his physical attraction to Farin. The second verse has Farin return this affection. In the third verse Rod exclaims his disgust with the two and exclaim that homosexuality is sin, only to be converted by the other two.
"Baby"
A satirical encouragement to leave pigs and lambs alone and instead eat people (cf. the classic satire A Modest Proposal).
"Kann es sein?"
A song of encouragement for a lover to finally confess his love rather than be a distant admirer.
"Ein Sommer nur für mich"
The song questions whether Neo-Nazis experience joy and are allowed to enjoy a nice summer day.
"Rock'n'Roll-Übermensch"
Sung from the perspective of four different narrators (or one entity morphing into four different forms) explain their motivation. The narrators are an evangelist, a Star Trek nerd, a male cat, and an extraterrestrial come to destroy the planet. The song is played in a slow plodding beat, and heavy voice modulation is used for the vocals during the final verse sung from the perspective of the alien. The verse from the perspective of the nerd is cut from the radio edit released as a single.
"Herrliche Jahre"
The song tells the story of a man who only experiences misery. Life is a party for all but him.

== Singles ==
- 2000: "Wie es geht"
- 2000: "Manchmal haben Frauen..."
- 2001: "Yoko Ono"
- 2001: "Rock'n'Roll-Übermensch"

== Personnel ==
- Farin Urlaub - guitar, vocals
- Bela Felsenheimer - drums, vocals
- Rodrigo González - bass guitar, vocals
- Diane Weigmann - additional vocals on 11
