= PerfektBreitHimmelblau =

Single by Die Ärzte

from the album Jazz ist anders
- Released: 4 December 2009
- Genre: Punk rock
- Label: Hot Action Records
- Songwriter(s): Bela B./Farin Urlaub/Rodrigo González
- Producer(s): Die Ärzte

Die Ärzte singles chronology
"Lasse redn" (2008)	"PerfektBreitHimmelblau" (2009)	"'zeiDverschwÄndung'" (2012)

PerfektBreitHimmelblau
- Vinyl cover and CD inlay

"Perfekt"

Song by Die Ärzte

from the album Jazz ist anders
- Released: 2007
- Genre: Punk rock
- Length: 2:35
- Label: Hot Action Records
- Songwriter(s): Bela B.
- Producer(s): Die Ärzte

"Breit"

Song by Die Ärzte

from the album Jazz ist anders
- Released: 2007
- Genre: Punk rock
- Length: 3:14
- Label: Hot Action Records
- Songwriter(s): Rodrigo González/Farin Urlaub
- Producer(s): Die Ärzte

"Himmelblau"

Song by Die Ärzte

from the album Jazz ist anders
- Released: 2007
- Genre: Punk rock
- Length: 3:16
- Label: Hot Action Records
- Songwriter(s): Farin Urlaub
- Producer(s): Die Ärzte

"PerfektBreitHimmelblau" ("Perfect Stoned Sky-blue") are three songs and a triple A-side-single by the German rock band Die Ärzte. The songs are tracks 8, 3 and 1 of their 2007 album Jazz ist anders.

== Track listings ==
The track listing is different by any CD. On the back cover the songs are in this order:

1. Perfekt - 2:35
2. Himmelblau - 3:16
3. Breit - 3:14
4. PerfektHimmelblauBreit (Flash game with the music-video)

=== Other track listings ===
1. Perfekt
2. Breit
3. Himmelblau
1. Himmelblau
2. Perfekt
3. Breit
1. Himmelblau
2. Breit
3. Perfekt
1. Breit
2. Perfekt
3. Himmelblau
1. Breit
2. Himmelblau
3. Perfekt

== Video ==
The video is divided into three parts; there is a separate video for every song, but they all follow the same concept: They are set in Berlin in the year 2046, in a modern nursing home. Bela is 84, Farin 83, Rodrigo 78 years old.

The videos can already be distinguished at the beginning: In "Himmelblau" there is a turquoise jet-car, in "Breit" a dark green one, and in "Perfekt" a dark red one.
All three videos start with two doctors pushing a trolley up to a door and then entering a code. When the door opens, you see a computer with name, age and status. Instead of the actual status, there is the title of the song. Then two doctors give a medical ampoule to the performers.

"Himmelblau" stars Farin Urlaub, "Perfekt" Bela B., "Breit" Rodrigo González as old men. The two names of the doctors are "Bernd" and "Mandy".

- Bernd refers to the line: "...Doch dann kam Bernd mit dem Zeugs verbei..." (... but then came Bernd with the good stuff...) in the song "Breit"
- Mandy refers to the line: "...Oh, Mandy. Die kleine Candy-Mandy..." (...Oh Mandy, the little candy-Mandy!...) in the song "Perfekt"

The video premiere was on 17 November 2009 at 5.30 pm on MTV.

=== Flash game ===
In the flash game one is able to select a musician (Farin Urlaub=light, Rodrigo González=medium, Bela B.=difficult) and with a right-click the musician attacks a doctor with his instrument (Farin with his guitar, Rod with his bass, Bela with his drum sticks). At the end you stand in front of the door to your room and the score is shown on the door.

== Vinyl version ==
The vinyl is a 12-inch picture disc with a built-in "random generator".

Instead of a usual single groove that spirals from the rim to the middle of the vinyl, this is a triple helix-groove, i.e. three parallel grooves, each consisting of one song. If the listener has the cartridge, he can not control what song is played.

On the B-side is the video in "still image version" which means that there is print a screenshot of the video.

== Track listing ==
A-side

1. PerfektBreitHimmelblau (mit eingebautem Zufallsgenerator) [with built-in random generator]

B-side

1. PerfektBreitHimmelblau video (Standbild-version) ["still image version"]

== Other names ==
Because of the front cover and the different track listings the single is called by different names:

- PerfektBreitHimmelblau
- PerfektHimmelblauBreit
- HimmelblauPerfektBreit
- BreitHimmelblauPerfekt

The video is in the order: "Perfekt", "Himmelblau", "Breit"

== Personnel ==
=== Perfekt ===
- Bela B. - vocals, drums
- Farin Urlaub - guitar
- Rodrigo González - bass

=== Breit ===
- Rodrigo González - vocals, bass
- Farin Urlaub - guitar
- Bela B. - drums

=== Himmelblau ===
- Farin Urlaub - vocals, guitar
- Bela B. - drums
- Rodrigo González - bass

== Charts ==
Chart (2009)	Peak position
German Singles Chart	26
