= Rodrigo González (musician) =

German musician

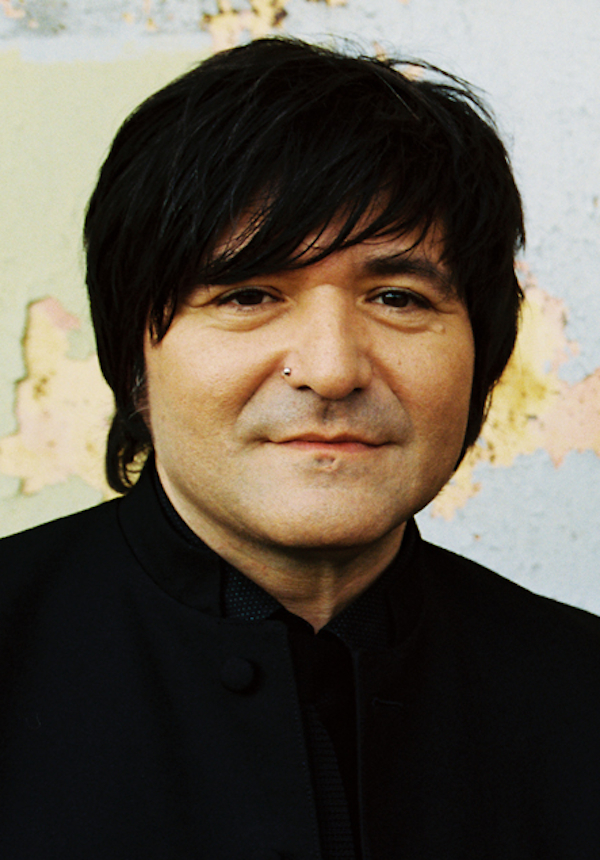
- González in 2012

Background information
- Also known as: The Rod
- Born: Rodrigo Andrés González Espíndola; 19 May 1968 (age 58); Valparaíso, Chile
- Origin: Hamburg, Germany
- Genres: Rock, punk rock
- Instruments: Bass; vocals; guitar; keyboard; synthesizer; banjo
- Member of: Die Ärzte
- Formerly of: Depp Jones; Rainbirds; Die Goldenen Zitronen
- Website: rodarmy.org

Rodrigo "Rod" Andrés González Espíndola (born 19 May 1968) is a Chilean-born German musician known as the bassist and one of the singers of German rock band Die Ärzte.

== Early life ==
González's parents were politically persecuted in Chile during the Pinochet dictatorship, and so were granted asylum in Hamburg. His family initially lived there on social benefits until his father found work. He completed his Abitur (school-leaving exams) at the Gymnasium Langenhorn. He has an older sister, Claudia, who also works as a musician (Universal González).

As a teenager, González was a member of the band Die Erben. From 1986 to 1988, he played banjo in the Hamburg punk band Die Goldenen Zitronen, and from 1988 to 1989 he was the guitarist in the Rainbirds.

== Career ==
=== Career with Depp Jones and Die Ärzte ===
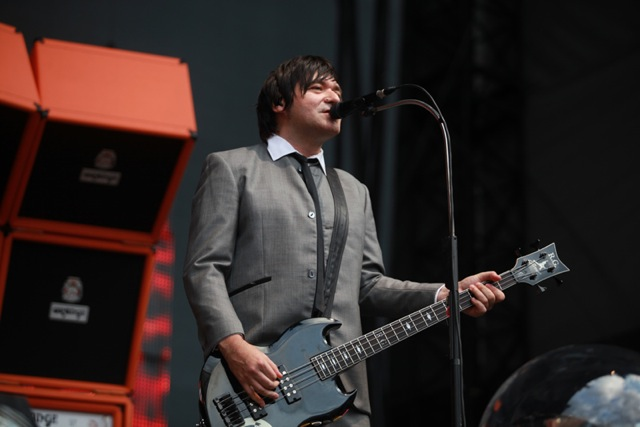
González playing bass for Die Ärzte, 2013

González became friends with the Die Ärzte drummer, Bela B., when they sang a Kiss song together in a bar while drunk. González was also a member of the so-called 'KISS Army'. Bela B. quickly began to value González' musical talent. They played together in the band S.U.M.P., which later changed its name to Depp Jones, following the (temporary) break-up of Die Ärzte in 1988.

After failing to achieve commercial success, Depp Jones split up in 1992. When Die Ärzte got back together in 1993, González became their new band member. Although he had been the guitarist in Depp Jones, he became the bassist in Die Ärzte. While the last Die Ärzte bassist prior to the break-up, Hagen Liebing, had only been a hired band member, González has been a full-fledged member of Die Ärzte since joining the band.

González has penned the Die Ärzte singles "1/2 Lovesong" and "Dinge von denen", among others. At the songs he sings, him and Urlaub traditionally swap instruments.

Alongside bass and guitar, he has also taught himself to play the drums, keyboard and piano. The other members of Die Ärzte therefore jokingly refer to him as "over-qualified". During the MTV Unplugged concert Rock'n'Roll Realschule, which took place in 2002 in the Albert-Schweitzer-Gymnasium in Hamburg, González was the musical director and arranger for most of the songs performed.

=== Other musical projects ===
González works as a producer for various bands and other artists, such as Lucilectric, Knorkator and Panda. He is also the co-owner of Rodrec, a record company, through which both Depp Jones albums were re-released and to which the artists Rantanplan, Church of Confidence, and Abwärts are signed. González has also played guitar with Abwärts since 2004.

During the live concert Fußballfans gegen Rechts (Football Fans Against Right-Wing Extremism) on 30 January 1993 in the Zakk Club, Düsseldorf, González played in the punk band Slime as a stand-in. He covered the Kiss song "I'll Fight Hell to Hold You" in 2001, turning it into a disco track and singing in the Bee Gees style.

In 2005, González and Bela B. (as Zwei Fickende Hunde) recorded the song "Meister aller Fotzen" by Die Kassierer for the CD Kunst to celebrate 20 years of the Wattenscheid punk band.
