= Dendemann =

German rapper (born 1974)

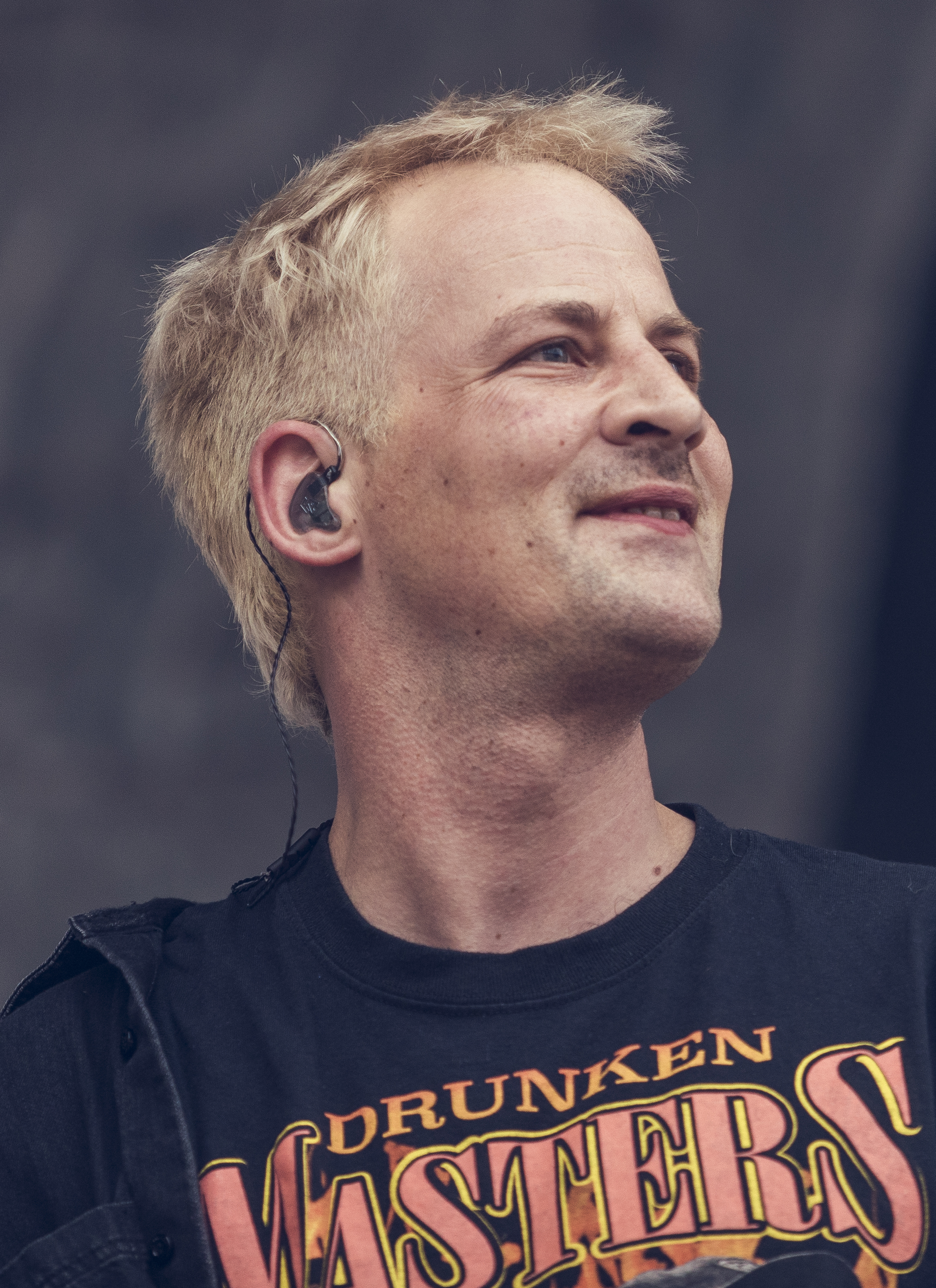
- Dendemann in 2019

Background information
- Also known as: Daniel LaRusso; Volker Racho; Olaf Mitender
- Born: Daniel Ebel; 27 June 1974 (age 52); Wickede, West Germany
- Origin: Menden, Germany
- Genre: German hip hop
- Label: Yo Mama
- Formerly of: Eins Zwo
- Website: dendemann.de

Daniel Ebel (born 27 June 1974), better known as Dendemann, is a German rapper. He is known for his rough voice and his witty, wordplay-filled lyrics in which he mostly tells stories from everyday life.

== Biography ==
Born in Wickede, Dendemann was raised in Menden and later relocated to Hamburg in 1996. His first success was with the crew Arme Ritter, who often functioned as support for Fettes Brot and were featured on their album außen Top Hits, innen Geschmack. Arme Ritter had previously released a single called Disco '95 on Sony Music, but to little avail. In the mid-1990s, Dendemann and Thomas "Rabauke" Jensen, the tour DJ of Fettes Brot, founded the hip hop duo Eins Zwo. At the same time, Dendemann was working with the former Arme Ritter artist Majubiese and his friend Nico Suave, under the alias Mutter Natur.

In 2003, Eins Zwo disbanded and both Dendemann and Rabauke are pursuing their solo careers. In the same year, Dendemann release the EP DasSchweigenDilemma, for which he produced the beats himself.

His album Die Pfütze des Eisbergs was published on 1 September 2006, the instrumentals were produced by Jansen & Kowalski and the Audiotreats. The video to the single 3½ Minuten parodies music and video of D'Angelo's song "Untitled (How Does It Feel)" - Dendemann shaved his head and wore fake rubber muscles to imitate D'Angelo's looks and stature.

Dendemann toured Germany during 2007 and 2008 as supporting act for the Beatsteaks and Herbert Grönemeyer in big stadiums all through Germany. The live-album abersowasvonlive was released on 18 July 2008, featuring songs from Die Pfütze des Eisbergs as well as rare B-sides and a new track.

His current album Vom Vintage verweht was published on 9 April 2010 alongside the single Stumpf ist Trumpf 3.0. The album is more rock-oriented than the previous, and was produced by Moses Schneider, who also produces the Beatsteaks.

From January 2015 to December 2016, Dendemann worked as the musical director and band leader for the weekly satire comedy series Neo Magazin Royale hosted by Jan Böhmermann, which airs on ZDF and was originally only aired on ZDFneo under the name Neo Magazin.

== Discography ==
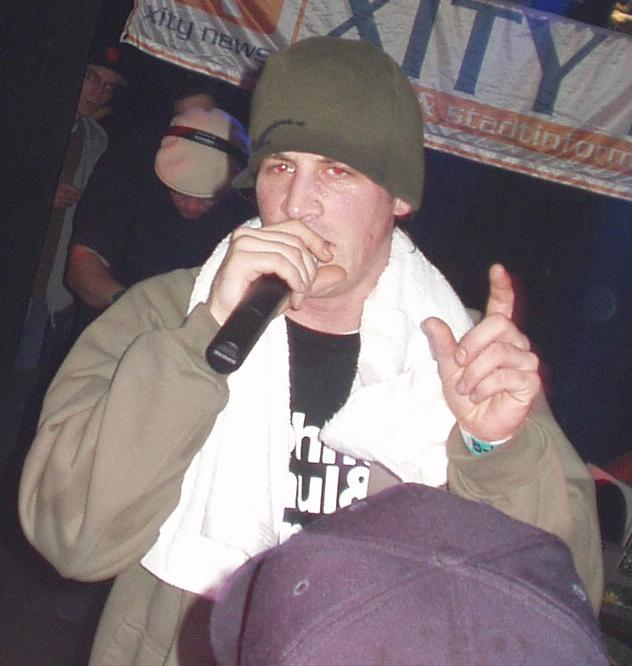
Dendemann performing in 2005

For releases with Eins Zwo, see Eins Zwo#Discography.

=== Albums ===
- 2006: Die Pfütze des Eisbergs (Yo Mama)
- 2008: Abersowasvonlive (Yo Mama)
- 2010: Vom Vintage verweht (Yo Mama)
- 2019: Da nich für! (Vertigo Berlin)

=== Singles ===
- 2003: "DasSchweigenDilemma" (EP) (Yo Mama)
- 2006: "3½ Minuten" (Yo Mama)
- 2007: "Endlich Nichtschwimmer" (Yo Mama)
- 2010: "Stumpf ist Trumpf 3.0" (Yo Mama)

=== Features ===
- 1996: "... Und ich geh nicht zum Arzt" (as Arme Ritter with Fettes Brot on Außen Top Hits, Innen Geschmack by Fettes Brot)
- 1998: "Es ist nicht so, wie du denkst" (on the soundtrack to Fatih Akin's film Short Sharp Shock)
- 1998: "Susanne zur Freiheit" (Single from Fischmob's album Power)
- 1998: "Dein Herz Schlägt Schneller (Remix)" (Fünf Sterne Deluxe single; with I.L.L. Will)
- 1999: "Schnappsidee" (DJ Thomilla single; with Wasi)
- 1999: "3D" (with Samy Deluxe; on Doppelkopf's album Von Abseits)
- 1999: "Bonustrack" (as Mutter Natur on Spiegelbilder by MajuBiese)
- 1999: "K Zwo" (with Das Bo, Falk, Samy Deluxe, Ferris MC and Illo on Beginner's 12" "Füchse/K Zwo")
- 2000: "DD im Haus" (on Dynamite Deluxe's album Deluxe Soundsystem)
- 2000: "T2wei" (with Nico Suave on Deichkind's album Bitte ziehen Sie durch)
- 2001: "Einer von Ihnen" (with Nico Suave on DJ Friction's album Alarmstufe Rot)
- 2001: "Jugendsünden" (with Manuva on Nico Suave's album Suave)
- 2001: "Session" (with Illo and Nico Suave on the album Samy Deluxe)
- 2002: "Kurzschluss" (on Moqui Marbles' album Das Teredeum)
- 2002: "Irgendwas" (on Chima's album Reine Glaubenssache)
- 2002: "Siebenschläfer" (on Roey Marquis II's album Herzessenz)
- 2002: "Mythos - Headz hoch" (with Tefla & Jaleel on the sampler Splash! Masterblaster 2002)
- 2002: "Cro & Pontra" (on I.L.L. Will's album LP, Nicht Vollständig)
- 2002: "Backstagepass" (on Tefla & Jaleel's album Direkt Neben Dir)
- 2004: "God is a music (Tropf-Remix)" (on Beginner's single Morgen Freeman)
- 2004: "Beat a i já und ich" (on Prago Union's album "HDP")
- 2005: "Tut mir leid" (Single from J-Luvs album Threeshot - Hip Hop Kingz)
- 2006: "Das verbotene Z-Wort" (on the Kool DJ GQ Album Birth of Kool)
- 2006: "King Promo" (on Curse's single "Struggle")
- 2006: "Für immer und dich (Tropf-Remix)" (on Jan Delay's single Für immer und dich)
- 2016: "So schön" (Single from Beginner's album Advanced Chemistry)
