= Tanzverbot =

Tanzverbot may refer to:

- A dancing ban, which in German is called a "Tanzverbot"
- Tanzverbot (Schill to Hell), a song by the German hip-hop group Fettes Brot and rock musician Bela B.
- Tanzverbot, a German YouTuber with over 1 million subscribers.
