= Marcel Eger =

German footballer

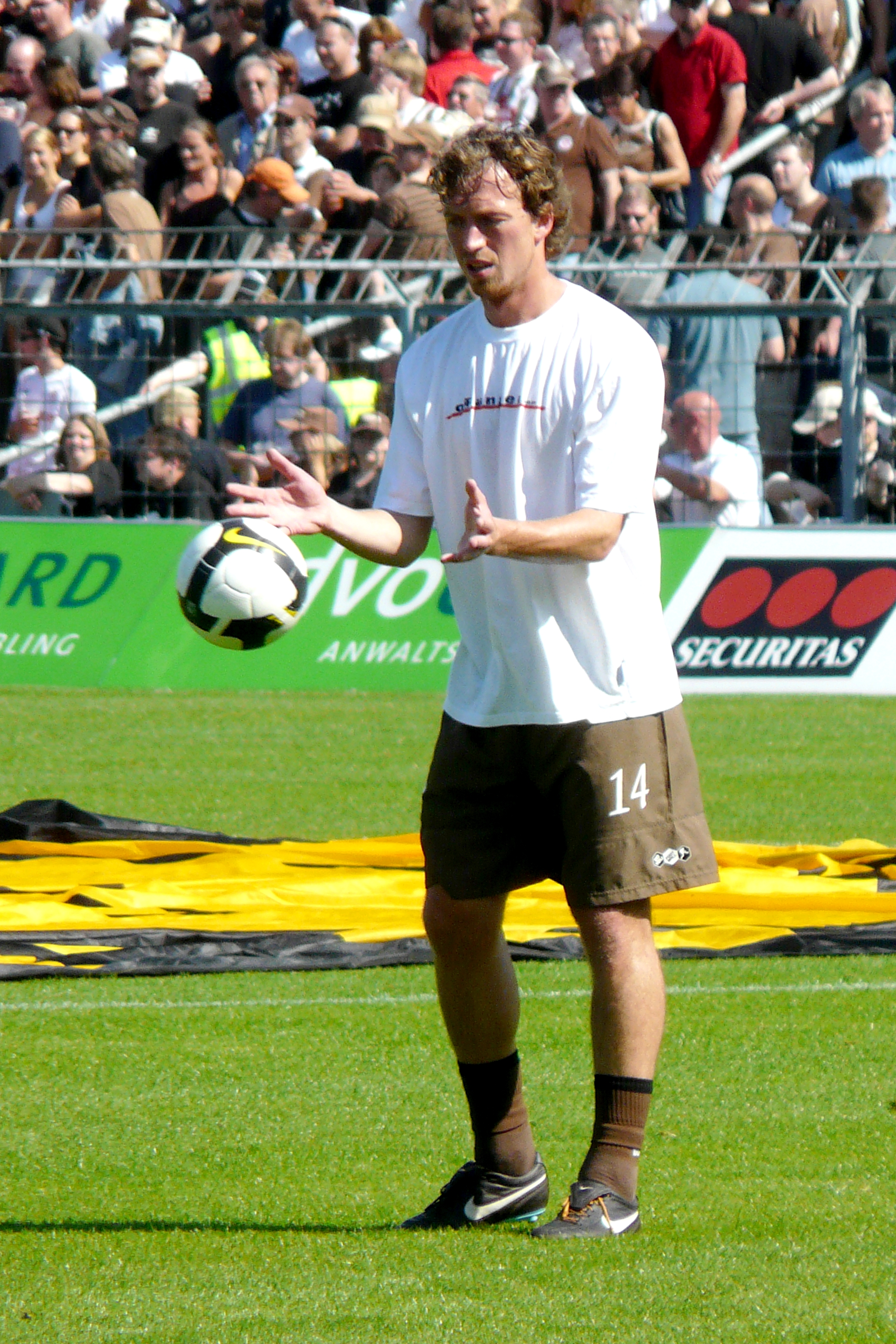
- Eger with FC St. Pauli in 2008

Personal information
- Full name: Marcel Eger
- Date of birth: 23 March 1983 (age 43)
- Place of birth: Sachsen bei Ansbach, West Germany
- Height: 1.90 m (6 ft 3 in)
- Position: Defender

Youth career
- 1. FC Sachsen
- SpVgg Ansbach
- –2003: 1. FC Nürnberg

Senior career*
Years	Team	Apps	(Gls)
2001–2003	1. FC Nürnberg II	27	(2)
2003–2004	1. SC Feucht	26	(1)
2004–2011	FC St. Pauli	131	(8)
2009–2010	FC St. Pauli II	10	(0)
2011–2012	Brentford	16	(0)
Total		210	(11)
- * Club domestic league appearances and goals

Marcel Eger (born 23 March 1983) is a German former professional footballer who played as a defender, making over 130 appearances for FC St. Pauli.

== Career ==
=== Early career ===
Eger played in the youth teams of 1. FC Sachsen, SpVgg Ansbach and 1. FC Nürnberg where he played until 2003 when he moved to 1. SC Feucht. He made his debut for the club in a 1–1 draw against 1. FC Saarbrücken on 2 August 2003, coming on a substitute late in the match for Stefan Hampl and made his first start in a 0–0 draw against FC Augsburg. Since making his debut, he established himself in the first team. On 15 November 2003, Eger scored his first goal for the club in a 2–0 win over FC Schweinfurt 05. At SC Feucht, he made 26 appearances scoring one goal.

=== FC St. Pauli ===
After one season at SC Feucht, Eger joined St. Pauli on a free transfer. On 31 July 2004, he made his debut for the club in a 1–0 win over Wuppertaler SV Borussia playing 90 minutes. On 11 December 2004, he received a red card for brutal foul, just 10 minutes coming on as a substitute in a 2–0 win over Holstein Kiel. On 5 April 2005, he made his return to the first-team in a 1–0 win over Hamburger SV II. On 26 March 2005, he scored his first goal for the club in a 4–1 win over Arminia Bielefeld.

On 6 August 2005, Eger scored his first of the 2005–06 season in a 4–0 win over Kickers Emden. On 23 August 2005, he received a red card after second bookable offence in a 2–0 loss against Fortuna Düsseldorf.

The following season 2006–07, Eger made 35 appearances, playing all the league matches of the season and having a key role at the club that was promoted to 2. Bundesliga.

In the 2007–08 season, Eger made 30 appearances.

The following season, Eger started on 8 August 2008 in a match against Erzgebirge Aue in the DFB-Pokal receiving a straight red card in a 5–4 loss. He made 29 appearances in that season.

In the following 2009–10 season, Eger made three appearances and received little playing time with centre-back pair Fabio Morena and Markus Thorandt keeping him out of the first team. Instead, he spent most of the season on the bench and while his first-team time was limited, he played in the reserves. During the season, Eger suffered hip problems in the start of the season. By the end of the season, the team secured promotion back to the Bundesliga for the 2010–11 season, finishing in second place.

In 2010–11, Eger again did not enjoy much playing time and spent most of the season on the bench. On 5 March 2011, he made his Bundesliga debut in a 5–0 defeat against his former youth side 1. FC Nürnberg. On 7 May 2011, he scored his first Bundesliga goal in an 8–1 loss against Bayern Munich. At the end of the season, the club finished in last place, resulting in the club's relegation to the 2. Bundesliga. Eger was released by the club as the club planned to re-build the squad. After his release, president Stefan Orth said releasing him was not easy.

=== Brentford ===
On 24 June 2011, Eger signed for League One side Brentford on a two-year contract, with the option to extend after two years. He said in an interview that it was 'a dream come true to play in England'. On 6 August 2011, he made his debut for the club in a 2–0 win over Yeovil Town playing 90 minutes as centre-back. However, he received little playing time throughout the season. At the end of the season, Eger left Brentford.

== Personal life ==
Eger is a passionate drummer, which showed when he made a guest appearance in Bela B's second solo album Code B. He was even on the single from Black/White, represented in the German charts peaked at 83rd. Eger holds left-wing views on politics.

== Career statistics ==
Appearances and goals by club, season and competition
Club	Season	League			National cup		League cup		Other		Total	
Club	Season	Division	Apps	Goals	Apps	Goals	Apps	Goals	Apps	Goals	Apps	Goals
1. FC Nürnberg Amateure	2000–01	Bayernliga	1	0	—		—		—		1	0
1. FC Nürnberg Amateure	2001–02	Bayernliga	2	0	—		—		—		2	0
1. FC Nürnberg Amateure	2002–03	Bayernliga	24	2	—		—		—		24	2
1. FC Nürnberg Amateure	Total		27	2	0	0	0	0	0	0	27	2
1. SC Feucht	2003–04	Regionalliga Süd	26	1	—		—		—		26	1
FC St. Pauli	2004–05	Regionalliga Nord	19	1	0	0	—		0	0	19	1
FC St. Pauli	2005–06	Regionalliga Nord	12	1	1	0	—		0	0	13	1
FC St. Pauli	2006–07	Regionalliga Nord	34	0	1	0	—		0	0	35	0
FC St. Pauli	2007–08	2. Bundesliga	28	4	2	0	—		0	0	30	4
FC St. Pauli	2008–09	2. Bundesliga	28	1	1	0	—		0	0	29	1
FC St. Pauli	2009–10	2. Bundesliga	3	0	0	0	—		0	0	3	0
FC St. Pauli	2010–11	Bundesliga	7	1	0	0	—		0	0	7	1
FC St. Pauli	Total		131	8	5	0	0	0	0	0	136	8
FC St. Pauli II	2009–10	Regionalliga Nord	5	0	—		—		—		5	0
FC St. Pauli II	2010–11	Oberliga Hamburg	5	0	—		—		—		5	0
FC St. Pauli II	Total		10	0	0	0	0	0	0	0	10	0
Brentford	2011–12	League One	16	0	1	0	1	0	4 (Note: Appearances in Football League Trophy)	0	22	0
Career total			210	11	6	0	1	0	4	0	221	11
