= Tasteless =

The term tasteless can refer to:

- A piece of food with an unpleasant or insipid taste
- An idea that does not fall within normal social standards; see the section on Bad taste in aesthetics
- An alias for Nick Plott, American esports commentator.

== See also ==
- Bad taste (disambiguation)
