= Fettes Brot =

German hip hop group (1992–2023)

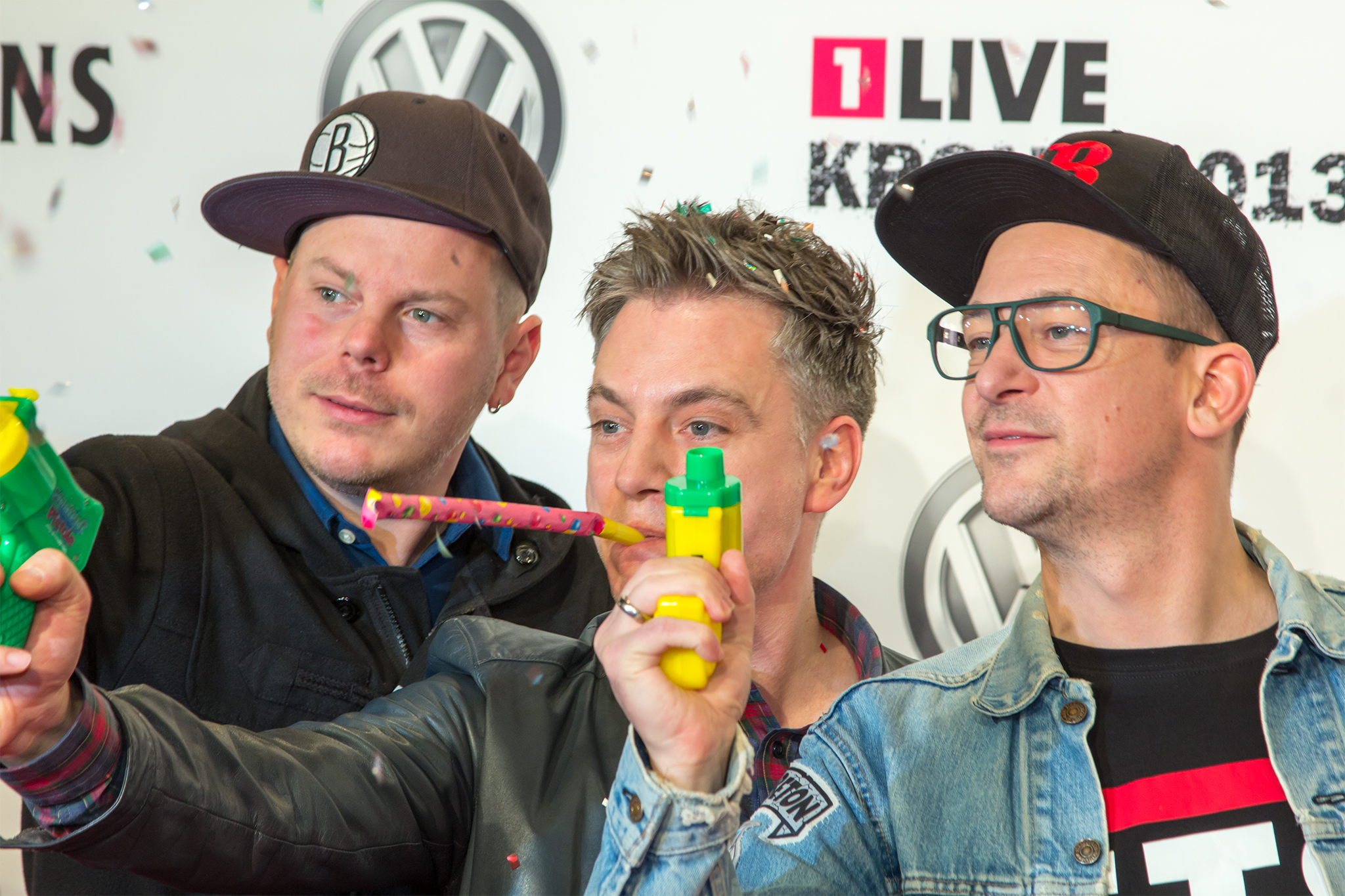
- L-R: Boris Lauterbach, Martin Vandreier, Björn Warns (2013)

Background information
- Origin: Hamburg, Germany
- Genres: German hip hop, pop rap
- Years active: 1992–2023
- Label: Fettes Brot Schallplatten
- Past members: Martin Vandreier; Boris Lauterbach; Björn Warns
- Website: fettesbrot.de

Fettes Brot (German pronunciation: [ˈfɛtəs ˈbʁoːt]) was a German hip hop group that formed in 1992. In August, 2022 they announced to end their career by the end of 2023.

== History ==
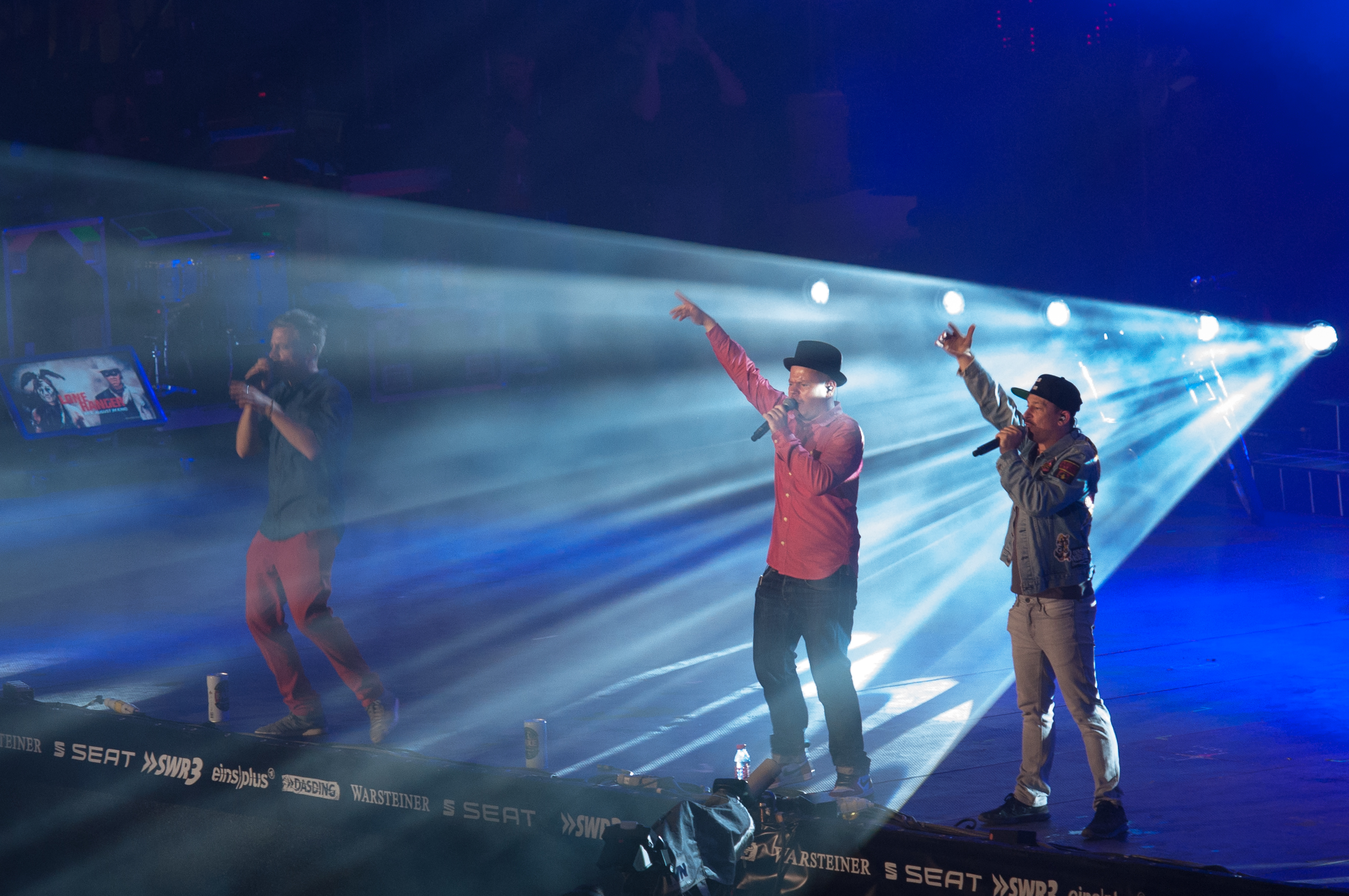
Fettes Brot at Rock am Ring 2013

=== Band name ===
Fettes Brot means fat bread in German. "Fett" is a German slang term for "excellent" and brot is slang for "hash". The band took the name from a fan who called them "Fettes Brot" after an early gig, which was probably meant as a compliment, but the members considered it so bizarre that they took it as the name for their new group. Fettes Brot's longevity has meant that they are sometimes referred to as "Hamburg's hip hop dinosaurs" by the group members.

=== Success with Nordisch by Nature and Jein ===
When the group Poets of Peeze disbanded in 1992, its members Dokter Renz (Martin Vandreier) and Tobi Tobsen together with König ("king") Boris (Boris Lauterbach), Schiffmeister (Björn Warns), and Mighty founded Fettes Brot. The Schmidt brothers (Tobi and Mighty) left the newly founded band early on to pursue other projects, and the band released their first album, the EP Mitschnacker, on Yo Mama Records as a trio. Prior to Mitschnacker, the songs "Schwarzbrot – Weißbrot" ("Blackbread – Whitebread") and "Schule der Gewalt" ("School of Violence") appeared on the sampler Endzeit 93, released via the independent record label Wilde Welt Records.

The group's first commercial success first came with the single "Nordisch by Nature" ("Nordic by Nature") and the album from which the single comes. The song begins with the sound of a foghorn and is performed in parts in "Hamburger Platt" (Hamburg Low) north German dialect, a strong Low German accent, and in Danish, which has made the song something of an anthem in Northern Germany. The single remained in the German charts for a full month, but the band was determined not to let this initial commercial success become a one-hit wonder.

The group demonstrated their technical maturity with their first LP Auf einem Auge blöd ("Stupid in one eye", a parody of the phrase Auf einem Auge blind meaning "Blind in one eye"), which boasts versatile and humorous lyrics. The narrated stories and interwoven raps were received very well.

A year later Fettes Brot released their second biggest commercial hit and quasi-anthem "Jein" (a blend of Ja and Nein, meaning both "Yes" and "No"). The main line of the song's chorus asks the question: "Soll ich's wirklich machen oder lass ich's lieber sein?" ("Should I really do it or should I leave it?") and led to a strong fanbase being established in German speaking countries. Further singles included "Außen Top Hits, innen Geschmack" (a play on a popular commercial jingle for the aluminum foil Toppits: "Außen Toppits – innen Geschmack" ("Toppits on the outside – flavor within") where the similar-sounding album title means "Top hits on the outside – taste within") were just as successful.

Rapper Dendemann (then a member of Arme Ritter, meaning "Poor Knights" but also "French toast") had his first introduction to the mainstream in his collaboration track "Wildwechsel", also with Max Herre, Blumentopf, Spax (German) and Der Tobi & das Bo (German), which became representative of these artists. Fettes Brot were at this time very active in other areas: For instance, they created a unique radio transmission called Forellentee for Radio Fritz (German).

=== Change of direction ===
After their initial success, the group began to experiment with a softer sound and released the single "Können diese Augen lügen?" ("Could These Eyes Lie?") from the album Fettes Brot lässt grüßen ("Fettes Brot Says Hello"). Many purists voiced criticism as the band explored new paths and no longer focused on a pure hip hop music style. The songs "Viele Wege führen nach Rom" ("Many Roads Lead to Rome") and "Lieblingslied" ("Favourite Song") were successful as a double A-sided single and become an even bigger hit than both previous albums.

With the cooperation of James Last, the trio took a break from songwriting in 1999 and embarked on a creative pause. The break was announced to fans with via the publishing of an anthology of B-sides, remixes, and some exclusive material. Beginner, and Smudo of Die Fantastischen Vier, as well as Der Tobi & Das Bo made personal contributions to this anthology. Furthermore, the widely successful single "Da draußen" ("Out there") was released as a collectors edition in 2000.

After three years, in 2001, the fourth Fettes Brot album was released. The trio marketed a small comeback with the title Demotape using new alternative pseudonyms. The hit singles "Schwule Mädchen" and "The Grosser" could not be clearly categorized into a musical style. Additionally they released a collaboration with Skunk Funk (German), a pure hip hop single called "Fast 30" ("Almost 30"). Only a year later, in early 2002, they released their greatest hits compilation Amnesie ("Amnesia") and a DVD of the same name with extra short films. Three more singles were released, beginning in 2002 with "Welthit" ("World Hit"), from their greatest hits CD. In 2003, they released the Rio Reiser cover "Ich bin müde" ("I'm Tired"), which received extensive exposure on television. They made the collaboration "Tanzverbot" ("Dancing Prohibition") available as a legal MP3 download (as well as a limited CD and vinyl run), as part of the Hamburg Bambule (German) protest alongside Bela B. against the Hamburg senator Ronald Schill.

=== Comeback and founding of the record label ===
In 2004, the group founded their own record label, Fettes Brot Schallplatten (Fettes Brot Records).

In 2005, they represented Schleswig-Holstein in the Bundesvision Song Contest 2005, with the song "Emanuela" placing second with 130 points. A few days later on Valentine's Day, the single rose to third place on the singles charts. On 21 May 2005, their most successful album to date was released. The album was titled Am Wasser gebaut (literally "Built by the water", but is also a term describing a very emotional person who cries easily). This album was not as rap-oriented as previous ones and featured more soul influences.

The second single from Am Wasser gebaut was "An Tagen wie diesen" ("On days like these"), in collaboration with Pascal Finkenauer (German). The video, in which Finkenauer and DJ exel. Pauly (German) appear, depicts the activities of an ordinary day. It is ordinary, except that armoured tanks drive through the streets as if they were cars and the people take little notice of them.

On 6 October 2005, the three rappers won the Comet Award. They were the first band to win in two categories; they won both the category for "Best Band" and for "Best Song" ("Emanuela"). They were also nominated for "Best Video" and "Most Successful Download" ("Emanuela").

On 22 December 2005, Fettes Brot gave the largest concert of their career at the Color Line Arena in Hamburg in front of over 13,000 people. The concert was televised by MTV and numerous radio stations (e.g. Radio Fritz) broadcast it live.

=== D.O.C.H.! ===
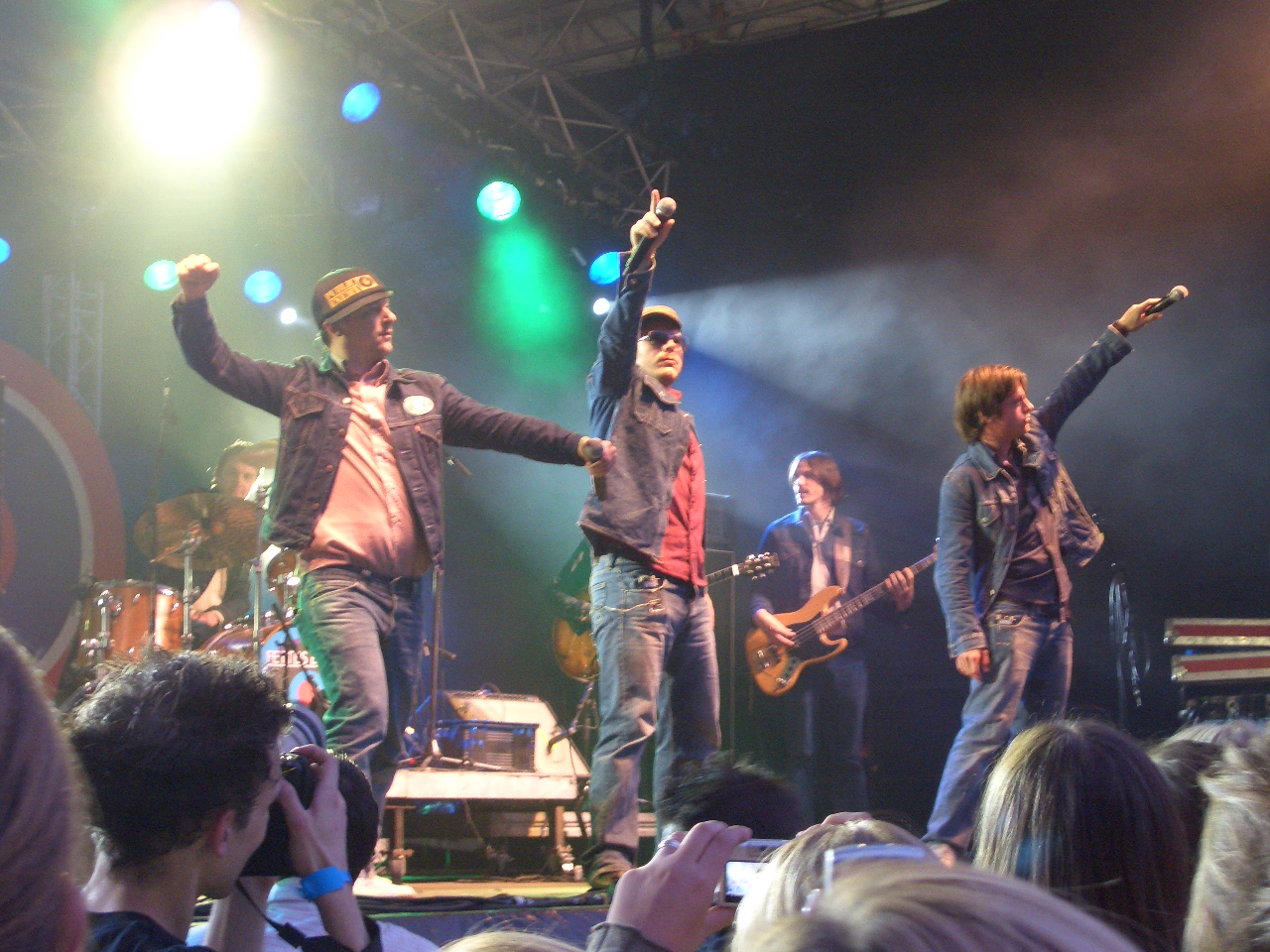
Fettes Brot in 2006

Fettes Brot has sometimes used the pseudonym D.O.C.H.! ("doch" which is a German word meaning "yet", "to the contrary", and "but", although most often it means an emphatic, "damn right!" or "yes!") to publish songs which would not be suitable for the hip hop genre. This began with an extensive PR gag. In January 2006, Fettes Brot announced that they had signed the power pop band D.O.C.H.! to their label. The band was to consist of three 17-year-olds from Berlin named Boy, Paolo, and Typ. News followed promising a first single, a Hungarian tour in April, and the release of an album in September. When the single "Was in der Zeitung steht" ("What's in the news") hit radio and television for the first time, a distinct similarity to the B-side of the "An Tagen wie diesen" single was noticed. (Doktor Renz had sung both songs.) After this, fans began to suspect the photos on the band's website were counterfeit. An announcement was made on MTV's TRL program on 9 May in which the three members of D.O.C.H.! accused Fettes Brot of having stolen their song.

=== Bette Frost and Strom und Drang ===
In 2006, Fettes Brot released a single named "Fussball ist immer noch wichtig" ("Football is still important") for the 2006 FIFA World Cup. They also released "Falsche Entscheidung" in 2006 for the World Cup, with a video featuring the retired footballers Boris Amadeus and Stefan Bach. Since both were huge fans of the band they appeared without receiving a fee. After extensive touring in 2005 and 2006, Fettes Brot began work on a new album in 2007. In December, they held several small secret concerts under the name Bette Frost and played the new songs.

On 1 January 2008, they unveiled the new single "Bettina, zieh dir bitte etwas an" ("Bettina, please put on some clothes!"), but the song was known as "Bettina, pack deine Brüste ein" ("Bettina, tuck your boobs away") because Fettes Brot had changed it at the last minute. The song is about the German model Bettie Ballhaus, who at the time hosted a late-night quiz show in which, for every question answered correctly, she took some of her clothes off. She also happened to show her breasts, hence the title of the song. However, before the single was released, Ballhaus had left the show. Fettes Brot released this single on 15 February 2008. They also have stopped making soul music and have gone back to the "old" Fettes Brot, making party songs and rap.

Fettes Brot released their new album Strom und Drang ("Electricity and Stress") in March 2008. The album's name alludes to an 18th-century epoch of German art and literature, called Sturm und Drang.

== Members ==
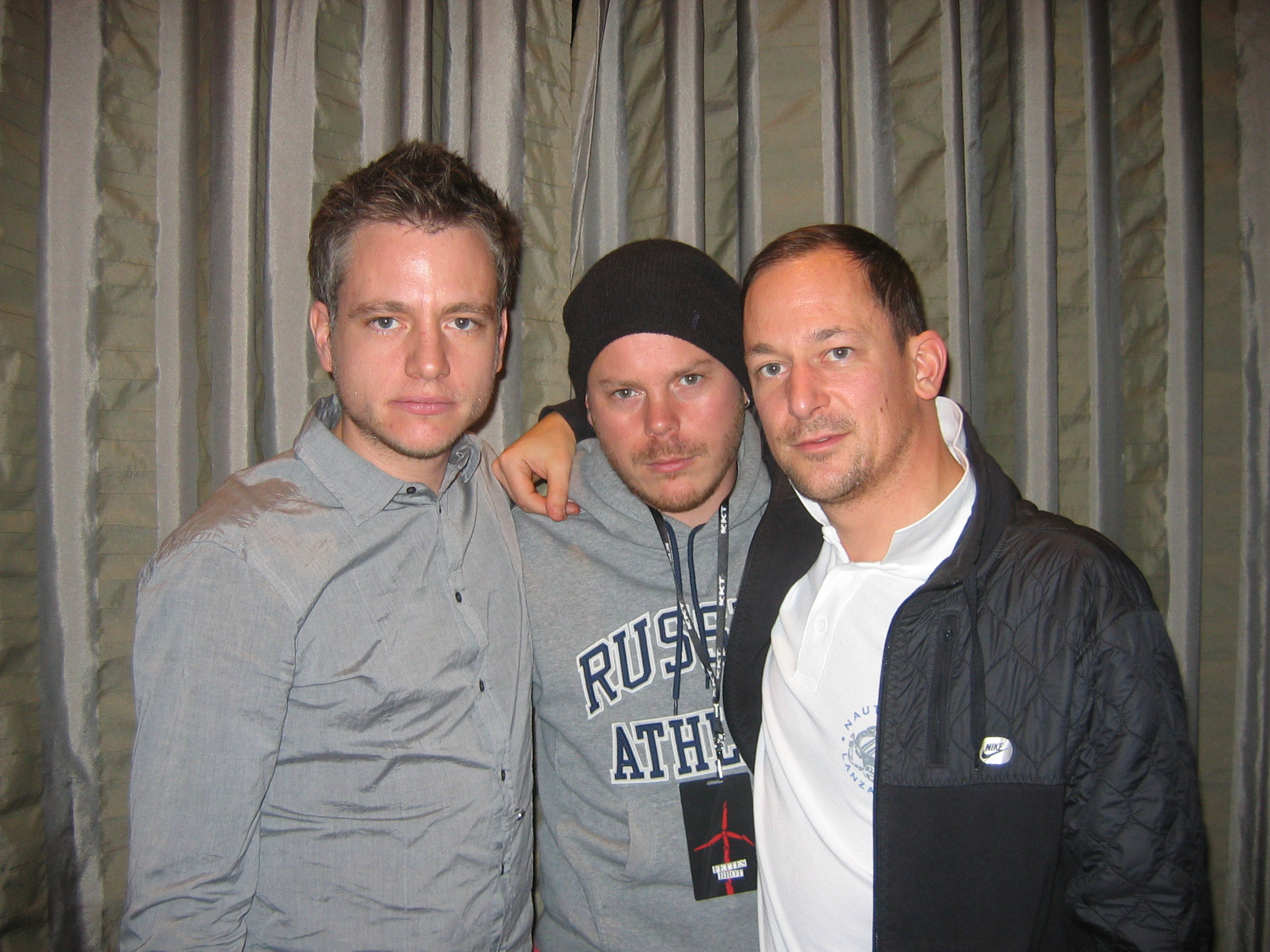
L-R: Dokter Renz, König Boris, Björn Beton (2008)

- Boris Lauterbach (a.k.a. König Boris, Kay Bee Baby, Rock'n'Roll Coseng, Long Leg Lauterbach)
- Martin Vandreier (a.k.a. Dokter Renz, Rektor Donz, Roktor Denz, Speedy Konsalik, Rostige Pforte, Hektor Ronz)
- Björn Warns (a.k.a. Björn Beton, Schiffmeister, Flash Müller, Papa Geil)

=== Trivia ===
Björn Warns took the name Schiffmeister from the classic video game Sid Meier's Pirates!. In that game, when his pirate ship suffered a mutiny, an announcement came up starting with the English words "Shipmaster Warns: ...". The German language does not have a direct equivalent for "Shipmaster" ("Kapitän" is used instead, as per the English "Captain"), but when Warns translated it he made up the word "Schiffmeister". Schiffmeister also means "piss master" in the northern German dialect.

Fettes Brot has made a cameo appearance in the German independent movie ABCs of Superheroes (2015)

== Discography ==
=== Studio albums ===
- 1995: Auf einem Auge blöd ("Stupid in one eye") GER#29, SWI#22
- 1996: Außen Top Hits, innen Geschmack ("Top Hits Outside, Taste Within" (pun on a commercial aired in Germany)) GER#10, AUT#21, SWI#14
- 1998: Fettes Brot lässt grüßen ("Fettes Brot Send Their Regards") GER#9, AUT#30, SWI#27
- 2001: Demotape GER#9, AUT#30, SWI#27
- 2005: Am Wasser gebaut ("Built on Water") GER#4, AUT#9, SWI#23
- 2008: Strom und Drang ("Electricity and Drive", a pun on Sturm und Drang) GER#3, AUT#9, SWI#14
- 2013: 3 is ne Party ("3 is a Party") GER#3, AUT#20, SWI#19
- 2015: Teenager vom Mars ("Teenagers from Mars") GER#7, AUT#29, SWI#27
- 2019: Lovestory GER#12

=== Other albums ===
- 2000: Fettes Brot für die Welt ("Fat Bread for the World") (Compiled with B-Sides, rare and unpublished pieces, and three new songs.) GER#10, AUT#32, SWI#55
- 2002: Amnesie (with the DVD, all singles up to 2002 except Gangsta Rap) GER#41
- 2007: Strandgut (Flotsam & Jetsam)

=== Live albums ===
- 2010: Fettes GER: No. 4
- 2010: Brot GER: No. 4
- 2017: Gebäck in the Days – Live in Hamburg 2016 GER: No. 62

=== Singles ===
- 1994: Definition von Fett ("The definition of phat")
- 1995: Männer ("Men")
- 1995: Nordisch by Nature ("Nordic by Nature") GER No. 17
- 1995: Gangsta Rap (only on vinyl)
- 1996: Jein (Portmanteau of "Yes" and "No") GER#10, SWI#7
- 1996: Mal sehen ("We'll see") GER#68, SWI#23
- 1997: Silberfische in meinem Bett ("Silverfish in my bed")
- 1997: Sekt oder Selters ("Sparkling wine or seltzer") GER#81
- 1997: Lieblingslied ("Favourite song") GER#81
- 1998: Viele Wege führen nach Rom ("Many roads lead to Rome") GER#96
- 1998: Können diese Augen lügen? ("Could these eyes lie?") GER#100
- 1999: Ruf mich an ("Call me") (with James Last) GER#53, SWI#39
- 2000: Da draußen ("Out there") GER#35, SWI#58
- 2001: Schwule Mädchen ("Gay girls") GER#9, AUS#11, SWI#74
- 2001: Fast 30 ("Almost 30") (with Skunk Funk)
- 2001: The Grosser ("The greatest") (Cover of The Joker by Steve Miller Band) GER#26, AUS#49, SWI#75
- 2002: Welthit ("Worldwide hit") GER#75
- 2003: Tanzverbot (Schill to Hell) ("Dance ban") (with Bela B.)
- 2003: Ich bin müde ("I'm tired") (Cover of Wolfgang Michels and Rio Reiser) GER#87
- 2005: Emanuela GER#3, AUS#1, SWI#20
- 2005: An Tagen wie diesen ("On days like these") (with Pascal Finkenauer) GER#9, AUS#10, SWI#69
- 2006: Soll das alles sein ("Is this supposed to be it?") GER#40, AUS#54
- 2006: Was in der Zeitung Steht ("What it says in the newspaper") (under the nickname "D.O.C.H")
- 2006: Fußball ist immer noch wichtig ("Football is still important") (with Bela B., Marcus Wiebusch of Kettcar and Carsten Friedrichs of Superpunk) GER#61
- 2008: Bettina, zieh dir bitte etwas an! ("Bettina, please put some clothes on!") GER#3, AUS#14, SWI#43
- 2008: Erdbeben ("Earthquake/s") GER#28, AUS#65
- 2008: Ich lass dich nicht los ("I won't let you go") GER#55
- 2008: Das allererste Mal ("The very first time")
- 2010: Jein (2010 live) (Portmanteau of "Yes" and "No") GER#36
- 2010: Kontrolle ("Control") (live) GER#90
- 2010: Falsche Entscheidung ("Bad decision") (live)
- 2010: Amsterdam GER#51
- 2013: Kuss Kuss Kuss ("Kiss Kiss Kiss") GER#35
- 2013: Echo GER#12
- 2014: Für immer immer ("Forever always") GER#36
- 2014: Fußballgott ("Football God")
- 2015: Teenager vom Mars ("Teenager from Mars")
- 2015: Von der Liebe ("About Love") GER#36
- 2019: Du driftest nach rechts ("You're drifting right")
- 2019: Ich liebe mich ("I love myself")
- 2019: Denxu?
- 2019: Deine Mama ("Your Mama Mor Din)")

=== EPs ===
- 1994: Mitschnacker (Northern German slang for "Kidnapper", but also "chatty person")

=== DVDs ===
- 2002: Amnesie (Archive DVD with music videos and other material, supplementary CD with all singles except Gangsta Rap.)

=== Compilations ===
- 1993 – Endzeit 93 ("Final hour 93") (two songs)

== Tours ==
- 1995: Klasse von '95 (Class of '95) – with Main Concept, Massive Töne, ZM Jay, MC Rene, F.A.B., Der Tobi & Das Bo
- 1996: Sven, Sven & Sven live – Inkognito-Club-Tour, November
- 1996/97: Spiel mir das Lied vom Brot – with Blumentopf, Massive Töne
- 1998: Harte Tour '98 (Hard Tour '98) – with Eins Zwo und DJ I.L.L. Will
- 2001: Schlechtwetterfront – with DJ exel. Pauly & Skunk Funk
- 2003: Gute Laune Hölle (only in theaters) – with Die Herren
- 2003: Jenseits der Grenze des Zumutbaren – support for Die Ärzte with Die Herren
- 2005: Am Wasser gebaut Part 1 – with Pascal Finkenauer, Emel & J-Luv, Opener: Fiva MC & DJ Radrum
- 2005: Am Wasser gebaut Part 2 – with Pascal Finkenauer, Emel & Patrick Gwada, no opener
- 2008: Strom und Drang Part 1 – with eight musicians

Opener: Superpunk, Die Türen, 1000 Robota, Johanna Zeul, Bernadette La Hengst

- 2008: Strom und Drang Part 2 – with eight musicians

Opener: Johanna Zeul, Vincent Van Go Go

- 2010: "Fettes/Brot Tour – with band

Opener: Die Orsons, Kraftklub, Jarle Bernhoft
