= Blumentopf =

German hip hop group

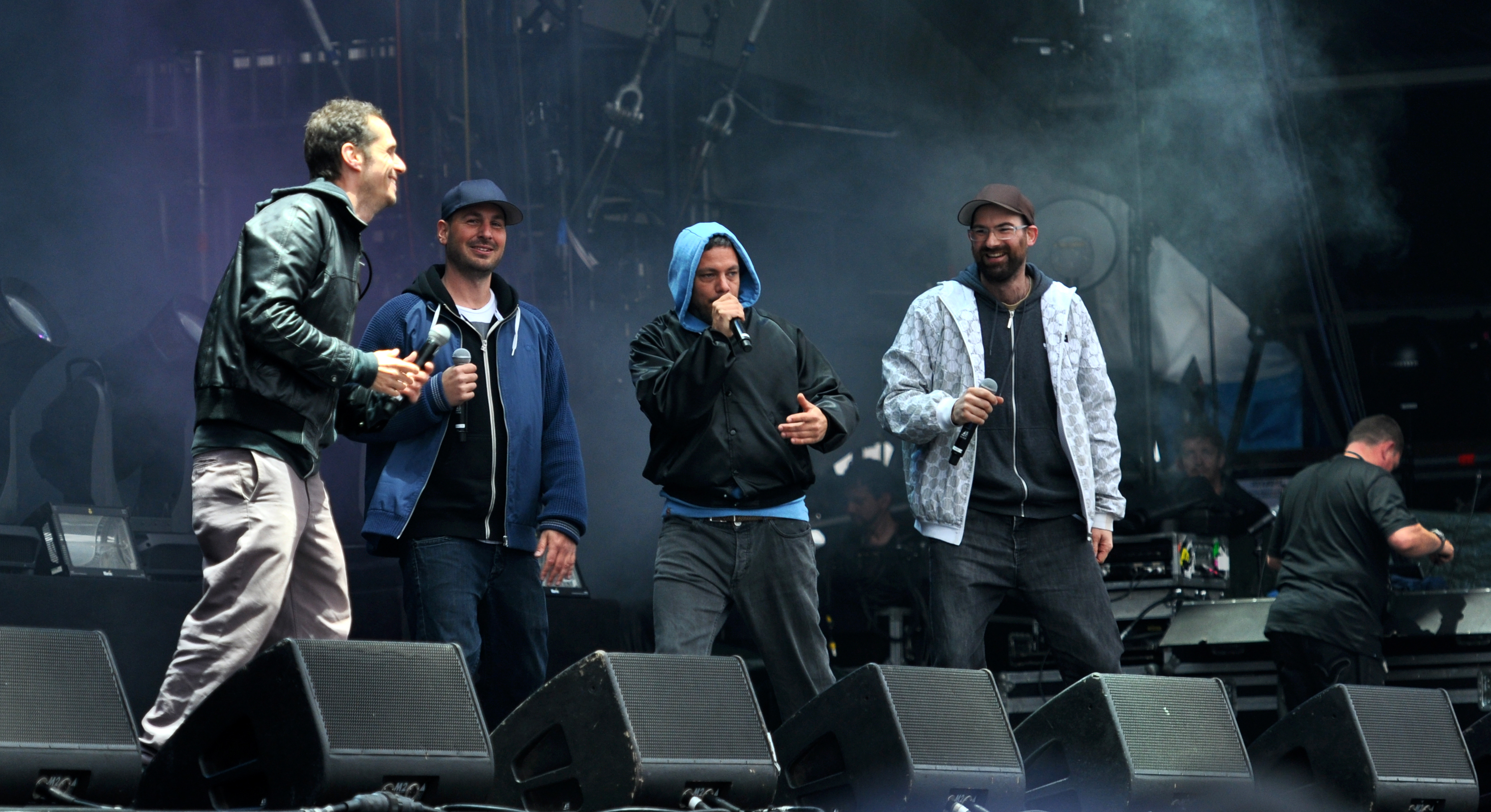
- Blumentopf at Rock am Ring 2013

Background information
- Origin: Munich, Germany
- Genres: Hip hop
- Years active: 1992–2016
- Labels: Four Music, EMI
- Past members: Cajus Heinzmann (Heinemann); Bernhard Wunderlich (Holunder); Florian Schuster (Schu); Roger Manglus (Roger); Sebastian Weiss (Sepalot)
- Website: blumentopf.com

Blumentopf ("Flower pot") was a German hip hop group from Freising near Munich.

In the early days of the band, the members met irregularly and did not have ambitions to become professional musicians. Each week a new name was chosen. The band was invited to perform at a festival for their first live show. The name at the time was Blumentopf and once it appeared on promotional posters for the festival, it stuck.

They released their first album in 1997 on Four Music. They have released five more albums as a group, along with songs released on compilations, and various side projects. Until their dissolution in 2016, they were signed to record label EMI.

The band consisted of five members: rappers, Cajus Heinzmann (Cajus, Heinemann, Master P), Bernhard Wunderlich (Holunder, Holundermann, Wunder), Florian Schuster (Flo, Kung Schu, Schu), Roger Manglus (Roger, Specht) and Sebastian Weiss (DJ Sepalot).

In October 2015, they announced that they would dissolve the group and played their last concert in Munich on 22 October 2016, thanking all fans for their continuous support throughout the band's 24-year history.

== Music ==
Blumentopf was known for using a Storytelling style. They used humor, irony, and a lot of wordplay to tell stories about everyday life, relationship, parties, both true and fictitious.

Other songs can be placed in the conscious hip hop genre, commenting on current issues. The song Danke Bush! ("Thank you, Bush") presents a critical view of the politics of George W. Bush. Several songs also suggest that drugs and hip hop are not directly connected. One such song is Nur dass ihr wisst ("Just so you know"). In the lead-up to the 2009 German federal election, the group appeared in a Wahlwerbespot ("election advertisement") in which they encouraged Germans to vote. They expressed the importance of learning about the candidates and using their right to vote, emphasizing how little effort it really would take.

Blumentopf's first three albums have a very old school hip hop feel. The fourth album Gern geschehen saw the use of powerful synth beats and unusual musical ideas as seen in Jeder zweite linkt dich, which uses samples from the song Santa Baby for the entire beat. This was continued in the fifth album Musikmaschine ("Music machine"), which has a song using skateboard noises for the majority of the beat. The band members themselves have learned instruments so they can play their songs. They hoped to develop these opportunities further.

=== Raportage ===
The term 'raportage' comes from the music style, rap, and the German word Reportage ("report"). This concept is consistent with Blumentopf's Storytelling style.

For the 2006 FIFA World Cup, Blumentopf worked with the German television channel Das Erste in producing game commentary set to music. The Raportagen were broadcast with video clips of the band, game and press conference footage, and other related video during Das Erste football coverage. This concept was continued during UEFA Euro 2008, the 2010 FIFA World Cup, the UEFA Euro 2012 and finally at the 2014 FIFA World Cup, where Germany won the tournament, fulfilling Blumentopf's self-imposed mission in 2006 of continuing the commentaries until Germany became either world or European champion.

=== Side projects ===
DJ Sepalot released a solo project entitled Red Handed in 2007. Roger and Cajus released their solo albums Alles Roger ("Everything roger/ok") and Planet Cajun. Since the beginning of May 2008, Blumentopf broadcasts a radio show with on3radio.

== Awards ==
Blumentopf was voted Best Live Band by readers of the German hip hop magazine Juice in both 2001 and 2002.

Blumentopf represented Bavaria in the Bundesvision Song Contest 2010, coming in fourth place.

== Goethe Institute Middle East Tour ==
The band was invited to participate in the 2005 Goethe Institute Nah-Ost Tour during the month of November. The band performed in Tel Aviv, Bethlehem, Beirut, and Amman. For the tour, the group collaborated with local artists from Egypt, Jordan, Israel, Syria, and Lebanon.

== Discography ==
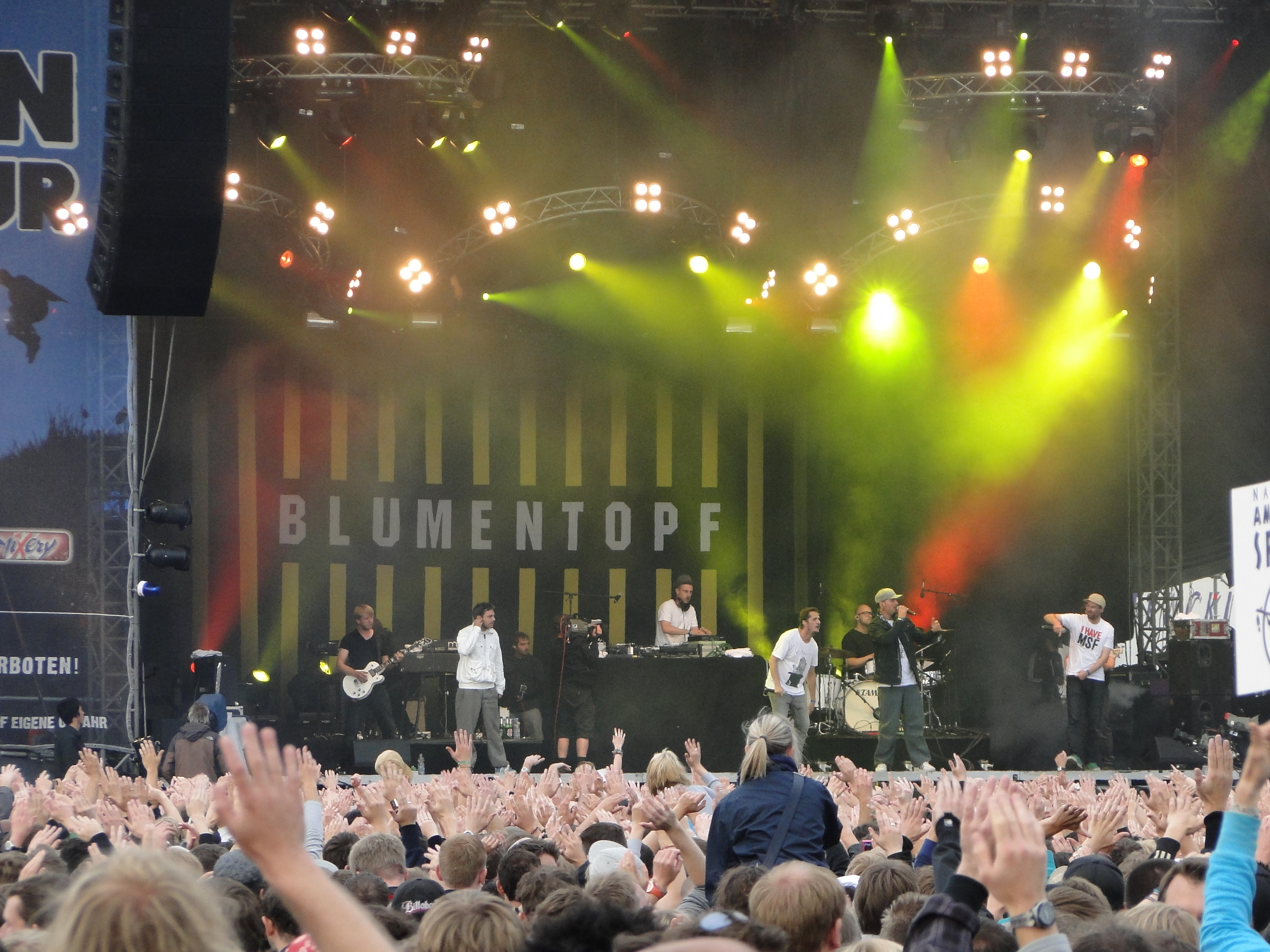
Blumentopf performing at Rheinkultur 2011

Albums

- 1995 Demo-CD with Ich bin sexy, An meine Homies etc.
- 1997 Kein Zufall (Debut-LP)
- 1999 Großes Kino
- 2001 Eins A
- 2003 Gern geschehen
- 2006 Musikmaschine
- 2010 WIR
- 2012 Nieder mit der gbr
- 2013 B-Seiten und Raritäten

Singles

- 1996 Abhängen
- 1997 6 Meter 90
- 1997 Man kann nicht alles haben
- 1999 Fensterplatz
- 1999 Was der Handel
- 2000 Safari
- 2001 Liebe und Hass (Love and Hate)
- 2001 R'n'B
- 2002 Flirtaholics
- 2003 Better Life GmbH feat. Smudo
- 2004 Macht Platz
- 2004 Alt feat. Texta
- 2006 Horst
- 2006 Du und ich (You and I)
- 2007 Die City schläft (The city is sleeping)
- 2010 WIR
- 2010 Solala

DVD

- 2004: Gern Gesehen – The DVD contains Tour reports, interviews, freestyles and Live records of the Gern Geschehen-Tour.

Collaborations

- 1996: Wildwechsel with Fettes Brot
- 1998: Alpenpanorama & Zukunftsmusik with Total Chaos
- 2000: 2:2
- 2000: Session drei & Session vier with Main Concept
- 2000: Süßlicher Weihrauch with Brotlose Kunst
- 2001: 3 mal täglich with Droopy the Hitmachine
- 2002: Bermuda Dreieck with Total Chaos
- 2002: Die unendliche Geschichte (The neverending story)
- 2002: Kaleidoskop
- 2002: Liebe und Hass Teil II with I.L.L. Will
- 2002: Niemand with Roey Marquis II.
- 2002: Viel Spaß with FlowinImmO & Esther
- 2003: Kaliweed with Les Babacools
- 2003: Saftig & Sei da
- 2004: Egal wo! with Clueso
- 2004: Alt with Texta
- 2005: Ich wär so gern… with Nico Suave
- 2005: Adam und Ivo with Main Concept
- 2005: Weißt du wer? with Toni L and Black Tiger
- 2006: Wer spielt mit uns? with Vier zu Eins
- 2007: Benghanny Rap with Y Crew (Egypt)

Other collaborations

- 2006: Kann man nich lern (Clueso feat. Blumentopf – Juice Exclusive [CD #63])
- 2006: Ja Klar! (Juice Exclusive CD #68)
- 2006: Gute Musik (Juice Exclusive CD #66 [Juice Edit])
- 2006: WM-Raportagen (Das Erste)
- 2008: EM-Raportagen (Das Erste)
- 2010: WM-Raportagen (Das Erste)
