= Sie hat was vermisst =

Single by Bela B.

from the album Bingo
- Released: 3 November 2006
- Genre: Rock
- Length: 3:49
- Label: BPX 1992
- Songwriter(s): Dirk Felsenheimer
- Producer(s): Olsen Involtini, Wayne Jackson & Bela B.

Bela B. singles chronology
"Fussball ist immer noch wichtig" (2006)	"Sie hat was vermisst" (2006)	"Der Graf vs. Horrorpunks" (2007)

"Sie hat was vermisst" [She missed something] is a song by Bela B. It is the third single and the ninth track from his debut album Bingo. It is a comforting song for a man, whose partner has left him.

== Video ==
Bela casts as "Bingo King", a bingo-fan. He goes to a bingo game, which, according to the video, is clearly for elderly people. His van has a blown tire and instead, he takes a mobility scooter. He has no luck until a guitar is put out as the prize and the number 66 is shown. He yells "bingo" and the video switches to a dream, where Bela performs "Loverboy" (the b-side of "Tag mit Schutzumschlag") with the guitar. However, "66" was a mistake and the number was actually 99 (although there is no distinction on the ball to show whether it is 66 or 99) and Bela's dreams are crushed. In the end, as he's already driven away from the bingo hall, he appears to steal the guitar.

== Track listing ==
=== Premium ===
1. Bela B.: Sie hat was vermisst (anderer Mix) (Felsenheimer) - 03:49
2. Bela B. feat. Roy Paci & Aretuska: Sie hat den Mambo vermisst (She missed the mambo) (M: Roy Paci & Aretuska/T: Felsenheimer) - 02:47
3. We Are Scientists: (Spiel mir das Lied vom) Sie hat was vermisst ((Play me the song of) She missed something) (Felsenheimer) - 05:49
4. Bela B.: Z (live im Behelfs-Lunik beim Soundcheck in der AMO-Halle in Magdeburg) (M: Stülpner, Quidde, Jackson/T: Felsenheimer) - 03:58
5. Bela B.: Sie hat was vermisst (das Video) - 03:49

=== 2-track ===
1. Bela B.: Sie hat was vermisst (anderer Mix) (Felsenheimer) - 03:49
2. Bela B.: Z (live im Behelfs-Lunik beim Soundcheck in der AMO-Halle in Magdeburg) (M: Stülpner, Quidde, Jackson/T: Felsenheimer) - 03:58

=== Vinyl ===
1. Bela B.: Sie hat was vermisst (anderer Mix) (Felsenheimer) - 03:49
2. Bela B. feat. Roy Paci & Aretuska: Sie hat den Mambo vermisst (She missed the mambo) (M: Roy Paci & Aretuska/T: Felsenheimer) - 02:47
3. Bela B.: Z (live im Behelfs-Lunik beim Soundcheck in der AMO-Halle in Magdeburg) (M: Stülpner, Quidde, Jackson/T: Felsenheimer) - 03:58
