= Big Muff (album) =

Studio album by The Killer Barbies
- Released: 1998
- Genre: Punk rock
- Length: 39:07
- Label: Toxic Records

The Killer Barbies chronology
...Only for Freaks! (1996)	Big Muff (1998)	Fucking Cool (1999)

Big Muff is an album by The Killer Barbies. It was released in 1998 on Toxic Records.

== Track listing ==
1. "Lost Control" (4:10)
2. "Baby Two Heads" (3:18)
3. "Crazy" (4:54)
4. "Rage" (3:18)
5. "Joyride" (2:40)
6. "Set on Fire" (3:21)
7. "Crime" (3:11)
8. "Hurt Me" (2:49)
9. "Going Down" (3:33)
10. "You" (2:35)
11. "My Brain" (2:32)
12. "The Family is Chainsaw" (2:50)
