= Tanzverbot (Schill to Hell) =

Single by Fettes Brot & Bela B.
- Released: 2003
- Genre: Hip-hop
- Label: Der Branche geht's total mies Downloads & Records
- Songwriter(s): Fettes Brot, Bela B.
- Producer(s): Fettes Brot & Bela B.

Fettes Brot singles chronology
"Welthit" (2002)	"Tanzverbot (Schill to Hell)" (2003)	"Ich bin müde" (2003)

Bela B. singles chronology
"Candy" (2002)	"Tanzverbot (Schill to Hell)" (2003)	"Tag mit Schutzumschlag" (2006)

"Tanzverbot (Schill to Hell)" (dancing ban) is a song by the German hip-hop group Fettes Brot and rock musician Bela B. It was written to protest against the then-Hamburg Senator of the Interior Ronald Schill. The whole revenue for the sales of this single went to organisations, unions and facilities that suffered under the measures by the Senate of Hamburg.

In the middle of the song, Chris Isaak's "Wicked Game" is covered.

Fettes Brot and Bela B. later collaborated on "Fussball ist immer noch wichtig".

== Track listing ==
1. "Tanzverbot (Schill to Hell)"
2. "Tanzverbot (Schill to Hell)" instrumental
