= Code B =

Studio album by Bela B
- Released: 2 October 2009
- Recorded: 2008
- Genre: Rock
- Length: 47:39
- Label: Columbia

Bela B chronology
Bingo (2006)	Code B (2009)	Bye (2014)

Singles from Code B
- 1. "Altes Arschloch Liebe" Released: 2009; 2. "Schwarz/Weiss" Released: 2009; 3. "Liebe und Benzin" Released: 2010

Code B is the second solo studio album by German musician Bela B. It was released on 2 October 2009.

== Track listing ==
All tracks are written by Bela B.

No.	Title	Featuring	Length
1.	"Rockula"		3:05
2.	"Geburtstagsleid" (Birthday misery, pun on 'Geburtstagslied', meaning 'birthday song')		3:40
3.	"In diesem Leben nicht" (Not in this life)	Chris Spedding	3:28
4.	"Altes Arschloch Liebe" (Old asshole love)		4:27
5.	"Schwarz/Weiss" (Black/white)	Marcel Eger	3:13
6.	"Onenightstand"		3:33
7.	"Ninjababypowpow"	Chris Spedding	4:03
8.	"Hilf dir selbst" (Help yourself)		3:07
9.	"Bobotanz" (Bobo dance)		4:27
10.	"Liebe und Benzin" (Love and fuel)	Emmanuelle Seigner	3:48
11.	"Als wir unsterblich waren" (When we were immortal)		3:00
12.	"Nein!" (No!)		3:17
13.	"Dein Schlaflied" (Your lullaby)		4:08
14.	"Der Wahrheit" (The truth)	Alessandro Alessandroni	3:28

Professional ratings
Review scores
Source	Rating
laut.de	4/5 stars
plattentests.de	4/10 stars
Visions	8/12 stars
Musikexpress	2.5/6 stars

"Der Wahrheit" is the 14th and final track on the album. The song is known by three names:

- On the album cover: "Der Wahrheit" (The truth; possibly genitive: Of the truth). The song title comes from the line Ich will euch von der Wahrheit erzählen (I want to tell you about the truth).
- The announcement on Bela B's website: "The Wahrheit" (The truth)
- The German normal feminine article for Wahrheit (truth): "Die Wahrheit" (The truth)

There is a hidden track before Rockula that can be heard by rewinding to -1:00. This track is a recording of Lee Hazlewood speaking about his collaboration with Bela B on Das erste Lied des Tages from the album Bingo.

== Singles ==
- 2009: "Altes Arschloch Liebe"
- 2009: "Schwarz/Weiss"
- 2010: "Liebe und Benzin"
- 2010: "In diesem Leben" (feat. Chris Spedding)

== Personnel ==
- Bela B – vocals, drums, guitars, samples

Los Helmstedt:

- Olsen Involtini – guitars, keyboards, samples, backup vocals
- Wayne Jackson – guitars, glockenspiel, ukulele, pedal steel, samples, backup vocals
- Holly Burnette – bass, double bass
- Lula – backup vocals
- Paule – backup vocals
- Danny Young – narration ("Bobotanz")

Guests:

- Chris Spedding – guitar ("In diesem Leben nicht", "Ninjababypowpow")
- Marcel Eger – additional vocals ("Schwarz/Weiß")
- Emmanuelle Seigner – additional vocals ("Liebe und Benzin")
- Alessandro Alessandroni – additional vocals, various instruments ("Der Wahrheit")
- Sisters Ramadani – chor voices ("Liebe und Benzin")
- Christian Ketchmer – cello ("Dein Schlaflied")
- Jerome Bugon – horns ("Liebe und Benzin")
- Sascha Moser – edits
- Lars Meier – violin

== Sources ==
- Official homepage/music (archived)
