= Candy (Iggy Pop song) =

1990 single by Iggy Pop

Single by Iggy Pop featuring Kate Pierson

from the album Brick by Brick
- B-side: "Neon Forest"
- Released: September 10, 1990
- Length: 4:13 (LP version); 4:02 (single edit)
- Label: Virgin
- Songwriter: Iggy Pop
- Producer: Don Was

Iggy Pop singles chronology
"Home" (1990)	"Candy" (1990)	"Butt Town" (1991)

Music video
- "Candy" on YouTube

"Candy" is a song from American singer and songwriter Iggy Pop's ninth solo album, Brick by Brick (1990). A duet with Kate Pierson of the B-52's, it was the album's second single in September 1990. It became the biggest mainstream hit of Pop's career, as he reached the top 40 in the United States for the first and only time, peaking at numbers 28 and 35 on the Billboard Hot 100 and Cash Box Top 100 charts. The song additionally peaked within the top 10 in Australia, Belgium and the Netherlands. "I've written one good pop song: 'Candy'," he noted. "It's a very decent, proper pop song, but that's as far as that went."

The cover was drawn by American cartoonist Charles Burns. "Candy" reappeared on the 1996 compilation Nude & Rude: The Best of Iggy Pop and the 2005 two-disc collection A Million in Prizes: The Anthology.

== Background ==
The initial narrator is a man (Pop) who grieves a lost love. Following the first chorus, the perspective of the woman (Pierson) is heard. She expresses, unbeknownst to the man, that she misses him too. According to Pop, the lyrics refer to a teenage girlfriend, Betsy:

I was looking back on my relationship with her, and I thought 'Let's be fair. Let the girl have her say.' I wanted a girl who would sing with a small-town voice, and Kate has a little twang in her voice that sounds slightly rural and naive.

The song was offered first to Chrissie Hynde. She said, "we didn't pull that off. And I always regretted that, because Iggy was always my number one when I was growing up. And then he wrote this song and he sent it to me. It was handwritten and everything. I don't know what I did to turn him off the idea, but then I never heard from him. And he ended up doing the song with Kate Pierson."

== Reception ==
"Candy"
Sample of "Candy", a song by Iggy Pop with Kate Pierson, taken from Pop's 1990 album Brick by Brick.

In the United States, "Candy" debuted on November 24, 1990, at number 90 on the Billboard Hot 100. It peaked at number 28 in February 1991 and is Pop's only single to appear on the chart. The song was a top-five modern rock hit, remaining on the Modern Rock Tracks chart for 17 weeks. It also reached the top 30 of the Album Rock Tracks chart. Elsewhere, the single reached the top 10 in Belgium, the Netherlands and Australia, peaking at numbers 10, four, and nine, respectively. "Candy" also charted well in New Zealand, reaching number 39, and is Pop's only other song to chart there besides the number-one hit "Real Wild Child (Wild One)". However, it was not as commercially successful in the United Kingdom, peaking at number 67.

In 2008, the song was ranked number seven on Spinner.com's list of the 10 best duets ever, and number 14 in Retrocrush's list of the 25 greatest duets of all time.

== Track listings ==
Cassette single (US)

1. "Candy"
2. "Neon Forest"

12-inch vinyl and CD maxi (Europe)

1. "Candy" – 4:13
2. "The Undefeated" (acoustic demo version) – 2:38
3. "Butt Town" (acoustic demo version) – 2:32

10-inch vinyl limited edition (UK)

1. "Candy"
2. "Pussy Power" (acoustic demo version)
3. "My Baby Wants to Rock n' Roll" (acoustic demo version)

7-inch vinyl (Germany, France)

1. "Candy" – 4:13
2. "Pussy Power" (acoustic demo version) – 2:38

== Charts ==
=== Weekly charts ===
Chart (1990)	Peak position
Australia (ARIA)	9
Belgium (Ultratop 50 Flanders)	10
Europe (Eurochart Hot 100)	79
Netherlands (Dutch Top 40)	4
Netherlands (Single Top 100)	7
New Zealand (Recorded Music NZ)	39
UK Singles (Official Charts)	67
US Billboard Hot 100	28
US Alternative Airplay (Billboard)	5
US Mainstream Rock Airplay (Billboard)	30
US Cash Box Top 100	35

=== Year-end charts ===
Chart (1990)	Position
Belgium (Ultratop)	96
Netherlands (Dutch Top 40)	40
Netherlands (Single Top 100)	41

== Certifications ==
Region	Certification	Certified units/sales
Australia (ARIA)	Gold	35,000^{^}
^{^} Shipments figures based on certification alone.

== Release history ==
Region	Date	Format(s)	Label(s)	Ref.
Australia	September 10, 1990	7-inch vinyl; cassette	Virgin	
United Kingdom	September 17, 1990	7-inch vinyl; 10-inch vinyl; 12-inch vinyl	Virgin America	
Japan	October 21, 1990	Mini-CD	Virgin	
Australia	March 11, 1991	CD	Virgin	

== Cover versions ==
=== Killer Barbies version ===
"Candy"

Single by Killer Barbies featuring Bela B.

from the album Sin Is In
- Released: September 30, 2002
- Genre: Rock and roll, punk rock
- Label: Drakkar
- Songwriter: Iggy Pop
- Producer: Uwe Hoffmann

The Killer Barbies singles chronology
"Gente Pez" (2001)	"Candy" (2002)

Bela B. singles chronology
"You'll Never Walk Alone" (2002)	"Candy" (2002)	"Tanzverbot (Schill to Hell)" (2003)

Music video
- "Candy" on YouTube

"Candy" was recorded and released as a single by the Spanish punk band Killer Barbies and German rock musician Bela B. in 2002 on Drakkar Records.

The maxi-CD contains a comic book illustrated by German graphic artist Schwarwel, titled Tales of the Killer Barbies, in which Bela appears as Count Bela ("der Graf", or in English "the Count", a nickname for Bela B.).

The band's album Sin Is In does not include the single version of the song; however, it does contain a John Fryer remix as well as the music video for "Candy."

==== Video ====
Silvia finds a comic book from a stand, where Bela as Count Bela sings to her. She gets hooked on it and sits down to read it. However, her bandmates follow her and she has to flee to read the comic book in peace. Later, Count Bela sings in the studio with her. Silvia is also seen as a comic book character.

==== Track listings ====
1. "Candy" feat. Bela B. (Iggy Pop) — 3:59
2. "Candy" (Spanish version) (Iggy Pop) — 3:57

Comic book version

1. "Candy" feat. Bela B. (Iggy Pop) — 3:59
2. "Fui yo" (non-album track) (S. Garcia/A. Dominguez) — 3:29
3. "Going Wild" (non-album track) (S. Garcia/A. Dominguez) — 3:11
4. "Candy" (Spanish version) feat. Bela B. (Iggy Pop) — 3:57

=== Other versions ===
- Heavy metal artist the Impaler (the lead singer of the S&M band, N2 submission), with singer Cindi St. Germain, recorded a spoken word version of the song for the 1998 tribute album, Pop O.D.: The Songs of Iggy Pop.
- Polish rock band Hey recorded a live version of the song for their album MTV Unplugged. It was performed by the band's female singer Kasia Nosowska and Jacek "Budyń" Szymkiewicz from the band Pogodno on male vocals.
- Czech punk band Tři sestry made a cover titled "Venda" with their own Czech lyrics. This song is part of the 1999 album Soubor kreténů.
- Spanish rock singer Loquillo has also recorded a cover of "Candy" titled "Candy baby". It is included in Loquillo's compilation album Rock n' roll star: 30 años and Kate Pierson's part was sung by Aurora Beltrán, the Tahúres Zurdos' vocalist.
- Brazilian rock singer Wander Wildner has also recorded a cover of "Candy" on the 2004 album Paraquedas do Coração.
