= ...Only for Freaks! =

Studio album by The Killer Barbies
- Released: 1996
- Genre: Punk rock
- Length: 31:44
- Labels: Toxic, Subterfuge

The Killer Barbies chronology
Dressed to Kiss (1995)	...Only for Freaks! (1996)	Big Muff (1998)

...Only for Freaks! is the second album by the Spanish punk band The Killer Barbies. It was released in 1996 by Toxic Records/Subterfuge Records and was produced by Billy D. and Javier Abreu.

== Track listing ==
1. "Freak Show" (4.18)
2. "Chainsaw Times" (2.25)
3. "Chinatown" (2.34)
4. "The Phone" (3.40)
5. "Traci Lords" (1.30)
6. "Pinball" (1.59)
7. "Train from Kansas City" (3.33)
8. "No Waves! (2.18)
9. "Friday 13th" (2.35)
10. "Be Your Girl" (4.07)
11. "They Come From Mars" (2.18)
12. "I Don't Mind" (1.43)
13. "Bad Trip Experience?" (1.19)
