= Nico Suave =

German rapper

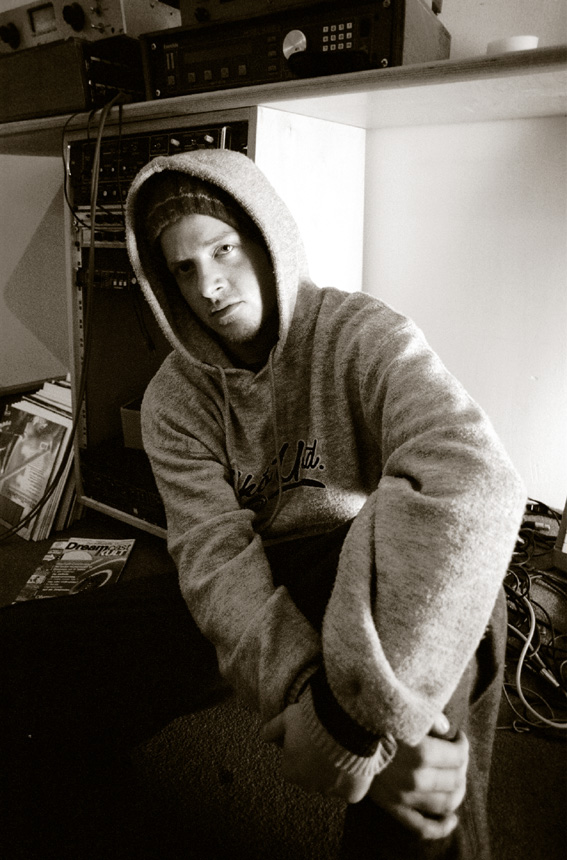
Nico Suave

Nico Suave is a German rapper originating from Menden, Sauerland. Interested in hip hop since young age, at 16 started writing music and formed the group Provinzaroma with Dabru Tack and Kraans de Lutin performing in local youth centers. In 1998 he was included in the Eins Zwo album Gefährliches Halbwissen in the track "Sternzeichen Krebs" gaining him notoriety. He was also part of Dendemann German tour alongside DJ Rabauke. Reestablishing in Hamburg, he released his own maxi CD Münchhausen '94 produced by Ill Will and guest appearances by Deichkind and DJ Friction. Signed to Universal Music Group, he followed this up with his studio album Suave in April 2001 with "Vergesslich" becoming his first charting single from the album. With increasing problems of UMG, he later joined Berlin-based label No Limits, releasing the album Mit Liebe gemacht in 2005.

In 2007, he released the album Suave & Friends produced by "The Gunna", a young producer from Dortmund, and collaborations with z.B. Denyo, Blumentopf, Harris, Franky Kubrick. The music video "Kool" was prominently played on TV stations. In 2009, with Goethe-Institut, he organized a number of workshops in Australia and New Zealand.

In 2015 he had a comeback with his album Unvergesslich with "Danke" featuring German Soul and R&B singer/songwriter and record producer Xavier Naidoo. He also founded the Nico Suave and the Bodacious Supreme, a composite ensemble with members of Grudlefunk, the Family Night Band, Mai Maiz, Tar iguana, and others in 2016.

In 2017 he played 1M Europe-Germany Live Selections.

== Discography ==
=== Albums ===
Year	Album	Record label	Peak positions	
Year	Album	Record label	GER	SUI
2001	Suave	Universal Music Group	49	–
2005	Mit Liebe gemacht	No Limits	–	–
2007	Suave and Friends	Bock auf'n Beat Music	–	–
2015	Unvergesslich	Embassy of Music	40	95
2022	Gute Neuigkeiten	Embassy of Music	75	–

=== Singles ===
Year	Single	Record label	Peak positions		Album
Year	Single	Record label	GER	SUI	Album
2001	"Vergesslich"	Universal Music Group	87	–	Suave
2001	" Ich sage Ja!"	Universal Music Group	–	–	Suave
2005	"Love Song"	No Limits	–	–	Mit Liebe gemacht
2007	"Kool" (feat. TheOne and Blumentopf)	Bock auf´n Beat Music	–	–	Suave and Friends
2014	"Gedicht" (feat. Flo Mega)	Embassy of Music	78	–	Unvergesslich
2015	"Danke" (feat. Xavier Naidoo)	Embassy of Music	20	70	Unvergesslich
