= Wir brauchen... Werner =

Single by Bela B. & Jan

from the album Werner - Beinhart!
- Released: 1990
- Genre: Rock
- Length: 5:55/3:47
- Label: Polydor
- Songwriter: Felsenheimer/Vetter
- Producer: Uwe Hoffmann

Bela B. singles chronology
"Pogo Dancing" (1989)	"Wir brauchen... Werner" (1990)	"This Girl Was Made for Loving" (1997)

Farin Urlaub singles chronology
"Wir brauchen... Werner" (1990)	"Liebe macht blind" (2000)

"Wir brauchen... Werner" (We need... Werner) is a song recorded for the film "Werner – Beinhart!", which is the first film made about the German comics hero Werner. Die Ärzte was supposed to record it and the song was supposed to be the theme song for the film, however, Die Ärzte was on hiatus in the time and the song was instead recorded by Die Ärzte's members Bela B. and Farin Urlaub a.k.a. Jan; the song became the end credits song and didn't do well on charts. The song was released alongside the film's premiere on 29 November 1990. Despite the song's modest chart performance, the film itself became one of the most successful German productions of the year, attracting 4,907,624 viewers and finishing third at the German domestic box office for 1990. Die Ärzte had been on hiatus since 1988, following the departure of bassist Sahnie, and would not reform until 1993; "Wir brauchen... Werner" marked one of the few collaborative releases by Bela B. and Farin Urlaub during this period.

The longer version is also on the soundtrack; the shorter version is only on the single, it's also more lively. Also, "Hau wech" was on the soundtrack.

== Track listing ==
=== 7" single ===
1. Bela B. & Jan: "Wir brauchen... Werner" (Felsenheimer/Vetter) – 3:47
2. The F....' Kius Band: "Hau wech" (Peter Thomsen) – 3:16

=== Maxi ===
1. Bela B. & Jan: "Wir brauchen... Werner" (Felsenheimer/Vetter) – 5:55
2. The F....' Kius Band: "Hau wech" (Peter Thomsen) – 3:16
3. Bela B. & Jan: "Wir brauchen... Werner" (Felsenheimer/Vetter) – 3:47

== Personnel ==
- Bela B. - vocals (verses), lead guitar, drums
- Farin Urlaub - vocals (chorus), rhythm guitar, bass
