= Bad taste =

Bad taste may refer to:

- An idea that does not fall within normal social standards; see the section on Bad taste in sociology
- Kitsch art
- An unpleasant flavor
- Bad Taste, the 1987 New Zealand cult film by Peter Jackson
- Bad Taste (record label), an Icelandic record label
- Bad Taste Records, a Swedish record label
- Bad Taste (album), a 2000 album by the Killer Barbies

== See also ==
- Bad taste in one's mouth (wiktionary)
