= This Girl Was Made for Loving =

Single by Heike & Dirk

from the album Obsession
- Released: 1 August 1997
- Genre: Pop/Rock
- Length: 3:06
- Label: Columbia
- Songwriter(s): Micki Meuser; Bela Felsenheimer; Cabs
- Producer(s): Micki Meuser

Bela B. singles chronology
"Wir brauchen... Werner" (1990)	"This Girl Was Made for Loving" (1997)	"Leave" (2000)

"This Girl Was Made for Loving" is a single released for the soundtrack of the 1997 film Obsession, sung by German actress Heike Makatsch and German singer Bela B.

== Track listing ==
1. Heike & Dirk: This Girl Was Made for Loving - 3:06
2. Heike & Dirk: This Girl Was Made for Loving (Some Evil Falcons Mix) - 4:06
3. Déjeuner sur l'herbe - 2:43
4. Niagara (Final Theme) - 2:36
