= Eins Zwo =

German hip hop group

- Origin: Hamburg, Germany
- Genres: German hip hop
- Years active: 1997–2003
- Label: Yo Mama
- Past members: Dendemann; DJ Rabauke
- Website: www.einszwo.de

Eins Zwo ("One Two") was a German hip hop group from Hamburg, consisting of DJ Rabauke (Thomas Jensen) and MC Dendemann (Daniel Ebel). Rabauke produced his first music with his 'Projekt an der Grenze'. He however, was before Eins Zwo more known for his work as tour DJ with the group Fettes Brot. Dendemann was formerly mostly associated with his work as a member of the 'Vorgruppe Arme Ritter'.

Eins Zwo started out in 1997. Running into each other during a soundcheck that year they decided to make music together and create the demo "S.P.O.R.T". Later that year they accompanied the group 5 Sterne Deluxe as support act on a short tour through Germany and enlarged on their "S.P.O.R.T." demotape. The tape was then released nationwide as an EP halfway through 1998 in its unaltered, unmastered form and quickly became highly sought after in the scene. It was reputedly the most illegally copied album in the German hip hop scene that year.

In May 1999, their first longplay album was released: Gefährliches Halbwissen. The word-wizardry of Dendemann became through this album the trademark of the band. While their second album, aptly named Zwei ("Two"), released in 2001, held the same high textual, musical and technical standard, it did not have the same impact as their debut album. With the upcoming EP "Discjockeys" the group announced their farewell.

Since 2003 both group members have gone their own way. Dendemann released the EP "DasSchweigenDilemma" in the autumn of that same year and in September 2006 the LP Die Pfütze des Eisbergs. DJ Rabauke has mostly been working as a DJ in the house scene and has, among other things, played at the Melt! festival.

== Discography ==
=== Albums ===
- 1999 - Gefährliches Halbwissen (Yo Mama)
- 2001 - Zwei (Yo Mama)

Year	Title	Chart Positions		
Year	Title	GER	AUT	CH
1999	Gefährliches Halbwissen	10	18	
2001	Zwei	11	29	86

=== Singles ===
- 1998 - "Sport"
- 1999 - "Danke, gut" (Yo Mama)
- 1999 - "Hand aufs Herz" (Yo Mama)
- 1999 - "Tschuldigung/Weltretten 4-" (Yo Mama)
- 2001 - "Bombe/Undsoweiter" (Yo Mama)
- 2003 - "Discjockeys" - (EP, Yo Mama)

Year	Title	Chart Positions			Album
Year	Title	GER	AUT	SWI	Album
1998	Sport (EP)				
1999	Danke, gut				Gefährliches Halbwissen
1999	Hand aufs Herz	53			Gefährliches Halbwissen
1999	Tschuldigung / Weltretten 4-				
2001	Bombe / Undsoweiter				Zwei
2001	Discjockeys (EP)	98			
