= Fussball ist immer noch wichtig =

2006 single by Fettes Brot, Bela B., Marcus Wiebusch and Carsten Friedrichs

Single by Fettes Brot, Bela B., Marcus Wiebusch & Carsten Friedrichs
- Released: 4 August 2006
- Genre: Pop
- Label: Fettes Brot Schallplatten
- Songwriter(s): Fettes Brot, Bela B.

Fettes Brot singles chronology
"Soll das alles sein" (2006)	"Fussball ist immer noch wichtig" (2006)	"Bettina, zieh dir bitte etwas an!" (2008)

Bela B. singles chronology
"1. 2. 3. ..." (2006)	"Fussball ist immer noch wichtig" (2006)	"Sie hat was vermisst" (2006)

"Fussball ist immer noch wichtig" (Football is still important) is a song by Fettes Brot, Bela B. of Die Ärzte, Marcus Wiebusch of Kettcar and Carsten Friedrichs of Superpunk. It was written for the 2006 FIFA World Cup and is about reviving the belief in football.

There is also an instrumental version of the song, only available as a digital download.

== Video ==
The video shows artists recording the song in studio.

== Track listing ==
1. Fussball ist immer noch wichtig
2. Fussball ist immer noch wichtig (Video)
