= Bela B =

German rock musician

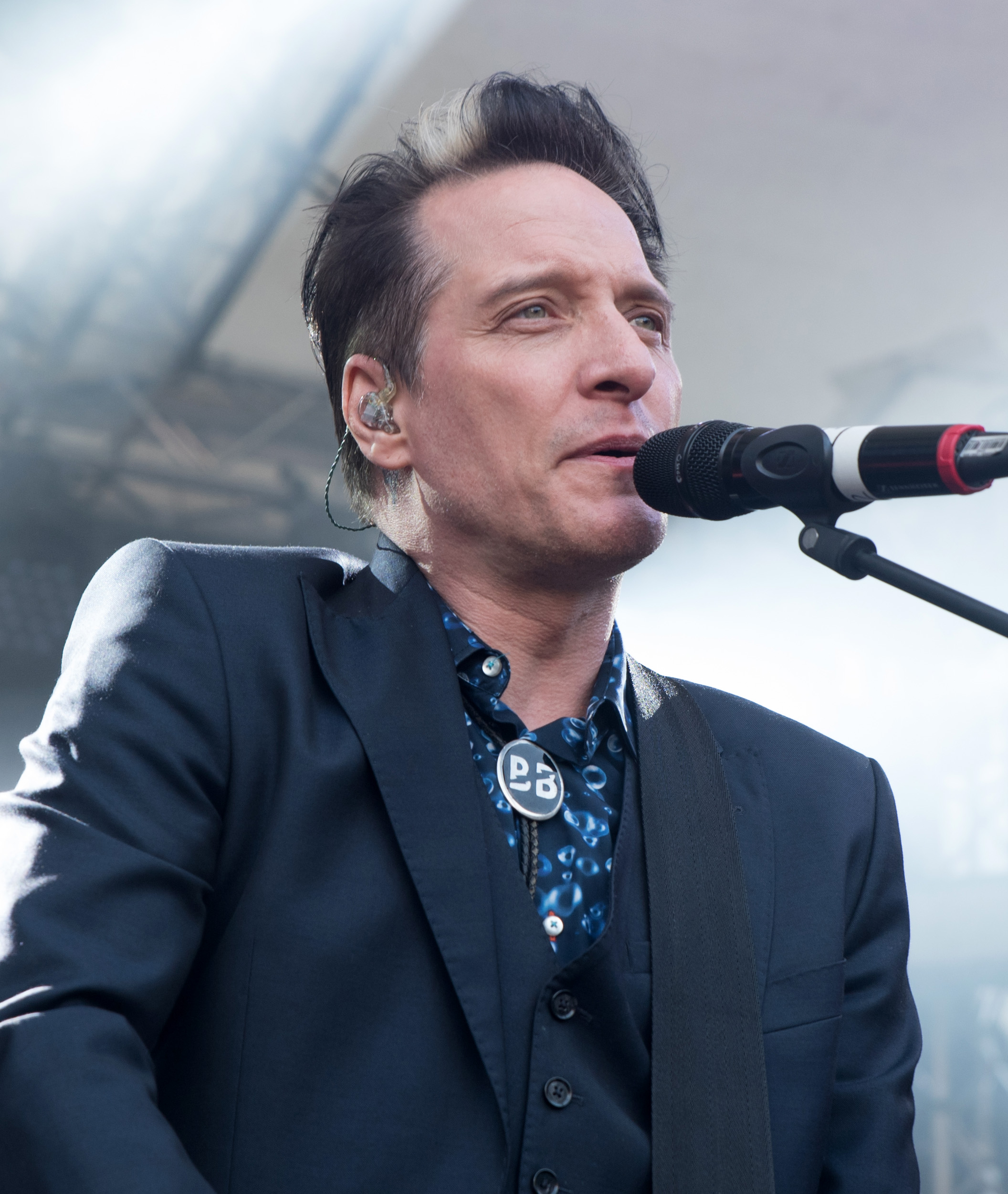
- Bela B performing in 2016

Background information
- Also known as: Bela B Felsenheimer; Der Graf; Pornoboy
- Born: Dirk Albert Felsenheimer; 14 December 1962 (age 63); Spandau, West Berlin, West Germany
- Genres: Rock; punk rock; country rock; alternative rock; hard rock; pop rock; alternative country
- Occupations: Musician; singer; songwriter; actor; voice actor; author
- Instruments: Vocals; drums; guitar
- Member of: Die Ärzte
- Formerly of: Depp Jones
- Website: bela-b.de

Dirk Albert Felsenheimer (born 14 December 1962), better known under his stage name Bela B (formerly Bela B.), is a German musician, songwriter, actor and author, best known for being the drummer and one of the singers of punk rock band Die Ärzte. In 2006, he released his first solo album entitled Bingo. He is also an actor and has done several voice-overs for television and film.

== Early life ==
Dirk Albert Felsenheimer was born in Spandau, the westernmost borough of Berlin. He has a twin sister named Diana and his parents separated when he was five years old. Felsenheimer graduated from the Carlo-Schmid-Oberschule in Berlin. Afterwards he joined the police force, partly due to boredom and partly because of the influence of his uncle, who was also a police officer. However, shortly before joining the force Bela became punk, which seemed at odds with the conformity required of him in the police. Despite his reservations, he began police training, as he could think of no other viable option and he did not want his mother to worry about him. However, he quit the force soon after joining because he felt that he did not belong there and he began being harassed by the other recruits. He then worked in a warehouse for a short time before beginning a three-year apprenticeship as a window-dresser for the department store Hertie.

Felsenheimer took his stage name from Dracula actor Bela Lugosi, whom he has admired since childhood. The "B" stands for Barney, as the German name of the fictional The Flintstones character Barney Rubble is "Barney Geröllheimer", and he was nicknamed after him because of the similarity to "Felsenheimer". Felsenheimer is actually registered with the German performing rights society GEMA as 'Bela Barney Felsenheimer'.

== Music career ==
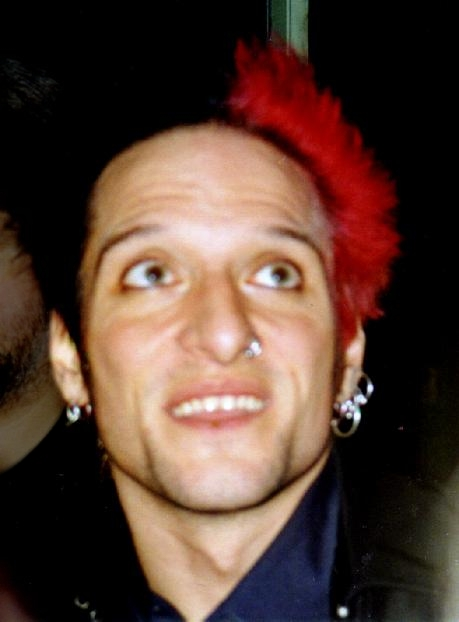
Bela B in 1998

=== Die Ärzte ===
Bela B first played in the short-lived Soilent Grün before co-founding Die Ärzte in 1982 with singer/guitarist Farin Urlaub and bassist Hans Runge. The group soon appeared on the Ein Vollrausch in Stereo - 20 Schäumende Stimmungshits compilation, and after winning an amateur band contest, they spent their winnings on their 1983 debut EP, Uns geht's prima... They signed a record deal with Columbia Records, which issued the band's debut album, Debil, in 1984. After releasing several albums, the band broke up in 1988 and reunited in 1993.

=== Depp Jones ===
After Die Ärzte split up, he soon formed a new band, S.U.M.P, with friend Rodrigo González and the band released an EP entitled Get Wise, Get Ugly, Get S.U.M.P. featuring cover versions of popular songs. The band was later renamed Depp Jones, named after a character in the German version of the comic book series Lucky Luke. Their 1990 debut LP, Return to Caramba!, failed to capitalise on the popularity of Die Ärzte, and its follow-ups Welcome to Hell and At 2012 A.D. did even worse. Farin Urlaub's new band, King Køng, also struggled, and in 1993 he and Bela B agreed to reform Die Ärzte, with former Depp Jones guitarist Rodrigo González joining them on bass.

=== Solo ===
In 2006, Bela released his first solo album Bingo, which was produced by Wayne Jackson and Olsen Involtini. The record combined many different music styles such as country, rockabilly, beat music and traditional rock elements, he also, unlike on his songs with Die Ärzte, plays guitar. Bela's love for horror can be heard in many of the songs on the album. He worked with country legend Lee Hazlewood and in return guested on his album Cake or Death. Charlotte Roche and Bela's close friend, singer Lula, also feature on Bingo. Bela's record reached number two at the German Top 100 and number five in Austria. Following the album release, Bela toured with his band Bela B. y Los Helmstedt, including appearances at several German festivals including Rock im Park, Rock am Ring, MTV Campus Invasion, and Gurtenfestival. A follow-up record, Code B was released on 2 October 2009.

== Musical style ==
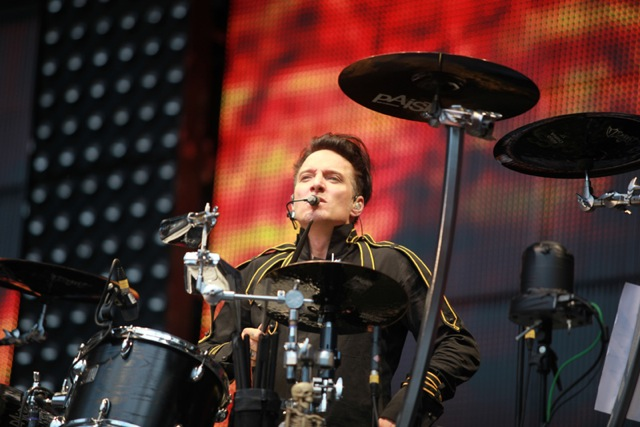
Bela B drumming in 2013

Bela is a fan of horror, which is reflected in many of his songs, such as "Dein Vampyr" (Your Vampire), "Mysteryland", "Der Graf" (The Count), "Die Nacht" (The Night), "Wir werden schön" (We Become Beautiful), "Der Vampir mit dem Colt" (The Vampire with the Colt), "Licht am Ende des Sarges" (Light at the End of the Coffin), and "Monsterparty".

One of Bela's particular features is that he usually plays drums standing up during performances. He has done this since he saw the Stray Cats perform in 1983. Up to that point he had performed sitting down for the first Die Ärzte concerts. However, he generally plays sitting down in the studio, and also performed seated during the Rock'n'Roll Realschule concert and at times during the "Jenseits der Grenze des Zumutbaren" ("Beyond the Reasonable Limit") and "Unrockstar" tours.

== Acting and other ventures ==
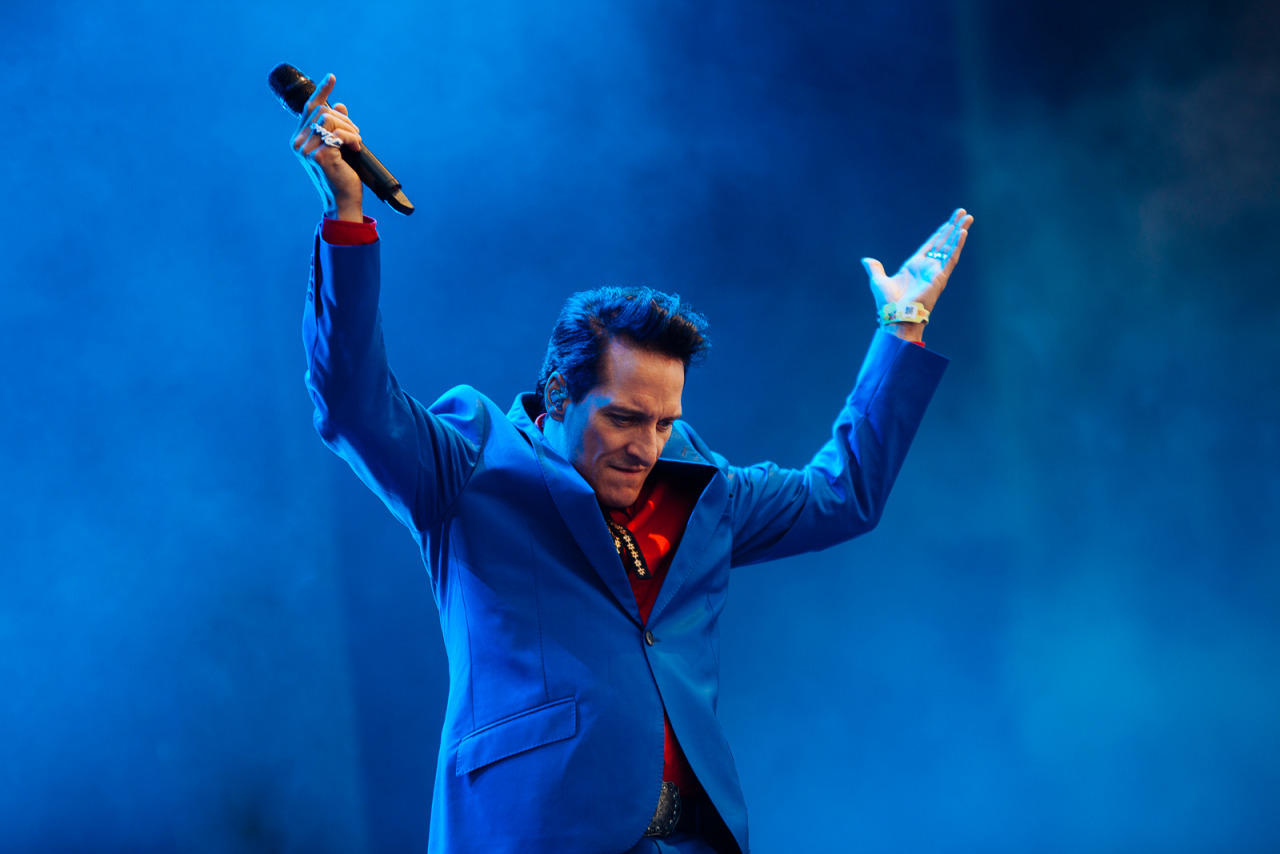
Bela B at Highfield Festival 2014

Bela B was the owner of the Leipzig comic book publisher Extrem Erfolgreich Enterprises (Extremely Successful Enterprises), which published horror comic books, including German versions of independent series such as "Faust" and "Satanika". Their titles also included their own publications such as "Schweinevogel" and a comic about Die Ärzte. In an interview with the Berlin magazine Zitty in September 2006, Bela B announced that he was giving up his publishing project.

As an author, Bela has written for the vampire anthology Liber Vampirorum: Last Blood and for comic books published by his publishing house.

Other hobbies include acting and he has appeared in many German television productions, including episodes of Alarm für Cobra 11 and Tatort, as well as in Gonger for the German television channel ProSieben in 2008 and in the film A Goddamn Job. In 1985, Bela portrayed one of the main characters in Richy Guitar, a film about an aspiring rock band which also starred his Die Ärzte bandmates Farin Urlaub and Hans Runge. More recently, Bela played the lead role of concentration camp prisoner Hans Steinbrück in the 2004 film Edelweiss Pirates. In 2005 Bela's acting roles included a role in the short film Kingz (directed by Benni Diez and Marinko Spahić), which was produced by the Film Academy Baden-Württemberg, as well as the role of Ronnie in Barbara Gebler's crime parody, Salamander. In 2007, Bela interviewed his favorite director, Quentin Tarantino, about the film Death Proof for the German newspaper Die Welt and later had a cameo role as a cinema usher in Tarantino's 2009 film Inglourious Basterds.

Bela's voice-over work includes the voice of Clay in the German version of the MTV cartoon television series Free for All. He also recorded the voices of various characters in the German version of the Danish film Terkel in Trouble. His work also includes several audio dramas, such as Faust vs. Mephisto alongside Thomas D from the German band Die Fantastischen Vier and the audiobook Venus in Furs with actress Catherine Flemming. He also recorded the audio version of a biography of Elvis Presley in 2007.

In early 2011, Bela recorded another audio book, Exit Mundi, a popular scientific book by the Dutch science journalist Maarten Keulemans discussing many possible and absurd end-of-world scenarios. The promotion tour took Bela on 15 venues, reading on stage in Germany, Austria and Switzerland. The tour also included gimmicks, such as Bela reading from the book to the tune of R.E.M.'s hit single "The End of the World as We Know It".

In 2019 Bela published his first novel, titled Scharnow.

== Personal life ==
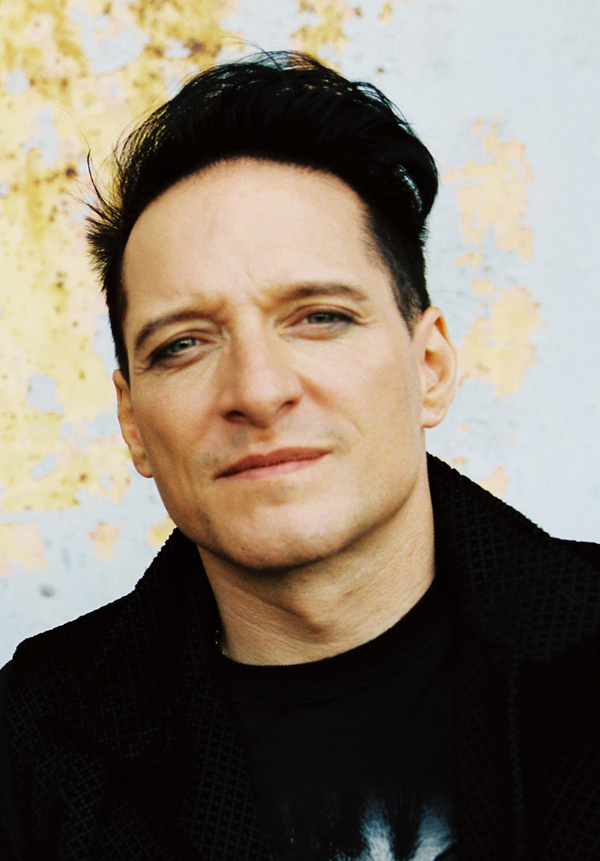
Bela B in 2012

Bela B lives with his girlfriend Konstanze Habermann and their son in Hamburg. He's been living vegan since 2011.

He is a fan of the German football team FC St. Pauli. He is also a keen runner, having completed marathons in Hamburg and New York. In 2004, he completed the 20 km event in the 26th Ahrensburg Lümmellauf and the Dracula Transylvania Marathon from Sighişoara to Mediaş, Romania.

Bela B has also supported many anti-fascist projects, including the initiative "Kein Bock auf Nazis" (No Room for Nazis), which was started by the Berlin punk band ZSK. His anti-fascist stance has also been shown in songs such as "Schrei nach Liebe" (Cry for Love) and also "Deutsche, kauft nicht bei Nazis" (Germans, Don't Buy from Nazis). Bela made the latter available to download for free from his website.

Bela is also a big fan of The Simpsons and has expressed a wish to appear in the series.

== Discography ==
=== Solo artist ===
==== Albums ====
- Bingo (2006)
- Code B (2009)
- Bye (2014)
- Bastard (2017)

==== Singles ====
Charting singles

Year	Name	Chart positions			Album
Year	Name	GER	AUT	SWI	Album
2006	"Tag mit Schutzumschlag"	13	21	–	Bingo
2006	"1. 2. 3. ..."	16	37	95	Bingo
2006	"Sie hat was vermisst"	47	–	–	Bingo
2007	"Gitarre runter"	62	–	–	Bingo
2009	"Altes Arschloch Liebe"	41	54	–	Code B
2009	"Schwarz/Weiss"	83	–	–	Code B
2010	"Tag für Sieger"	72	–	–	
2010	"In diesem Leben"	–	–	–	Code B
2013	"Im Klub" (with Peta Devlin & Smokestack Lightnin')	–	–	–	
2014	"Abserviert" (with Peta Devlin & Smokestack Lightnin')	74	–	–	Bye

Other singles

- "Pogo Dancing" (1989) – with PVC
- "Grönemeyer kann nicht tanzen" (1989) – as a producer for Wiglaf Droste's single
- "Wir brauchen... Werner" (1990) – with Jan aka Farin Urlaub
- "This Girl Was Made for Loving" (1997) – with Heike Makatsch, as Heike & Dirk for the soundtrack of "Obsession"
- "Leave" (2000) – with Lula for the soundtrack of "Kaliber Deluxe"
- "Chocolate for the Tears" (2000) – with Diane Lemonbaby for the soundtrack of "Kaliber Deluxe"
- "You'll Never Walk Alone" (2002) – Bela B. & the Tikiwolves feat. Gary'o'Wolf (official FC St. Pauli hymn)
- "Candy" (2002) – Killer Barbies feat. Bela B.
- "Tanzverbot (Schill to Hell)" (2003) – with Fettes Brot
- "Tag mit Schutzumschlag" (2006) – from "Bingo"
- "1. 2. 3. ..." (2006) – featuring Charlotte Roche; from "Bingo"
- "Fussball ist immer noch wichtig" (2006) – with Fettes Brot, Marcus Wiebusch of Kettcar and Carsten Friedrichs of Superpunk
- "Sie hat was vermisst" (2006) – from "Bingo"
- "Der Graf vs. Horrorpunks" (2007) – split-EP with Balzac
- "Gitarre runter" (2007) – from "Bingo"
- "Hölle" (2008) – K.I.Z feat. Bela B.
- "Altes Arschloch Liebe" (2009) – from "Code B"
- "Schwarz/Weiss" (2009) – from "Code B"
- "Tag für Sieger" (2010)
- "In diesem Leben" (download only) (2010) – from "Code B"
- "Im Klub" (2013) – with Peta Devlin & Smokestack Lightnin'
- "Abserviert" (2014) – from "Bye" with Peta Devlin & Smokestack Lightnin'

==== Other collaborations ====
- "Ausgebombt" (German Version) (1989) – Sodom featuring Bela B.; for Sodom's EP "Ausgebombt"
- "Requiem für Nossek" (1989) – The Incredible Hagen feat. Jan Vetter & Bela B.; for the soundtrack of "Lindenstraße", titled "Wir warten auf die Lindenstraße"
- "Stand by Your Man" (1994) – The Waltons featuring Bela B.; for the album "Essential Country Bullshit"
- "Donna Clara" (1995) – The Bates featuring Bela B. & Kill Kill Gaskrieg; for the album "Pleasure + Pain"
- "Die Zeitmaschine" (1995) – with Rod Gonzalez as 2 Fickende Hunde for the Prollhead tribute album "Prollhead! fordert Tribut..."
- "It's Only Love" (1996) – Stimpy featuring Bela B.; for the album "Dirty Love Affair"
- "König von Deutschland" (1998) – C.I.A. featuring Bela B. and Axel Kurth; for the album "Codename Freibeuter"
- "All This and More" (1998) – Mad Sin featuring Bela B.; for the album "...Sweet & Innocent? ...Loud & Dirty!"
- "Dusty Crown" (1998) – as Mr. Felsenheimer & Perry Spinoza Gang; for the compilation "Der FC St. Pauli ist schuld..."
- "It's a Good Life" (2000) – Chainsaw Hollies featuring Bela B.
- "Are You Ready for Some Darkness?" (2001) – with Denim Girl aka Jasmin Wagner for "Alpha Motherfuckers – A Tribute to Turbonegro"
- "Gerechtigkeit" (2001) – Die Göttlichen feat. Bela B.; for the soundtrack of "A Goddamn Job"
- "Bad Capricorn" (2003) – The Yucca Spiders featuring Bela B.; for the album "Zodiac"
- "Dee Dee's Dead" (2004) – Ramonez 77 featuring Bela B.; for the album "Rest in Pace"
- "Für immer Christ" (2004) – Jesus Skins featuring Bela B.; for the split-album with Jewdriver, "Neuer Wein/Hail the Jew Dawn"
- "Operation Dance Sensation" (2005) – Bela B. & ZZZ Hacker feat. DJ Wolfgang Jack; for the soundtrack of "Operation Dance Sensation"
- "Meister aller Frauenärzte" (2005) – with Rod Gonzalez as 2 Fickende Hunde for the Die Kassierer tribute album "Kunst! 20 Jahre die Kassierer"
- "Who Will Save Rock'n'Roll?" (2005) – Gigantor featuring Bela B., Doro Pesch and Olga of Toy Dolls; for the album "G7"
- "Iron in My Soul" & "No Cure for the Undead" (2005) – Smoke Blow featuring Bela B.; for the album "Dark Angel"
- "The First Song of the Day" (2006) – with Lee Hazlewood; for the album "Cake or Death" (it is actually the same song as "Lee Hazlewood & das erste Lied des Tages" from "Bingo" but with an English title)
- "I Want" (2008) – with Lula for her debut album "Lost in Reverie"

== Audio books ==
- Die Nixe/The Mermaid (Christa Fast) (1992)
- Die Brautprinzessin (2002)
- The KLF der schnelle Weg zum Nr. 1 Hit (2003)
- Gabriel Burns – Folge 6, Die Totenmaschine (as barkeeper) (2004)
- Thomas D vs. Bela B – Faust vs. Mephisto (2004)
- Venus im Pelz (2005)
- Böse Nacht Geschichten (2005)
- Captain Berlin vs. Dracula (from Jörg Buttgereit) (2006)
- Vampira-Hörspiel-Reihe by Lübbe Audio (2006)
- Last Train to Memphis (part 1 of an Elvis Presley biography written by Peter Guralnick) (2007)
- Careless Love (part 2 of an Elvis Presley biography written by Peter Guralnick) (2007)
- Kill your friends (by John Niven) (2009)
- Exit Mundi – die besten Weltuntergänge (by Maarten Keulemans & A.W. Bruna Uitgevers) (2011)
- Sartana – noch warm und schon Sand drauf (based on a 1970 Spaghetti Western) (2016)

== Filmography ==
- SinnFilm (1980)
- Edith Schröder – eine deutsche Hausfrau (1981)
- Manne – the Muwi (1981)
- Captain Berlin – Retter der Welt (1982)
- Richy Guitar (1985)
- Der Todesking (1990)
- Over the Rainbow (1998)
- Nass (1999)
- Salamander (1999)
- Laila – Unsterblich verliebt (2000)
- Bloody Weekend (2000)
- A Goddamn Job (2000)
- Horrorskop – Bela B. blickt in die Sterne (2001)
- At Night in the Park (2001)
- Puzzle Punk (2002)
- Tatort: Totentanz (2002)
- The Killer Barbies Versus Dracula (2002)
- Kinder der Nacht 2 (2002)
- Honey Baby (2002)
- Space Wolf (2002)
- Höhenluft (2002)
- Garden of Love (2003)
- Nikos the Impaler (2003), cameo
- Operation Dance Sensation (2003)
- Kein Blut. Nirgends. Eine romantische Axtmördergeschichte (2003)
- Alarm für Cobra 11 – Die Autobahnpolizei
  - Feuertaufe (2003)
  - Für Immer und Ewig (2004)
- Edelweiss Pirates (2004)
- No Snow (2005)
- Sportsman of the Century (2005)
- Wilsberg: Todesengel (2005)
- The Challenge (2005)
- Terkel in Trouble (2005), voice-over for every character in the film, plus all songs in German
- Free for All (2005) (voice-over)
- Vineta (2006)
- Deichking (2006)
- Kein Bock auf Nazis (2006) (documentary DVD)
- Dittsche (2006)
- Bye Bye Harry! (2006)
- Kingz (2007)
- Nachtschicht: Der Ausbruch (2007)
- Video Kings (2007)
- The Three Robbers (2007, voice)
- Zimbl – A Real Cool Time (2008), documentary about Markus "Zimbl" Zimmer from The Bates
- Gonger (2008)
- Olli Schulz – Mach den Bibo (2009)
- Inglourious Basterds (2009), cameo as cinema usher
- Bridges (2011)
- Der Sandmann (2012)
- Glanz & Gloria (2012)
- King Ping – Tippen Tappen Tödchen (2013)
- 3/4 (2014)
- Einstein: Elvis lebt (2017), as Martin Stude
- Sharknado 5: Global Swarming (2017)
- The Last Supper (2018)
- Right Here Right Now (2018)
- Leif in Concert Vol. 2 (2019)
- M – Eine Stadt sucht einen Mörder (2019)
- Die Geschichte der Menschheit - leicht gekürzt (2022)
- Polizeiruf 110: Keiner von uns (2022), as Jo Mennecke
