= The Killer Barbies =

Spanish punk rock band

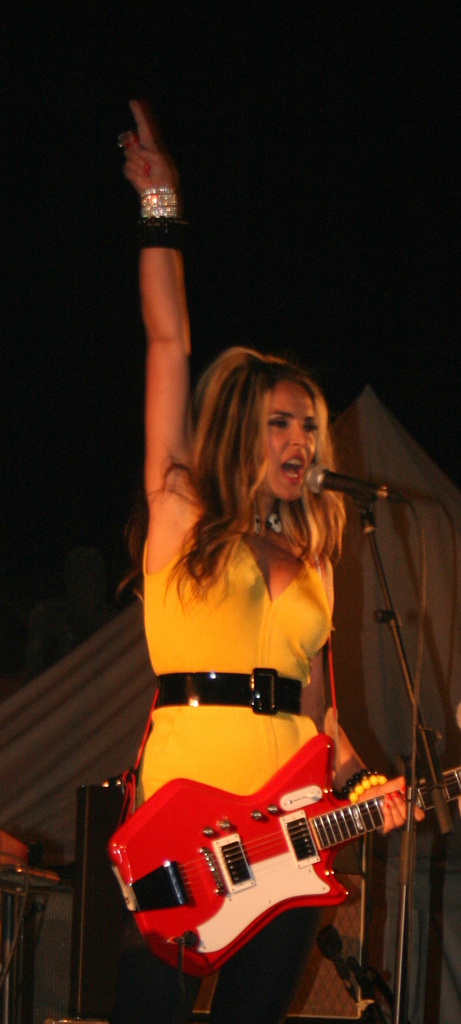
- Silvia Superstar of The Killer Barbies at a live concert in 2009

Background information
- Origin: Vigo, Galicia (Spain)
- Genres: Punk rock
- Years active: 1994–present
- Labels: Subteruge Records; Drakkar Records; Toxic Records
- Members: Silvia Superstar; Billy King
- Past members: Santai-Santai; De Yogui Bear; Dr. Gonzo; Super Bingo; Kabuto Jr. Maxter Man; Jeyper Man; Blue Demon; Doctor Muerte; Godzilla

The Killer Barbies is a Spanish punk rock band fronted by singer/guitarist Silvia Superstar. After some success in Spain on the independent label Toxic Records, they got an international distribution through the German label Drakkar Records in 2000.

The band also starred in a series of two films directed by the prolific exploitation film director Jesús Franco: Killer Barbys (1996) and Killer Barbys vs. Dracula (2003).

== Biography ==
Silvia Superstar (real name: Silvia García Pintos) and Billy King (real name: Antonio Domínguez) formed The Killer Barbies in 1994 and quickly began releasing their material on the Spanish independent label Toxic Records. They released their first album, Dressed to Kiss, in 1995. In 1996, they released a second album, ...Only for Freaks!, shortly after starring in the Jesús Franco film, Killer Barbys. They recorded a third album in 1998, Big Muff. The three albums sold more than 10,000 copies each.

After these three successful albums in Spain, the band signed to the German label Drakkar Records to get a larger audience outside Spain. In 2000, they released their international debut album Bad Taste, containing a selection of re-recorded songs from their first three albums. In 2002, they released the single "Candy", featuring a vocal participation of Bela B. of Die Ärzte fame and next released some new material with the album Sin Is In and starred in a second Jesús Franco film, Killer Barbys vs. Dracula, in 2003. Since then, they have been silent except for releasing a compilation of B-sides, Freakshow, in 2004, which also contained a DVD of the band's music videos and some live footage. That same year, Silvia Superstar was featured on the show Die drei ??? und die singende Schlange by the German comedy theater company Das Vollplaybacktheater.

== Discography ==
=== Singles and EPs ===
- "Maqueta" (1994) demo tape
- "I Wanna Live in Tromaville" (1994) single
- "Elvis Live!!" (1994) single
- "Comic Books" (1994) single
- "Killer Barbies/Aneurol 50" (1995) split single
- "Love Killer" (1996) single
- "Freaktown" (1996) single
- Attack of the Killer Barbies (1997) EP
- "Crazy" (1997) single
- "Mars" (2000) single
- "Downtown" (2000) single
- "Candy" (2002) single

=== Albums ===
- Dressed to Kiss (1995)
- ...Only for Freaks! (1996)
- Big Muff (1998)
- Fucking Cool (1999) a remix album
- Bad Taste (2000) a re-recording of a selection of songs from the band's first three albums
- Sin Is In (2003)
- Freakshow (2004) a DVD/CD set; the DVD contains the band's music videos and some live footage and the CD is a compilation of B-sides
- Vive le punk! (2020)
- El pop se autodestruirá en 4, 3, 2, 1 (2024)

=== Songs from compilation albums ===
- "Xabarin Contra el Doctor No" (1995) from A Cantar Con Xabarin
- "Spiderman" (1996) from A Cantar con Xabarin Volumen III e IV
- "Hackers" (1996) from Corsarios del Chip B.S.O.
- "Ma Baker" (1996) from Best in Spain
- "El Resplandor" and "Sólo Para Ti" (1999) from Intoxicación
- "Gente Pez" and "Autosuficiencia" (2001) from Gente Pez
- "These Boots Are Made For Walking" (2001) from Zapping
- "Bajo mi Piel" (2003) from Marea de Musica
- "A Thing About You" (2005) from A Tribute to Tom Petty
- "Feeling Alone" (2007) from Little Steven's Underground Garage Presents The Coolest Songs in the World! Vol. 3

== Films ==
The band was featured as the main characters of a series of two films directed by Jesús Franco: Killer Barbys, which was made in relation to their first album, Dressed to Kiss, in 1996, and Killer Barbys vs. Dracula, which was made in relation to their last album to date, Sin Is In, in 2003. The spelling of the band's name was changed in the films' titles because Mattel would not let them use the Barbie name.

== Appearances in video games ==
- The Killer Barbies' song "Have Some Fun" was featured in the video game Rumble Roses as Candy Cane's entrance music.
- In Rumble Roses XX, the name "The Killer Barbies" is retained as Candy Cane's band; however, the song "Crazy!" is not the same song as The Killer Barbies' song "Crazy".
- The Killer Barbies' songs "Baby With Two Heads" and "Down the Street" were featured in the video game FlatOut.
