= Manuwa =

Manuwa or Manuva is a surname. Notable people with the surname include:

- Jimi Manuwa (born 1980), American-born English mixed martial artist
- Roots Manuva (born 1972), English rapper and producer
- Samuel Manuwa (1903–1976), Nigerian surgeon
