= Johanna Zeul =

German singer songwriter (born 1981)

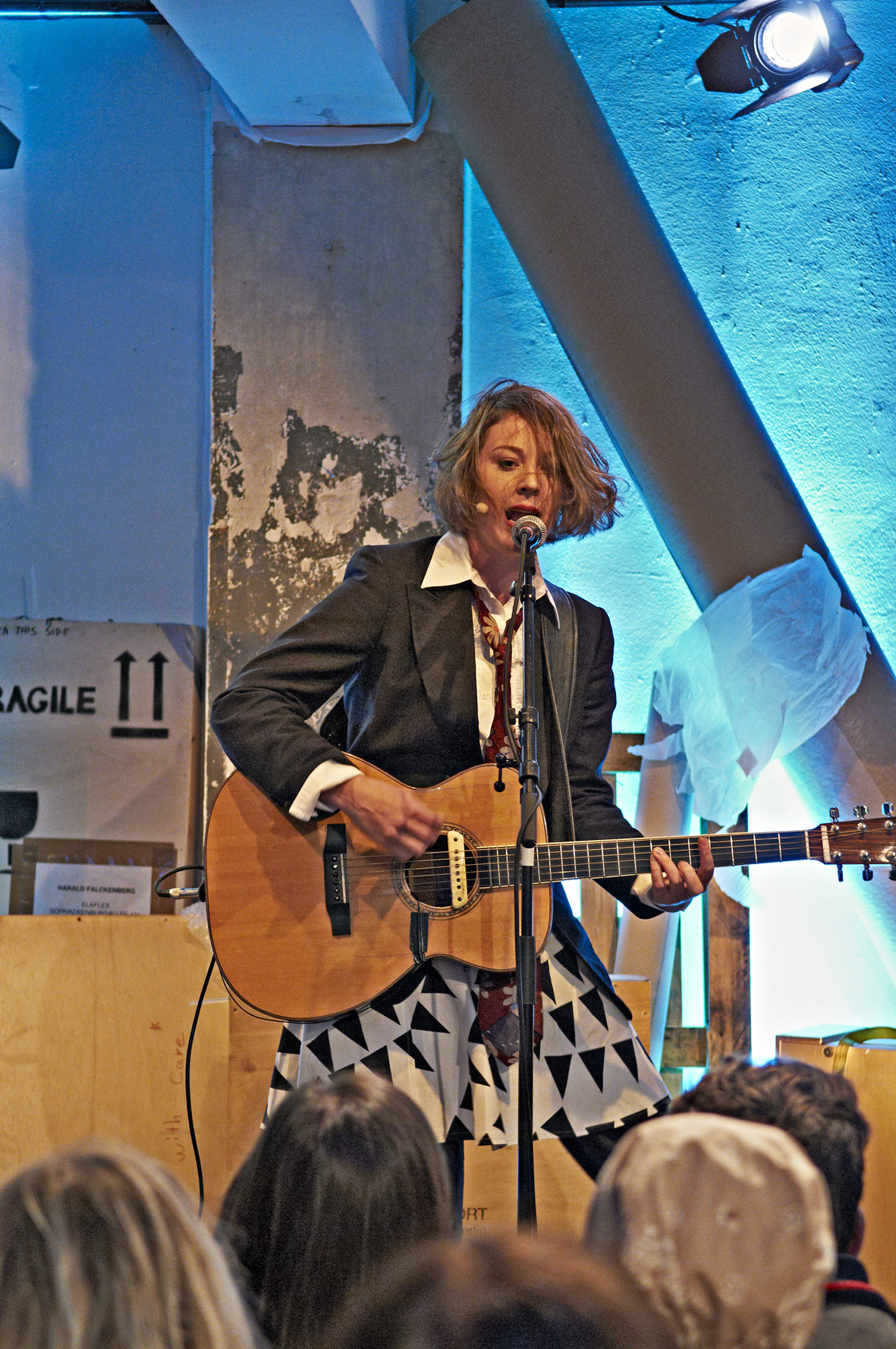
Johanna Zeul

Johanna Zeul (born 2 June 1981 in Filderstadt, Baden-Württemberg) is a German singer songwriter.

== History ==
Zeul has been giving concerts since 1996. She studied Pop Music Design at the Popakademie in Mannheim, Germany and took classes at an acting school in Mainz. In April 2008 together with Martingo, she founded the record label Gold und Tier where she also produced her first album, Album Nr. 1 (Album No. 1). Zeul's songs are unconventional pop songs in German with folk and rock influences. The song Ich will was Neues (I want something new) held 10th position on the folk hitparade ('Liederbestenliste') in March and April 2009. In October 2010 a live album has been released when Zeul lived in the Berlin district of Neuköll. She gave birth to two children. Mila Coco was born 2011 in Magdeburg after a long hospitalization because of problems during the pregnancy. Her sister Billie Marla was born two years later on the Island of Rügen. During her second pregnancy Johanna Zeul had to lay in the hospital again for many weeks. Zeul managed herself completely alone. She has been booking and promoting her shows, creating her coverartworks and advertisement. Besides she has been a caring and lovingly mother and went on tour alone with her both small children. 2018 Zeul recorded 18 songs live in the Studio Nord in Bremen Oberneuland, first or second take, together with Masataka Koduka (Bass) and Kays Elbeyli (Human Beat Box). A few of the songs, amongst them the climate Hymn Eisbär, have been released as Singles 2019. Zeul recorded more Songs in 2020 and 2021. This time she was supported by the vocal group Die Stracciatella Boyz and the Human Beat Boxer Kays Elbeyli (RAZZZ, Berlin). In the Song „Tütensuppe" Fridays For Future Kids were singing a children choir. Since 2019 Johanna Zeul has released digital Singles on all streaming platforms and shops.

== Albums ==
"Album Nr. 1" (2008)

"Johanna Zeul – Live" (2010)

„Eisbär“ (2019)

„Labyrinth“ (2019) – Top Twenty in the Liederbestenliste

„Reise zum Mond“ (2019)

„Dein Schatten weint“ (2021)

„Ich will Liebe machen“ (2021)

„Du bringst mich um“ (2021)

„Tütensuppe“ (2021)

„Ich schwör" (2021)

"Lovefone" (2021)
