= Bäst of =

Greatest hits album by Die Ärzte
- Released: 6 October 2006
- Recorded: 1993–2003
- Genre: Punk rock; pop punk; alternative rock
- Length: 177:48
- Label: Hot Action
- Producer: Uwe Hoffmann & Die Ärzte

Die Ärzte chronology
Devil (2005)	Bäst of (2006)	Jazz ist anders (2007)

Bäst of is a greatest hits album by German rock band Die Ärzte, containing singles from 1993 to 2004 and some of their B-sides. The album comes in a metal box.

== Track listing ==
CD 1 – Alle Singles seit 1993 ("Every single since 1993")

1. "Schrei nach Liebe" [Cry for love] – 4:12
2. "Mach die Augen zu" [Close your eyes] – 3:58
3. "Friedenspanzer" (Single-Version) [Peace tank] – 3:58
4. "Quark" (Album-Version) [Rubbish; lit: Curd] – 2:45
5. "Kopfüber in die Hölle/Revolution" (Single-Version "Revolution '94") [Headfirst into hell] – 2:59
6. "Schunder-Song" (Single-Version) – 2:58
7. "Hurra" (Single-Version) [Hooray] – 3:26
8. "3-Tage-Bart" [Designer stubble, lit: 3-Days-Beard] – 3:02
9. "Mein Baby war beim Frisör" [My Baby got a haircut] – 2:15
10. "Männer sind Schweine" (Single-Version) [Men are pigs] – 4:27
11. "Goldenes Handwerk" [Golden handicraft] – 3:34
12. "1/2 Lovesong" – 3:52
13. "Rebell" [Rebel] – 3:51
14. "Elke" (live), Single-Version) – 3:37
15. "Wie es geht" (Single-Version) [How it works] – 3:42
16. "Manchmal haben Frauen..." [Sometimes, women have...] – 4:13
17. "Yoko Ono" (Album-Version) – 0:30
18. "Rock'n'Roll-Übermensch" (Single-Version) [Rock'n'roll Übermensch] – 3:54
19. "Komm zurück (unplugged)" [Come back] – 3:28
20. "Die Banane (unplugged)" [The banana] – 4:59
21. "Unrockbar" (Single-Version) [Unrockable] – 3:44
22. "Dinge von denen" [Things of which] – 3:54
23. "Nichts in der Welt" [Nothing in the world] – 3:50
24. "Deine Schuld" [Your fault] – 3:35
25. "Die klügsten Männer der Welt" [The wisest men in the world] – 3:58

Total time: 88:41

CD 2 – B-Seiten ("B-sides")

1. "Wahre Liebe" [True love] – 3:12
2. "Punkrockgirl" (Original-Version) – 1:50
3. "Stick It Out/What's the Ugliest Part of Your Body" – 3:08
4. "Regierung" [Government] – 2:30
5. "Sex Me, Baby" – 2:51
6. "Warrumska" – 3:50
7. "Saufen" [Quaffing] – 3:47
8. "Ein Lächeln (für jeden Tag deines Lebens)" [A smile (for every day of your life)] – 4:21
9. "Wunderbare Welt des Farin U." [Wonderful world of Farin U.] – 2:49
10. "Rod Army" – 2:49
11. "Ein Lied über Zensur" [A song about censorship] – 3:19
12. "Schlimm" [Bad] – 3:33
13. "Danke für jeden guten Morgen" [Thank you for each good morning] – 2:42
14. "Punk ist..." (Götz Alsmann Band feat. Die Ärzte) [Punk is...] – 3:22
15. "Backpfeifengesicht" [Bitchslapface] – 2:23
16. "Alles für dich" [Everything for you] – 4:09
17. "Die Instrumente des Orchesters" [The instruments of the orchestra] – 2:36
18. "Kpt. Blaubär" (Extended Version) [Cpt. Bluebear] – 4:14
19. "Rettet die Wale" [Save the whales] – 1:48
20. "Die Welt ist schlecht" [The world is bad] – 3:39
21. "Kontovollmacht..." [Account authorization] – 4:37
22. "Aus dem Tagebuch eines Amokläufers" [From the diary of a school shooter] – 2:35
23. "Biergourmet (unplugged)" [Beergourmet] – 1:54
24. "Frank'n'stein" (Syllable-Jive-Version) – 2:31
25. "Zusamm'fassung" (Extended 1–13) [Summary] – 14:38
  - "Zusamm'fassung" is actually 13 different tracks, which are the tracks 25–37.

Total time: 89:07

== Song information ==
=== Singles ===
- Tracks 1–5 from "Die Bestie in Menschengestalt"
- Tracks 6, 7 from "Planet Punk"
- Tracks 8, 9 from "Le Frisur"
- Tracks 10–13 from "13"
- Track 14 from "Wir wollen nur deine Seele"
- Tracks 15–18 from "Runter mit den Spendierhosen, Unsichtbarer!"
- Tracks 19, 20 from "Unplugged – Rock'n'Roll Realschule"
- Tracks 21–25 from "Geräusch"

=== B-sides ===
- Tracks 1, 2 from "Mach die Augen zu"
- Track 3 from "Friedenspanzer"
- Track 4 from "Ein Song namens Schunder"
- Tracks 5, 6 from "Hurra"
- Tracks 7, 8 from "Ein Schwein namens Männer"
- Tracks 9, 10 from "Goldenes Handwerk"
- Tracks 11–13 from "1/2 Lovesong"
- Tracks 14–16 from "Rebell"
- Tracks 17, 18 from "Wie es geht"
- Track 19 from "Manchmal haben Frauen..."
- Track 20 from "Yoko Ono"
- Tracks 21, 22 from "Unrockbar"
- Tracks 23, 24 from "Deine Schuld"
- Track 25 from "Mein Baby war beim Frisör"

== Personnel ==
- Farin Urlaub – guitar, vocals
- Bela Felsenheimer – drums, vocals
- Rodrigo González – bass, vocals

== Charts ==
=== Weekly charts ===
Chart (2006)	Peak position
Austrian Albums (Ö3 Austria)	1
German Albums (Offizielle Top 100)	1
Swiss Albums (Schweizer Hitparade)	4

=== Year-end charts ===
Chart (2006)	Position
Austrian Albums (Ö3 Austria)	42
German Albums (Offizielle Top 100)	40
Swiss Albums (Schweizer Hitparade)	75

Chart (2007)	Position
German Albums (Offizielle Top 100)	60

Chart (2008)	Position
German Albums (Offizielle Top 100)	59

== Certifications ==
Region	Certification	Certified units/sales
Germany (BVMI)	Platinum	200,000^{^}
Switzerland (IFPI Switzerland)	Gold	15,000^{^}
^{^} Shipments figures based on certification alone.
