= Wir wollen nur deine Seele =

Live album by Die Ärzte
- Released: 22 November 1999
- Recorded: Berlin, 14 June 1994 by Radio Fritz; Bonn, 7 November 1995 by Eins Live; Rock am Ring, 18 May 1997 at Rock am Ring by MTV; Heilbronn, 14 September 1998; Siegen, 11 October 1998; Mannheim, 12 October 1998; Saarbrücken, 7 November 1998 with GAGA-Mobil
- Genre: Punk rock
- Label: Hot Action
- Producer: Uwe Hoffmann, Die Ärzte

Die Ärzte chronology
13 (1998)	Wir wollen nur deine Seele (1999)	Satanische Pferde (1999)

Wir wollen nur deine Seele ("We only want your soul") is the second live album by German rock band Die Ärzte, released on 22 November 1999. It is a compilation of songs from different concerts. Leftover songs were released on Satanische Pferde, which was only available for fan club members.

The album's title is taken from a German book which was released by a Christian publisher in 1984 about the (perceived) propagation of satanism and occultism by rock musicians. This book gained a kind of cult status as a piece of real-life satire among heavy metal fans.

The subtitle of the first disc is a reference to Motörhead's successful live album No Sleep 'til Hammersmith and it also puns the heavy metal umlaut, for which Motörhead is a noted example.

"Sprüche II" on the EP contains two parts played at the same time, which means that one has to unplug the right speaker, when one wants to hear part 1 (left) and the other way around.

In December 1999, a sequel to the third disc, "Invasion der Vernunft II", was released on Die Ärzte's homepage for downloading in 24 parts, similar to an Advent calendar.

== Track listing ==
Disc one – Nö Sleep 'til Viehauktiönshalle Öldenbürg
No.	Title	Length
1.	"Ein Lied für dich" (A song for you; from 13)	2:36
2.	"Schunder-Song" (from Planet Punk)	2:41
3.	"Angeber" (Show-off; from 13)	2:29
4.	"Begrüssung" (Greeting)	0:18
5.	"Party stinkt" (Party stinks; from 13)	2:59
6.	"Ich bin reich" (I'm rich; from Die Ärzte)	3:22
7.	"Geh mit mir" (Date me; from Planet Punk)	2:23
8.	"Langweilig" (Bored; from Planet Punk)	3:13
9.	"Ignorama" (from 13)	2:37
10.	"Ich weiss nicht (ob es Liebe ist)" (I don't know (whether it's love); from Im Schatten der Ärzte)	4:56
11.	"Der Graf" (The count; from 13)	4:08
12.	"Rebell" (Rebel; from 13)	3:59
13.	"Zitroneneis" (Lemon ice-cream; from Die Ärzte früher!)	2:05
14.	"Liebe und Schmerz" (Love and pain; from 13)	3:27
15.	"Käfer" (Beetle; from Im Schatten der Ärzte)	2:34
16.	"Meine Freunde" (My friends; from 13)	1:56
17.	"Hey Huh (in Scheiben)" (In slices; from Die Bestie in Menschengestalt)	3:54
18.	"Lady" (from 13)	1:29
19.	"1/2 Lovesong" (from 13)	3:53
20.	"Der Misanthrop" (The misanthrope; from Planet Punk)	2:58
21.	"Teenager Liebe" (Teenager love; from Die Ärzte früher!)	3:05
22.	"Goldenes Handwerk"/"Punk ist..." (Golden handicraft/Punk is...; both from 13)	5:45
23.	"Schrei nach Liebe" (Cry for love; from Die Bestie in Menschengestalt)	3:06
24.	"Der lustige Astronaut" (The funny astronaut; from Die Ärzte früher!)	3:58

Disc two – Halt's Maul und spiel! ("Shut up and play!")
No.	Title	Length
1.	"Super Drei" (Super three; from Planet Punk)	2:30
2.	"Vermissen, Baby" (Missing, baby; from Planet Punk)	3:37
3.	"3-Tage-Bart" (Stubble; from Le Frisur)	3:16
4.	"Vokuhila" (Mullet; from Le Frisur)	3:37
5.	"Sommer, Palmen, Sonnenschein" (Summer, palms, sunshine; from Die Ärzte früher!)	2:22
6.	"Ansage" (Announcement)	3:05
7.	"Nie wieder Krieg, nie mehr Las Vegas!" (Never war again, no more Las Vegas!; from 13)	3:17
8.	"Deutschrockgirl" (Germanrockgirl; from Die Bestie in Menschengestalt)	1:38
9.	"Die traurige Ballade von Susi Spakowski" (The sad ballad of Susi Spakowski; from Planet Punk)	4:11
10.	"Dauerwelle vs. Minipli" (Permanent wave vs. minipli; from Le Frisur)	1:03
11.	"Kopfüber in die Hölle/Revolution" (Headfirst into Hell/Revolution; from Die Bestie in Menschengestalt)	2:52
12.	"Friedenspanzer" (Peace tank; from Die Bestie in Menschengestalt)	3:41
13.	"Die Allerschürfste" (The superhöttest; from Die Bestie in Menschengestalt)	1:21
14.	"BGS" (Bundesgrenzschutz - Federal Border Guard; from 1, 2, 3, 4 - Bullenstaat!)	1:25
15.	"Kopfhaut" (Scalp; from Die Ärzte früher!)	2:49
16.	"Omaboy" (Grandma boy; from Die Bestie in Menschengestalt)	6:42
17.	"Für immer" (Forever; from Die Ärzte)	3:33
18.	"Ekelpack" (Creeps; from Die Ärzte früher!)	2:01
19.	"Ein Lied über Zensur" (A song about censorship; from "1/2 Lovesong")	2:56
20.	"Mach die Augen zu" (Close your eyes; from Die Bestie in Menschengestalt)	4:24
21.	"Männer sind Schweine" (Men are pigs; from 13)	4:16
22.	"Elke" (from Das ist nicht die ganze Wahrheit...)	6:46
23.	"Gute Nacht" (Good night; from "Teenager Liebe (unecht)/Gute Nacht")	2:26

Disc three – Invasion der Vernunft ("Invasion of reason")
No.	Title	Length
1.	"Sprüche II" (Chatter II, over 40 min. of between-songs chatter split across the left and right stereo channels)	Left: 20:33; Right: 20:23

=== 6-LP vinyl version ===
LP 1: Montag (Monday)
A: Vormittag (Forenoon)
1. "Ein Lied für dich"
2. "Schunder-Song"
3. "Angeber"
4. "Begrüßung"
5. "Party stinkt"
6. "Ich bin reich"
7. "Geh mit mir"
B: Mittag (Noon)
1. "Langweilig"
2. "Ignorama"
3. "Ich weiss nicht (ob es Liebe ist)"
4. "Der Graf"
5. "Meine Freunde"
LP 2: Dienstag (Tuesday)
A: Vormittag
1. "Rebell"
2. "Zitroneneis"
3. "Liebe und Schmerz"
4. "Käfer"
5. "Hey Huh (in Scheiben)"
B: Abend (Evening)
1. "Lady"
2. "1/2 Lovesong"
3. "Der Misanthrop"
4. "Teenager Liebe"
5. "Goldenes Handwerk"/"Punk ist..."
LP 3: Donnerstag (Thursday)
A: Vormittag
1. "Schrei nach Liebe"
2. "Der lustige Astronaut"
3. "Super Drei"
4. "Vermissen, Baby"
5. "3-Tage-Bart"
B: Mittag
1. "Vokuhila"
2. "Sommer, Palmen, Sonnenschein"
3. "Nie wieder Krieg, nie mehr Las Vegas!"
4. "Deutschrockgirl"
LP 4: Freitag (Friday)
A: Vormittag
1. "Die traurige Ballade von Susi Spakowski"
2. "Dauerwelle vs. Minipli"
3. "Kopfüber in die Hölle/Revolution"
4. "Friedenspanzer"
5. "Die Allerschürfste"
6. "BGS"
B: Mittag
1. "Kopfhaut"
2. "Omaboy"
3. "Für immer"
4. "Ekelpack"
LP 5: Samstag (Saturday)
A: Vormittag
1. "Ein Lied über Zensur"
2. "Mach die Augen zu"
3. "Männer sind Schweine"
B: Mittag
1. "Elke"
2. "Gute Nacht"
LP 6: Sonntag (Sunday)
A: Vormittag
1. "Sprüche II (Teil 1)"
B: Mittag
1. "Sprüche II (Teil 2)"

== Personnel ==
- Farin Urlaub - guitar, vocals
- Bela Felsenheimer - drums, vocals
- Rodrigo González - bass guitar, vocals

== Chart performance ==
Chart (1999)	Peak position
Austrian Albums (Ö3 Austria)	16
German Albums (Offizielle Top 100)	4
Swiss Albums (Schweizer Hitparade)	9

== Certifications ==
In 2001, Wir wollen nur deine Seele was certified gold in Germany.
