= Unplugged: Rock'n'Roll Realschule =

2002 live album by Die Ärzte

Unplugged – Rock'n'Roll Realschule

Live album by Die Ärzte
- Released: 4 November 2002
- Recorded: 31 August 2002
- Genre: Punk rock, acoustic rock
- Label: Hot Action
- Producer: Uwe Hoffmann & Die Ärzte

Die Ärzte chronology
Die Ärzte (2002)	Unplugged – Rock'n'Roll Realschule (2002)	Geräusch (2003)

Singles from Unplugged - Rock'n'Roll Realschule
- 1. "Unplugged - Komm zurück/Die Banane" Released: 25 November 2002

Professional ratings
Review scores
Source	Rating
Musikexpress	6/6 stars
laut.de	4/5 stars

Unplugged – Rock'n'Roll Realschule is a live album / MTV Unplugged album by German rock band Die Ärzte. The band performed at Albert-Schweitzer-Gymnasium, Hamburg. The name comes from the song "Rock 'n' Roll High School" by the Ramones.

== Track listing ==
1. "Schrei nach Liebe" [Cry for love] – 3:54
2. "Ich ess' Blumen" [I eat flowers] – 3:23
3. "Langweilig" [Boring] – 3:42
4. "Meine Ex(plodierte Freundin)" [My ex(ploded) girlfriend)] – 2:04
5. "Monsterparty" – 3:28
6. "Hurra" [Hooray] – 3:46
7. "Kopfhaut" [Headskin] – 2:42
8. "Zu spät" [Too late] – 3:41
9. "Westerland" – 4:18
10. "1/2 Lovesong" – 4:14
11. "Komm zurück" [Come back] – 3:29
12. "Der Graf" [The Count] – 3:34
13. "Ignorama" – 2:58
14. "Is ja irre" [That's crazy] – 1:36
15. "Bitte bitte" [Please, please] – 2:59
16. "Mit dem Schwert nach Polen, warum René?" [With a sword to Poland, why René?] – 4:36
17. "Die Banane" [The banana] – 4:59
18. "Manchmal haben Frauen..." [Sometimes, women have...] – 5:28
19. "Medley" – 4:59
  - "Ohne dich" [Without you]
  - "Paul"
  - "Quark" [Rubbish; lit: Curd]
  - "Schunder-Song"
  - "Meine Freunde" [My friends]
  - "Nie wieder Krieg, nie mehr Las Vegas!" [No more war, no more Las Vegas!]
  - "Rettet die Wale" [Save the whales]
  - "Der lustige Astronaut" [The merry astronaut]
  - "Las Vegas"

== The DVD ==
Unplugged – Rock'n'Roll Realschule

Video by Die Ärzte
- Released: 6 December 2002
- Recorded: 31 August 2002
- Genre: Punk rock
- Label: Hot Action Records
- Producer: Die Ärzte

Die Ärzte chronology
Killer (1999/2000)	Unplugged – Rock'n'Roll Realschule (2002)	Vollkommen gefangen im Schattenreich von Die Ärzte (2003)

Die Ärzte albums video chronology
Unplugged - Rock'n'Roll Realschule (2002)	Unplugged - Rock'n'Roll Realschule DVD (2002)	Geräusch (2003)

Unplugged – Rock'n'Roll Realschule is the first concert DVD and the second DVD by Die Ärzte. The video is based on the concert from 31 August 2002 to the CD from Rock'n'Roll Realschule. On the DVD are nine added tracks, six specials and one hidden track: "Dauerwelle vs. Minipli".

=== Track listing ===
1. "Tittenmaus" [Tit mouse]
2. "Sommer, Palmen, Sonnenschein" [Summer, palms, sunshine]
3. "Hurra" [Hooray]
4. "Blumen" [Flowers]
5. "Langweilig" [Boring]
6. "Meine Ex(plodierte Freundin)" [My ex(ploded girlfriend)]
7. "Monsterparty"
8. "Kopfhaut" [Headskin]
9. "Ist das alles?" [Is that all?]
10. "Schrei nach Liebe" [Cry for love]
11. "Zu spät" [Too late]
12. "Westerland"
13. "1/2 Lovesong"
14. "Komm zurück" [Come back]
15. "Komm zurück" (video)
16. "Der Graf" [The Count]
17. "Lieber Tee" [Rather have tea]
18. "Ignorama"
19. "Is ja irre" [That's crazy]
20. "Bitte, bitte" [Please, please]
21. "Mit dem Schwert nach Polen, warum René?" [With a sword to Poland, why René?]
22. "3-Tage-Bart" [Stubble, lit. 3-days-beard]
23. "Die Banane" [The banana]
24. "Die Banane" (video)
25. "Manchmal haben Frauen..." [Sometimes, women have...]
26. "Medley"
  - "Ohne dich" [Without you]
  - "Paul"
  - "Quark" [Rubbish; lit: Curd]
  - "Schunder-Song"
  - "Meine Freunde" [My friends]
  - "Nie wieder Krieg, nie mehr Las Vegas!" [No more war, no more Las Vegas!]
  - "Rettet die Wale" [Save the whales]
  - "Der lustige Astronaut" [The funny astronaut]
  - "Las Vegas"
27. "Gute Nacht" [Good night]

=== Specials ===
1. "Westerland" (rehearsal)
2. "Der Graf" (rehearsal)
3. "3-Tage-Bart" (rehearsal)
4. "Mit dem Schwert nach Polen, warum René?" (rehearsal)
5. "Schweres Schwert" [difficult sword]
6. "Umbaupause" [scene-changing interval]
7. "Dauerwelle vs. Minipli" (Plugged)

All of the above are only found as easter eggs on the DVD has a mock-disclaimer stating: "Ach ja... für alle DVD-Geschädigten: Es gibt keinen Hidden-Track... ehrlich." (Oh, by the way for all those who are 'damaged' by DVDs: There is no hidden track... seriously.)

== Song information ==
=== DVD ===
- Track 7 is previously unreleased
- Track 2, 8 is from the EP Uns geht's prima...
- Track 11 is from the album Debil
- Track 9 is from the album Die Ärzte
- Track 4, 12, 20 is from the album Das ist nicht die ganze Wahrheit...
- Track 1 is from the compilation album Die Ärzte früher!
- Track 27 is from the single Teenager Liebe (unecht)/Gute Nacht
- Track 10, 17, 18, 21 is from the album Die Bestie in Menschengestalt
- Track 19 is from the single "Ein Song namens Schunder"
- Track 3, 5, 6, 14, 23 is from the album Planet Punk
- Track 22 is from the album Le Frisur
- Track 13, 16 is from the album 13
- Track 25 is from the album Runter mit den Spendierhosen, Unsichtbarer!

== Singles ==
2002: "Komm zurück/Die Banane"

== Personnel ==
- Farin Urlaub – guitar, bass guitar, banjo, harmonica, vocals
- Bela Felsenheimer – drums, washboard, vocals
- Rodrigo González – bass guitar, twelve stringed guitar, vocals
- Markus Paßlick – percussion

== Charts ==
=== Weekly charts ===
Chart (2002)	Peak position
Austrian Albums (Ö3 Austria)	5
German Albums (Offizielle Top 100)	2
Swiss Albums (Schweizer Hitparade)	20

=== Year-end charts ===
Chart (2002)	Position
German Albums (Offizielle Top 100)	51
Chart (2003)	Position
German Albums (Offizielle Top 100)	46
