= Botho-Lucas-Chor =

The Botho-Lucas-Chor was one of the most famous German vocal ensembles of the 1960s and 1970s.

== The choir ==
In 1958, Botho Lucas (1923–2012) founded the Lucas Quartet (Botho Lucas, Bernd Golonsky, Günter Kallmann, Ralf Paulsen), from which the Botho-Lucas-Chor emerged in 1961 with changing female casts - Kästel, Ans Plevier, Daisy Door, Ulla Wiesner, Hanna Dölitsch), first as a studio ensemble with well-known performers but soon with its own, solo works.

Danke, the song with which Martin Gotthard Schneider won the competition for new spiritual songs from the Evangelische Akademie Tutzing, became the first unexpected success for the Botho-Lucas Chor. The song became an evergreen and is still heard in numerous concerts. In the following year, the choir produced two LPs with further modern, spiritual titles, some of which, like Ein Schiff, das sich Gemeinde nennt, turned very popular.

The choir repertoire and interpretations can be described as extraordinarily versatile. It included modern folk tunes, operettas, musicals, hit covers, schlagers in several languages such as the adaptation in German of the title song of the British film Those Magnificent Men in their Flying Machines (Richt’ge Männer wie wir) released in 1965.

On television, the choir was represented in many programs, soloistically and with accompaniment. In addition, choral and solo productions took place with almost all orchestras from the world of radio and television, and the ensemble also played a part in numerous productions of prominent artists of the 1960s as an accompanying choir, among others Wir können uns nur Briefe schreiben by Greetje Kauffeld (1964) and Santo Domingo by Wanda Jackson (1965).

Beside Ralf Paulsen, Daisy Door was one of the well-known soloists who helped the choir achieve its distinctive sound. Daisy Door was famous for the title Du lebst in deiner Welt (You're living in your world) from the television series Der Kommissar. In 1979, the Botho-Lucas Chor went on tour with Bert Kaempfert's orchestra through Germany, Luxembourg and Switzerland, and also performed in the Royal Albert Hall in London.

== Discography ==
=== Vinyl singles ===
EMI Group (year, title, catalog nbr.):

- 1961: Valencia / Barcelona – C* 21771
- 1961: Berliner Polka / Tango Continental – C 21941
- 1962: Förster Toni / Die Züricher Mädels – C 21998
- 1962: Afrika-Song / Sahara-Blues – C 22066
- 1962: Danke / Antwort auf alle Fragen – E 22073
- 1962: Die Regenmelodie / Stadtpark-Serenade – C 22020
- 1963: Prinzessin-Serenade / Sweet Clarinet – E 22318
- 1963: Ich weiß basaltene Bergeshöh'n / Rhönmarsch – O 22492
- 1963: 55 Tage in Peking / Weht der Wind von Westen – E 22494
- 1963: Ich zieh' meiner dunklen Straße / Funde am Weg – E 22534
- 1963: Ein Schiff, das sich Gemeinde nennt / Gott ist der Herr – E 22539
- 1964: Als die Sonne kam / Nur du – E 23302
- 1964: Liebeskummer lohnt sich nicht / Junger Mann mit roten Rosen – E 22759
- 1965: Topsy / Damals in Jenny's Bar – E 22860
- 1965: Wir wandern auf vielen Straßen / Abendglocken – E 22890
- 1965: Richt’ge Männer wie wir / Wo sind denn hier die schönen Mädchen – E 23022
- 1965: Uns're kleine feine Familie / Ja die kleinen weißen Mäuse – E 23082
- 1966: Barkarole der Liebe / Liebe und Liebelei – E 23131
- 1966: Als die Sonne kam / Nur du – E 23302
- 1967: Lehr mich / Diesen Tag, Herr – E 23580
- 1970: Rose vom Rhein / Blumen, Blüten, Bäume – C 29836
- 1973: Die Nacht ist sowieso im Eimer / Heute Nacht, da könnt’ ich mich verschenken – C 30493
- 1974: Du wirst nie einsam sein / Liebe im Mai – C 30538

---
* C: Columbia, E: Electrola, O: Odeon

=== Vinyl longplayings ===
(year, title, label)

- 1961: Sei lieb zu mir – Electrola 74153
- 1962: Danke – Crystal 32792
- 1963: Die Landsknechtstrommel – Odeon 77
- 1964: Küss mich - Musik zum Träumen und Tanzen – Hörzu / Electrola
- 1973: Highway of Songs – Columbia 29465
- 1978: Liebst du mich – Electrola 32825
- ?: Operette zum mitsingen – Columbia 23946
- ?: Operette á gogo – mfp 5441
- ?: Küss mich, bitte, bitte küss mich – mfp 5578
- ?: Sei lieb zu mir – Electrola

== Bibliography ==
- Ingo Grabowsky, Martin Lücke: Die 100 Schlager des Jahrhunderts. Europäische Verlagsanstalt, Hamburg 2008, ISBN 3-434-50619-5, pp. 174–176 und passim.
