= Backpfeifengesicht =

Backpfeifengesicht may refer to:

- "Backpfeifengesicht", a song by Die Ärtze from the album Bäst of
- "Backpfeifengesicht", a song by Animals as Leaders from the album The Madness of Many
