= Komm zurück =

Komm zurück translates to "Come back" in German. It may refer to:

- Come Back (film), a 1953 West German film
- "J'attendrai", a 1938 French song recorded in German as "Komm zurück"
- "Komm zurück/Die Banane", songs by German rock band Die Ärzte
