= Johannes von Busse =

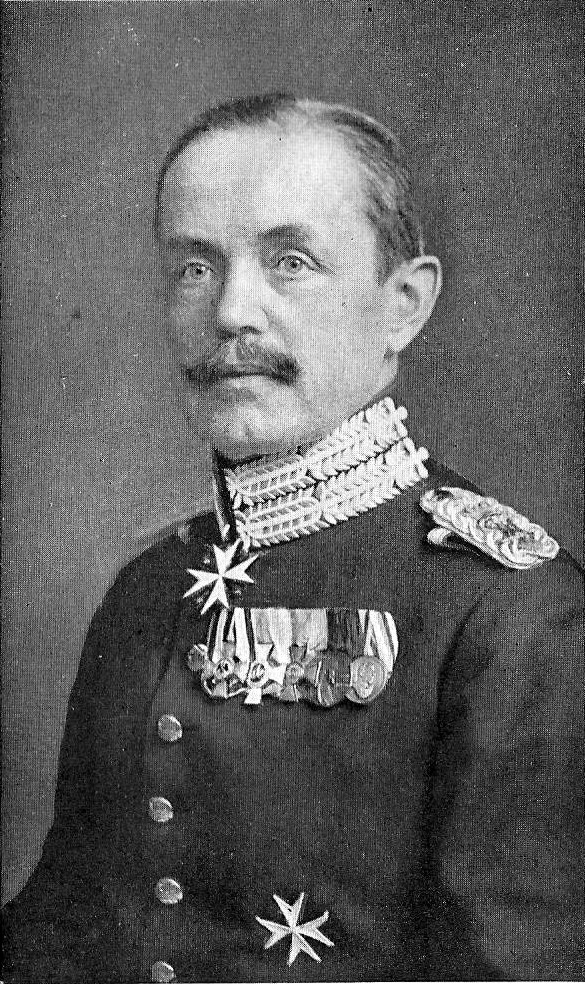
- Born: April 20, 1862; Neisse, Province of Silesia, Prussia
- Died: October 31, 1936 (aged 74); Erfurt, Gau Thuringia, Germany
- Military career
- Allegiance: German Empire
- Branch: Imperial German Army
- Service years: 1879–1919
- Rank: Generalleutnant
- Commands: 111th Infantry Division
- Conflicts: World War I: First Battle of the Aisne; Third Battle of Petrozsény; Battle of Arras (1917); German spring offensive

Johannes von Busse (1862 – 1936) was a German lieutenant general who was most notable for his service in the Romanian Campaign of World War I.

== Biography ==
=== Origin ===
Johannes comes from the Busse family who was raised to the hereditary Prussian nobility on April 21, 1859. He was a son of the Prussian district judge Rudolf von Busse (1823-1862) and his wife Magarethe, born von dem Borne (Born in 1834).

=== Military career ===
Busse served in the military after his education in the cadet corps. On 12 April 1879 he was made an ensign in the 2nd (1st Pomeranian) Grenadier Regiment of the Prussian Army in Szczecin; and was promoted to second lieutenant on November 13, 1879. As such he was, from January 28, 1886, adjutant of its II. Battalion. Busse became a Prime Lieutenant on September 19, 1888, and from October 1, 1888, to July 21, 1891, received further training at the Prussian Staff College. Following this, Busse performed troop service again in his old regiment. From April 1, 1892, to September 13, 1893, he was assigned to the Great General Staff and simultaneous named captain and company commander. Busse held the later position for almost four years. Then he was transferred back to Stettin to serve for a year in the 148th (5th West Prussian) Infantry Regiment and on April 30, 1898, came to the Hauptkadettenanstalt as a teacher. When he was promoted to major on January 27, 1903, he was attached to the 84th (Schleswig) Infantry Regiment. From November 15, 1904, to November 18, 1908, Busse was in Königsberg, acting as the commander of the 2nd Battalion of the 3rd (2nd East Prussian) Grenadier Regiment. He was then appointed commander of the Neisse Military School and promoted, on January 27, 1910, to Lieutenant Colonel; eveintually being promoted to Colonel on 13 September 1912. He took command of the 89th (Grand Ducal Mecklenburgian) Grenadier Regiment on November 19, 1912. In this position he was awarded the Commander's Cross of the Order of the White Elephant in January 1914.

With the outbreak of World War I, Busse was appointed commander of the 34th Reserve Infantry Brigade, part of the 18th Reserve Division. As such he participated in the march through neutral Belgium for the Invasion of France and fought at the First Battle of the Aisne. In this capacity he was awarded both classes of the Iron Cross. He gave up command at the end of October 1914 and took over the 102nd Reserve Infantry Brigade, which at that time was on the Yser Front. After Busse was, on March 22, 1915, promoted to Major General he was given command of the newly established 210th Infantry Brigade on November 20, 1915. With this he crossed the Danube at Semendria and formed the vanguard of the IV Reserve Corps on its advance through Serbia to the Greek border. In the period that followed, he stayed at Lake Dojran, where border fighting broke out. During the Brusilov Offensive in the summer of 1916, Busse then commanded the infantry of Wilhelmi's division and was able to stop the advance of the Russian armed forces in his sector. Thereupon he became, on September 22, 1916, the leader of the 301st Division. This unit also included Austro-Hungarian troops and was led by von Busse during the campaign against Romania. For his work he was awarded the Order of the Red Eagle, 2nd Class with Oak Leaves and Swords, in December 1916.

In mid-January 1917, Busse was withdrawn from the Eastern Front and appointed in command of the Upper Rhine fortifications in Baden. On April 21, 1917, he was appointed commander of the 111th Infantry Division fighting against British units near Arras. During the subsequent fighting in Flanders his division suffered heavy losses and was withdrawn from the front on August 1. After being refreshed it was used again from October 17 to November 6. After fighting in the Siegfried Line, he prepared his division for the German spring offensive. As an attack division, it played a major role in the breakthrough battles, and on April 16, 1918, Busse received the highest Prussian valor award, the order Pour le Mérite, for his achievements. After the failure of the German offensive, the division returned to trench warfare, fighting at Monchy-Bapaume at the beginning of September and at Valenciennes at the end of October. Then he retreated to the Antwerp-Maas position.

After the armistice Busse led his division back home where it was demobilized and disbanded by January 191. On January 20, 1919, he was appointed commander of the 17th Division. In the course of the dissolution of the Prussian Army, Busse was put up for disposal on September 30, 1919, and given the character of lieutenant general and retired.

In 1921 Busse was elected chairman of the German War Graves Commission, state association in Mecklenburg-Schwerin in Schwerin.

He was a legal knight of the Order of St. John and Commander of the Second Class of the Order of Dannebrog.

=== Family ===
Busse married Maria von Holtzendorff (1872–1908) in Berlin on October 12, 1892. Their children, Evamaria (* 1897), Gisela (1899–1987) and Hans (* 1903) emerged from the marriage. A distant relative was the architect Hans-Busso von Busse.

== Bibliography ==
- Karl-Friedrich Hildebrand, Christian Zweng: "The Knights of the Order Pour le Mérite of World War I." Volume 1: "A – G." Biblio Verlag, Osnabrück 1999, ISBN 3-7648-2505-7, pp. 242–243.
- Hanns Möller: “History of the Knights of the Order pour le mérite in World War I.” Volume I: “A – L.” Verlag Bernard & Graefe, Berlin 1935, pp. 180–182.
- Gothaisches Genealogisches Taschenbuch der Briefadeligen houses. 1913. Seventh year, Justus Perthes, Gotha 1912, p. 181.
