= Elke (song) =

1999 single by Die Ärzte

Song by Die Ärzte

from the album Das ist nicht die ganze Wahrheit...
- Released: 1988
- Genre: Punk rock
- Length: 3:22
- Label: CBS Schallplatten
- Songwriter: Farin Urlaub
- Producers: Uwe Hoffmann & Die Ärzte

"Die Schönen und das Biest: Elke (live)"

Single by Die Ärzte

from the album Wir wollen nur deine Seele
- Released: 8 November 1999
- Recorded: 18 May 1997
- Genre: Punk rock
- Length: 3:36
- Label: Hot Action Records
- Songwriter: Farin Urlaub
- Producers: Uwe Hoffmann & Die Ärzte

Die Ärzte singles chronology
| "Rebell" (1999) | "Die Schönen und das Biest: Elke (live)" (1999) | "Wie es geht" (2000) |

"Elke" is a punk song by German band Die Ärzte. It's the seventh track from their 1988 album Das ist nicht die ganze Wahrheit... The song's lyrics were inspired by an overweight fan and depict a fictitious love story between Urlaub and the eponymous fan.

The music is unique, as the first verse is sung slowly and then the song goes to the chorus very abruptly and then progresses with fast singing. This makes it a live favourite, as witnessed by the inclusion of 1988 live version to Das Beste von kurz nach früher bis jetze and the single of 1999.

It's also the twenty-second track on CD2 from their 1999 live album Wir wollen nur deine Seele. "Die Schönen und das Biest" (The Beauties and the Beast) is the title of the single that was released to promote the album. The single is not the one featured on the album, which is much longer. The single version is from a concert at Rock am Ring (18 May 1997).

== Music video "Die Schönen und das Biest" ==
The video is animated and shows the band performing live, while a gigantic and monstrous girl-fan "attacks" band members with air kisses and such. They fight back until she hits the floor. It turns out that she is still alive and is outraged. The monstrous fan is finally killed with a tank.

== Track listing ==
1. "Elke (live)" - 3:36
2. "Medley (live)" - 13:31 (CD) / 9:52 (vinyl)
  - "Teenager Liebe" [Teenager love]
  - "2000 Mädchen" [2,000 girls]
  - "Außerirdische" [Aliens]
  - "Claudia hat 'nen Schäferhund" [Claudia has a German Shepherd]
  - "Ohne dich" [Without you]
  - "Du willst mich küssen" [You want to kiss me]
  - "3-Tage-Bart" [Stubble]
  - "Roter Minirock" [Red miniskirt]
  - "Grace Kelly"
  - "Bonnie & Clyde" (Die Toten Hosen cover)
  - "Radio brennt" [Radio burns]
  - "Frank'n'stein"
  - "Anneliese Schmidt"
  - "El Cattivo" [Bad (in Italian)]
  - "Erna P."
  - "Die Banane" [The banana]
  - "Westerland"
3. "Elke (Video)" - 4:02

== B-sides ==
"Medley" is from a concert in Mannheim (12 October 1998)

== Personnel ==
=== Das ist nicht die ganze Wahrheit... ===
- Farin Urlaub - vocals, guitar, bass
- Bela B. - drums, guitar solo

=== Wir wollen nur deine Seele ===
- Farin Urlaub - vocals, guitar
- Rodrigo González - bass
- Bela B. - drums

== Charts ==
| Year | Country | Position |
|---|---|---|
| 1999 | Germany | 28 |
