= Daisy Door =

German Schlager music singer

Daisy Door (born 30 January 1944 in Duisburg, real name Evelyn van Ophuisen) is a German Schlager music singer.

== Biography ==
As a child, Daisy Door sang on Radio Cologne. Her first recordings were performed with her sister Liane as "Li & Ev (e)"; A solo single was also issued. Later she was a member of the Botho-Lucas-Chor.

In 1971 she became famous as solo singer with the song Du lebst in deiner Welt (Highlights of My Dreams) composed and produced by Peter Thomas then with Als die Blumen Trauer trugen of the TV program Der Kommissar where she lent her voice to the unnamed actress Sylvia Lukan. More than 500,000 copies of this title were sold within three months.

Daisy Door chose her pseudonym with reference to Doris Day. Her current name is Evelyn Ericson and she lives in Duisburg.

== Singles ==
=== as Li & Eve ===
- 1963: Bye-Bye, Birdie, EMI Electrola E 22 640
- 1964: Bestell ein Taxi, EMI Electrola 22 747
- 1965: Oh, Mama Mia Mutti, EMI Electrola E 23 036
- 1965: Darling, Don’t Go, EMI Electrola E 23 097

=== as Eve ===
- 1965: Du bist für mich wie der Sonnenschein, EMI Electrola E 23 117

=== as Li & Ev ===
- 1966: Ben Sidih braucht Soldaten, EMI Electrola E 23 217
- 1966: Dann kam die Liebe, EMI Electrola E 23 368

=== as Daisy Door ===
- 1967: Curry, EMI Electrola E 23 461
- 1968: Mein Herz hat geschlossen, Vogue DV 14699
- 1969: Im Mondschein ist alles anders, Vogue DV 84989
- 1970: Mister Happiness, Vogue DV 11075
- 1971: Schulmädchen, Ariola 10 337 AT (Titel aus „Der neue Schulmädchen-Report, 2. Teil“)
- 1971: Du lebst in deiner Welt, Ariola 10 843 AT
- 1971: Pop Corn
- 1972: Komm und wir sind frei, Ariola 12 039 AT
- 1972: The Bigger Step You Take, Ariola 12 210 XT
- 1972: Liebe fragt nicht nach Millionen, Ariola 12313 AT
- 1973: Straße der Vergangenheit, Ariola 12 711 AT
- 1973: Mein Paradies im Sonnenschein, Ariola 13 306 AT
- 1974: Komm in mein Haus, Telefunken 6.12181
- 1975: Im Wald da sind die Räuber, Ariola 16160
- 1977: Komm in mein Haus (Pazza Idea), Telefunken 6.12181 AC
- 1979: Du Lebst In Deiner Welt (Highlights Of My Dream), Ariola – 100 509 - 100
