= Unrockbar =

Single by Die Ärzte

from the album Geräusch
- Released: 15 September 2003
- Genre: Punk rock
- Length: 3:47; 4:01 (album version)
- Label: Hot Action Records
- Songwriter(s): Farin Urlaub
- Producer(s): Uwe Hoffmann & Die Ärzte

Die Ärzte singles chronology
"Unplugged – Komm zurück/Die Banane" (2002)	"Unrockbar" (2003)	"Dinge von denen" (2003)

"Unrockbar" is a punk song by German band Die Ärzte. It's the first track on CD2 and the first single from their 2003 album Geräusch. The title is a self-derived German word, which can be translated as "unrockable", "unable to rock", or "unable to be rocked". The lyrics tell the story of a man who, to his shock and dismay, realizes that his girlfriend dislikes rock music.

References are made to Ricky Martin, Shakira as "unrockbar" and Beatsteaks as "rockbar" (in the song nothing is actually dubbed "rockbar" and "unrockbar", but are mentioned in corresponding contexts).

== Music video ==
The music video was released on the "Dinge von denen" CD single as well as the Overkiller DVD. The video uses the album version (longer) of the song. There is also a split-screen version of the video showing the storyboard, released on the Overkiller DVD and for free on the official website.

In the video, a bunch of people are participating a self-help seminar in rock. The actors include all three band members.

In the first scene, Jens (played by Farin Urlaub) is shown walking across a large hall, humming. He stops to read a list of signs that show the room numbers of daytime classes. The classes on the signs are references to other songs on Geräusch. The signs read

- "NichtWissen - Raum 09"
- "Deine Schuld - Raum 13"
- "Anti-Zombie" with the room number not visible
- "Bin ich ein Mann? - Raum 18" [am I a man?] referring to the Song "Ein Mann" [a man]
- "Rock-Selbsthilfe - Raum 77" [rock self-help]

Jens then continues his way through another hall, where a Foucault pendulum is swinging from the ceiling. He walks past an open door where he watches a couple fight with soft foam bars and proceeds through the door of the rock self-help class. Only as he enters the room the song begins to play. All the other participants are already there, and Horst (played by Rodrigo González) looks at his wrist watch, shaking his head, while the very handsome teacher smiles at Jens. The teacher starts the classes by playing music from an LP. The group comments this with shocked looks and one man (played by Bela B.) breaks down on the floor, with a fit of coughing. The teacher begs Jens to help him, starting an apparent romance between Jens and the teacher.

At the end of the class, the group finds itself in the middle of the audience of a Die Ärzte-concert, but they can't stand it and get out of the hall while Die Ärzte are singing "Baby sieh es nicht so eng, fang jetzt endlich an zu bangen, dann hast du auch bald kapiert, dass der Rock die Welt regiert!" [Baby don't be so narrow-minded, finally start banging and soon you'll see that rock rules the world!]. The run out of the building only to find a whole army of Belas, Farins, and Rods marching in a parade and singing along the last line "rock rules the world".

The last scene shows Jens sitting in a plain room holding a small hammer, knocking the beat to the last notes of the song on three small stones on a table in front of him, grinning stupidly. It looks as if he's gone mad.

== Track listing ==
1. "Unrockbar (Single-Edit)" - 3:47
2. "Kontovollmacht..." - 4:39
3. "Aus dem Tagebuch eines Amokläufers" - 2:37
4. "Dolannes Melodie (live)" - 7:42

== B-sides ==
- "Kontovollmacht..." ("Account authorization") is a sarcastic song about feeling sorry for a man with no luck, although his life is still a lot better than many others'.
- "Aus dem Tagebuch eines Amokläufers" ("From the diary of an amok-runner") discusses recent changes in Germany.
- "Dolannes Melodie" is a tribute to Gheorghe Zamfir; it's not on the vinyl. It is part of a live performance recorded on 15 March 2003 at the last concert of the "Nackt unter Kannibalen"-tour [naked amongst cannibals] in Rottweil.

== Personnel ==
- Farin Urlaub – vocals, guitar
- Bela B. – drums
- Rodrigo González – bass

== Charts ==
Year	Country	Position
2003	Germany	1
2003	Austria	9
2003	Switzerland	27
