= Martin Gotthard Schneider =

German composer and director of church music (1930–2017)

- Born: 26 April 1930; Konstanz, Germany
- Died: 3 February 2017 (aged 86)
- Occupations: Theologian; Church musician; State cantor; Songwriter; Academic teacher
- Organizations: Musikhochschule Freiburg

Martin Gotthard Schneider (26 April 1930 – 3 February 2017) was a German theologian, church musician, Landeskantor (state cantor), songwriter, and academic teacher. He is known for prize-winning songs of the genre Neues Geistliches Lied, such as "Danke" and "Ein Schiff, das sich Gemeinde nennt".

== Career ==
Born in Konstanz, Schneider studied Protestant theology and church music in Heidelberg, Tübingen and Basel. From 1958 he worked in Freiburg im Breisgau, first as a vicar at the Ludwigskirche, and from 1960 to 1970 as teacher of religion at the Kepler Gymnasium. During these years he began to build a wide-ranging church music work. He temporarily was a part-time church musician at two churches, the Christuskirche and the Pauluskirche, and became Bezirkskantor (regional cantor) in the church district of Freiburg.

In 1958, he won a prize for organ improvisation at the International Improvisation Competition (Haarlem). In 1961, he founded the concert choir Heinrich-Schütz-Kantorei. In 1970, Schneider was appointed Kirchenmusikdirektor (church music director). From 1970 to 1995, he held the position of church musician at the Ludwigskirche and the Pauluskirche, and from 1975 to 1995 the office of Landeskantor for Southern Baden. From 1963 to 1997, he lectured at the Musikhochschule Freiburg, appointed professor in 1980.

== Work ==
Schneider's compositional work is oriented towards the practice of church music and includes choral and organ music. Above all, Schneider has emerged as an author of the genre Neues Geistliches Lied. His hymn "Danke" earned him the first prize in the song competition of the Evangelische Akademie Tutzing in 1961. In 1963, it reached the German charts (Hitparade) and stayed for six weeks. It was the only sacred song to make the charts, and it was translated into 25 languages. "Ein Schiff, das sich Gemeinde nennt" (second prize in 1963) is also well known. Schneider's songbook Sieben Leben möcht ich haben appeared in 1975. Organ improvisations and choral music with Schneider are available on CDs. The Protestant hymnal Evangelisches Gesangbuch (EG) includes six of his hymns, including "Danke" as EG 334.
