= 13 (Die Ärzte album) =

Studio album by Die Ärzte
- Released: 25 May 1998
- Genre: Punk rock, alternative rock
- Length: 62:27
- Label: Hot Action, PolyGram (distribution)
- Producer: Uwe Hoffmann & Die Ärzte

Die Ärzte chronology
Le Frisur (1996)	13 (1998)	Wir wollen nur deine Seele (1999)

Singles from 13
- 1. "Ein Schwein namens Männer" Released: 6 April 1998; 2. "Goldenes Handwerk" Released: 30 August 1998; 3. "1/2 Lovesong" Released: 10 November 1998; 4. "Rebell" Released: 4 June 1999

Professional ratings
Review scores
Source	Rating
laut.de	4/5 stars

13 is the eighth studio album by German rock band Die Ärzte, released on 25 May 1998. It is their most successful album, going platinum in Germany and gold in Austria and Switzerland. The 13th track, "Männer sind Schweine", is their most successful single.

The CD version of the album features a hidden track in the pregap of the first song. This technique was later used frequently—on Geräusch, Jazz ist anders, Farin Urlaub's Am Ende der Sonne, and Bela B.'s Bingo. On vinyl versions of Jazz ist anders and Am Ende der Sonne though, the hidden tracks are not lost, but put after the last track.

The album features many film and TV samples. Samples are used on tracks 1, 4, 5, 8, 10, 12, 13, 16, and on the hidden track.

== Track listing ==
No.	Title	Lyrics	Music	Length
1.	"Punk ist..." ("Punk is...")	Felsenheimer	Felsenheimer	3:42
2.	"Ein Lied für dich" ("A song for you")	Urlaub	Urlaub	2:43
3.	"Goldenes Handwerk" ("Golden handicraft")	Felsenheimer	Felsenheimer	3:34
4.	"Meine Freunde" ("My friends")	Urlaub	Urlaub	1:47
5.	"Party stinkt" ("Party stinks")	Felsenheimer	Felsenheimer	3:26
6.	"1/2 Lovesong"	Felsenheimer, González	González	3:52
7.	"Ignorama" (contains a prelude to "Nie wieder Krieg, nie mehr Las Vegas!")	Felsenheimer	Felsenheimer, González	2:46
8.	"Nie wieder Krieg, nie mehr Las Vegas!" ("No more war, no more Las Vegas!")	Urlaub	Urlaub	2:36
9.	"Rebell" ("Rebel")	Urlaub	Urlaub	3:51
10.	"Der Graf" ("The Count")	Felsenheimer	Felsenheimer	3:44
11.	"Grau" ("Gray")	Urlaub	Urlaub	2:45
12.	"Angeber" ("Show-off"; contains a prelude to "Männer sind Schweine")	Urlaub	Urlaub	2:58
13.	"Männer sind Schweine" ("Men are pigs")	Urlaub	Urlaub	4:17
14.	"Liebe und Schmerz" ("Love and sorrow")	Felsenheimer	Felsenheimer	3:52
15.	"Nie gesagt" ("Never said")	Urlaub	Urlaub	4:57
16.	"Der Infant" ("The infant")	Felsenheimer	Felsenheimer	3:05
17.	"Grotesksong" (roughly "Grotesque song")	Urlaub	Urlaub	3:40

=== Hidden track ===
The song "Lady" is hidden in the pregap of "Punk ist...". It was composed by González with lyrics by González and Felsenheimer. To hear it, one has to rewind the record from the first track to -3:55.

== Personnel ==
- Farin Urlaub – guitar, vocals
- Bela Felsenheimer – drums, vocals
- Rodrigo González – bass guitar, guitar, vocals

== Charts ==
Country	Chart position
Germany	1
Austria	2
Switzerland	1

=== Year-end charts ===
Chart (1998)	Position
German Albums Chart	10
