= Udo Hahn =

Udo Hahn (born 9 May 1962, Lauf an der Pegnitz) is a German Evangelical Lutheran theologian, pastor and publicist.
