= Die klügsten Männer der Welt =

Single by Die Ärzte

from the album Geräusch
- Released: 22 November 2004
- Genre: Punk rock, country rock
- Length: 3:37
- Label: Hot Action Records
- Songwriter(s): Dirk Felsenheimer
- Producer(s): Uwe Hoffmann & Die Ärzte

Die Ärzte singles chronology
"Deine Schuld" (2004)	"Die klügsten Männer der Welt" (2004)	"Junge" (2007)

"Die klügsten Männer der Welt" (often shortened as "DKMDW") [The wisest men in the world] is a song by German rock band Die Ärzte. It's the seventh track on CD2 and the fifth single from their 2003 album Geräusch. It's a sarcastic ode to politicians. The CD single features a computer game "Päcman" and also the video.

== The video ==
Bela B. plays a simple-minded hillbilly, drinking whisky and singing along with his television while it shows Die Ärzte playing the song live. He is also shown doing other mostly absurd things in the country. Later he plays with a toy-tank, destroying toy landmarks of major towns and sends a toy-rocket to the sky. In the end he is riding towards a mushroom cloud. After that the words "...regardless: not voting helps the wrong ones" can be read on the screen, and a swastika is knocked into a trash can. Throughout, the song's lyrics appear on screen with the heads of prominent German and international politicians appearing as the bouncing ball.

== Track listing ==
1. "Die klügsten Männer der Welt" – 4:00
2. "Sprüche III" – 17:22
3. "Die klügsten Männer der Welt" (video) – 4:14
4. "Päcman" (enhanced CD-R track)

=== Vinyl ===
1. "Die klügsten Männer der Welt" – 4:00
2. "Sprüche IIIa" – 6:50
3. "Sprüche IIIb" – 10:37

== B-sides ==
"Sprüche III" (Patter III) is from the Unrockstar tour. On the vinyl, it is divided into two parts; a on the A-side, b on the B-side.

== Personnel ==
- Bela B. – vocals, drums
- Farin Urlaub – guitar
- Rodrigo González – bass

== Charts ==
Year	Country	Position
2004	Germany	23
2004	Austria	33
2004	Switzerland	50
