= Mein Baby war beim Frisör =

Single by Die Ärzte

from the album Le Frisur
- Released: 30 August 1996
- Genre: Pop punk
- Length: 2:16
- Label: Metronome Musik GmbH
- Songwriter(s): Farin Urlaub
- Producer(s): Uwe Hoffmann & Die Ärzte

Die Ärzte singles chronology
"3-Tage-Bart" (1996)	"Mein Baby war beim Frisör" (1996)	"'Rockgiganten vs. Strassenköter'" (1996)

"Mein Baby war beim Frisör" (My baby's been to the hairdresser's) is a punk song by Die Ärzte. It's the second track and the second single from their 1996 album Le Frisur. The song is musically and by title a reference to the song The KKK Took My Baby Away from the US punk rock band The Ramones.

== Personnel ==
- Farin Urlaub - vocals, guitar
- Rodrigo González – bass
- Bela B. - drums

== Track listing ==
1. "Mein Baby war beim Frisör" (Urlaub) - 2:16
2. "Zusamm'fassung (extended 1-13)" (Gonzalez, Felsenheimer, Urlaub) - 14:38

== B-sides ==
"Zusamm'fassung" actually consists of 13 different tracks. On the first press from the CD and the 10" maxi single, they're all on one track; on the second press from the CD, they are separate, although the back cover lists them as one track ("Zusamm'fassung (Extended 1-13)"). "Zusammenfassung" (Summary), the track of the origin of these short tracks, is found on "Le Frisur".

== Charts ==
Year	Country	Position
1996	Germany	43
