= Danke (song) =

"Danke" "Danke für diesen guten Morgen"
- Christian hymn by M. G. Schneider
- Written: 1961
- Text: by Martin Gotthard Schneider
- Language: German
- Published: 1962

"Danke" is a German Christian hymn written by Martin Gotthard Schneider in 1961. It was one of the first songs in the genre later called Neues Geistliches Lied (new spiritual song). The song title was disambiguated to its first line, "Danke für diesen guten Morgen" (Thanks for this good morning). The song has been included in the hymnal Evangelisches Gesangbuch. It has been called the best-known German sacred song.

== History ==
Lyrics and music of the song were written by Martin Gotthard Schneider for a competition of the Evangelische Akademie Tutzing for new sacred songs, requesting melodies in the style of jazz or pop. The song won the first prize. It was first produced in an arrangement by Werner Last with a single female singer of the Botho-Lucas-Chor in playback, but labelled the choir on the cover. Ralf Bendix performed the song in 1963 on the Kirchentag in Dortmund for an audience of 16,000. The song then made it to the charts and stayed for six weeks. Danke was published by the Gustav Bosse Verlag in 1962 who reprinted it along with nine other chorale works as Bosses Beste (Bosse's Best) to celebrate its centenary in 2012.

== Theme ==
Danke is in six stanzas of four lines each, three of them beginning with "Danke", continued by specific things for which to be grateful. Towards the end is the addressee of the thanks named as "mein Herr" ("my Lord"), thanked then for the ability to say thanks. The listing of the varied items for which to be grateful is rhetorically an "enumeratio“, showing at the same time a catalogue of things, and the virtuosity of the author to assemble the catalogue.

== Reception ==
When first released, the song was met with protest, with some protesters calling it "Negermusik" (negro music) and "Gotteslästerung" (blasphemy); a critic in the weekly Die Zeit wrote of two sins, "eine gegen die Musik und eine gegen die Religion!" (one against music and one against religion). Sales for the single rose to 700,000 by the late 1960s. The song has been translated into more than 25 languages. It has even been performed by groups and singers who are not affiliated with churches, such as Die Ärzte, Normahl and Mickie Krause. In 1964, Petula Clark recorded the English rendition Thank you, which was released as a single in the UK.

"Danke für diesen guten Morgen" has been included in the hymnal Evangelisches Gesangbuch as EG 334. "Danke" has been called the best-known German sacred song, according to Jörg Döring who analyzed its rhetoric.

== Literature ==
- Jörg Döring: "Danke für diesen guten Morgen" Zur Rhetorik von Katalog und "enumeratio" im neuen geistlichen Lied. In: Natalie Binczek, Remigius Bunia, Till Dembeck, Alexander Zons (ed.): Dank sagen. Politik, Semantik und Poetik der Verbindlichkeit. Fink, Munich 2013, ISBN 978-3-7705-5669-4, pp 141–155.
