= Hans-Busso von Busse =

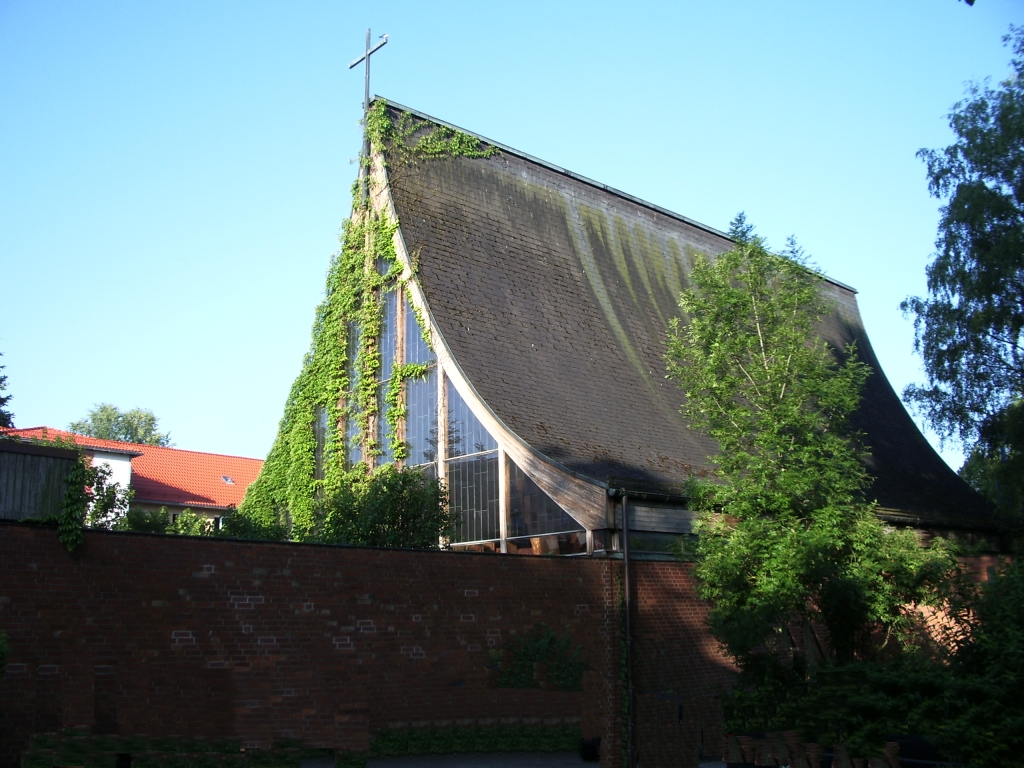
The Erlöserkirche in Erding, one of von Busse's designs.

Hans-Busso (Arthur Rudolf) von Busse (7 May 1930, Oppeln, Upper Silesia – 7 November 2009, Munich) was a German architect and academic.

He designed, among others, the Erlöserkirche in Erding and a restaurant at the Evangelische Akademie Tutzing.

== Selected buildings ==
- 1957: Residence Riedmayer on Starnberger See (with Hans Peter Buddeberg)
- 1961–1966: Heilig-Geist-Kirche in Waakirchen-Schaftlach
- 1962: Kongress Centre at the Rose Garden, Coburg
- 1963: Erlöserkirche, Erding
- 1969–1972: Gemeindeakademie of the Lutheran Church Franken in Schwarzenbruck-Rummelsberg
- 1970: Swimming hall in Rheine/Westfalen
- 1970–1972: Apartment house in München-Schwabing
- 1980: Restaurant for the Evangelische Akademie Tutzing
- 1987–1992: Passenger hall at the Munich airport
- 1990: Annex for the Munich Municipal Archive
- 1990: Gnadenkirche in Würzburg-Sanderau
- 1991: Berufsbildungswerk für Blinde und Sehbehinderte in Soest
- 1992: Veranstaltungszentrum Stadtschloß in Lichtenfels
- 1995: Cultural centre in Witten
- 1996: Chapel in Frenswegen Abbey
