= Dinge von denen =

Single by Die Ärzte

from the album Geräusch
- Released: 24 November 2003
- Genre: Alternative rock Psychedelic pop
- Length: 3:57
- Label: Hot Action Records
- Songwriters: Rodrigo Gonzalez; Donna Blitz
- Producers: Uwe Hoffmann & Die Ärzte

Die Ärzte singles chronology
"Unrockbar" (2003)	"Dinge von denen" (2003)	"Nichts in der Welt" (2004)

"Dinge von denen" (Things of which) is a song by German rock Die Ärzte. It is the fifth track on the first CD and the second single from their 2003 album Geräusch. It is about the singers dislike for hearing about other peoples ailments such as gross details that result from a medical condition, or complaints they have with other people.

== Music video ==
The music video is a parody of German 1960s music shows similar to Top of the Pops, including Beatclub. It is in black-and-white and was shot on a reconstructed set of the German game show Dalli, Dalli (Hurry, hurry). In reference to Dalli, Dalli host Hans Rosenthal the host in the music video uses Rosenthal's catchphrase at the end: "So, wir sind der Meinung, das war spitze" (Well, in our opinion it was great), Like Rosental the host then jumps into the air and the picture freezes. The introduction, after the intro and before the song, was a parody on the introduction for the 60's music show Beatclub, made by Wilhelm Wieben.

There are two versions of the video, Bela is not in the first one but in the second, where he is coming too late to the performance of the band.

== Track listing ==
1. "Dinge von denen" – 3:57
2. "Powerlove" – 4:37
3. "Worum es geht" – 2:51
4. "Unrockbar" (video) – 4:38
5. "Dinge von denen" (video) – 3:57

== B-sides ==
- "Powerlove" is about giving lonely women "powerloving", one of them attempting suicide and the other masturbating. It was initially released on the compilation album 10 Jahre Fritz – Die CD as "Power Love".
- "Worum es geht" (What it's about) is about different opinions of different social groups.

== Personnel ==
- Rodrigo González – vocals, keyboard, bass
- Farin Urlaub – guitar
- Bela B. – drums

== Charts ==
Year	Country	Position
2003	Germany	14
2003	Austria	33
2003	Switzerland	68
