= Nichts in der Welt =

Single by Die Ärzte

from the album Geräusch
- Released: 13 April 2004
- Genre: Alternative rock, Punk rock
- Length: 3:57
- Label: Hot Action Records
- Songwriter(s): Farin Urlaub
- Producer(s): Uwe Hoffmann & Die Ärzte

Die Ärzte singles chronology
"Dinge von denen" (2003)	"Nichts in der Welt" (2004)	"Deine Schuld" (2004)

"Nichts in der Welt" ("Nothing in the World") is a song by Die Ärzte. It is the sixth track on CD2 and the third single from their 2003 album Geräusch. It's about losing the belief in love.

== The video ==
The video shows the band performing the song live.

== Track listing ==
1. "Nichts in der Welt" (Urlaub) – 3:50
2. "Geld (live)" (Felsenheimer) – 4:46
3. "Anti-Zombie (live)" (Gonzalez/Gonzalez, Blitz) – 3:29
4. "WAMMW MESMAAG (live)" (Urlaub) – 3:53
5. "Nichts in der Welt (Video)" (Urlaub) – 3:50

== B-sides ==
- "Geld" ("Money") is from Runter mit den Spendierhosen, Unsichtbarer!
- "Anti-Zombie" and "WAMMW" are from Geräusch
- "WAMMW MESMAAG" has one verse more than "WAMMW". "WAMMW" is short for "Wenn alle Männer Mädchen wäre" [If all men were girls] and "MESMAAG" is short for "Mit einer Strophe mehr als auf "Geräusch" [With one more verse than on Geräusch].

== Personnel ==
- Farin Urlaub – vocals, guitar
- Rodrigo González – bass
- Bela B. – drums

== Charts ==
Year	Country	Position
2004	Germany	13
2004	Austria	29
2004	Switzerland	52
