= Mach die Augen zu =

Single by Die Ärzte

from the album Die Bestie in Menschengestalt
- Released: 15 November 1993
- Genre: Pop rock, Alternative rock
- Length: 4:00
- Label: Metronome Musik GmbH
- Songwriter: Farin Urlaub
- Producers: Uwe Hoffmann & Die Ärzte

Die Ärzte singles chronology
"Schrei nach Liebe" (1993)	"Mach die Augen zu" (1993)	"Friedenspanzer" (1994)

"Mach die Augen zu" [Close your eyes, lit. Close the eyes] is a punk song by Die Ärzte. It is the eighth track and the second single from their 1993 album Die Bestie in Menschengestalt. This song is about a relationship where one side wants to end the relationship and the other side desperately wants to keep pretending.

Translated excerpt:

Close your eyes and kiss me

I don't mind if you pretend

I forget what happened

And I hope and I dream

I wouldn't have lost you yet

== The video ==
The video is based on the fairy tale of Snow White. Shown is how the woman (whose appearance doesn't resemble Snow White's) bites a poisonous apple from a tree and then falls asleep. The dwarves carry her in a casket and a spider builds a web over her. Also is shown how a clumsy knight makes his way to the woman, finds her in the casket surrounded by dwarves, shreds the web and kisses the woman. The woman awakes, takes his helmet off and kisses him. She then proceeds to strip him from his armor. The video ends with the woman lifting the knight on the horse and walking beside it along the road.

== Track listing ==
1. "Mach die Augen zu" (Urlaub) - 4:00
2. "25 Stunden am Tag" (Witte) - 3:13

=== Maxi ===
1. "Mach die Augen zu" (Urlaub) - 4:00
2. "25 Stunden am Tag" (Witte) - 3:13
3. "Punkrockgirl" (Originalversion)" (Felsenheimer) - 1:53
4. "Wahre Liebe" (Gonzalez, Felsenheimer, Urlaub) - 3:03
5. "Mach die Augen zu" (Remix)" (Urlaub) - 4:30

== Personnel ==
- Farin Urlaub – vocals, acoustic guitar, electric guitar
- Bela B. – drums
- Rodrigo González – bass

== B-sides ==
- "25 Stunden am Tag" [25 hours per day] is a cover of Martin Witte/Witte XP.
- "Punkrockgirl" is the original version of the song "Deutschrockgirl" (from "Die Bestie in Menschengestalt").
- "Wahre Liebe" [True love] is the last song from Gabi & Uwe series.

"Wahre Liebe" and "Punkrockgirl" are also on "Bäst of".

== Charts ==
Chart (1993–1994)	Peak position
Austria (Ö3 Austria Top 40)	15
Germany (GfK)	31
