= Hurra (song) =

Single by Die Ärzte

from the album Planet Punk
- Released: 1995
- Genre: Punk rock
- Length: 3:26
- Label: Metronome Musik GmbH
- Songwriter: Farin Urlaub
- Producers: Uwe Hoffmann & Die Ärzte

Die Ärzte singles chronology
"Ein Song namens Schunder" (1995)	"Hurra" (1995)	"Rod ♥ You" (1995)

"Hurra" (in the booklet of the album, "Hurra!") is a song by the punk band Die Ärzte. It is the third track and the second single from their 1995 album Planet Punk. In the fadeout, a sample from the movie Clerks can be heard („That's beautiful, man.“). The song lyrics state that the situation in Germany after reunification is much better than before, which is meant sarcastically.

== The video ==
The video uses the single version of the song, which is slightly altered by some background voices and child's voice in the beginning and in the end. The video features the band performing the song in darkness; all band members are frowning, while the song sounds happy. This affirms that the song is meant sarcastically.

== Track listing ==
1. "Hurra" (Single-Version) (Urlaub) - 3:26
2. "Sex Me, Baby" (Gonzalez/Gonzalez, Felsenheimer) - 2:52
3. "Warrumska" (Urlaub) - 3:51
4. "Ekelpack" (Live-Version) (Felsenheimer, Urlaub, Exploited) - 7:04
5. "Eine Frage der Ehre" (Gonzalez) - 3:50

== B-sides ==
- "Sex Me, Baby" is mostly sung in German, but has some English language lines integrated to the bridge and refrain; it is about two persons with similar values and interests about to have sex.
- "Warrumska" [Warum → why] is about a man, who does not understand, why his girl left him, although he was abusive to her.
- "Ekelpack" [Disgust pack] is performed live in München in 27.10.1995.
- "Eine Frage der Ehre" [A question of honour] is a tour intro; it is not on the vinyl version of the single.

== Charts ==
Year	Country	Position
1995	Germany	25
1995	Switzerland	49
