= Deine Schuld =

Single by Die Ärzte

from the album Geräusch
- Released: 12 June 2004
- Genre: Punk rock
- Length: 3:37
- Label: Hot Action Records
- Songwriter: Farin Urlaub
- Producers: Uwe Hoffmann & Die Ärzte

Die Ärzte singles chronology
"Nichts in der Welt" (2004)	"Deine Schuld" (2004)	"Die klügsten Männer der Welt" (2004)

"Deine Schuld" (German: Your Fault) is a song by Die Ärzte. It is the second track on CD2 and the fourth single from their 2003 album Geräusch. It is a politically critical song about not doing anything to make the world better.

== The video ==
Band members are fishing. Near the end, the gravity shifts and everything flies up to a black cloud overhead.

== Track listing ==
1. "Deine Schuld" (Urlaub) - 3:37
2. "Biergourmet (unplugged)" (Die Ärzte/Felsenheimer) - 1:56
3. "N 48.3 (unplugged)" (Urlaub) - 2:58
4. "Frank'n'stein (Syllable-Jive-Version!)" (Felsenheimer) - 2:31
5. "Deine Schuld (Video)" (Urlaub) - 3:55

== B-sides ==
The three songs Biergourmet, N 48.3 and Frank'n'Stein on the CD/7" are unplugged live versions.

- "Biergourmet" [Beer gourmet is originally from "5, 6, 7, 8 - Bullenstaat!".
- "N 48.3" is originally from "Runter mit den Spendierhosen, Unsichtbarer!".
- "Frank'n'stein" is originally from "Debil".

== Personnel ==
- Farin Urlaub – vocals, guitar
- Bela B. – drums
- Rodrigo González – bass

== Charts ==
Chart (2004)	Peak position
Austria (Ö3 Austria Top 40)	34
Germany (GfK)	15
Switzerland (Schweizer Hitparade)	62
