= Evangelische Akademie Tutzing =

German academy

Coordinates: 47.9092°N 11.2822°E

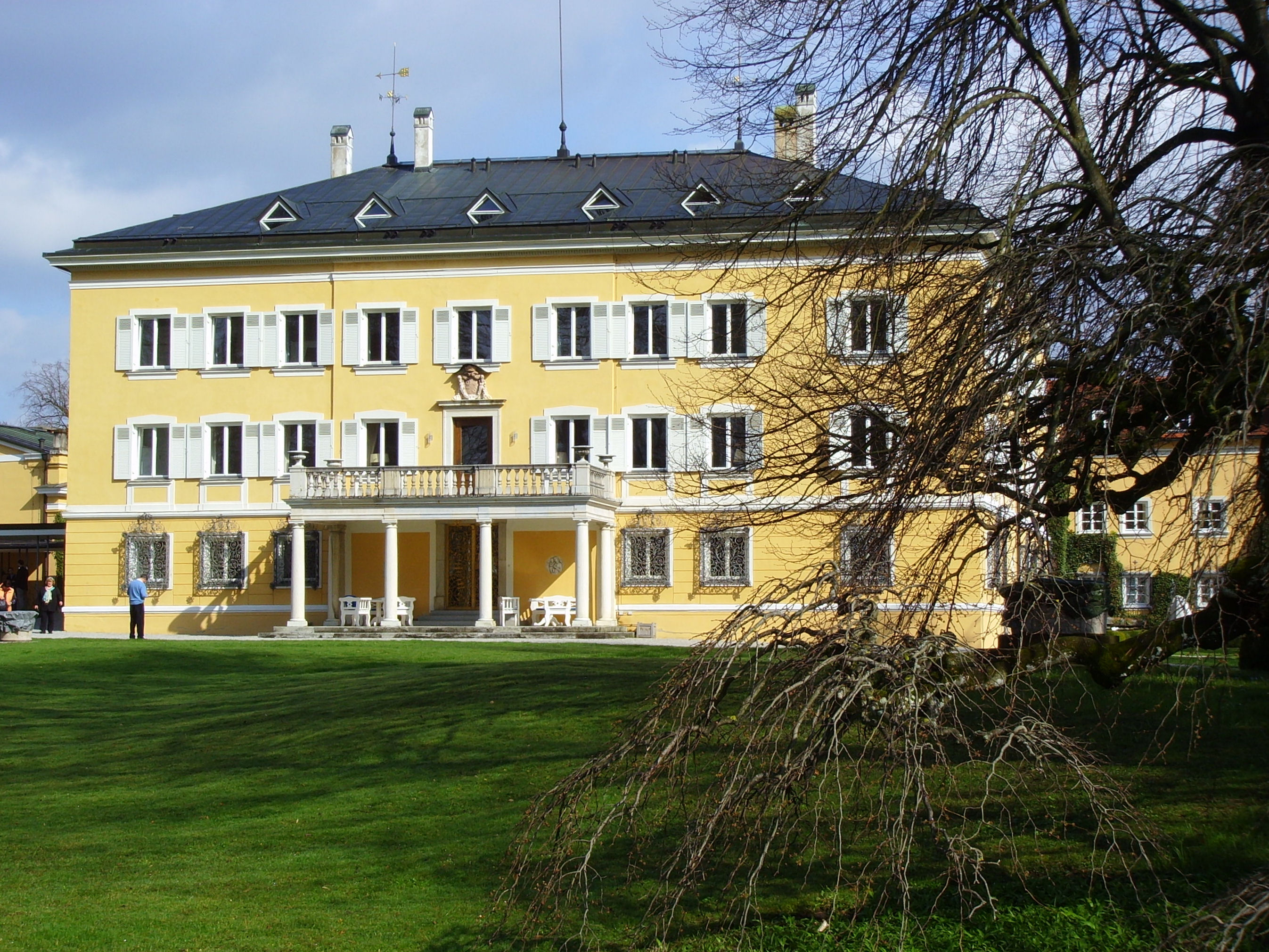
- View from the Starnberger See to the main building, Schloss Tutzing

Information
- Type: Academy
- Established: 1947
- Website: www.ev-akademie-tutzing.de

The Evangelische Akademie Tutzing (Protestant Academy of Tutzing) is an education and conference center in Tutzing, Bavaria, run by the Evangelical Lutheran Church in Bavaria. It was founded in 1947. The main building is Schloss Tutzing on Lake Starnberg. The academy awards the Marie Luise Kaschnitz Prize for contemporary literature from 1984, and the Toleranzpreis der Evangelischen Akademie Tutzing prize for tolerance, which since 2000 has been given biennially to people who worked towards the coexistence of religions.

== History ==
The Evangelische Akademie Tutzing was founded in 1947 in Tutzing, Bavaria, as Evangelisches Heimkehrer- und Freizeitheim. It was first an academy for doctors. Gerhard Hildmann, a theologian, was the director from 1948 to 1967. The bishop, Hans Meiser, coordinated the acquisition of Schloss Tutzing in 1949.

After World War II, politicians met at the academy to discuss the future of German democracy. They identified actions to be taken, which were later realized. Egon Bahr spoke on 15 July 1963 about "change through rapprochement", which influenced the relationship of chancellor Willy Brandt to the German Democratic Republic, resulting in the Ostpolitik.

Conferences at the academy initiated changes in politics, social sciences, religion, arts and culture. Topics have included the future of the European Union the integration of its countries, and concepts for the energy industry.

== Buildings and park ==
The Baroque main building was built from 1693 to 1696. It was rebuilt by Thomas Ganseck from 1802 to 1816 for Count Friedrich Joseph von Vieregg. The additional Kavaliersbau was built in the 19th century. A separate hall was erected in 1802 as a Gartenmenagerie. It was made a Palmenhaus (palm house) in 1870, and remodeled in 1922 to a banquet hall with an Italian-style ceiling. The conference hall was built in 1959 by Olaf Andreas Gulbransson as a round auditorium with seating in a circular arrangement. The park was created in 1840 as an English landscape garden and was expanded upon in 1870 by Carl von Effner. In 1980, Hans-Busso von Busse added a restaurant in wood and glass which recalls the architecture of the Palmenhaus.

== Literature ==
- Klaus-Jürgen Roepke (ed.): Schloss und Akademie Tutzing. Munich 1986.
- Udo Hahn: Schloss und Evangelische Akademie Tutzing. (In: Großer Kunstführer 280), Schnell & Steiner, Regensburg 2014.

== Gallery ==
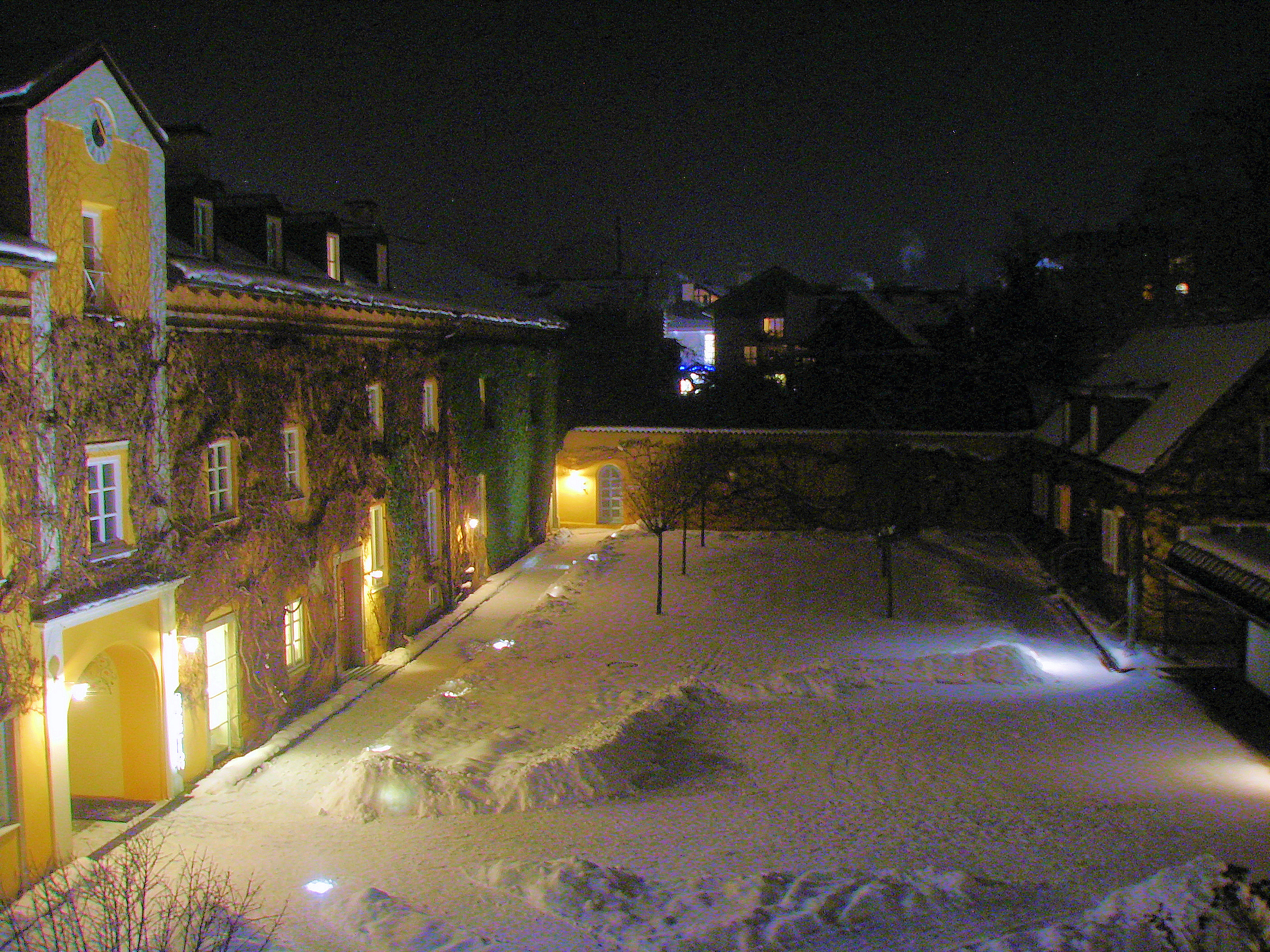
Entrance

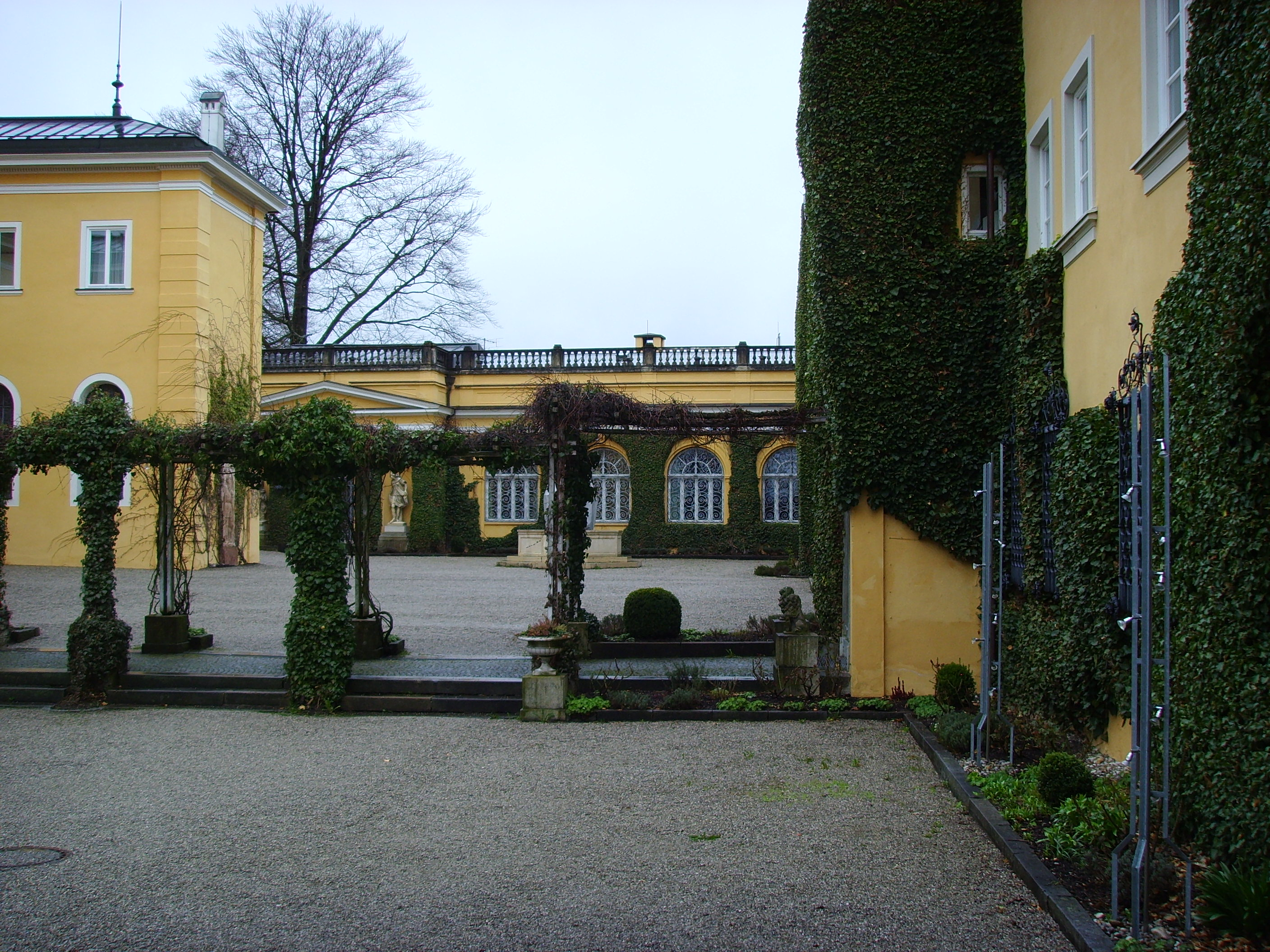
Inner courtyard

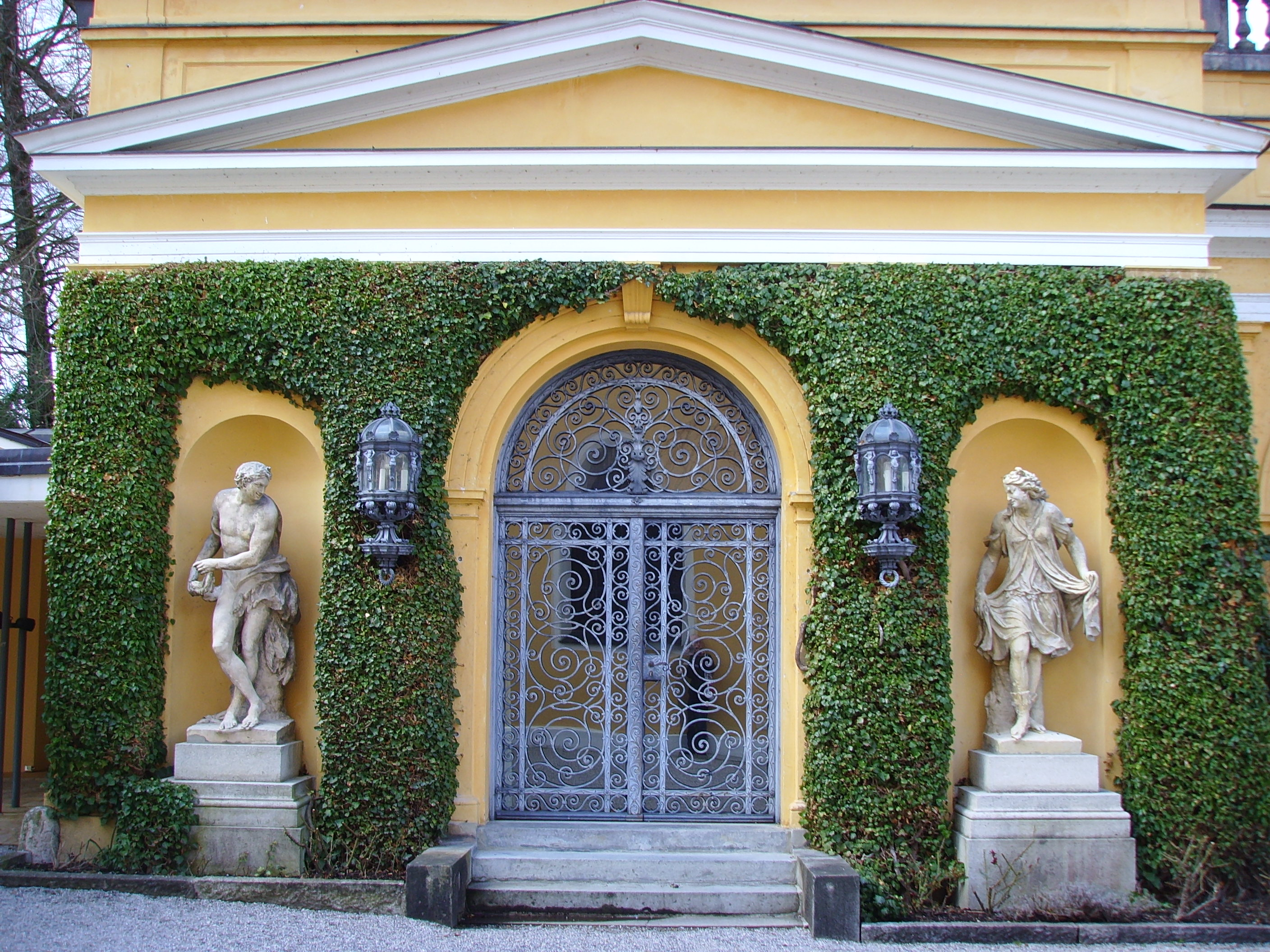
Inner courtyard of a side building

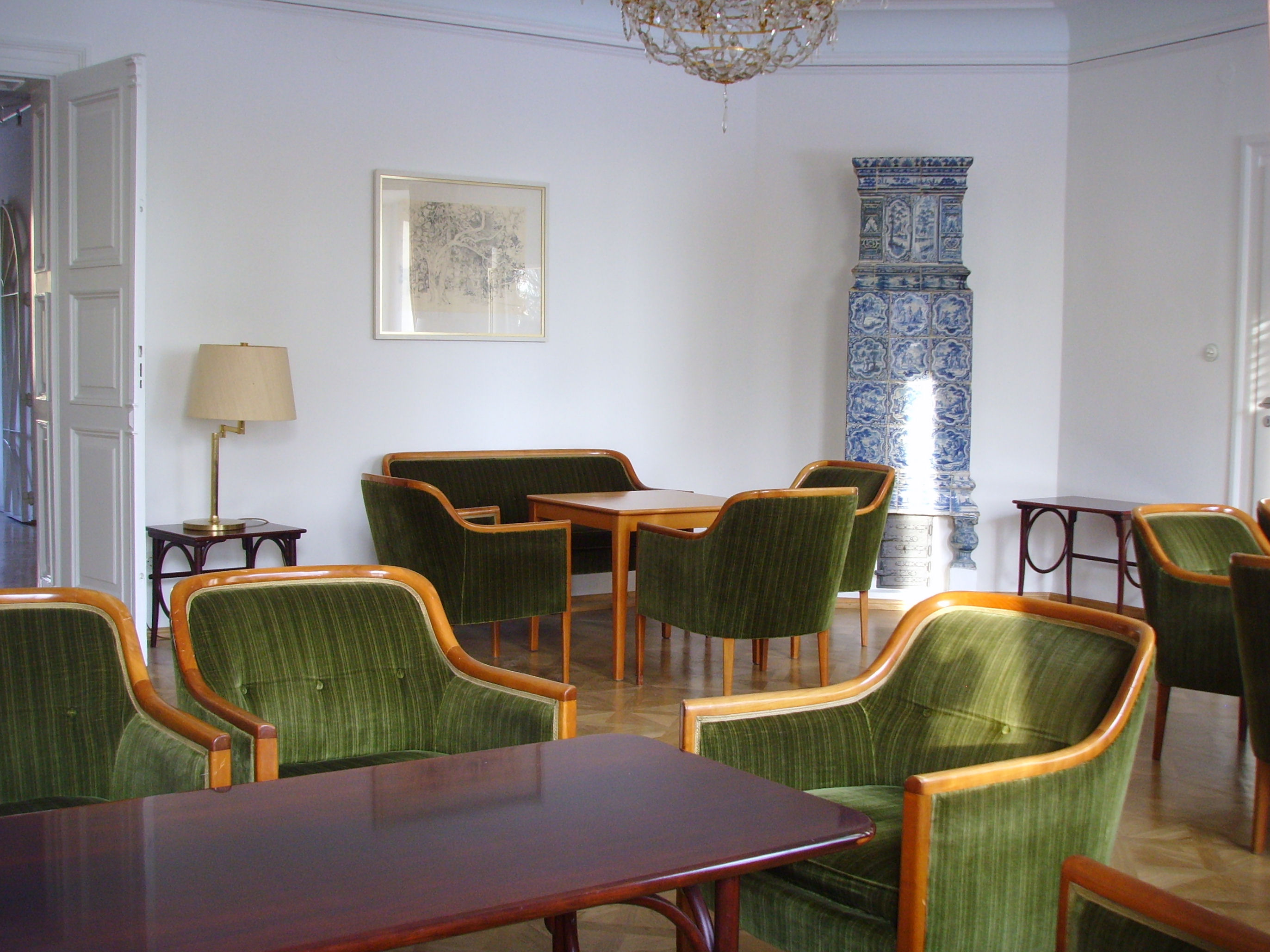
A salon

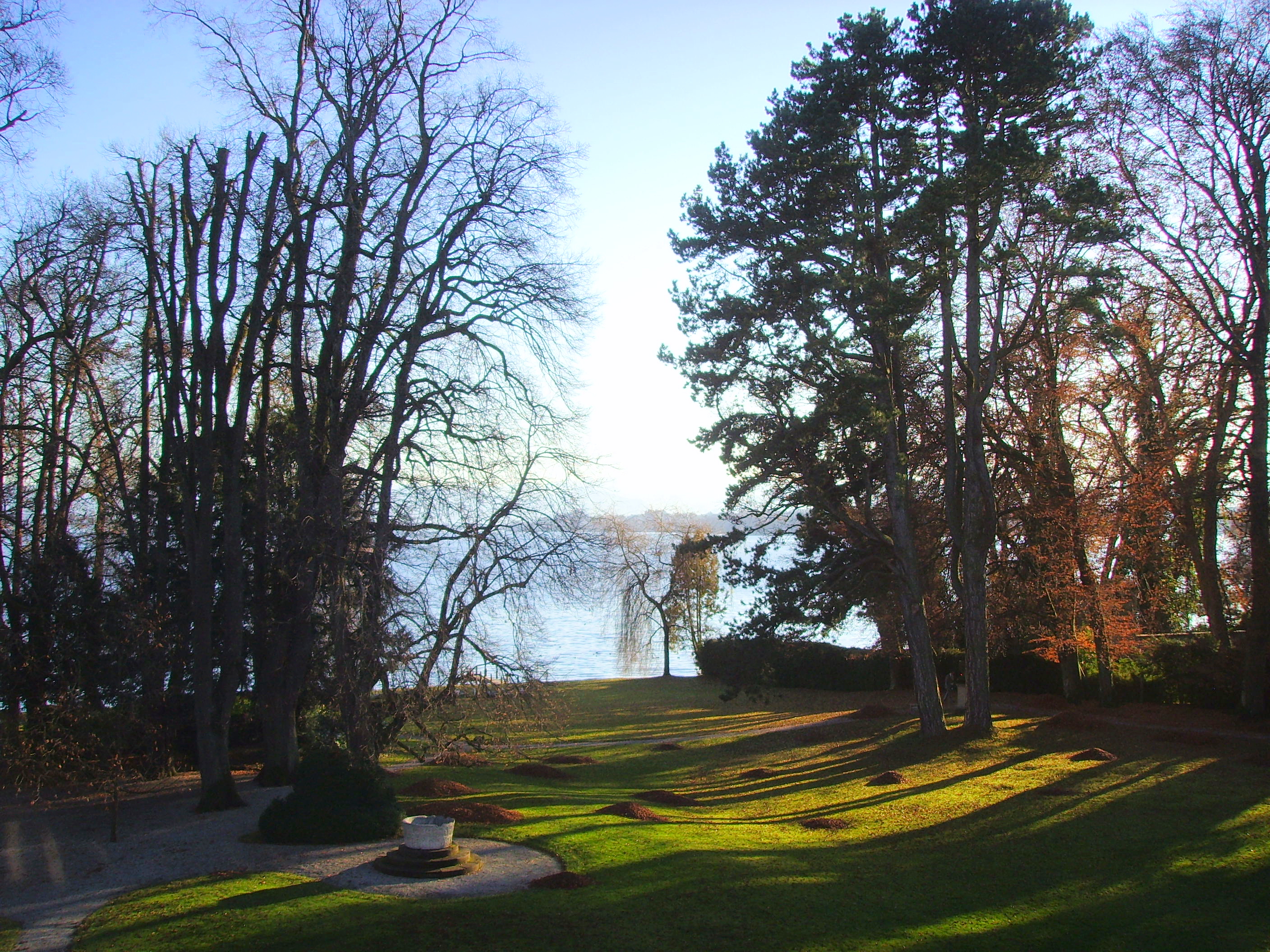
View from the main building to the lake
