= Männer sind Schweine =

Song by Die Ärzte

from the album 13
- Released: 1998
- Genre: Pop rock, reggae rock, sunshine pop
- Length: 4:17
- Label: Hot Action Records
- Songwriter: Farin Urlaub
- Producers: Uwe Hoffmann and Die Ärzte

"Ein Schwein namens Männer"

Single by Die Ärzte

from the album 13
- Released: 3 April 1998
- Genre: Pop rock, reggae rock, sunshine pop
- Length: 4:28; 3:33 (radio edit)
- Label: Hot Action Records
- Songwriter: Farin Urlaub
- Producers: Uwe Hoffmann & Die Ärzte

Die Ärzte singles chronology
"'Rockgiganten vs. Strassenköter'" (1997)	"Ein Schwein namens Männer" (1998)	"Goldenes Handwerk" (1998)

"Männer sind Schweine" ("Men are pigs") is a pop/rock song by Die Ärzte. It's the thirteenth track from their 1998 album 13. The tongue-in-cheek lyrics are based on the cliché of men always wanting sex, warning women not to fall for their false promises of true love.

== Ein Schwein namens Männer ==
The song has also been released on the single Ein Schwein namens Männer ("A pig called men"). It's the first single release from the album 13. This was the band's first single to reach number one in the German charts.

== The video ==
The video clip features a digital Lara Croft model, Eidos Interactive officially approved Lara's appearance. It starts with the band performing the song in an old warehouse. When Lara appears, the clip transforms into a John Woo style action movie including excessive shooting, fist fights and many sound effects actually eclipsing the song.

== Track listing ==
1. "Männer sind Schweine" (Urlaub) - 4:28
2. "Du bist nicht mein Freund" (Felsenheimer) - 1:38
3. "Saufen" (Urlaub) - 3:48
4. "Ein Lächeln (für jeden Tag deines Lebens)" (Felsenheimer, Gonzalez, Urlaub) - 4:21
5. "Männer sind Schweine (Jetzt noch kürzer!)" (Urlaub) - 3:33

== B-sides ==
- "Du bist nicht mein Freund" ("You are not my friend") is about somebody getting pleasure from gloating the singer.
- "Saufen" ("Boozing") is a drinking song, written by Farin Urlaub, who's a teetotaller.
- "Ein Lächeln (für jeden Tag deines Lebens)" ("A smile (for every day of your life)") features piano and (later) drums as the only instruments and the band members whisper each other's names several times throughout the song, ending in a crescendo.
- "Männer sind Schweine (Jetzt noch kürzer!)" ("Now even shorter!") is a shortened radio edit lacking the intro and only at the 5-Track-Maxi-CD.

== Personnel ==
- Farin Urlaub - vocals, guitar
- Rodrigo González - bass, keyboard
- Bela B. - drums
- Frank Delle - saxophone
- Ulrich Plettendorf - trombone
- BOb Lanese - trumpet

== Charts ==
Chart (1998)	Peak position
Austria (Ö3 Austria Top 40)	1
Germany (GfK)	1
Switzerland (Schweizer Hitparade)	1

=== Year-end charts ===
Chart (1998)	Position
Germany (Official German Charts)	3

== Certifications ==
Region	Certification	Certified units/sales
Austria (IFPI Austria)	Gold	25,000^{*}
Germany (BVMI)	2× Platinum	1,000,000^{^}
Switzerland (IFPI Switzerland)	Gold	25,000^{^}
^{*} Sales figures based on certification alone.^{^} Shipments figures based on certification alone.

== Trivia ==
The song had a massive appearance on Oktoberfest and various party music compilations which the band regarded with strong dislike. For that reason, since 2003, Die Ärzte have only once played the song live at its full length.

In a 2008 interview, Farin Urlaub referred to the song as the bands "wayward child".
