= 1/2 Lovesong =

Single by Die Ärzte

from the album 13
- Released: 10 November 1998
- Genre: Alternative rock
- Length: 3:52
- Label: Hot Action Records
- Songwriter(s): Rod Gonzalez & Dirk Felsenheimer
- Producer(s): Uwe Hoffmann & Die Ärzte

Die Ärzte singles chronology
"Goldenes Handwerk" (1998)	"1/2 Lovesong" (1998)	"Rebell" (1999)

"1/2 Lovesong" is a song by German rock band Die Ärzte. It is the sixth track and the third single from their 1998 album 13. The music of the song was composed by Rod González. The lyrics were written by Rod Gonzáles and Bela B.

The song is about missing a loved one during a hard time in a relationship. The music video is black-and-white and shows the band singing the song in a room.

== Personnel ==
- Rodrigo González – vocals, 12 string guitar, bass
- Farin Urlaub – 6 string guitar
- Bela B. – drums

== Track listing ==
1. "1/2 Lovesong" – 3:52
2. "Ein Lied über Zensur" – 3:20
3. "Schlimm" (Felsenheimer) – 3:34
4. "Danke für jeden guten Morgen" – 2:43
5. "1/2 Lovesong-Video" – 3:52

== B-sides ==
- "Ein Lied über Zensur" (A song about censorship) was initially much shorter, released on the compilation Zensur?!.
- "Schlimm" (Bad) is about suicide attempts, when one's beloved is not sure about love.
- "Danke für jeden guten Morgen" (Thanks for every good morning) was on the soundtrack for Love Your Neighbour!.

== Charts ==
Year	Country	Position
1998	Germany	28
