= Goldenes Handwerk =

Single by Die Ärzte

from the album 13
- Released: 30 August 1998
- Genre: Country rock Alternative country
- Length: 3:34
- Label: Hot Action Records
- Songwriter(s): Dirk Felsenheimer
- Producer(s): Uwe Hoffmann & Die Ärzte

Die Ärzte singles chronology
| "Ein Schwein namens Männer" (1998) | "Goldenes Handwerk" (1998) | "1/2 Lovesong" (1998) |

"Goldenes Handwerk" (Golden handicraft) is a song by German rock band Die Ärzte. It's the third track and the second single from their 1998 album 13. The song is written by and dedicated to the drummer Bela B., who, according to the lyrics, is simple-minded and stupid.

== Music video ==
In the video, the band members are riding bikes. Bela's head falls off and a trucker picks it up. He goes to a strip club with the head and a stripper takes the head for herself. Later they end up in the same bar, where the band is. The stripper says to Bela's head, that she loves him, because he's not like the other men she knows. The moment is interrupted by Bela's body, that picks the head up, while it's saying: "I'm just a regular guy, baby!" and puts it, where it belongs. He then leaves, leaving the woman in the bar, crying.

== Personnel ==
- Bela B. – vocals, drums
- Farin Urlaub – guitar, banjo
- Rodrigo González – bass
- Knut Bewersdorff – steel guitar
- Heinz Strunk – background vocals

== Track listing ==
1. "Goldenes Handwerk" – 3:34
2. "Wunderbare Welt des Farin U." – 2:45
3. "Rod Army" – 2:50
4. "Goldenes Handwerk (Drummer Mix)" – 3:46

== B-sides ==
- "Wunderbare Welt des Farin U." (Wonderful World of Farin U.) is written by Farin Urlaub and dedicated to his "wild" life.
- "Rod Army" (the name of Rodrigo "Rod" González's fan club, which was inspired by the Kiss Army) is dedicated to González, written by him and Bela B.

== Charts ==
Chart performance for "Goldenes Handwerk"
| Chart (1998) | Peak position |
|---|---|
| Germany (GfK) | 36 |
