= Komm zurück/Die Banane =

Single by Die Ärzte

from the album Unplugged - Rock'n'Roll Realschule
- Released: 25 November 2002
- Genre: Punk rock; acoustic rock
- Length: 3:29/4:59
- Label: Hot Action Records
- Songwriter(s): Track 1: Farin Urlaub; Track 2: Dirk Felsenheimer; Rodrigo González
- Producer(s): Uwe Hoffmann & Die Ärzte

Die Ärzte singles chronology
"Rock'n'Roll-Übermensch" (2001)	"Komm zurück/Die Banane" (2002)	"Unrockbar" (2003)

"Komm zurück" (Come back) and "Die Banane" (The banana) are songs by German rock band Die Ärzte. "Komm zurück" is the eleventh and "Die Banane" the seventeenth track on their 2002 live album Unplugged: Rock'n'Roll Realschule. "Komm zurück/Die Banane" is the only single (a double single) from that album.

"Komm zurück" was initially on Das ist nicht die ganze Wahrheit... and "Die Banane" on Planet Punk. "Komm zurück" was performed live for the first time ever for this record. "Komm zurück" is about missing someone. "Die Banane" is about how women eating bananas remind men of fellatio.

The videos for both songs feature footage from the concert.

== Personnel ==
=== Originals ===
==== Komm zurück ====
- Farin Urlaub - vocals, electric guitar, bass
- Bela B. - drums

==== Die Banane ====
- Bela B. - vocals, drums
- Farin Urlaub - electric guitar
- Rodrigo González - bass, keyboard

=== Komm zurück/Die Banane ===
==== Komm zurück ====
- Farin Urlaub - vocals, acoustic guitar
- Rodrigo González - acoustic bass guitar
- Bela B. - drums
- Markus Paßlick - percussion
- MTV Unplugged Orchestra - strings

==== Die Banane ====
- Bela B. - vocals, drums
- Farin Urlaub - background vocals, harmonica
- Rodrigo González - acoustic guitar
- Markus Paßlick - percussion
- MTV Unplugged Orchestra - strings, horns

== Track listing ==
1. "Komm zurück" – 3:29
2. "Die Banane" – 4:59
3. "Ist das alles?" – 4:12
4. "Sommer, Palmen, Sonnenschein" – 2:42
5. "3-Tage-Bart" – 3:24

== B-sides ==
The B-sides are live 'unplugged' recordings from the same concert as the A-sides not released on the album.

- "Ist das alles?" [Is that all?] is from Die Ärzte.
- "Sommer, Palmen, Sonnenschein" [Summer, palms, sunshine] was on Uns geht's prima... and on Die Ärzte früher!.
- "3-Tage-Bart" [Stubble] is from Le Frisur.

== Charts ==
Year	Country	Position
2002	Germany	34
