= Friedenspanzer =

Single by Die Ärzte

from the album Die Bestie in Menschengestalt
- Released: 1994
- Genre: Punk rock, hard rock
- Length: 4:00; 3:56 (album version)
- Label: Metronome Musik GmbH
- Songwriters: Rod Gonzalez & Bela B.
- Producers: Uwe Hoffmann & Die Ärzte

Die Ärzte singles chronology
"Mach die Augen zu" (1993)	"Friedenspanzer" (1994)	"Quark" (1994)

"Friedenspanzer" (in German: Peace tank) is a punk song by Die Ärzte. It's the thirteenth track and the third single from their 1993 album Die Bestie in Menschengestalt. This song is about a war machine, that spreads peace, love and solutions for problems in the world, and helps people. "Friedenspanzer" and "Schopenhauer" on the maxi single are identical versions as on the usual single.

The opening lines "Ich möchte eine Welt, in der Würmer und Insekten endlich wieder schmecken. Ich möchte eine Welt, in der ich aus einer Toilette trinken kann ohne Ausschlag zu kriegen." (I want a world, where insects and worms are tasty again. I want a world, where I can drink out of the toilet without getting a rash.) are samples from the end of the German version of the film "The Naked Gun 2½: The Smell of Fear".

The song was written by Bela B. Felsenheimer and Rodrigo González. In the album version, González for the first time sings the verses and bridge. The pre-chorus and chorus however are sung Felsenheimer, who sings the entire song in the single version.

== The video ==
The video features the band performing live and in between showing clips of scenes in a bathroom, where the band members and groupies at different times are, later having all the band members and a whole lot of groupies singing in there.

== Personnel ==
- Rodrigo González – lead vocals (album), lead guitar, bass
- Bela B. – lead vocals (single), drums
- Farin Urlaub – background vocals, rhythm guitar

== Track listing ==
=== 2 track CD/Vinyl single ===
1. "Friedenspanzer (Neue Super-Fassung, ehrlich!)" (González/Felsenheimer) - 4:00
2. "Schopenhauer (Auch neu, auch super, auch ehrlich)" (Urlaub) - 3:06

=== 5" Maxi CD ===
1. "Friedenspanzer" (Gonzalez/Felsenheimer) - 4:00
2. "Die Wikingjugend hat mein Mädchen entführt" (The Ramones/Felsenheimer) - 2:28
3. "Stick It Out/What's the Ugliest Part of Your Body" (Frank Zappa) - 3:08
4. "Die Allerschürfste (Outtake)" (Urlaub) - 1:30
5. "Schopenhauer (Neu)" (Urlaub) - 3:06

== B-sides ==
- "Die Wikingjugend hat mein Mädchen entführt" is the German version of The Ramones' song "The KKK Took My Baby Away"; the song was on "Blitzkrieg over You!: A Tribute to the Ramones".
- Both "Stick It Out" and "What's the Ugliest Part of Your Body?" are Frank Zappa covers with partly German language texts.
- The original versions of "Die Allerschürfste" and "Schopenhauer" are from "Die Bestie in Menschengestalt".

== Charts ==
Year	Country	Position
1994	Germany	32
