= Rebell =

Single by Die Ärzte

from the album 13
- Released: 6 June 1999
- Genre: Punk rock
- Length: 3:52
- Label: Hot Action Records
- Songwriter: Farin Urlaub
- Producers: Uwe Hoffmann & Die Ärzte

Die Ärzte singles chronology
"1/2 Lovesong" (1998)	"Rebell" (1999)	"Die Schönen und das Biest: Elke (live)" (1999)

"Rebell" (German for "rebel") is a song by German rock band Die Ärzte. It's the ninth track and the fourth and final single from their 1998 album 13. The song is about the rebellious attitude of adolescents, which it criticises ironically at times.

The music video is in greyscale and shows the band singing the song, while the lyrics appear on the screen in red. It was filmed in a One-Take.

== Personnel ==
- Farin Urlaub - vocals, guitar
- Rodrigo González – bass
- Bela B. - drums

== Track listing ==
1. "Rebell" – 3:52
2. "Punk ist..." (Götz Alsmann Band feat. Die Ärzte) – 3:23
3. "Backpfeifengesicht" – 2:24
4. "Alles für dich" – 4:11

== B-sides ==
- The original Die Ärzte version of "Punk ist..." ("Punk is...") can be found on the album 13.
- "Backpfeifengesicht" ("Slapface") is about a repulsive man.
- "Alles für dich" ("Everything for you") is a humorous song about wanting to marry somebody and promising a lot for her (not crossing the reality line).

== Charts ==
Chart (1999)	Peak position
Germany (GfK)	42
