= Geräusch =

Studio album by Die Ärzte
- Released: 29 September 2003
- Genre: Punk rock, pop punk, alternative rock
- Length: CD1: 48:16; CD2: 47:50
- Label: Hot Action Records
- Producer: Uwe Hoffmann & Die Ärzte

Die Ärzte chronology
Unplugged - Rock'n'Roll Realschule (2002)	Geräusch (2003)	Die Band, die sie Pferd nannten (2004)

Rotes Geräusch

Singles from Geräusch
- 1. "Unrockbar" Released: 15 September 2003; 2. "Dinge von denen" Released: 24 November 2003; 3. "Nichts in der Welt" Released: 13 April 2004; 4. "Deine Schuld" Released: 12 June 2004; 5. "Die klügsten Männer der Welt" Released: 22 November 2004

Professional ratings
Review scores
Source	Rating
Rolling Stone	2/5 stars
laut.de	3/5 stars

Geräusch ("Noise" or "Sound") is a studio album by German rock band Die Ärzte. The album was sold on two CDs that look like LPs. The package is designed, using upside-down techniques, to make it difficult to decide which of the covers is the front. It's also the first album of the band that tuned their instruments (guitar and bass) a half step down from the standard tuning, leaving them on E♭ tuning onwards.

== Track listing ==
Schwarzes Geräusch ("Black noise")

1. "Als ich den Punk erfand..." ("When I invented punk...") (Felsenheimer, Urlaub) – 1:53
  - "Hände innen" ("Hands inside") (Urlaub) is hidden in the pregap of this song, starting at -3:59
2. "System" (Urlaub) - 2:44
3. "T-Error" (González/González, Blitz) – 3:37
4. "Nicht allein" ("Not alone") (Urlaub) - 5:19
5. "Dinge von denen" ("Things of which") (González/González, Blitz) - 3:57
6. "Der Grund" ("The reason") (Felsenheimer) - 2:54
7. "Geisterhaus" ("Ghost house") (González/González, Blitz) – 3:49
8. "Ein Mann" ("A man") (Urlaub) – 2:18
9. "Anders als beim letzten Mal" ("Different from last time") (Urlaub) – 4:17
10. "Ruhig angehn" ("Takin' it calmly") (Felsenheimer) – 3:24
11. "Jag älskar Sverige!" (Swedish: "I love Sweden!") (Urlaub) – 3:40
12. "Richtig schön evil" ("Really quite evil") (Felsenheimer) – 3:21
13. "Schneller leben" ("Live faster") (Urlaub) – 3:03

Rotes Geräusch ("Red noise")

1. "Unrockbar" ("Unrockable" (rough translation)) (Urlaub) – 4:01
2. "Deine Schuld" ("Your fault") (Urlaub) – 3:35
3. "Lovepower" (González/González, Blitz) – 2:32
4. "Der Tag" ("The day") (Urlaub) – 3:48
5. "Die Nacht" ("The night") (Felsenheimer) – 5:02
6. "Nichts in der Welt" ("Nothing in the world") (Urlaub) – 3:47
7. "Die klügsten Männer der Welt" ("The wisest men in the world") (Felsenheimer) – 3:58
8. "Piercing" (González/González, Blitz) – 4:17
9. "Besserwisserboy" ("Knowitallboy") (Urlaub) – 3:41
10. "Anti-Zombie" (González/González, Blitz) – 4:09
11. "Pro-Zombie" (Urlaub) – 2:08
12. "WAMMW" (short for "Wenn alle Männer Mädchen wären" - "If all men were girls") (Urlaub) – 1:51
13. "NichtWissen" ("NotKnowing") (Felsenheimer) – 4:59

== Lyrical meaning and song notes ==
=== Als ich den Punk erfand... ===
Bela recounts the absurd tale of him inventing punk rock, and subsequently jazz.

=== System ===
The song juxtaposes the banal daily life of a number of people in the verse against a call to rise up against an oppressive regime during the chorus. Both verses and the chorus following them use the multiple meanings of a single German word ("stehen" and "setzen") differentiating them by context. The second verse is also consequential to the situations in the first verse.

=== T-Error ===
Sung from the perspective of a stalker who harasses his target with phone calls. The obsession quickly turns to desire for vengeance when the calls are being ignored. The name of the song is punctuated to resemble the logo of the Deutsche Telekom.

=== Nicht allein ===
Farin asks a number of rhetorical questions to the listener about the frustration presumably experienced, subsequently reassuring the listener that he or she is not alone in feeling this way.

=== Dinge von denen ===
Rod recounts his experiences of being bothered by chatterboxes and other annoying people.

=== Der Grund ===
The song describes multiple people (one a would-be-protester, the other a company president) trying to do good, only to be distracted from their goals by a not explicitly named reason.

=== Geisterhaus ===
The singer attempts to warn people from their mindless consumerism, only to be ignored.

=== Ein Mann ===
Sung from the perspective of a typical macho, self-righteous, arrogant and obsessed with sex.

=== Anders als beim letzten mal ===
The singer experiences an abrupt but subtle change in a relationship and airs his desire to return to a previous state of it.

=== Ruhig angehen ===
Advises the listener to not stress himself and approach things slowly and calmly.

=== Jag Älskar Sverige ===
The song praises the culture and environment of Sweden, though the song is actually talking about Brazil.

=== Richtig Schön Evil ===
A song listing a number of perverted or disgusting ideas, countered by the chorus telling the listener to not take it so seriously. In the last part of the song, Bela describes Farin and his solo project as terrorism and a threat to society to a policeman, also referencing the cover of Endlich Urlaub!. The song closes with a phone call of Bela to Rod, acknowledging that they are working together to get rid of Farin.

=== Schneller Leben ===
An advice to the listener to die as early as possible in order to escape the tribulations of aging. The song also counts up a number of famous people that died early (Jimi Hendrix, Bruce Lee and Kurt Cobain) and also mentions that it is too late for the singer, Farin. The track is titled "Oje, was singen Die denn da? AAAAAAAAAAARRRRRRGGGGGHHHH" (Oh dear, what are they singing?) in CD-Text.

=== Unrockbar ===
Farin sings to his girlfriend, who he is forced to break up with over differences about their taste in music.

=== Deine Schuld ===
The song tells the listener that while there are problems in this world, it's not his or her fault. However, they would be at fault if it remained that way. Thus the song calls for the listener to change things.

=== Lovepower ===
The narcissistic singer praises the looks of his image in the mirror.

=== Der Tag ===
In a duet, two former lovers quarrel over their past love and their current disgust with each other, proclaiming that the day they miss each other has yet to come. They are however forced to deal with each other, due to an unintended pregnancy.

=== Die Nacht ===
A song praising the mystery and lack of inhibition during nighttime.

=== Nichts in der Welt ===
A lover's lament about a recent break-up.

=== Die Klügsten Männer der Welt ===
A sarcastic song of praise to the political leaders of the world.

=== Piercing ===
Rod describes a recent episode in which he had his penis pierced for his girlfriend, though the couple broke up soon after (before the swelling went down) and advises the listener to not follow the same path.

=== Besserwisserboy ===
A song describing the hatred for a local know-it-all.

=== Anti-zombie ===
The zombie apocalypse broke out and the band is fighting for their lives and relishes the destruction of the undead. The beginning and the end of the song contain samples of the German dub of Dawn of the Dead.

=== Pro-Zombie ===
Farin describes his desire to become a zombie and live a carefree life.

=== WAMMW ===
The singer tells how great a world would be in which all people are women. Stereotypically, all women are sensitive and respectful to each other and thus the problems and social evils present in the modern world would be nonexistent. His ulterior motives are revealed at the end of the song, with him being the only man.

=== Nichtwissen ===
A song about the desire to ignore worldly problems and social evils while occupying oneself with inconsequential trivialities.

== Singles ==
- 2003: "Unrockbar"
- 2003: "Dinge von denen"
- 2004: "Nichts in der Welt"
- 2004: "Deine Schuld"
- 2004: "Die klügsten Männer der Welt"

== Personnel ==
- Farin Urlaub - guitar, vocals
- Bela Felsenheimer - drums, vocals
- Rodrigo González - bass guitar, vocals
- Celina Bostic - additional vocals on 4 (CD2)
- Gunter Gabriel - additional vocals on 9 (CD2)
- Martin Klempnow - additional vocals on 10 (CD2)

== Charts ==
=== Weekly charts ===
Chart (2003)	Peak position
Austrian Albums (Ö3 Austria)	2
German Albums (Offizielle Top 100)	1
Swiss Albums (Schweizer Hitparade)	7

=== Year-end charts ===
Chart (2003)	Position
Austrian Albums (Ö3 Austria)	23
German Albums (Offizielle Top 100)	28
Swiss Albums (Schweizer Hitparade)	86

Chart (2004)	Position
German Albums (Offizielle Top 100)	72
