= Schrei nach Liebe =

Single by Die Ärzte

from the album Die Bestie in Menschengestalt
- Released: 10 September 1993
- Genre: Punk rock
- Length: 4:13
- Label: Metronome Musik
- Songwriters: Dirk Felsenheimer & Farin Urlaub
- Producers: Uwe Hoffmann & Die Ärzte

Die Ärzte singles chronology
"Bitte bitte" (1989)	"Schrei nach Liebe" (1993)	"Mach die Augen zu" (1993)

"Schrei nach Liebe" ("Cry for Love") is a punk rock song by German band Die Ärzte. It is the second track and the first single from their 1993 album Die Bestie in Menschengestalt. It is one of the best known political anthems and anti-fascist songs in Germany and was made in the context of the Hoyerswerda riots.

== Content and music style ==
The verses tell the story of a fictional right-wing extremist, who gets insulted. Excerpts from the song's lyrics (with English translation):

"Du bist wirklich saudumm […] Alles muss man dir erklären, weil du wirklich gar nichts weißt…"
"You are really stupid […] Everything has to be explained to you, because you really don't know anything…"

In the chorus the insults go further:

"Deine Gewalt ist nur ein stummer Schrei nach Liebe […] Du hast nie gelernt dich zu artikulieren. Und deine Eltern hatten niemals für dich Zeit".
"Your violence is just a silent scream for love […] You never learned to express yourself. And your parents never had time for you".

The chorus ends with "Arschloch", which is German for "Asshole".

== Commercial success ==
Originally the song was chosen by the band as their first single after a five years break in September 1993. The band found it difficult to convince its music company Metronome to release the song because of the prominent use of the term "Arschloch" (arsehole). After its release lot of radio stations denied radio airplay as well, but in an open letter, Lidia Antonini of Hessischer Rundfunk requested radio stations to play the song, a request which was widely followed. As a result, the song became the first top 10 hit for the band in Germany.

In 2015 music teacher Gerhard Torges started his "Aktion Arschloch" as a social media action. He called on people to buy the single as a sign of solidarity with refugees and to act against xenophobic riots in Germany. After a week the song re-entered the official singles charts and became number 1 in September 2015. Die Ärzte supported the action by donating all profits from the sales of the song and performing for the refugee advocacy organization Pro Asyl.

== Music video ==
In the beginning three men wielding a chainsaw, an axe and something on a chain, with evil glints in their eyes, walk towards a church. Two children, one of them dark-skinned, the other one cross-eyed, run inside the church and hide under coffins. The weapon-wielding men find two old women and a man (Rodrigo González) sitting inside the church as Farin and Bela B. rise from the coffins and address the fascists directly. The three men are stunned by what they are told and their tough exterior shell breaks. In the end of the song, the two children who had run in to find sanctuary in the church clean their faces, removing the make-up which had ringed their eyes.

== Personnel ==
- Farin Urlaub – vocals (verses), guitar
- Bela B. – vocals (chorus), drums
- Rodrigo González – bass

== Track listing ==
1. "Wenn es Abend wird" - 6:30
2. "Schrei nach Liebe" - 4:13

=== Maxi ===
1. "Wenn es Abend wird" - 6:30
2. "Schrei nach Liebe" - 4:13
3. "Felicita" - 0:52
4. "Já (Demo)" - 2:38

== B-sides ==
- "Wenn es Abend wird" ("When the evening comes") is from Die Bestie in Menschengestalt.
- "Felicita" (Italian: "Joy") is sung in Italian, a parody cover of the song by Al Bano and Romina Power.
- "Já" (Portuguese: "By now") is sung in Portuguese.

== Cover versions ==
Belgian women's choir Scala & Kolacny Brothers covered the song in 2004 and was released as a single. German punk band Die Toten Hosen covered the song in 2012 on the second disc of their anniversary album Ballast der Republik.

== Charts ==
=== Weekly charts ===
Chart (1993)	Peak position
Austria (Ö3 Austria Top 40)	6
Germany (GfK)	9

Chart (2015)	Peak position
Austria (Ö3 Austria Top 40)	1
Germany (GfK)	1
Switzerland (Schweizer Hitparade)	6

=== Decade-end charts ===
Chart (1990–1999)	Rank
Austria (Ö3 Austria Top 40)	75

== Certifications ==
"Schrei nach Liebe" was certified gold in Germany during 1994.
