= Die Bestie in Menschengestalt =

Studio album by Die Ärzte
- Released: 5 October 1993
- Recorded: 1993
- Genre: Punk rock
- Length: 62:55
- Label: Metronome
- Producer: Uwe Hoffmann & Die Ärzte

Die Ärzte chronology
Die Ärzte früher! (1989)	Die Bestie in Menschengestalt (1993)	Das Beste von kurz nach früher bis jetze (1994)

Singles from Die Bestie in Menschengestalt
- 1. "Schrei nach Liebe" Released: 10 September 1993; 2. "Mach die Augen zu" Released: 15 November 1993; 3. "Friedenspanzer" Released: 1994; 4. "Quark" Released: 1994

Die Bestie in Menschengestalt (German for "The beast in human form") is the fifth album by German rock band Die Ärzte. It is also the first album with their new bassist Rodrigo González and a comeback album after a five-year hiatus.

== Track listing ==
1. "Inntro" – 0:06
2. "Schrei nach Liebe" – 4:12
3. "Schopenhauer" – 3:06
4. "Für uns" – 4:42
5. "Hey Huh (in Scheiben)" – 1:29
6. "FaFaFa" – 1:41
7. "Deutschrockgirl" – 1:53
8. "Mach die Augen zu" – 4:00
9. "Gehirn-Stürm" – 4:04
10. "Mit dem Schwert nach Polen, warum René?" – 4:28
11. "Claudia (Teil 95)" – 0:09
12. "Die Allerschürfste" – 3:24
13. "Friedenspanzer" – 3:56
14. "Quark" – 2:45
15. "Dos corazones" – 3:47
16. "Kopfüber in die Hölle" – 2:54
17. "Omaboy" – 4:45
18. "Lieber Tee" – 4:47
19. "Wenn es Abend wird" – 6:36

== Singles ==
1993: "Schrei nach Liebe"
1993: "Mach die Augen zu"
1994: "Friedenspanzer"
1994: "Quark"

== Personnel ==
- Farin Urlaub - guitar, vocals
- Bela Felsenheimer - drums, vocals
- Rodrigo González - bass guitar, vocals
- Heinz Strunk - talk on track 9

== Charts ==
Chart (1993)	Peak position
Austrian Albums (Ö3 Austria)	1
Danish Albums (Hitlisten)	29
German Albums (Offizielle Top 100)	2
Swiss Albums (Schweizer Hitparade)	8
