= Planet Punk =

Studio album by Die Ärzte
- Released: 15 September 1995
- Recorded: 1995
- Genre: Punk rock
- Length: 57:51
- Label: Metronome
- Producer: Uwe Hoffmann & Die Ärzte

Die Ärzte chronology
Das Beste von kurz nach früher bis jetze (1994)	Planet Punk (1995)	1, 2, 3, 4 – Bullenstaat! (1995)

Singles from Planet Punk
- 1. "Ein Song namens Schunder" Released: 1995; 2. "Hurra" Released: 1995; 3. "Rod ♥ You" Released: 1995 (promo)

Planet Punk is an album released by German rock band Die Ärzte on 15 September 1995. According to the band's autobiography, band guitarist Farin Urlaub considers it to be their best album.

== Track listing ==
No.	Title	Lyrics	Music	Length
1.	"Super Drei" ("Super three")	González, Felsenheimer, Urlaub	González, Urlaub	2:15
2.	"Schunder-Song"	Urlaub	Urlaub	3:06
3.	"Hurra" ("Hooray")	Urlaub	Urlaub	3:26
4.	"Geh mit mir" ("Date me", lit. "Go with me")	Felsenheimer	Felsenheimer	2:29
5.	"Langweilig" ("Bored", lit. "Boring")	Urlaub	Urlaub	3:07
6.	"Mein Freund Michael" ("My friend Michael")	Urlaub	Urlaub	3:38
7.	"Rod ♥ You"	Felsenheimer, González	Felsenheimer, González	3:26
8.	"Der Misanthrop" ("The misanthrope")	Urlaub	Urlaub	3:22
9.	"Vermissen, Baby" ("Miss[ing], baby" [from the line Du wirst mich vermissen, Baby - "You will miss me, baby"])	Felsenheimer	González	3:37
10.	"Nazareth (Blumen my ass)"	Felsenheimer	Felsenheimer	4:20
11.	"Meine Ex(plodierte Freundin)" ("My ex(ploded girlfriend)")	Urlaub	Urlaub	3:39
12.	"Die Banane" ("The banana")	Felsenheimer	Felsenheimer, González	4:33
13.	"B.S.L." (Brutaler, schneller Lärm - "Brutal, rapid noise")	Urlaub	Urlaub	2:35
14.	"Die traurige Ballade von Susi Spakowski" ("The sad ballad of Susi Spakowski")	Felsenheimer	Felsenheimer	4:01
15.	"Red mit mir" ("Talk to me")	Urlaub	Urlaub	3:58
16.	"Trick 17 m. S." (Trick 17 mit Selbstüberlistung - "...with self-circumvention")	Urlaub	Urlaub	3:04
17.	"Opfer" ("Victim")	Urlaub	Urlaub	3:01

== Personnel ==
- Farin Urlaub – guitar, vocals
- Bela Felsenheimer - drums, vocals
- Rodrigo González – bass, vocals
- Jasmin Tabatabai – additional vocals on 4, backing vocals on 7
- Chichi – backing vocals on 7, 12
- Heinz Strunk – flute on 7, backing vocals on 11

== Charts ==
=== Weekly charts ===
Chart (1995)	Peak position
Austrian Albums (Ö3 Austria)	3
German Albums (Offizielle Top 100)	2
Swiss Albums (Schweizer Hitparade)	4

=== Year-end charts ===
Chart (1995)	Position
Austrian Albums (Ö3 Austria)	45
German Albums (Offizielle Top 100)	28
Chart (1996)	Position
German Albums (Offizielle Top 100)	39
