= Schunder-Song =

Song by Die Ärzte

Song by Die Ärzte

from the album Planet Punk
- Released: 1995
- Genre: Punk rock; pop punk; ska punk
- Length: 3:06
- Label: Metronome Musik
- Songwriter: Farin Urlaub
- Producers: Uwe Hoffmann and Die Ärzte

"Ein Song namens Schunder"

Single by Die Ärzte

from the album Planet Punk
- Released: 1995
- Genre: Punk rock
- Length: 3:01 (single edit); 3:06 (album version)
- Label: Metronome Musik
- Songwriter: Farin Urlaub
- Producers: Uwe Hoffmann & Die Ärzte

Die Ärzte singles chronology
"Quark" (1994)	"Ein Song namens Schunder" (1995)	"Hurra" (1995)

"Schunder-Song" is a punk rock song by German band Die Ärzte. It's the second track from their 1995 album Planet Punk. The song got the name from Die Ärzte's crew member Erik Schunder. It's about standing up to somebody who has bullied you all your life, and describes the revenge by beating the bully up. The music video features the band performing the song on a theatre stage.

The song was released as a single under the title "Ein Song namens Schunder" ("a song called Schunder").

== Track listing ==
1. "Schunder-Song" (Single-Edit) - 3:01
2. "Regierung" - 2:32

=== Maxi single ===
1. "Schunder-Song" (Single-Edit) - 3:01
2. "Is ja irre" - 1:22
3. "Regierung" - 2:32
4. "Unholy" - 3:28

== B-sides ==
- "Regierung" (Government) was initially titled "Regierung 1986" and released on a compilation.
- "Unholy" is the German version of the song by Kiss; it was first on the Kiss tribute album Kiss My Ass: Classic Kiss Regrooved.

== Personnel ==
- Farin Urlaub – lead vocals, guitar
- Rodrigo González – bass
- Bela B. – drums

== Charts ==
Year	Country	Position
1995	Germany	4
1995	Austria	18
1995	Switzerland	11
