= Le Frisur =

Studio album by Die Ärzte
- Released: 24 May 1996
- Recorded: 1996
- Genre: Pop punk, comedy rock
- Length: 45:25
- Label: Metronome
- Producer: Uwe Hoffmann, Die Ärzte

Die Ärzte chronology
1, 2, 3, 4 – Bullenstaat! (1995)	Le Frisur (1996)	13 (1998)

Singles from Le Frisur
- 1. "3-Tage-Bart" Released: 24 May 1996; 2. "Mein Baby war beim Frisör" Released: 30 August 1996

Le Frisur ("Le hairdo", using the female German noun with the male French article) is a concept album by German rock band Die Ärzte. It was released on 24 May 1996, and is entirely about hair. Originally intended as an EP, Le Frisur developed into a full-length album within the 14 days of its recording process.

== Track listing ==
No.	Title	Lyrics	Music	Length
1.	"Erklärung" ("Declaration")	Felsenheimer	Felsenheimer, Gonzalez, Urlaub	0:55
2.	"Mein Baby war beim Frisör" ("My baby was at the barber")	Urlaub	Urlaub	2:16
3.	"Vokuhila Superstar" ("Mullet superstar")	Felsenheimer	Felsenheimer	4:59
4.	"3-Tage-Bart" ("Stubble", lit. "3-days-beard")	Urlaub	Felsenheimer, Urlaub	3:03
5.	"No Future (Ohne neue Haarfrisur)" ("No future (without a new haircut)")	Urlaub	Urlaub	2:07
6.	"Look, Don't Touch"	Felsenheimer	Felsenheimer	2:15
7.	"Straight Outta Bückeburg"	Urlaub	Urlaub	4:28
8.	"Medusa-Man (Serienmörder Ralf)" ("Serial killer Ralf")	Felsenheimer	Felsenheimer, Ludwig	5:56
9.	"Haar" ("Hair", cover of the musical of the same name)	Brandin	MacDermot	4:07
10.	"Dauerwelle vs. Minipli" ("Permanent wave vs. minipli")	Felsenheimer, Gonzalez, Urlaub	Felsenheimer, Gonzalez, Urlaub	0:53
11.	"Der Afro von Paul Breitner" ("The afro of Paul Breitner")	Felsenheimer, Gonzalez, Urlaub	Felsenheimer, Gonzalez, Urlaub	1:59
12.	"Motherfucker 666"	Urlaub	Urlaub	3:00
13.	"Monika"	Urlaub	Urlaub	0:44
14.	"Hair Today, Gone Tomorrow" (a reference to "Here Today, Gone Tomorrow")	Felsenheimer	Felsenheimer	2:54
15.	"Am Ende meines Körpers" ("At the end of my body")	Urlaub	Urlaub	2:46
16.	"Kaperfahrt" ("Caper ride")	Traditional	Traditional	2:20
17.	"Zusammenfassung" ("Summary")			0:04

== Personnel ==
- Farin Urlaub – guitar, vocals
- Bela Felsenheimer – drums, vocals
- Rodrigo González – bass guitar, vocals

== Charts ==
=== Weekly charts ===
1996 weekly chart performance for Le Frisur
Chart (1996)	Peak position
Austrian Albums (Ö3 Austria)	6
German Albums (Offizielle Top 100)	4
Swiss Albums (Schweizer Hitparade)	8

2023 weekly chart performance for Le Frisur
Chart (2023)	Peak position
German Albums (Offizielle Top 100)	3

=== Year-end charts ===
Chart (1996)	Position
Austrian Albums (Ö3 Austria)	43
German Albums (Offizielle Top 100)	28
Swiss Albums (Schweizer Hitparade)	31
