= List of best-selling singles by year (Germany) =

This is a list of the twenty best-selling singles on the Media Control Charts in Germany for every year since 2000. The data, provided by Media Control, is based on the singles sold.

== 2000 ==
#	Artist	Nationality	Title
1	Anton featuring DJ Ötzi	Austria	"Anton aus Tirol"
2	Rednex	Sweden	"The Spirit of the Hawk"
3	ATC	Germany United Kingdom Australia	"Around the World (La La La La La)"
4	Bomfunk MC's	Finland United Kingdom	"Freestyler"
5	Bon Jovi	United States	"It's My Life"
6	Zlatko^{(de)}	Germany	"Ich vermiss dich... (wie die Hölle)"
7	Santana featuring The Product G&B	United States	"Maria Maria"
8	Zlatko & Jürgen	Germany	"Großer Bruder"
9	Ayman	Germany/Tunisia	"Mein Stern"
10	Britney Spears	United States	"Lucky"
11	French Affair	Germany	"My Heart Goes Boom (La Di Da Da)"
12	Die 3. Generation	Germany	"Leb!"
13	Reamonn	Germany	"Supergirl"
14	Melanie C	United Kingdom	"I Turn To You"
15	Britney Spears	United States	"Oops!... I Did It Again"
16	Madonna	United States	"American Pie"
17	Vengaboys	Netherlands	"Shalala Lala"
18	Gigi D'Agostino	Italy	"Bla Bla Bla"
19	HIM	Finland	"Join Me in Death"
20	Metallica	United States	"Nothing Else Matters (live)"

== 2001 ==
#	Artist	Nationality	Title
1	No Angels	Germany	"Daylight in Your Eyes"
2	Enya	Ireland	"Only Time"
3	Kylie Minogue	Australia	"Can't Get You Out of My Head"
4	Crazy Town	United States	"Butterfly"
5	Atomic Kitten	United Kingdom	"Whole Again"
6	Shaggy featuring Rayvon	Jamaica; Barbados	"Angel"
7	Safri Duo	Denmark	"Played-A-Live (The Bongo Song)"
8	Outkast	United States	"Ms. Jackson"
9	Uncle Kracker	United States	"Follow Me"
10	Gorillaz	United Kingdom	"Clint Eastwood"
11	Eminem featuring Dido	United States; United Kingdom	"Stan"
12	Alicia Keys	United States	"Fallin'"
13	Bro'Sis	Germany	"I Believe"
14	Dante Thomas featuring Pras	United States	"Miss California"
15	Christina Aguilera, Lil' Kim, Mýa, Pink & Missy Elliott	United States	"Lady Marmalade"
16	Wheatus	United States	"Teenage Dirtbag"
17	Sarah Connor	Germany	"From Sarah with Love"
18	Shaggy featuring RikRok	Jamaica; United Kingdom	"It Wasn't Me"
19	Gigi D'Agostino	Italy	"La Passion"
20	Sylver	Belgium	"Turn The Tide"

== 2002 ==
#	Artist	Nationality	Title
1	Las Ketchup	Spain	"The Ketchup Song (Aserejé)"
2	Shakira	Colombia	"Whenever, Wherever"
3	Herbert Grönemeyer	Germany	"Mensch"
4	Eminem	United States	"Without Me"
5	Las Kanzler/Die Gerd-Show	Germany	"Der Steuersong"
6	Ben featuring Gim	Germany	"Engel"
7	Tiziano Ferro	Italy	"Perdono"
8	Shakira	Colombia	"Underneath Your Clothes"
9	B3	United States	"I.O.I.O."
10	Wonderwall	Germany	"Just More"
11	No Angels	Germany	"Something About Us"
12	Bro'Sis	Germany	"I Believe"
13	Nickelback	Canada	"How You Remind Me"
14	Ozzy Osbourne	United Kingdom	"Dreamer"
15	Nelly featuring Kelly Rowland	United States	"Dilemma"
16	Pink	United States	"Get The Party Started"
17	Mad'House	France	"Like A Prayer"
18	Scooter	Germany	"Nessaja"
19	Groove Coverage	Germany	"Moonlight Shadow"
20	Robbie Williams & Nicole Kidman	United Kingdom; Australia/United States	"Somethin' Stupid"

== 2003 ==
#	Artist	Nationality	Title
1	Deutschland sucht den Superstar	Germany	"We Have a Dream"
2	Alexander Klaws	Germany	"Take Me Tonight"
3	Yvonne Catterfeld	Germany	"Für dich"
4	RZA featuring Xavier Naidoo	United States; Germany	"Ich kenne nichts (das so schön ist wie du)"
5	t.A.T.u.	Russia	"All The Things She Said"
6	Eminem	United States	"Lose Yourself"
7	Outlandish	Denmark	"Aïcha"
8	The Black Eyed Peas	United States	"Where Is The Love?"
9	Lumidee featuring Busta Rhymes & Fabolous	United States	"Never Leave You (Uh Oooh, Uh Oooh)"
10	The Rasmus	Finland	"In The Shadows"
11	Evanescence	United States	"Bring Me To Life"
12	Dido	United Kingdom	"White Flag"
13	Robbie Williams	United Kingdom	"Feel"
14	Alexander Klaws	Germany	"Free Like the Wind"
15	Sean Paul	Jamaica	"Get Busy"
16	Daniel Küblböck	Germany	"You Drive Me Crazy"
17	50 Cent	United States	"In Da Club"
18	Wolfsheim	Germany	"Kein Zurück"
19	Las Kanzler/Die Gerd Show	Germany	"Der Steuersong"
20	Shania Twain	Canada	"Ka-Ching!"

== 2004 ==
#	Artist	Nationality	Title
1	O-Zone	Republic of Moldova Romania	"Dragostea Din Tei"
2	De Randfichten	Germany	"Lebt denn dr alte Holzmichl noch?"
3	Usher featuring Ludacris & Lil Jon	United States	"Yeah!"
4	Eamon	United States	"Fuck It (I Don't Want You Back)"
5	Max Mutzke	Germany	"Can't Wait Until Tonight"
6	The Black Eyed Peas	United States	"Shut Up!"
7	Oomph!	Germany	"Augen auf!"
8	Aventura	United States	"Obsesión"
9	Haiducii	Romania	"Dragostea Din Tei"
10	Mario Winans featuring Enya & P. Diddy	United States; Ireland; United States	"I Don't Wanna Know"
11	Juli	Germany	"Perfekte Welle"
12	Eric Prydz	Sweden	"Call On Me"
13	Anastacia	United States	"Sick and Tired"
14	Michael Andrews featuring Gary Jules	United States	"Mad World"
15	Limp Bizkit	United States	"Behind Blue Eyes"
16	Blue Lagoon	Germany	"Break My Stride"
17	Anastacia	United States	"Left Outside Alone"
18	Stefan Raab featuring Kork, Spucky & Schrotty	Germany	"Space Taxi"
19	Kevin Lyttle	Saint Vincent and the Grenadines	"Turn Me On"
20	Britney Spears	United States	"Everytime"

== 2005 ==
#	Artist	Nationality	Title
1	Schnappi	Germany	"Schnappi, das kleine Krokodil"
2	Tokio Hotel	Germany	"Durch den Monsun"
3	Akon	United States	"Lonely"
4	K.Maro	Lebanon/Canada	"Femme Like U"
5	Söhne Mannheims	Germany	"Und wenn ein Lied"
6	Juanes	Colombia	"La Camisa Negra"
7	50 Cent featuring Olivia	United States	"Candy Shop"
8	Pussycat Dolls featuring Busta Rhymes	United States	"Don't Cha"
9	Die Firma	Germany	"Die Eine 2005"
10	Ch!pz	Netherlands	"Ch!pz in Black"
11	Fettes Brot	Germany	"Emanuela"
12	Melanie C	United Kingdom	"First Day of My Life"
13	Linkin Park/Jay-Z	United States	"Numb/Encore"
14	Nena	Germany	"Liebe ist"
15	Sarah Connor	Germany	"From Zero to Hero"
16	James Blunt	United Kingdom	"You're Beautiful"
17	Robbie Williams	United Kingdom	"Tripping"
18	Madonna	United States	"Hung Up"
19	Sugababes	United Kingdom	"Push The Button"
20	Joana Zimmer	Germany	"I Believe (Give a Little Bit...)"

== 2006 ==
#	Artist	Nationality	Title
1	Bob Sinclar presents Goleo VI featuring Gary Pine	France; Germany; Jamaica	"Love Generation"
2	Texas Lightning	Germany	"No No Never"
3	Shakira featuring Wyclef Jean	Colombia; Haiti	"Hips Don't Lie"
4	Gnarls Barkley	United States	"Crazy"
5	Sportfreunde Stiller	Germany	"'54, '74, '90, 2006"
6	Herbert Grönemeyer featuring Amadou & Mariam	Germany; Mali	"Zeit, dass sich was dreht"
7	Mattafix	United Kingdom	"Big City Life"
8	Silbermond	Germany	"Das Beste"
9	Eros Ramazzotti & Anastacia	Italy; United States	"I Belong to You (Il Ritmo della Passione)"
10	Xavier Naidoo	Germany	"Dieser Weg"
11	Madonna	United States	"Hung Up"
12	Nelly Furtado	Canada	"Maneater"
13	Tobias Regner	Germany	"I Still Burn"
14	Rihanna	Barbados	"Unfaithful"
15	Xavier Naidoo	Germany	"Danke"
16	Rosenstolz	Germany	"Ich bin ich (wir sind wir)"
17	Oliver Pocher	Germany	"Schwarz und weiß"
18	Scissor Sisters	United States	"I Don't Feel Like Dancin'"
19	Kelly Clarkson	United States	"Because of You"
20	Karmah	Italy	"Just Be Good To Me"

== 2007 ==
#	Artist	Nationality	Title
1	DJ Ötzi & Nik P.	Austria	"Ein Stern (...der deinen Namen trägt)"
2	Nelly Furtado	Canada	"All Good Things (Come to an End)"
3	Nelly Furtado	Canada	"Say It Right"
4	Ville Valo & Natalia Avelon	Finland; Poland/Germany	"Summer Wine"
5	Rihanna featuring Jay-Z	Barbados; United States	"Umbrella"
6	Ich + Ich	Germany	"Vom selben Stern"
7	Mark Medlock	Germany	"Now or Never"
8	Mark Medlock/Dieter Bohlen	Germany	"You Can Get It"
9	Monrose	Germany	"Shame"
10	Culcha Candela	Germany	"Hamma!"
11	Marquess	Germany	"Vayamos Compañeros"
12	Rihanna	Barbados	"Don't Stop the Music"
13	Pink	United States	"Dear Mr. President"
14	Timbaland featuring Nelly Furtado and Justin Timberlake	United States; Canada; United States	"Give It to Me"
15	Monrose	Germany	"Hot Summer"
16	Timbaland featuring Keri Hilson	United States	"The Way I Are"
17	James Blunt	United Kingdom	"1973"
18	Sunrise Avenue	Finland	"Fairytale Gone Bad"
19	Silbermond	Germany	"Das Beste"
20	Azad featuring Adel Tawil	Iran/Germany; Germany	"Prison Break Anthem (Ich glaub' an dich)"

== 2008 ==
#	Artist	Nationality	Title
1	Timbaland presents OneRepublic	United States	"Apologize"
2	Leona Lewis	United Kingdom	"Bleeding Love"
3	Kid Rock	United States	"All Summer Long"
4	Schnuffel	Germany	"Kuschel Song"
5	Katy Perry	United States	"I Kissed a Girl"
6	Duffy	United Kingdom	"Mercy"
7	Ich + Ich	Germany	"So soll es bleiben"
8	Amy Macdonald	United Kingdom	"This Is the Life"
9	Madonna featuring Justin Timberlake and Timbaland	United States	"4 Minutes"
10	Gabriella Cilmi	Australia	"Sweet About Me"
11	Stefanie Heinzmann	Switzerland	"My Man Is a Mean Man"
12	Ich + Ich	Germany	"Stark"
13	Polarkreis 18	Germany	"Allein, Allein"
14	Mark Ronson featuring Amy Winehouse	United Kingdom	"Valerie"
15	Thomas Godoj	Germany	"Love Is You"
16	Pink	United States	"So What"
17	Guru Josh Project	United Kingdom	"Infinity 2008"
18	Mark Medlock	Germany	"Summer Love"
19	Paul Potts	United Kingdom	"Nessun dorma"
20	Söhne Mannheims	Germany	"Das hat die Welt noch nicht gesehen"

== 2009 ==
#	Artist	Nationality	Title
1	Lady Gaga	United States	"Poker Face"
2	Emilíana Torrini	Iceland	"Jungle Drum"
3	Milow	Belgium	"Ayo Technology"
4	Cassandra Steen featuring Adel Tawil	Germany	"Stadt"
5	Mando Diao	Sweden	"Dance with Somebody"
6	Razorlight	United Kingdom; Sweden	"Wire to Wire"
7	Silbermond	Germany	"Irgendwas bleibt"
8	Gossip	United States	"Heavy Cross"
9	The Black Eyed Peas	United States	"I Gotta Feeling"
10	David Guetta featuring Kelly Rowland	France; United States	"When Love Takes Over"
11	Marit Larsen	Norway	"If a Song Could Get Me You"
12	James Morrison featuring Nelly Furtado	United Kingdom; Canada	"Broken Strings"
13	Katy Perry	United States	"Hot n Cold"
14	David Guetta featuring Akon	France; United States	"Sexy Bitch"
15	Polarkreis 18	Germany	"Allein, Allein"
16	Robbie Williams	United Kingdom	"Bodies"
17	Peter Fox	Germany	"Haus am See"
18	Beyoncé	United States	"Halo"
19	Daniel Schuhmacher	Germany	"Anything but Love"
20	Mark Medlock	Germany	"Mamacita"

== 2010 ==
#	Artist	Nationality	Title
1	Israel Kamakawiwoʻole	United States	"Over the Rainbow"
2	Shakira featuring Freshlyground	Colombia; South Africa	"Waka Waka (This Time for Africa)"
3	Lena	Germany	"Satellite"
4	Unheilig	Germany	"Geboren um zu leben"
5	Yolanda Be Cool & DCUP	Australia	"We No Speak Americano"
6	K'naan	Canada	"Wavin' Flag"
7	Stromae	Belgium	"Alors on danse"
8	Hurts	United Kingdom	"Wonderful Life"
9	Keri Hilson	United States	"I Like"
10	Kesha	United States	"Tik Tok"
11	Eminem featuring Rihanna	United States; Barbados	"Love the Way You Lie"
12	Madcon	Norway	"Glow"
13	Mehrzad Marashi	Germany	"Don't Believe"
14	Velile & Safri Duo	South Africa; Denmark	"Helele"
15	Edward Maya featuring Vika Jigulina	Romania	"Stereo Love"
16	Empire of the Sun	Australia	"We Are the People"
17	Lady Gaga	United States	"Bad Romance"
18	Rihanna	Barbados	"Only Girl (In the World)"
19	Lady Gaga	United States	"Alejandro"
20	Katy Perry featuring Snoop Dogg	United States	"California Gurls"

== 2011 ==
#	Artist	Nationality	Title
1	Jennifer Lopez featuring Pitbull	United States	"On the Floor"
2	Alexandra Stan	Romania	"Mr. Saxobeat"
3	Bruno Mars	United States	"Grenade"
4	Adele	United Kingdom	"Rolling in the Deep"
5	Pietro Lombardi	Germany	"Call My Name"
6	Marlon Roudette	United Kingdom	"New Age"
7	Snoop Dogg versus David Guetta	United States; France	"Sweat"
8	LMFAO featuring Lauren Bennett and GoonRock	United States; United Kingdom; United States	"Party Rock Anthem"
9	Pitbull featuring Ne-Yo, Afrojack and Nayer	United States; Netherlands; United States	"Give Me Everything"
10	Tim Bendzko	Germany	"Nur noch kurz die Welt retten"
11	Sunrise Avenue	Finland	"Hollywood Hills"
12	Lucenzo featuring Don Omar	Portugal; United States	"Danza Kuduro"
13	Rihanna featuring Calvin Harris	Barbados; United Kingdom	"We Found Love"
14	Caro Emerald	Netherlands	"A Night Like This"
15	Maroon 5 featuring Christina Aguilera	United States	"Moves like Jagger"
16	Adele	United Kingdom	"Set Fire to the Rain"
17	Lady Gaga	United States	"Born This Way"
18	Taio Cruz featuring Kylie Minogue	United Kingdom; Australia	"Higher"
19	Lana Del Rey	United States	"Video Games"
20	Jupiter Jones	Germany	"Still"

== 2012 ==
#	Artist	Nationality	Title
1	Michel Teló	Brazil	"Ai Se Eu Te Pego"
2	Die Toten Hosen	Germany	"Tage wie diese"
3	Lykke Li	Sweden	"I Follow Rivers"
4	Gotye featuring Kimbra	Belgium/Australia; New Zealand	"Somebody That I Used to Know"
5	Asaf Avidan & The Mojos (Wankelmut Remix)	Israel; Germany	"One Day / Reckoning Song"
6	Carly Rae Jepsen	Canada	"Call Me Maybe"
7	Rihanna	Barbados	"Diamonds"
8	PSY	South Korea	"Gangnam Style"
9	Loreen	Sweden	"Euphoria"
10	Olly Murs featuring Rizzle Kicks	United Kingdom	"Heart Skips a Beat"
11	Alex Clare	United Kingdom	"Too Close"
12	Sean Paul	Jamaica	"She Doesn't Mind"
13	Of Monsters and Men	Iceland	"Little Talks"
14	DJ Antoine featuring The Beat Shakers	Switzerland; Serbia	"Ma Chérie"
15	Flo Rida	United States	"Whistle"
16	Marteria, Yasha & Miss Platnum	Germany; Germany/Romania	"Lila Wolken"
17	Adele	United Kingdom	"Skyfall"
18	Tacabro	Italy	"Tacata'"
19	Cro	Germany	"Easy"
20	Linkin Park	United States	"Burn It Down"

== 2013 ==
#	Artist	Nationality	Title
1	Avicii featuring Aloe Blacc	Sweden; United States	"Wake Me Up"
2	Robin Thicke featuring T.I. and Pharrell Williams	United States	"Blurred Lines"
3	will.i.am featuring Britney Spears	United States	"Scream & Shout"
4	Daft Punk featuring Pharrell Williams	France; United States	"Get Lucky"
5	Passenger	United Kingdom	"Let Her Go"
6	Macklemore & Ryan Lewis featuring Ray Dalton	United States	"Can't Hold Us"
7	Macklemore & Ryan Lewis featuring Wanz	United States	"Thrift Shop"
8	Capital Cities	United States	"Safe and Sound"
9	Imagine Dragons	United States	"Radioactive"
10	Naughty Boy featuring Sam Smith	United Kingdom	"La La La"
11	James Arthur	United Kingdom	"Impossible"
12	Pink featuring Nate Ruess	United States	"Just Give Me a Reason"
13	Klingande	France	"Jubel"
14	The Script featuring will.i.am	Ireland; United States	"Hall of Fame"
15	Sido	Germany	"Bilder im Kopf"
16	Justin Timberlake	United States	"Mirrors"
17	Sportfreunde Stiller	Germany	"Applaus, Applaus"
18	Avicii featuring Dan Tyminski	Sweden; United States	"Hey Brother"
19	Icona Pop featuring Charli XCX	Sweden; United Kingdom	"I Love It"
20	Olly Murs	United Kingdom	"Dear Darlin'"

== 2014 ==
#	Artist	Nationality	Title
1	Helene Fischer	Germany	"Atemlos durch die Nacht"
2	Pharrell Williams	United States	"Happy"
3	Mr Probz	Netherlands	"Waves"
4	Andreas Bourani	Germany	"Auf uns"
5	Mark Forster featuring Sido	Germany	"Au revoir"
6	Lilly Wood and the Prick & Robin Schulz	France; Germany	"Prayer in C (Robin Schulz Remix)"
7	Clean Bandit featuring Jess Glynne	United Kingdom	"Rather Be"
8	Ed Sheeran	United Kingdom	"I See Fire"
9	Cro	Germany	"Traum"
10	OneRepublic	United States	"Love Runs Out"
11	Katy Perry featuring Juicy J	United States	"Dark Horse"
12	Meghan Trainor	United States	"All About That Bass"
13	Marlon Roudette	United Kingdom	"When the Beat Drops Out"
14	David Guetta featuring Sam Martin	France; United States	"Lovers on the Sun"
15	George Ezra	United Kingdom	"Budapest"
16	John Legend	United States	"All of Me"
17	Calvin Harris	United Kingdom	"Summer"
18	Nico & Vinz	Norway	"Am I Wrong"
19	Pitbull featuring Kesha	United States	"Timber"
20	Kiesza	Canada	"Hideaway"

== 2015 ==
#	Artist	Nationality	Title
1	OMI	Jamaica; Germany	"Cheerleader (Felix Jaehn Remix)"
2	Lost Frequencies	Belgium	"Are You with Me"
3	Felix Jaehn featuring Jasmine Thompson	Germany; United Kingdom	"Ain't Nobody (Loves Me Better)"
4	Ellie Goulding	United Kingdom	"Love Me Like You Do"
5	Major Lazer & DJ Snake featuring MØ	United States; France; Denmark	"Lean On"
6	Sido featuring Andreas Bourani	Germany	"Astronaut"
7	Adele	United Kingdom	"Hello"
8	Robin Schulz featuring Francesco Yates	Germany; Canada	"Sugar"
9	Wiz Khalifa featuring Charlie Puth	United States	"See You Again"
10	Kygo featuring Conrad Sewell	Norway; Australia	"Firestone"
11	Philipp Dittberner & Marv	Germany	"Wolke 4"
12	Namika	Germany	"Lieblingsmensch"
13	Sarah Connor	Germany	"Wie schön du bist"
14	Lost Frequencies featuring Janieck Devy	Belgium	"Reality"
15	Anna Naklab featuring Alle Farben & YOUNOTUS	Germany	"Supergirl"
16	Jason Derulo	United States	"Want to Want Me"
17	Gestört aber Geil featuring Wincent Weiss	Germany	"Unter meiner Haut"
18	Ed Sheeran	United Kingdom	"Photograph"
19	Robin Schulz featuring Ilsey	Germany; United States	"Headlights"
20	Kygo featuring Parson James	Norway	"Stole the Show"

== 2016 ==
#	Artist	Nationality	Title
1	Alan Walker	Norway	"Faded"
2	Stereoact featuring Kerstin Ott	Germany	"Die Immer Lacht"
3	Sia featuring Sean Paul	Australia; Jamaica	"Cheap Thrills"
4	Imany	France	"Don't Be So Shy"
5	Drake featuring Wizkid & Kyla	Canada; Nigeria; United Kingdom	"One Dance"
6	Kungs vs. Cookin' on 3 Burners	France; Australia	"This Girl"
7	The Chainsmokers featuring Daya	United States	"Don't Let Me Down"
8	Twenty One Pilots	United States	"Stressed Out"
9	Rag'n'Bone Man	United Kingdom	"Human"
10	Justin Timberlake	United States	"Can't Stop the Feeling"
11	Mike Posner	United States	"I Took a Pill in Ibiza"
12	Justin Bieber	Canada	"Love Yourself"
13	Jonas Blue featuring Dakota	United Kingdom	"Fast Car"
14	Disturbed	United States	"The Sound of Silence"
15	Major Lazer featuring Justin Bieber & featuring MØ	United States; Canada; Denmark	"Cold Water"
16	DJ Snake featuring Justin Bieber	France; Canada	"Let Me Love You"
17	Calvin Harris featuring Rihanna	United Kingdom; Barbados	"This Is What You Came For"
18	The Chainsmokers featuring Halsey	United States	"Closer"
19	G-Eazy x Bebe Rexha	United States	"Me, Myself & I"
20	Jennifer Lopez	United States	"Ain't Your Mama"

== 2017 ==
#	Artist	Nationality	Title
1	Ed Sheeran	United Kingdom	"Shape of You"
2	Luis Fonsi featuring Daddy Yankee	Puerto Rico	"Despacito"
3	The Chainsmokers and Coldplay	United States; United Kingdom	"Something Just Like This"
4	Imagine Dragons	United States	"Thunder"
5	Burak Yeter featuring Danelle Sandoval	Turkey/Netherlands; United States	"Tuesday"
6	Axwell Λ Ingrosso	Sweden	"More Than You Know"
7	Robin Schulz featuring James Blunt	Germany; United Kingdom	"OK"
8	Bausa	Germany	"Was du Liebe nennst"
9	French Montana featuring Swae Lee	United States	"Unforgettable"
10	Ed Sheeran	United Kingdom	"Galway Girl"
11	Jason Derulo featuring Nicki Minaj and Ty Dolla $ign	United States; Trinidad and Tobago	"Swalla"
12	Ed Sheeran	United Kingdom	"Perfect"
13	Kygo and Selena Gomez	Norway; United States	"It Ain't Me"
14	Alice Merton	Germany/Canada/United Kingdom	"No Roots"
15	J Balvin and Willy William	Colombia; France	"Mi Gente"
16	Jonas Blue featuring William Singe	United Kingdom; Australia	"Mama"
17	Bonez MC & RAF Camora featuring Maxwell	Germany	"Ohne mein Team"
18	Camila Cabello featuring Young Thug	Cuba; United States	"Havana"
19	Shawn Mendes	Canada	"There's Nothing Holdin' Me Back"
20	Jax Jones featuring Raye	United Kingdom	"You Don't Know Me"

== 2018 ==
#	Artist	Nationality	Title
1	Dynoro and Gigi D'Agostino	Lithuania; Italy	"In My Mind"
2	Ed Sheeran	United Kingdom	"Perfect"
3	Bausa	Germany	"Was du Liebe nennst"
4	Calvin Harris and Dua Lipa	United Kingdom; United Kingdom/Albania	"One Kiss"
5	Dennis Lloyd	Israel	"Nevermind"
6	El Profesor	Germany	"Bella ciao (Hugel Remix)"
7	Namika featuring Black M	Germany; France	"Je ne parle pas français (Beatgees Remix)"
8	Clean Bandit featuring Demi Lovato	United Kingdom; United States	"Solo"
9	Marshmello featuring Anne-Marie	United States; United Kingdom	"Friends"
10	Luis Fonsi and Demi Lovato	Puerto Rico; United States	"Échame la Culpa"
11	Olexesh featuring Edin	Germany	"Magisch"
12	Drake	Canada	"God's Plan"
13	Rudimental featuring Jess Glynne, Macklemore and Dan Caplen	United Kingdom; United States	"These Days"
14	Camila Cabello featuring Young Thug	Cuba; United States	"Havana"
15	Capital Bra featuring Ufo361	Germany	"Neymar"
16	Bonez MC & RAF Camora	Germany	"500 PS"
17	Eminem featuring Ed Sheeran	United States; United Kingdom	"River"
18	Summer Cem & Bausa	Germany	"Casanova"
19	Nico Santos	Germany	"Rooftop"
20	Loud Luxury featuring Brando	Canada; United States	"Body"

== 2019 ==
#	Artist	Nationality	Title
1	Lil Nas X	United States	"Old Town Road"
2	Tones and I	Australia	"Dance Monkey"
3	Apache 207	Germany	"Roller"
4	Juju featuring Henning May	Germany	"Vermissen"
5	Ava Max	United States	"Sweet but Psycho"
6	Billie Eilish	United States	"Bad Guy"
7	Shawn Mendes and Camila Cabello	Canada; Cuba	"Señorita"
8	Ed Sheeran and Justin Bieber	United Kingdom; Canada	"I Don't Care"
9	Capital Bra and Samra	Germany	"Tilidin"
10	Samra and Capital Bra	Germany	"Wieder Lila"
11	Daddy Yankee featuring Snow	Puerto Rico; Canada	"Con Calma"
12	Lewis Capaldi	United Kingdom	"Someone You Loved"
13	Meduza and Goodboys	Italy; United Kingdom	"Piece of Your Heart"
14	Capital Bra, Samra and Lea	Germany	"110"
15	Sarah Connor	Germany	"Vincent"
16	Lady Gaga and Bradley Cooper	United States	"Shallow"
17	Bonez MC & RAF Camora	Germany	"500 PS"
18	Mabel	United Kingdom	"Don't Call Me Up"
19	Dynoro and Gigi D'Agostino	Lithuania; Italy	"In My Mind"
20	Rammstein	Germany	"Deutschland"

== 2020 ==
#	Artist	Nationality	Title
1	The Weeknd	Canada	"Blinding Lights"
2	Tones and I	Australia	"Dance Monkey"
3	Apache 207	Germany	"Roller"
4	Saint Jhn	United States	"Roses"
5	Topic and A7S	Germany; Sweden	"Breaking Me"
6	Ufo361	Germany	"Emotions"
7	Jawsh 685 and Jason Derulo	New Zealand; United States	"Savage Love (Laxed - Siren Beat)"
8	DaBaby featuring Roddy Ricch	United States	"Rockstar"
9	Regard	Kosovo	"Ride It"
10	Apache 207	Germany	"Fame"
11	Nea	Sweden	"Some Say"
12	Pashanim	Germany	"Airwaves"
13	Apache 207	Germany	"Bläulich"
14	Robin Schulz featuring Alida	Germany; Norway	"In Your Eyes"
15	Mark Forster	Germany	"Übermorgen"
16	Vize and Tom Gregory	Germany; United Kingdom	"Never Let Me Down"
17	Ava Max	United States	"Kings & Queens"
18	24kGoldn featuring Iann Dior	United States	"Mood"
19	Dua Lipa	United Kingdom/Albania	"Don't Start Now"
20	Apache 207	Germany	"200 km/h"

== 2021 ==
#	Artist	Nationality	Title
1	Nathan Evans	United Kingdom	"Wellerman"
2	Ed Sheeran	United Kingdom	"Bad Habits"
3	Tiësto	Netherlands	"The Business"
4	Riton and Nightcrawlers featuring Mufasa & Hypeman	United Kingdom	"Friday"
5	The Weeknd	Canada	"Save Your Tears"
6	The Kid Laroi and Justin Bieber	Australia; Canada	"Stay"
7	Shouse	New Zealand; Australia	"Love Tonight"
8	ATB x Topic x A7S	Germany; Sweden	"Your Love (9PM)"
9	The Weeknd	Canada	"Blinding Lights"
10	Olivia Rodrigo	United States	"Good 4 U"
11	Bausa featuring Apache 207	Germany	"Madonna"
12	Joel Corry featuring MNEK	United Kingdom	"Head & Heart"
13	Lil Nas X	United States	"Montero (Call Me by Your Name)"
14	Måneskin	Italy	"Beggin'"
15	Masked Wolf	Greece/Australia	"Astronaut in the Ocean"
16	Pashanim	Germany	"Sommergewitter"
17	Montez	Germany	"Auf & ab"
18	Kasimir1441 featuring Badmómzjay and Wildbwoys	Germany	"Ohne dich"
19	Glass Animals	United Kingdom	"Heat Waves"
20	24kGoldn featuring Iann Dior	United States	"Mood"

== 2022 ==
#	Artist	Nationality	Title
1	DJ Robin & Schürze	Germany	"Layla"
2	Glass Animals	United Kingdom	"Heat Waves"
3	Luciano	Germany	"Beautiful Girl"
4	Gayle	United States	"ABCDEFU"
5	Ed Sheeran	United Kingdom	"Shivers"
6	Harry Styles	United Kingdom	"As It Was"
7	Lost Frequencies and Calum Scott	Belgium; United Kingdom	"Where Are You Now"
8	Miksu/Macloud & T-Low	Germany	"Sehnsucht"
9	Elton John & Dua Lipa	United Kingdom; United Kingdom/Albania	"Cold Heart"
10	Nina Chuba	Germany	"Wildberry Lillet"
11	Farruko	Puerto Rico	"Pepas"
12	Miksu/Macloud/Makko	Germany	"Nachts wach"
13	Tom Odell	United Kingdom	"Another Love"
14	Ed Sheeran	United Kingdom	"Bad Habits"
15	Ion Miles/Siraone/BHZ	Germany	"Powerade"
16	The Kid Laroi and Justin Bieber	Australia; Canada	"Stay"
17	Tiësto and Ava Max	Netherlands; United States	"The Motto"
18	Imagine Dragons x JID	United States	"Enemy"
19	Montez	Germany	"Auf & ab"
20	Acraze featuring Cherish	United States	"Do It to It"

== 2023 ==
#	Artist	Nationality	Title
1	Udo Lindenberg and Apache 207	Germany	"Komet"
2	Miley Cyrus	United States	"Flowers"
3	Ayliva featuring Mero	Germany; Germany/Turkey	"Sie weiß"
4	Nina Chuba	Germany	"Wildberry Lillet"
5	David Guetta & Bebe Rexha	France; United States	"I'm Good (Blue)"
6	Peter Fox featuring Inéz	Germany	"Zukunft Pink"
7	Miksu/Macloud/Makko	Germany	"Nachts wach"
8	Sira/Bausa/Badchieff	Germany	"9 bis 9"
9	Yung Yury & Damn Yury	Germany	"Tabu."
10	Tom Odell	United Kingdom	"Another Love"
11	Eminem	United States	"Mockingbird"
12	Ski Aggu, Joost and Otto Waalkes	Germany; Netherlands; Germany	"Friesenjung"
13	Luca-Dante Spadafora, Niklas Dee, Octavian	Germany	"Mädchen auf dem Pferd"
14	Apache 207	Germany	"Breaking Your Heart"
15	Nina Chuba	Germany	"Mangos mit Chili"
16	David Kushner	United States	"Daylight"
17	Tiësto	Netherlands	"Lay Low"
18	Taylor Swift	United States	"Anti-Hero"
19	Rema	Nigeria	"Calm Down"
20	Cassö, Raye and D-Block Europe	United Kingdom	"Prada"

== See also ==
- List of number-one hits (Germany)
