= German Music Authors' Prize =

German music award

The German Music Authors' Prize (German: Deutscher Musikautorenpreis) is a German music prize that has been awarded since 2009 by German collective rights association GEMA. It is awarded to composers and lyricists for their outstanding achievements. Under the motto "Authors honor authors" (Autoren ehren Autoren), the winners are chosen by an independent jury of composers, lyricists and producers from all genres. Amongst the ten categories awarded, only the Young Talents category comes with a monetary prize of 10,000 Euro.

== Recipients ==
=== 2009 ===
The ceremony took place on 28 May 2009 in Berlin, at the "axica" conference center.

- Composition Film music: Martin Böttcher
- Composition Pop/Rock: Peter Fox
- Lyrics Pop/Rock: Judith Holofernes
- Composition Independent: Niels Frevert
- Lyrics Hip-Hop: Die Fantastischen Vier
- Composition Music Theatre: Detlev Glanert
- Composition Symphonic: Manfred Trojahn
- Most Successful Work of the Year: Annette Humpe
- Young Talent Award: Kai-Uwe Kolkhorst
- Lifetime achievement: Peter Thomas

=== 2010 ===
The ceremony took place on 22 April 2010 in Berlin, at the "axica" conference center.

- Composition Dance: Alex Christensen
- Lyrics Schlager: Joachim Horn-Bernges
- Composition Pop/Rock: David Jost, Dave Roth, Pat Benzner
- Lyrics Pop/Rock: Jan Delay
- Composition Jazz: Nils Wogram
- Composition Instrumental music: Rebecca Saunders
- Composition Experimental music: Carola Bauckholt
- Most Successful Work of the Year: Silbermond
- Young Talent Award: Johannes Kreidler
- Lifetime achievement: Michael Kunze

=== 2011 ===
The ceremony took place on 14 April 2011 in Berlin, at the Ritz-Carlton Hotel.

- Composition Instrumental music: York Höller
- Composition Opera/Song: Aribert Reimann
- Composition Film music: Ulrich Reuter
- Composition Pop: Annette Humpe, Adel Tawil, Florian Fischer, Sebastian Kirchner (Ich + Ich)
- Composition Rock: Klaus Meine, Rudolf Schenker, Matthias Jabs (Scorpions)
- Lyrics Singer-songwriter/song: Reinhard Mey
- Lyrics Schlager/Volkstümliche Musik: Jutta Staudenmayer
- Most Successful Work of the Year: Der Graf, Henning Verlage (Unheilig)
- Young Talent Award: Alin Coen
- Lifetime achievement: Hans Werner Henze

=== 2012 ===
The ceremony took place on 24 May 2012 in Berlin, at the Ritz-Carlton Hotel.

- Composition Film music: Ralf Wengenmayr
- Lyrics Children's song: Gerhard Schöne
- Composition Jazz: Tied & Tickled Trio (Markus Acher, Micha Acher, Johannes Enders)
- Composition Experimental music: Georg Katzer
- Composition Religious music: Dieter Schnebel
- Lyrics Pop: Danny Dziuk
- Composition Rock: Cäthe (Catharina Sieland)
- Young Talent Award: Sarah Nemtsov
- Most Successful Work of the Year: Dieter Bohlen
- Lifetime achievement: James Last

=== 2013 ===
The ceremony took place on 25 April 2013 in Berlin, at the Ritz-Carlton Hotel.

- Composition Rock/Pop: Die Toten Hosen
- Composition Film music: Annette Focks
- Lyrics Pop: Stefan Stoppok
- Lyrics Hip-Hop: Deichkind
- Composition Symphonic: Jörg Widmann
- Composition Art song: Rainer Rubbert
- Composition Dance/Elektro: Yann Peifer & Manuel Reuter
- Young Talent Award: Torsten Goods & Jan Miserre
- Most Successful Work of the Year: Die Toten Hosen – Tage wie diese
- Lifetime achievement: Klaus Huber

=== 2014 ===
The ceremony took place on 8 May 2014 in Berlin, at the Ritz-Carlton Hotel.

- Composition Jazz: Efrat Alony
- Composition Film music: Martin Todsharow
- Composition Elektro: Robot Koch
- Composition Solo concert: Isabel Mundry
- Lyrics Vernacular: Kasalla
- Composition Contemporary choir music: Charlotte Seither
- Lyrics Pop/Rock: Bosse
- Young Talent Award: Marko Nikodijević
- Most Successful Work of the Year: Sportfreunde Stiller – Applaus, Applaus
- Lifetime achievement: Udo Jürgens

=== 2015 ===
The ceremony took place on 21 May 2015 in Berlin, at the Ritz-Carlton Hotel.

- Composition Pop: Tobias Kuhn
- Composition Hip-Hop: Farhot
- Composition Music Theatre: Helmut Oehring
- Composition Orchestra: Adriana Hölszky
- Composition Audiovisual media: Fabian Römer
- Lyrics Pop/Rock: Wolfgang Niedecken
- Lyrics Schlager: Heike Fransecky
- Young Talent Award: Sea + Air (Daniel Benjamin, Eleni Zafiriadou)
- Most Successful Work of the Year: Mark Forster, Sido, Ralf Christian Mayer, Daniel Nitt und Philipp Steinke – Au revoir
- Lifetime achievement: Helmut Lachenmann

=== 2016 ===
The ceremony took place on 12 May 2016 in Berlin, at the Ritz-Carlton Hotel.

- Composition Pop/Rock: Sonja Glass
- Composition Jazz/Crossover: Tini Thomsen
- Lyrics Hip-Hop: Marten Laciny (Marteria/Marsimoto)
- Composition Ensemble Music: Enno Poppe
- Composition Music with voice: Samir Odeh-Tamimi
- Composition Audiovisual media: Florian Tessloff
- Lyrics Singer-songwriter: Sven Regener (Element of Crime)
- Young Talent award: Jagoda Szmytka
- Most Successful Work of the Year: Andreas Bourani, Simon Müller-Lerch, Paul Neumann, Marek Pompetzki, Cecil Remmler, Paul Würdig – Astronaut
- Lifetime achievement: Martin Böttcher

=== 2017 ===
- Composition Audiovisual media: René Dohmen & Jumpel Dürbeck
- Composition Hip-Hop: The Krauts
- Composition Musik Für Musiktheater: Anno Schreier
- Composition Rock/Pop: Wallis Bird
- Composition Symphonic: Olga Neuwirth
- Text Schlager: Irma Holder
- Text Musikkabarett: Sebastian Krämer
- Most Successful Work of the Year: Kerstin Ott
- Young Talent award: Von Wegen Lisbeth
- Lifetime achievement: Sofia Gubaidulina

=== 2018 ===
- Composition Audiovisual media: Enis Rotthoff
- Composition Dance/Elektro: Martin Stimming
- Composition Voice Experiment: David Moss
- Composition Rock/Metal: Rammstein
- Composition Solo concert: Michael Pelzel
- Text Hip-Hop: Prinz Pi (Friedrich Kautz)
- Text Pop: Balbina Jagielska
- Young Talent award: Anna-Marlene Bicking, Kathrin A. Denner and Lina Maly
- Most Successful Work of the Year: Alice Merton and Nicolas Rebscher
- Lifetime achievement: Klaus Doldinger

=== 2019 ===
- Composition Audiovisual media: Ralf Wienrich
- Composition Choir music: Arvo Pärt
- Composition Ensemble with electronic: Michael Maierhof
- Composition Hip Hop: Christian Kalla (Crada)
- Composition Jazz/Crossover: Martin Tingvall
- Text Kinderlied: Suli Puschban
- Text Pop/Rock: Maxim Richarz
- Young Talent award: Elif Demirezer and Mark Barden
- Most Successful Work of the Year: Namika, Simon Triebel, Beatgees (around Hannes Büscher, David Vogt, Philip Böllhoff and Sipho Sililo), Simon Müller-Lerch (Sera Finale) and Alpha Diallo (Black M)
- Lifetime achievement: Wolfgang Rihm

=== 2020–2021 ===
- Ulrike Haage, Thees Uhlmann, Mine, Miland Petrozza, Johannes S. Sistermanns, International Music, Heiner Goebbels, Hannes Seidl, Haiyti
- Lifetime achievement: Bettina Wegner

=== 2022 ===
- Ami Warning, Ole Hübner, Chaya Czernowin, Dascha Dauenhauer, Grossstadtgeflüster, Julia Hülsmann, Lucry & Suena, Michael Holm, Zeynep Gedizlioğlu
- Lifetime achievement: Vinko Globokar

=== 2023 ===
- Volker Bertelmann (Hauschka), Jacob Jüngst (JACE), LUNA, Thomas Pigor, Cymin Samawatie and Ketan Bhatti (Trickster Orchestra).
- Lifetime achievement: Christian Bruhn

=== 2024 ===
- Annette Humpe, Kerstin Ott, Iris ter Schiphorst, Apache 207, Peter Fox, Udo Lindenberg, Moderat, Volker Rosin, Stickle and Rolf Zuckowski
- Lifetime achievement: Aribert Reimann

=== 2025 ===
- Die Toten Hosen, Paula Hartmann, AnnenMayKantereit, Robin Haefs, Unsuk Chin, Christina Kubisch und Berq
- Lifetime achievement: Wolf Biermann

=== 2026 ===
- Anna Mateur, Lisa Morgenstern with Karim Sebastian Elias, Benjamin Bazzazian with Apsilon, "Tau mich auf" (David Bonk alias DaJu and Jonas Kraft alias Cuffa) with Berken Dogan, Udo Lindenberg with Joachim Król, Julia Mihály with David Helbich, Thomas Taxus Beck with Norbert Trawöger, John Gürtler & Jan Miserre with Nora Fingscheidt, Dominik Hartz and Lauren Siess with The Bosshoss, Blond with Ikkimel (Johann Bonitz, Nina Kummer, Ikkimel and Lotta Kummer)
- Lifetime achievement: York Höller
