= Echo Music Prize =

German music award

- Awarded for: Outstanding achievements in the music industry
- Country: Germany
- Presented by: Deutsche Phono-Akademie
- First award: 18 May 1992; 34 years ago
- Final award: 12 April 2018
- Website: echopop-archiv.de

Television/radio coverage
- Network: Das Erste (2009–2016); VOX (2017–2018)

Echo Music Prize (stylised as ECHO, German pronunciation: [ˈɛço]) was an accolade by the Deutsche Phono-Akademie, an association of recording companies of Germany to recognize outstanding achievement in the music industry. The first ECHO Awards ceremony was held in 1992, and was set up to honor musical accomplishments by performers for the year 1991, succeeding the Deutscher Schallplattenpreis, which was awarded from 1963 to 2018. Each year's winner was determined by the previous year's sales. In April 2018, following controversy regarding that year's ceremony, the Bundesverband Musikindustrie announced the end of the award.

== History ==
First held with 370 people in the Flora, Cologne in 1992, the award ceremony in Frankfurt was televised and the classical awards were moved to a separate event, Echo Klassik, in Cologne in 1994. Until 1995, only invited guests could attend the ceremony. It was held in Munich, and in 2001, the venue was moved from Hamburg to Berlin because of subsidies of up to 20 million euros, although a return in 2004 was considered. In 2009, the venue in Berlin was moved to Mercedes-Benz Arena.

== Trophy ==
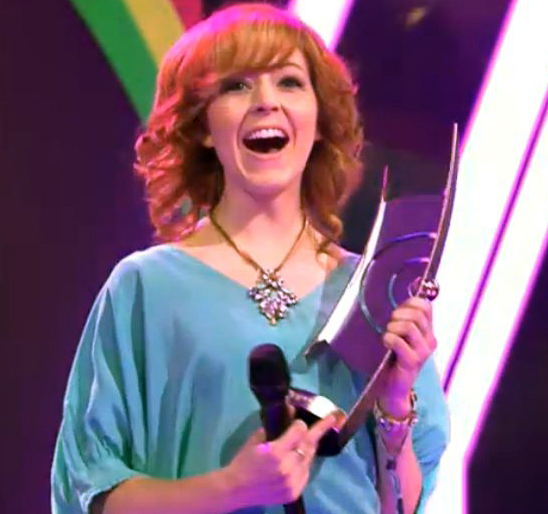
Lindsey Stirling receiving an Echo Award in 2014

The trophy was designed by Oliver Renelt when he was a student at the Hochschule für bildende Künste Hamburg. It is stainless steel, and is 40 centimetres (16 in) tall and weighs 2 kilograms (4.4 lb). It depicts half a disc with notes flowing into it from a globe, and the design was the winner of a competition held for that purpose.

== Controversy ==
The Echo Award was heavily criticized worldwide when Farid Bang and Kollegah received the award for best hip hop/urban album in April 2018. The nominated album, Jung, Brutal, Gutaussehend 3 (English: "Young, brutal, handsome 3"), contains the track "0815", in which the artists refer to their muscles as being more defined than those of Auschwitz inmates. The duo was even allowed to perform this track during the ceremony, despite heavy protests weeks before the award show.

Campino, singer of German punk band Die Toten Hosen, was the first one to criticize the committee's decision during the ceremony. His remarks received a standing ovation from the audience. Several artists later returned their Echo awards in protest, such as Marius Müller-Westernhagen, who returned all of his seven Echo awards received over the years. Other artists returning their awards were German conductors Christian Thielemann and Enoch zu Guttenberg, Russian-German pianist Igor Levit, record producer Klaus Voormann, and the Notos Quartett.

However, criticism did not only come from artists and the German press. Several businesses joined in, with Tom Enders, CEO of Airbus, being one of the most recent high-profile commentators, saying that this would hurt "Germany's international reputation". He also asked if "antisemitism [was] becoming acceptable in Germany" again.

As a consequence, the Echo Award was discontinued.

== Ceremony locations ==
Year	Venue	City	Presenter(s)
1992	Flora	Cologne	Kristiane Backer
1993	Wintergarten	Berlin	Susann Pingel
1994	Alte Oper	Frankfurt	Fritz Egner
1995	Bavaria Film- und Fernsehstudios	Munich	Reinhold Beckmann
1996	Congress Center Hamburg	Hamburg	Thomas Ohrner
1997	Congress Center Hamburg	Hamburg	Axel Bulthaupt
1998	Congress Center Hamburg	Hamburg	Axel Bulthaupt
1999	Congress Center Hamburg	Hamburg	Kim Fisher
2000	Congress Center Hamburg	Hamburg	Kim Fisher
2001	ICC Berlin	Berlin	Frauke Ludowig
2002	ICC Berlin	Berlin	Frauke Ludowig
2003	ICC Berlin	Berlin	Frauke Ludowig, Oliver Geissen
2004	ICC Berlin	Berlin	Oliver Geissen
2005	Estrel Convention Center	Berlin	Yvonne Catterfeld, Oliver Geissen
2006	Estrel Convention Center	Berlin	Michelle Hunziker, Oliver Geissen
2007	Palais am Berliner Funkturm	Berlin	Yvonne Catterfeld, Oliver Geissen
2008	ICC Berlin	Berlin	Nazan Eckes, Oliver Geissen
2009	O2 World	Berlin	Barbara Schöneberger, Oliver Pocher
2010	Palais am Berliner Funkturm	Berlin	Sabine Heinrich, Matthias Opdenhövel
2011	Palais am Berliner Funkturm	Berlin	Ina Müller, Joko Winterscheidt
2012	Palais am Berliner Funkturm	Berlin	Ina Müller, Barbara Schöneberger
2013	Palais am Berliner Funkturm	Berlin	Helene Fischer
2014	Messe Berlin	Berlin	Helene Fischer
2015	Messe Berlin	Berlin	Barbara Schöneberger
2016	Messe Berlin	Berlin	Barbara Schöneberger
2017	Messe Berlin	Berlin	Xavier Naidoo, Sasha
2018	Messe Berlin	Berlin	Amiaz Habtu

== Echo Awards ==
The Kastelruther Spatzen have won 13 Echo Awards in the category Volksmusik which is more than any other artist; the awards were in 1993, 1996–2003, 2006–2010.

Selected pop categories

=== Best National Rock/Pop Male Artist ===
- 1992: Herbert Grönemeyer
- 1993: Marius Müller-Westernhagen
- 1994: Herbert Grönemeyer
- 1995: Marius Müller-Westernhagen
- 1996: Mark'Oh
- 1997: Peter Maffay
- 1998: Nana
- 1999: Marius Müller-Westernhagen
- 2000: Xavier Naidoo
- 2001: Ayman
- 2002: Peter Maffay
- 2003: Herbert Grönemeyer
- 2004: Dick Brave
- 2005: Gentleman
- 2006: Xavier Naidoo
- 2007: Roger Cicero
- 2008: Herbert Grönemeyer
- 2009: Udo Lindenberg
- 2010: Xavier Naidoo
- 2011: David Garrett
- 2012: Udo Lindenberg
- 2013: David Garrett
- 2014: Tim Bendzko
- 2015: Herbert Grönemeyer
- 2016: Andreas Bourani
- 2017: Udo Lindenberg
- 2018: Mark Forster

=== Best National Rock/Pop Female Artist ===
- 1992: Pe Werner
- 1993: Sandra
- 1994: Doro
- 1995: Marusha
- 1996: Schwester S.
- 1997: Blümchen
- 1998: Sabrina Setlur
- 1999: Blümchen
- 2000: Sabrina Setlur
- 2001: Jeanette
- 2002: Sarah Connor
- 2003: Nena
- 2004: Yvonne Catterfeld
- 2005: Annett Louisan
- 2006: Christina Stürmer
- 2007: LaFee
- 2008: LaFee
- 2009: Stefanie Heinzmann
- 2010: Cassandra Steen
- 2011: Lena
- 2012: Ina Müller
- 2013: Ivy Quainoo
- 2014: Ina Müller
- 2015: Oonagh
- 2016: Sarah Connor
- 2017: Ina Müller
- 2018: Alice Merton

=== Best International Rock/Pop Male Artist ===
- 1992: Phil Collins
- 1993: Michael Jackson
- 1994: Meat Loaf
- 1995: Bryan Adams
- 1996: Vangelis
- 1997: Eros Ramazzotti
- 1998: Jon Bon Jovi
- 1999: Eros Ramazzotti
- 2000: Ricky Martin
- 2001: Carlos Santana
- 2002: Robbie Williams
- 2003: Robbie Williams
- 2004: Robbie Williams
- 2005: Robbie Williams
- 2006: Robbie Williams
- 2007: Robbie Williams
- 2008: James Blunt
- 2009: Paul Potts
- 2010: Robbie Williams
- 2011: Phil Collins
- 2012: Bruno Mars
- 2013: Robbie Williams
- 2014: Robbie Williams
- 2015: Ed Sheeran
- 2016: Ed Sheeran
- 2017: Rag'n'Bone Man
- 2018: Ed Sheeran

=== Best International Rock/Pop Female Artist ===
- 1992: Cher
- 1993: Annie Lennox
- 1994: Bonnie Tyler
- 1995: Mariah Carey
- 1996: Madonna
- 1997: Alanis Morissette
- 1998: Toni Braxton
- 1999: Celine Dion
- 2000: Cher
- 2001: Britney Spears
- 2002: Dido
- 2003: Shakira
- 2004: Shania Twain
- 2005: Anastacia
- 2006: Madonna
- 2007: Katie Melua
- 2008: Nelly Furtado
- 2009: Amy Winehouse
- 2010: Lady Gaga
- 2011: Amy Macdonald
- 2012: Adele
- 2013: Lana Del Rey
- 2014: Birdy
- 2015: Zaz
- 2016: Adele
- 2017: Sia
- 2018: P!nk

=== Best Schlager Female Artist ===
- 1993: Nicole

=== Best National Rock/Pop Group ===
- 1992: Scorpions
- 1993: Die Prinzen
- 1994: Die Toten Hosen
- 1995: Pur
- 1996: Pur
- 1997: Die Toten Hosen
- 1998: Tic Tac Toe
- 1999: Modern Talking
- 2000: Die Fantastischen Vier
- 2001: Pur
- 2002: No Angels
- 2003: Die Toten Hosen
- 2004: Pur
- 2005: Söhne Mannheims
- 2006: Wir sind Helden
- 2007: Rosenstolz
- 2008: Die Fantastischen Vier
- 2009: Ich + Ich
- 2010: Silbermond
- 2011: Ich + Ich
- 2012: Rosenstolz
- 2013: Die Toten Hosen
- 2014: The BossHoss
- 2015: Revolverheld
- 2016: Pur
- 2017: AnnenMayKantereit
- 2018: Milky Chance

=== Best International Rock/Pop Group ===
- 1992: Queen
- 1993: Genesis
- 1994: Ace of Base
- 1995: Pink Floyd
- 1996: The Kelly Family
- 1997: The Fugees
- 1998: Backstreet Boys
- 1999: Lighthouse Family
- 2000: Buena Vista Social Club and Ry Cooder
- 2001: Bon Jovi
- 2002: Linkin Park
- 2003: Red Hot Chili Peppers
- 2004: Evanescence
- 2005: Green Day
- 2006: Coldplay
- 2007: The Pussycat Dolls
- 2008: Linkin Park
- 2009: Coldplay
- 2010: Depeche Mode
- 2011: Take That
- 2012: Coldplay
- 2013: Mumford and Sons
- 2014: Depeche Mode
- 2015: Pink Floyd
- 2016: Coldplay
- 2017: Metallica
- 2018: Imagine Dragons

=== Best International Rock/Alternative ===
- 2001: Limp Bizkit (nominee: Blink-182, Kid Rock, Korn, Papa Roach )
- 2002: Linkin Park (nominee: Crazy Town, Gorillaz, HIM, Limp Bizkit)
- 2003: P.O.D. (nominee: Coldplay, Korn, Linkin Park, Puddle Of Mudd )
- 2004: Evanescence (nominee: Coldplay, Linkin Park, Metallica, The Rasmus )
- 2006: System of a Down (nominee: 3 Doors Down, Audioslave, Foo Fighters, Franz Ferdinand )
- 2007: Billy Talent (nominee: Bullet For My Valentine, Evanescence, Placebo, Tool )
- 2008: Nightwish (nominee: Foo Fighters, Kaiser Chiefs, Marilyn Manson, Within Temptation )
- 2009: AC/DC (nominee: 3 Doors Down, Metallica, R.E.M., Slipknot )
- 2010: Green Day (nominee: Billy Talent, Kings Of Leon, Mando Diao, Placebo )
- 2011: Linkin Park (nominee: Iron Maiden, Mando Diao, Thirty Seconds to Mars, Volbeat )
- 2012: Red Hot Chili Peppers: (nominee: Evanescence, Foo Fighters, Nickelback, Nightwish )
- 2013: Linkin Park (nominee: Billy Talent, Green Day, Muse, The Rolling Stones )
- 2014: Volbeat (nominee: Black Sabbath, Imagine Dragons, Placebo, Thirty Seconds to Mars )
- 2015: AC/DC (nominee: Foo Fighters, Linkin Park, Nickelback, Slipknot )
- 2016: Iron Maiden (nominee: AC/DC, Motörhead, Nightwish, Placebo )

=== Single of the Year ===
- 2005: O-Zone: "Dragostea din tei"
- 2006: Madonna: "Hung Up"
- 2007: Silbermond: "Das Beste"
- 2008: DJ Ötzi feat. Nik P.: "Ein Stern (...der deinen Namen trägt)"
- 2009: Kid Rock: "All Summer Long"
- 2010: Lady Gaga: "Poker Face"
- 2011 Israel Kamakawiwoʻole: "Over the Rainbow"
- 2012: Gotye feat. Kimbra: "Somebody That I Used to Know"
- 2013: Die Toten Hosen: "Tage wie diese"
- 2014: Avicii: "Wake Me Up"
- 2015: Helene Fischer: "Atemlos durch die Nacht"
- 2016: Lost Frequencies: "Are You with Me"
- 2017: Drake: "One Dance"
- 2018: Ed Sheeran: "Shape of You"

==== Single of the Year (National) ====
- 1993: Snap!: "Rhythm is a Dancer"
- 1994: Haddaway: "What is Love"
- 1995: Lucilectric: "Mädchen"
- 1996: Scatman John: "Scatman"
- 1997: Andrea Bocelli and Sarah Brightman: "Time to Say Goodbye"
- 1998: Tic Tac Toe: "Warum"
- 1999: Oli.P: "Flugzeuge im Bauch"
- 2000: Lou Bega: "Mambo No. 5"
- 2001: Anton feat. DJ Ötzi: Anton aus Tirol
- 2002: No Angels: Daylight in Your Eyes
- 2003: Herbert Grönemeyer: "Mensch"
- 2004: Deutschland sucht den Superstar: "We Have a Dream"

==== Single of the Year (International) ====
- 2001: Rednex: "The Spirit of the Hawk"
- 2002: Enya: "Only Time"
- 2003: Las Ketchup: "The Ketchup Song (Aserejé)"
- 2004: RZA feat. Xavier Naidoo: "Ich kenne nichts"

=== Album of the Year ===
- 2008: Herbert Grönemeyer: 12
- 2009: Amy Winehouse: Back to Black
- 2010: Peter Fox: Stadtaffe
- 2011: Unheilig: Große Freiheit
- 2012: Adele: 21
- 2013: Die Toten Hosen: Ballast der Republik
- 2014: Helene Fischer: Farbenspiel
- 2015: Helene Fischer: Farbenspiel
- 2016: Helene Fischer: Weihnachten
- 2017: Udo Lindenberg: Stärker als die Zeit
- 2018: Ed Sheeran: ÷

=== Best National Newcomer ===
- 1991: Pe Werner
- 1992: Die Fantastischen Vier
- 1993: Illegal 2001
- 1994: Six Was Nine
- 1996: Fettes Brot
- 1997: Fools Garden
- 1998: Nana
- 1999: Xavier Naidoo
- 2000: Sasha
- 2001: Ayman
- 2002: Seeed
- 2003: Wonderwall
- 2004: Wir sind Helden
- 2005: Silbermond
- 2006: Tokio Hotel
- 2007: LaFee
- 2008: Mark Medlock
- 2009: Thomas Godoj
- 2010: The Baseballs
- 2011: Lena
- 2012: Tim Bendzko
- 2013: Cro
- 2014: Adel Tawil
- 2015: Oonagh
- 2016: Joris
- 2017: AnnenMayKantereit
- 2018: Wincent Weiss

=== Best International Newcomer ===
- 1996: Alanis Morissette
- 1997: Spice Girls
- 1998: Hanson
- 1999: Eagle-Eye Cherry
- 2000: Bloodhound Gang [Nominee: Tarkan, Jennifer Lopez, Everlast, Britney Spears]
- 2001: Anastacia
- 2002: Alicia Keys
- 2003: Avril Lavigne
- 2004: The Rasmus
- 2005: Katie Melua
- 2006: James Blunt
- 2007: Billy Talent
- 2008: Mika
- 2009: Amy Macdonald
- 2010: Lady Gaga
- 2011: Hurts
- 2012: Caro Emerald
- 2013: Lana Del Rey (Nominee: Alex Clare, Emile Sande, Luca Hanni, Of Monsters And Men)
- 2014: Beatrice Egli
- 2015: The Common Linnets
- 2016: James Bay
- 2017: Rag'n'Bone Man
- 2018: Luis Fonsi

=== Honorary Award ===
- 1991: Udo Lindenberg
- 1992: Reinhard Mey
- 1993: Udo Jürgens
- 1994: James Last
- 1996: Klaus Doldinger
- 1997: Frank Farian
- 1998: Comedian Harmonists
- 1999: Falco
- 2000: Hildegard Knef
- 2001: Fritz Rau
- 2002: Caterina Valente
- 2003: Can
- 2004: Howard Carpendale
- 2005: Michael Kunze
- 2006: Peter Kraus
- 2007: Ralph Siegel
- 2008: Rolf Zuckowski
- 2009: Scorpions
- 2010: Peter Maffay
- 2011: Annette Humpe
- 2012: Wolfgang Niedecken
- 2013: Hannes Wader
- 2014: Yello
- 2015: Nana Mouskouri
- 2016: Puhdys
- 2017: Marius Müller-Westernhagen

== Echo Klassik ==
Following its first edition as a separate event in Cologne in 1994, the Echo Klassik has been held in the Semperoper in Dresden in 1996 and 2009, in Dortmund in 2003, in Gasteig in Munich from 2004 to 2008 and in 2014. In 2010 it was held in Essen. From 2011 until 2016 the award show was held in Berlin's Konzerthaus - only shortly intermitted in 2014. In 2017, the Echo Klassik took place in Hamburg's newly opened Elbphilharmonie.

== Echo Jazz ==
After 2010, the Echo Jazz awards were given in thirty categories, including ensemble of the year, male and female singer of the year, record label, and lifetime achievement. In 2012 the criteria for entry included album release date and "two outstanding reviews from music journalists." Conductor Claus Ogermann was given the ECHO Jazz Lifetime Achievement Award in 2012. Awards are decided by a twelve-member jury based on critical and commercial appeal.
