= Azad (rapper) =

German rapper of Kurdish descent

Azad ئازاد
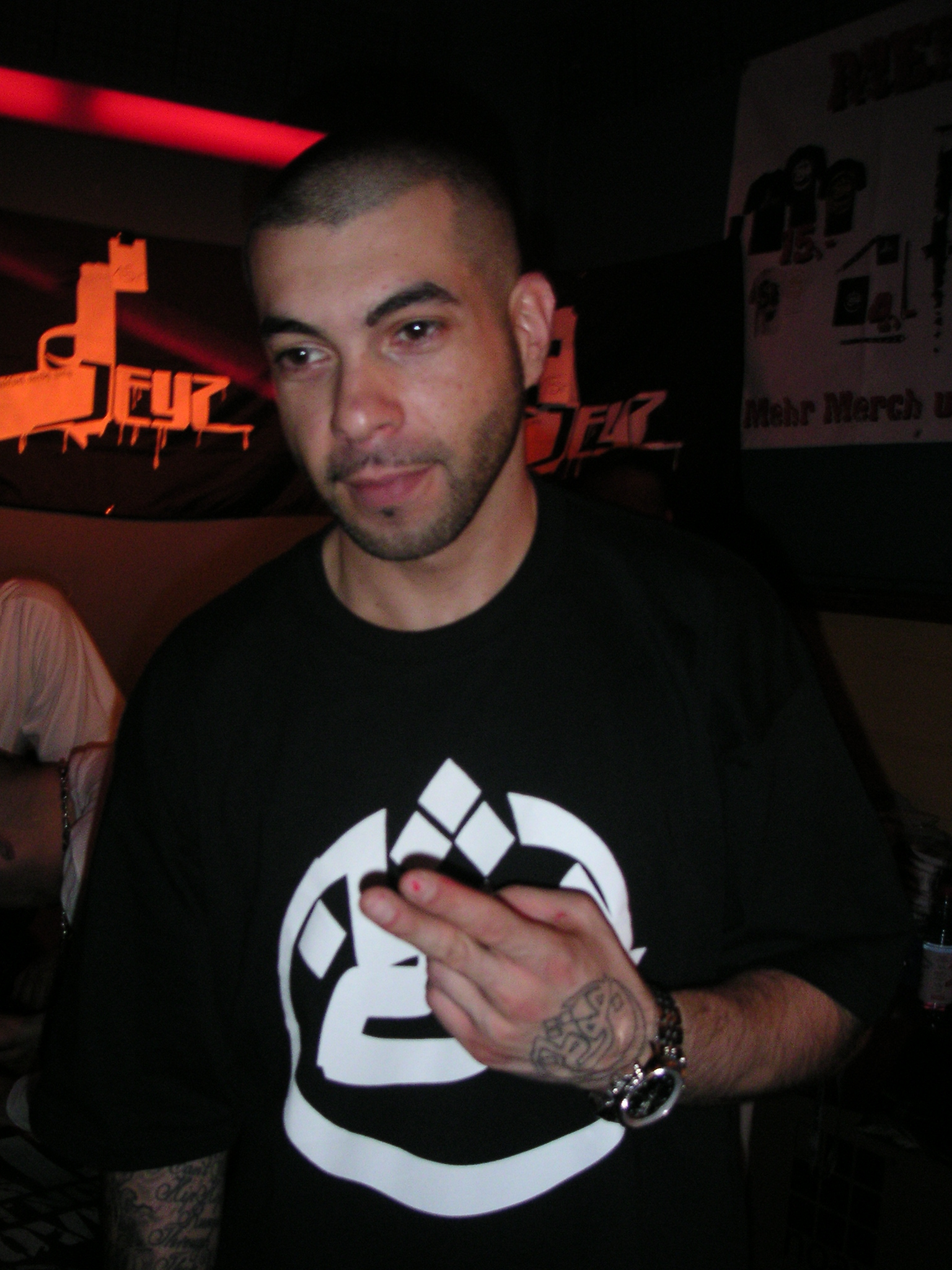
- Azad in 2006

Background information
- Born: Azad Azadpour; 24 November 1973 (age 52) (Pahlavi Iran) Sanandaj, Kurdistan Province, Imperial State of Iran
- Origin: Frankfurt, Germany
- Genres: German hip hop
- Occupation: Rapper
- Years active: 1988–present
- Label: Bozz Music
- Website: azad.de

Azad Azadpour (Sorani: ئازاد ئازادپوور, born 24 November 1973), known professionally by the mononym Azad, is a German rapper of Kurdish descent based in Frankfurt. As one of the first successful German street rappers, he had a strong influence on the German rap scene.

== Career ==
Azad's logo

After having arrived in Germany from Sanandaj in Iranian Kurdistan at the young age of 10, he was into hip hop, rap, beatboxing, and graffiti. In 1988, he joined D-Flame (Daniel Kretschmer), A-Bomb, and Combad in Cold-N-Locco. The group was renamed Asiatic Warriors in 1990 and mixed songs in German, English, Persian and Kurdish and achieved great fame through signing with Ruff'n'Raw Label and the EP Told Ya!. Internal differences between the band members resulted in the Asiatic Warriors breaking up.

In 1999, Azad signed as a solo artist with Pelham Power Productions. He became a sensation on the hip hop scene winning "Da Swing DJ Battle". The single "Napalm" followed by his self-produced solo album Leben and the follow-up album Faust des Nordwestens firmly established him as a successful artist and a cult figure.

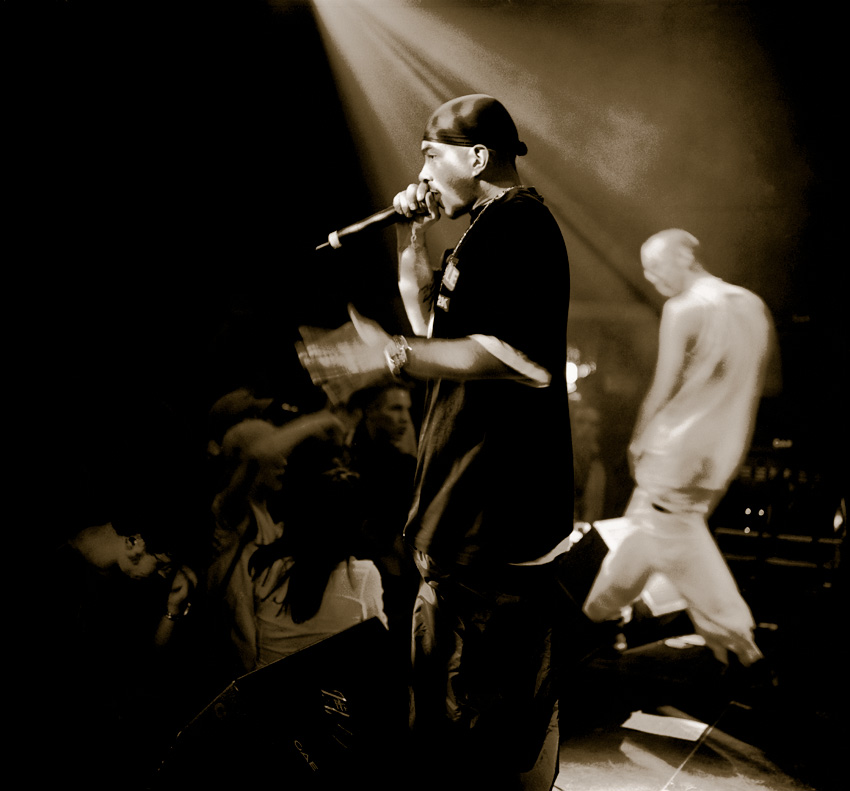
Azad performing in 2001

In 2004, Azad founded his own production company "Bozz Music", the urban music wing of Universal Music. He formed the group Warheit together with Sezai, Lunafrow, Jeyz, and Chaker. Soon, a rivalry erupted between Azad and Bozz Music label on the one side and Aggro Berlin label on the other. This put Azad even more in the spotlight as the rivalry escalated.

Azad released his third studio album Der Bozz in 2004, reaching the German Albums Top 10 and outselling his first two albums by far. However, the Federal Department for Media Harmful to Young Persons slammed the album as too violent and a "danger to youth".

Oddly enough, Azad's biggest commercial success was a joint effort with German rapper Kool Savas in One, released via BMG and hitting the top 5 on the German Albums Chart. Game Over, his fourth album, reached number 8. He has released further albums but with relative success (Blockschrift in 2007, Azphalt Inferno, and Assassin both in 2009)

He is also known for his collaborations with various artists like Belarusian rapper Seryoga.

Azad's German number 1 hit single is "Prison Break Anthem (Ich glaub' an dich)", featuring Adel Tawil of Ich + Ich. It is a German-language theme song for the popular American television series Prison Break broadcast with German voiceover on RTL.

The follow up to his debut Leben, Leben II, was released on 15 January 2016.

== Discography ==
=== Albums ===
Year	Title	Chart positions		
Year	Title	DE	AT	CH
2001	Leben	46	–	–
2003	Faust des Nordwestens	24	–	–
2004	Der Bozz	10	–	66
2005	One (with Kool Savas)	5	32	33
2006	Game Over	8	48	28
2007	Blockschrift	37	59	39
2009	Azphalt Inferno	24	55	29
2009	Assassin	31	52	27
2010	Azphalt Inferno II	18	50	19
2016	Leben II	1	5	4
2017	NXTLVL	3	9	5
2019	Der Bozz 2	2	19	3
2020	Goat	8	44	15

=== Singles ===
Year	Title	Chart positions			Album
Year	Title	DE	AT	CH	Album
2001	Napalm	–	–	–	Leben
2001	Gegen den Strom	–	–	–	Leben
2001	Leben	–	–	–	Leben
2003	A	65	–	–	Faust des Nordwestens
2003	Faust des Nordwestens	–	–	–	Faust des Nordwestens
2003	Mein Licht	–	–	–	Faust des Nordwestens
2004	Phoenix	65	–	–	Der Bozz
2004	Kopf hoch (feat. Jonesmann)	57	–	–	Der Bozz
2005	Signal (J-Luv feat. Azad)	52	–	–	Der Bozz
2005	Locked Up (Akon feat. Azad & Styles P.)	15	–	–	Trouble (Akon)
2005	Monstershit (with Kool Savas)	29	–	–	One
2005	All 4 One (with Kool Savas)	4	24	85	One
2006	Guck My Man (with Kool Savas)	27	–	–	One
2006	Alarm	48	–	–	Game Over
2006	Eines Tages (feat. Cassandra Steen)	28	–	–	Game Over
2006	2 Kaiser (with Seryoga)	85	–	–	Game Over
2007	Prison Break Anthem (Ich glaub' an dich) (feat. Adel Tawil)	1	12	13	Blockschrift
2007	Zeit zu verstehen (This Can't Be Everything) (feat. Gentleman)	30	72	–	Blockschrift
2008	Alles Lügen/ Ghettobass	74	–	–	Blockschrift
2008	On Top (with Kool Savas)	78	–	–	Tot oder Lebendig (Kool Savas)
2009	Klagelied (wie lang) (with Tino Oac)	92	–	–	Assassin
2010	Fly Away/Immer wenn es regnet (with Francisco & Kool Savas)	–	–	–	Azphalt Inferno 2
2012	Alle Mann (with J-Luv & DJ-Teddy-O)	–	–	–	
2015	Dreh' ab	92	–	–	Leben 2
2015	RAP (with MoTrip)	83	–	–	Leben 2
2016	Triumph (with Kool Savas, Sido & Adesse)	28	28	31	Essahdamus (Kool Savas)
2018	Hände an der 9 (with Olexesh)	94	–	–	Rolexesh (Olexesh)
2019	Dieser Weg	77	–	–	Der Bozz II
2020	Headshot	-	–	–	Goat
2020	Azzazzin	-	–	–	Goat
2020	My Eyes	-	–	–	Goat
2020	Zu wild (feat. Farid Bang)	79	–	–	Goat
