= Lieder (album) =

Studio album by Adel Tawil
- Released: November 7, 2013
- Genre: Pop
- Length: 51:36
- Label: Vertigo Berlin
- Producer: Tawil; Beatzarre; Robin Grubert; Andreas Herbig; Sebastian Kirchner; The Krauts; Tobias Kuhn; Konstantin Scherer

Adel Tawil chronology
Lieder (2013)	Lieder Live (2014)

Lieder (German: Songs) is the debut studio album by German singer Adel Tawil. It was released on November 7, 2013, by Vertigo Berlin.

== Track listing ==
Lieder – Standard edition
No.	Title	Writer(s)	Producer(s)	Length
1.	"Immer da"	Tawil; Beatzarre; Erika Nuri; Konstantin Scherer; Arezu Weitholz	Tawil; Beatzarre; Scherer	3:07
2.	"Wenn du liebst"	Tawil; Robin Grubert; Inga Humpe; David Jost; Joaquim Peerson; Ali Zuckowski	Grubert	3:44
3.	"Lieder"	Tawil; Sebastian Kirchner; Tobias Kuhn; Sebastian Wehlings	Tawil; Beatzarre; Andreas Herbig; Scherer; Kuhn	3:47
4.	"Weinen"	Tawil; Kirchner; Heike Kospach	Tawil; Herbig; Scherer	3:15
5.	"Unter Wasser"	Tawil; David Conen; Kirchner; Kospach; Malo Wesser	Tawil; Herbig; Scherer	4:43
6.	"Kartenhaus"	Tawil; Grubert; Simon Triebel; Zuckowski	Tawil; Grubert	3:22
7.	"Aschenflug" (featuring Prinz Pi & Sido)	Tawil; Beatzarre; Friedrich Kautz; Scherer; Paul Würdig	Beatzarre; Scherer	3:22
8.	"Zuhause" (featuring Matisyahu)	Tawil; Beatzarre; Jack Knight; Matisyahu; Scherer	Beatzarre; Scherer	3:39
9.	"Herzschrittmacher"	Tawil; Triebel; Zuckowski	Herbig	3:20
10.	"Graffiti Love" (featuring Humpe & Humpe)	Tawil; Dirk Berger; David Conen; Vincent von Schlippenbach; Mario Wesser	The Krauts	3:30
11.	"Auf Sand gebaut"	Tawil; Kautz; Siddharha Peghini	Tawil; Beatzarre; Scherer	3:38
12.	"Schnee"	Annette Humpe	Tawil; Beatzarre; Kirchner; Scherer	3:20
13.	"Dunkelheit" (featuring Jasmin Tawil)	Tawil; Kirchner; Kuhn; Jasmin Tawil; Wehlings	Tawil; Kirchner	4:25
14.	"Neujahr"	Tawil; Kirchner; Kuhn; Wehlings	Tawil; Kuhn	3:27

Lieder – Deluxe edition
No.	Title	Writer(s)	Producer(s)	Length
15.	"Paradies" (featuring Santiano)	Tawil; Beatzarre; Scherer; Weitholz	Tawil; Beatzarre; Scherer	2:49
16.	"Vermiss mich"	Tawil; Beatzarre; Scherer; Wehlings	Beatzarre; Scherer	3:45
17.	"Kater am Meer"	Tawil; Beatzarre; Scherer; Wesser	Beatzarre; Scherer	4:13
18.	"Niemals niemand"	Tawil; Kirchner; Kuhn; Wehlings	Tawil; Kuhn	3:43
19.	"Weinen" (Pelham & Haas-Remix)	Tawil; Kirchner; Kospach	Tawil; Herbig; Kuhn; Moses Pelham^{A]}; Martin Haas^{A]}	3:47
20.	"Kartenhaus" (Pelham & Haas-Remix)	Tawil; Grubert; Triebel; Zuckowski	Tawil; Grubert; Pelham^{A]}; Haas^{A]}	3:47

Notes

- ^{^[A]} denotes additional producer

== Charts ==
=== Weekly charts ===
Chart (2013)	Peak position
Austrian Albums (Ö3 Austria)	6
German Albums (Offizielle Top 100)	4
Swiss Albums (Schweizer Hitparade)	17

=== Year-end charts ===
Chart (2013)	Position
German Albums (Offizielle Top 100)	30
Chart (2014)	Position
Austrian Albums (Ö3 Austria)	29
German Albums (Offizielle Top 100)	19
Swiss Albums (Schweizer Hitparade)	80

== Certifications and sales ==
Region	Certification	Certified units/sales
Austria (IFPI Austria)	Platinum	15,000^{*}
Germany (BVMI)	5× Gold	500,000^{‡}
Switzerland (IFPI Switzerland)	Gold	10,000^{^}
^{*} Sales figures based on certification alone.^{^} Shipments figures based on certification alone.^{‡} Sales+streaming figures based on certification alone.
