= Umarme mich =

Single by Ich + Ich

from the album Ich + Ich
- Released: December 2, 2005
- Genre: Pop
- Length: 3:44 (single version); 4:47 (album version)
- Songwriter(s): Florian Fischer; Annette Humpe; Adel Tawil; Sebastian Kirchner

"Umarme mich" is a song by the German pop duo Ich + Ich and the fourth single released from their first album, Ich + Ich.

== Origin and artwork ==
The song was written and produced by Florian Fischer, Annette Humpe, Sebastian Kirchner and Adel Tawil. The single was mixed in the Berlin Tritonus Studios, under the direction of Olaf Opal and his assistant Oliver Zülch. The recordings took place in the Berlin-based recording studios Aquarium and Keller, under the direction of Fischer, Kirchner and Tawil. The song was released by the Polydor music label. On the cover, alongside the artist name and the song title, are Humpe and Tawil from Ich + Ich in faded colours.

== Release and production ==
The first release of "Umarme mich" was available to download from 29 November 2005. The publication of a physical single followed three days later on 2 December 2005, in Germany, Austria and Switzerland. As well as the single version of "Umarme mich", the maxi single contains two remixes of "Umarme mich" from Phil Fuldner and SONO, as well as the songs "Dienen" and "Ich hab Zeit" on the B-side. An exclusive EP was released on ITunes and contained another song on the B-side called "Nur jemand den ich kannte".

Live performances of "Umarme mich" on the radio or other sound broadcasting platforms happened only in Germany, Austria and Switzerland. The duo only performed the song live at their concerts.

== Content ==
The lyrics of "Umarme mich" were written in German by Humpe. The music was co-written by Fischer, Humpe, Kirchner and Tawil. The song is classified in the pop music genre.

The song is mainly sung by Tawil. Humpe is only heard in the background towards the end, repeating some of the lyrics. The song is about a person who works hard and has had a successful life and career, but their high position in the working world alone does not make this person happy. Only the feeling of being close to a certain partner makes the person happy.

== Music video ==
Like the group's two previous singles, "Du erinnerst mich an Liebe" and "Dienen", the music video is largely a comic animation. It begins with the everyday life of a small worker who has fallen in love with his colleague. His boss also has his eye on this employee. Ultimately, his boss wins the attention of the employee for himself and the video ends with a sex scene of the two. In between, Tawil can be seen in black and white on various screens] (computer, TV, etc.). As in the previous videos, there is also a small white dog to find in the video, offered at the cash register as a small cuddly toy. Humpe only appears very close towards the end at the side of Tawil. The length of the video is 3:50 minutes. It was directed by Alexander Gellner (animation), Rudi Dolezal and Hannes Rossacher.

== Contributions ==
=== Song production ===
- Florian Fischer: composer, music producer, sound editor
- Annette Humpe: backing singer, keyboard, composer, songwriter, music producer
- Adel Tawil: singer, composer, music producer, sound editor
- Sebastian Kirchner: composer, music producer, sound editor
- Olaf Opal: mixer
- Oliver Zülch: mixer

=== Music video ===
- Rudi Dolezal: director
- Alexander Gellner: director
- Hannes Rossacher: director

=== Companies ===
- Aquarium: recording studio
- George Glueck Publishing: publisher
- Keller: recording studio
- Polydor Records: record label
- Tritonus Studios: mixing
- Universal Music Publishing Group: publisher

== Chart and chart positions ==
"Umarme mich"
Germany	41	16 December 2005	9 wks
Austria	17	16 December 2005	19 wks

"Umarme mich" reached #41 in the singles charts in Germany and maintained that position for nine weeks. In Austria, the single reached #17 and held that position for 19 weeks.

This was the fourth chart success in Germany for Ich + Ich and the third in Austria. For Tawil, as a writer, this was his tenth chart success in Germany, and second in Austria. As a producer, it was his fifth chart success in Germany, and fourth in Austria. For Humpe, as a writer, "Umarme mich" was her 21st chart success in Germany, and her ninth in Austria. As a producer, it was her 24th chart success in Germany, and 13th in Austria.
