= Capital Bra videography =

Capital Bra video discography
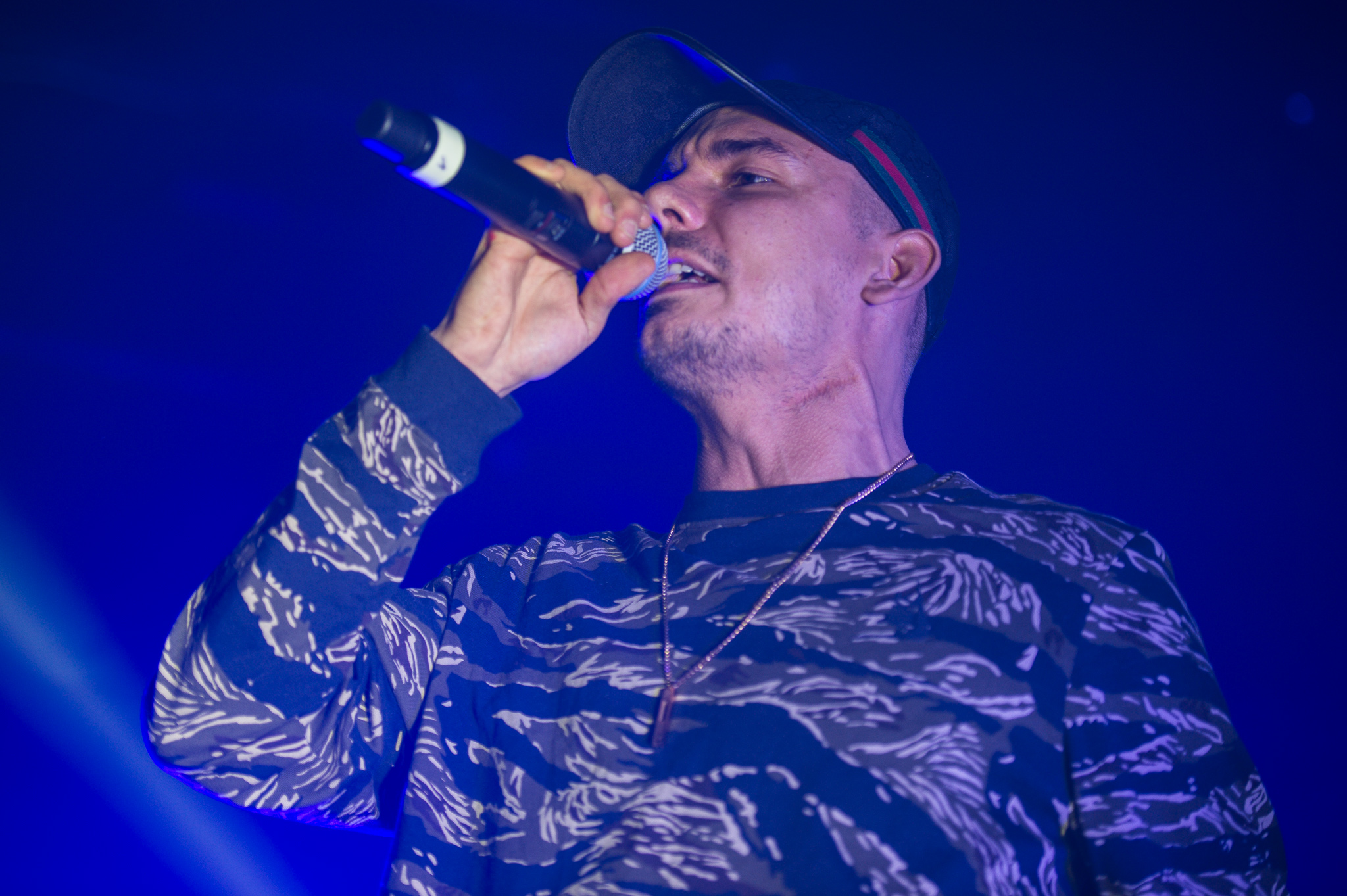
- Music videos: 30

German rapper Capital Bra has released one video album and more than 30 music videos.

== Video albums ==
List of video albums
Title	Album details
Tour Blog	Released: 22 June 2018; Label: Team Kuku, Sony Music; Formats: DVD

== Music videos ==
Title	Year	Other artist(s)	Director(s)	Ref.
As lead artist
"Augen auf"	2014	Bassam Khan	Jay	
"Columbia"	2014	None	Jay, Max	
"Kein Krieg in Ukraine"	2014	None	Jay	
"Bra"	2015	None	Fantastix Media Group	
"Bra macht die Uzi"	2015	None	Unknown	
"Kuku Habibi"	2016	King Khalil	Tahsin Özkan	
"Fluchtwagen glänzen"	2016	King Khalil	Unknown	
"Kreide"	2016	King Khalil	Ivan	
"Ich mach alles Kaputt"	2016	None	Unknown	
"Ala Ba Ba"	2016	Ufo361	Unknown	
"Es geht ums Geschäft"	2017	None	Smk–pro	
"Geld machen"	2017	King Khalil	Smk–pro	
"Die Echten"	2017	AK Ausserkontrolle	Smk–pro	
"Nur noch Gucci"	2017	None	Smk–pro	
"Ghetto Massari"	2017	None	Smk–pro	
"Kuku Sls"	2017	Gringo44	Smk–pro	
"Wer hoch fliegt fällt tief"	2017	None	Smk–pro	
"Zweistellige Haftstrafen"	2017	King Khalil	Unknown	
"5 Songs in einer Nacht"	2018	None	Fati.TV	
"Neymar"	2018	Ufo361	Fati.TV	
"One Night Stand"	2018	None	Fati.TV	
"Berlin lebt"	2018	None	Fati.TV	
"Melodien"	2018	Juju	Orkan Çe	
"Fight Club"	2018	Samra & AK Ausserkontrolle	Orkan Çe	
"Roli Glitzer Glitzer"	2018	Luciano & Eno	Orkan Çe	
"Allein"	2018	None	Sergen Isici	
"Ich liebe es"	2018	Xatar & Samy	Orkan Çe	
"Für Brüder"	2018	None	Capital Bra	
"irgend was anderes"	2018	None	Minuca Visión	
"RS6"	2018	None	Orkan Çe	
"Gekämpft"	2018	None	Capital Bra	
"Phantom"	2018	Noah	Unknown	
"heute gemacht"	2018	Noah	Unknown	
"Alles schmeckt gleich"	2018	None	Unknown	
"Ach Patrick Ach"	2018	None	Unknown	
"Prinzessa"	2019	None	Orkan Çe	
"Teuer"	2019	None	Prinz Pi	
"Khabib"	2019	Gringo, Kalazh44, Hasan.K	Orkan Çe	
"Capital Bra je m'appelle"	2019	None	Sergen Isici	
"Wir ticken"	2019	Samra	Orkan Çe	
"Tilidin"	2019	Samra	Heiko Hammer	
"Zombie"	2019	Samra	Heiko Hammer	
"Nummer 1"	2019	Samra	Heiko Hammer	

=== As featured artist ===
List of music videos as featured artist, showing directors
Title	Year	Director(s)
"Dealer aus Prinzip" (Ufo361 featuring Capital Bra)	2018	Kenny Cole, Max Hawk
"Unterwegs" (Bausa featuring Capital Bra)	2018	Adal Giorgis
"Power" (Ufo361 featuring Capital Bra)	2018	Unknown
"Chinchilla" (Summer Cem featuring Capital Bra & KC Rebell)	2018	Shaho Casado
"Für euch alle" (Bushido featuring Samra & Capital Bra)	2018	Orkan Çe
"Hubba Bubba" (Massiv featuring Capital Bra)	2018	J.S. Kuster
"Zinedine" (Xatar featuring Capital Bra)	2018	Daniel Zlotin
