= Prison Break Anthem (Ich glaub' an dich) =

Single by Azad feat. Adel Tawil

from the album Blockschrift
- Released: 2007
- Genre: German hip hop
- Label: Bozz Music

Azad feat. Adel Tawil singles chronology
"2 Kaiser" (2006)	"Prison Break Anthem (Ich glaub' an dich)" (2007)	"Zeit zu verstehen (This Can't Be Everything)" (2007)

"Prison Break Anthem (Ich glaub' an dich)" is a hit song by German hip-hop artist Azad and Adel Tawil, singer of Ich + Ich. It was released as the first single of Azad's album Blockschrift. It is the German title song of the American television series Prison Break.

== Background ==
The song showed the vastly different cultural influences that have transformed German hip-hop. Gone are the SNAP days of having the power, only to be replaced with a combination of Kurdish and mostly American influences.

In Timothy Brown's article, 'Keeping it Real' In a Different Hood, he points out the importance of American culture on German youth, "makes no bones about the influence on youth culture in Kreuzberg. 'Everything has to do with American movies," This devotion and respect of American culture proves how important this song is for Azad, as a musician, and how advanced hip-hop has become as a musical genre in Germany.

Azad's style owes immensely to American hip hop culture, Azad raps over the beat, while Adel Tawil hits the chorus, reminiscent of Snoop Dogg and Akon, or Notorious B.I.G. and R. Kelly.

== Influences ==
Azad obviously draws largely from the American hip-hop culture to produce the stylistics and flow that he employs. A bit more compelling is the amount of influence African-American hip hoppers have had on German hip hop. Two of Germany's founding rap groups, Die Fantastischen Vier and Advanced Chemistry swallowed up the hip hop craze when movies such as Wild Style and Beat Street dropped in the early 1980s. When the fad died down, the elements of the movement—questioning externally attributed identities and dealing with positions of disfranchisement in society—resonated with German youth. So much so that when groups started emulating American hip hop in search of their own, local sound, the clique "rap" indicators like screaming "hey yo" over a chorus were soon dismissed as mindless. It wasn't until this stage in the movement in Germany, that performers like Azad could arise, respectively embodying the confidence, presence, and seamlessness so reminiscent of American rappers like Notorious B.I.G. and Snoop Dogg.

== Music video ==
In the music video, Azad is seen rapping outside in a beautiful setting, baggy pants, tattooed arms, contrasting the lack of freedom inside the prison, but also paying homage, in the form of mimicry, to American hip-hop. Azad's song that accompanies the hit TV series Prison Break shows how far German hip-hop has come in its brief life span, but also shows how much it owes to American hip-hop and African-American culture.

== Charts ==
The song peaked at number 1 in the German Singles Chart also making it to number 12 in the Austrian charts and number 13 in the Swiss charts.

=== Weekly charts ===
Chart (2007)	Peak position
Austria (Ö3 Austria Top 40)	12
Germany (GfK)	1
Switzerland (Schweizer Hitparade)	13

=== Year-end charts ===
Chart (2007)	Position
Austria (Ö3 Austria Top 40)	57
Germany (Official German Charts)	20
Switzerland (Schweizer Hitparade)	63

== Certifications ==
Region	Certification	Certified units/sales
Germany (BVMI)	Gold	150,000^{^}
^{^} Shipments figures based on certification alone.
