= Jonesmann =

- Born: Samson Jones
- Origin: Frankfurt, West Germany
- Genres: German hip hop
- Labels: Echte Musik, Intergroove

Samson Jones, better known as Jonesmann, is a German rapper. He was born in Frankfurt to an African American father and a German mother. He was signed to Azad's label Bozz Music and Sony BMG. Now he is signed to his own label 'Echte Musik'.

== Biography ==
Jonesmann was introduced to Azad and Jeyz by D-Flame in 1992, and founded the crew "Chabs" with Jeyz and Chan in 1994. They were fairly successful and were produced among others by Roey Marquis II. The group disbanded in 2001 because the members wanted to focus on their respective solo careers. In the following year, Jonesmann was featured on releases by Roey Marquis II, Olli Banjo, Jack Orsen, and Azad.

His first solo release was the Best of Mixtape in 2003. One year later, Jonesmann produced a 7 track EP called "Gesucht, Gefunden" together with Pal One, where he first attempted to sing, instead of only rap. In the same year, Jonesmann was signed by Bozz Music and was featured on the sampler BOZZ Music Vol. 1. After another mixtape at the end of 2004, "Macht, Käse, Flows, Cash" (Power, Cheese, Flows, Cash), his first solo album, S.J., and one more mixtape were released in mid-2006.

== Discography ==
Albums

- 2002 — Basline wie Wrap, Blunts un Weed («Basline like Wrap, Blunts and Weed»)
- 2006 — S.J.
- 2008 — Echte Musik («Real Music»)
- 2016 — Angekommen («Arrived»)
- 2017 — Schmetterling («Butterfly»)

Collaboration albums

- 2004 — Gesucht & Gefunden (with Pal One) («Searched for & Found»)
- 2009 — 4 Fäuste für ein Halleluja (with Olli Banjo) («4 Fists for a Hallelujah»)

Mixtapes

- 2003 — Best of Jonesmann
- 2005 — Macht, Käse, Flows, Cash («Power, Cheese, Flows, Cash»)
- 2006 — In dein Mund («In your mouth»)

EPs

- 2010 — Sehnsucht

Singles

- 2001 — Chabs - Kern der Wunden («Chabs - Core of the wounds»)
- 2004 — Kopf hoch (with Azad)
- 2006 — Bis der letzte fällt / Fick dich («Until the last one drops / Fuck you»)
- 2006 — Nenn mich Jones («Call me Jones»)
- 2009 — Vögel (with Olli Banjo) («Birds»)
- 2009 — Mehr Tränen (with Olli Banjo and Curse)

Other

- 2004 — Bozz Musiker (with STI and Jeyz - Juice Exclusive CD #49)
- 2006 — Ihr wollt das Album! (with Olli Banjo; Juice Exclusive CD #71) («You want the album!»)
- 2007 — Südberliner (with Jasha - Juice Exclusive CD #76)
- 2007 — Das ist echt (with Jeyz & Criz - Juice Exclusive CD #80)
- 2008 — Auszeit (Juice Exclusive CD #83)
- 2008 — Ich kann sie fühlen (with Blaze - Juice CD #86)
- 2008 — Von früher bis jetzt (with Blaze - Juice CD #89)
- 2008 — Jeder Weg hat sein Ende (with Yassir - Juice CD #93)
- 2009 — Mehr Tränen (Allstar Remix) (Freetrack)
- 2009 — Spiel mit dem Feuer (with Blaze, Criz and Haftbefehl) (Juice Exclusive! in Juice-CD #99)
- 2009 — Duck dich (with Blaze, Criz and Haftbefehl) (Juice Exclusive! in Juice-CD #100)
- 2009 — Das Verhör (Juice-Remix) (with Azad, Freeman and Savant des Rimes) (Juice-Exclusive! in Juice-CD #103)
- 2010 — Nur ein Fick (with Moe Phoenix, Freetrack)
- 2011 — Wir bleiben zusammen (Ein Fall für Zwei DJ Sweap (Künstler), DJ Pfund 500 (Künstler)
- 2011 — Neuer Sound (Ein Fall für Zwei DJ Sweap (Künstler), DJ Pfund 500 (Künstler) (feat. Haftbefehl)
- 2011 — Ja genau (Ein Fall für Zwei DJ Sweap (Künstler), DJ Pfund 500 (Künstler) (feat. Blaze)
- 2011 — Mein größter Fan (with Montez — at the Album Karneval)
