= Wonderwall (disambiguation) =

"Wonderwall" is a 1995 song by Oasis.

Wonderwall may also refer to:

- Wonderwall (film), a 1968 psychedelic film by Joe Massot
  - Wonderwall Music, the film's soundtrack, and first solo album by George Harrison
- The Wonderwall, an attraction at the 1984 Louisiana World Exposition held in New Orleans
- The Wonderwall, game show bonus round first seen in the 1999 British lottery series Winning Lines
- Wonderwall (band), a 2001 German pop group
