= Charlotte Seither =

German classical composer (born 1965)

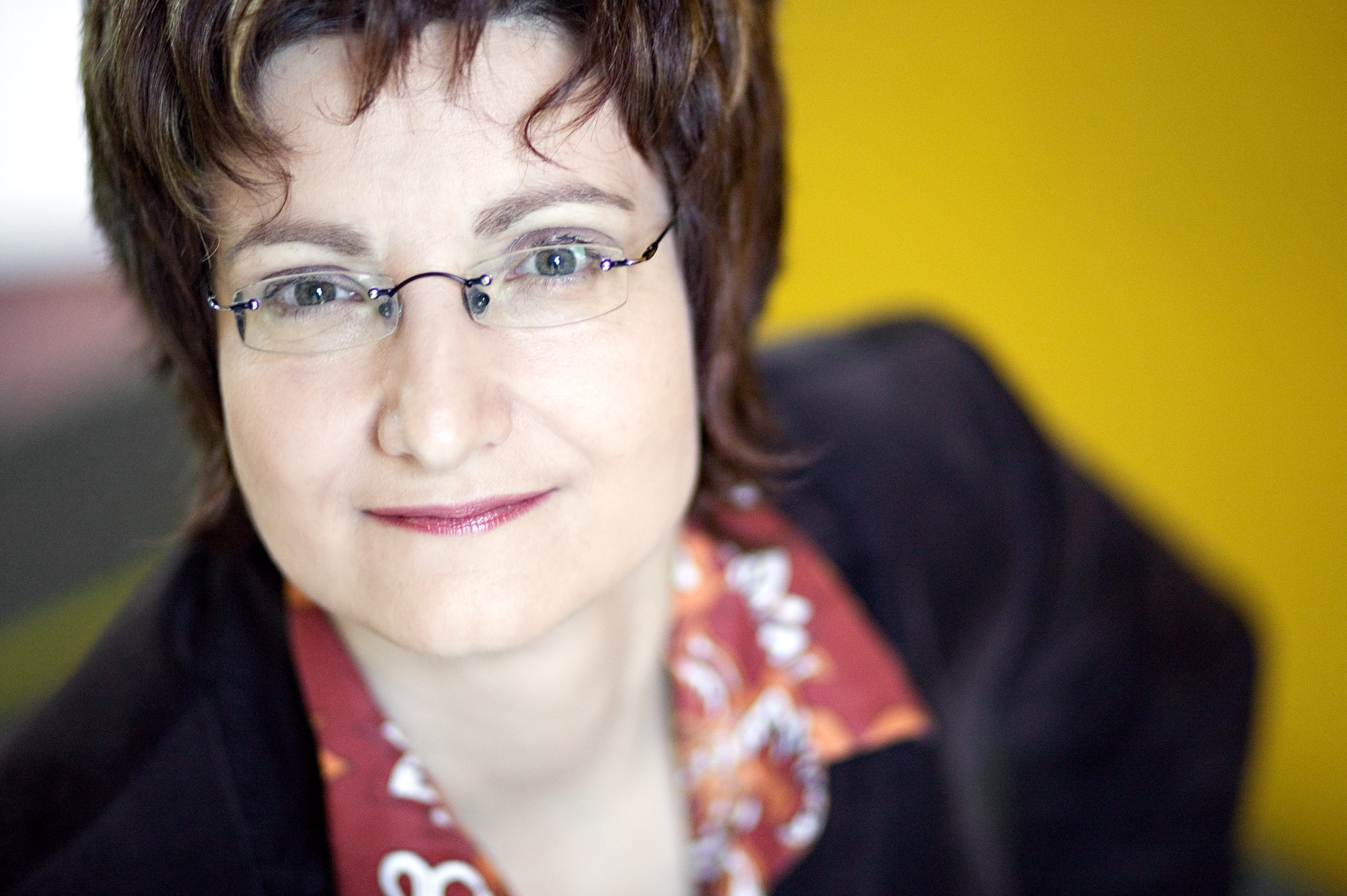
Charlotte Seither

Charlotte Seither (born 1965) is a German classical composer, pianist and music educator. She has composed a wide range of orchestral, chamber and choral music, winning many awards including the 2014 German Music Authors' Prize for contemporary choral composition. Her works have been performed across Europe, in Asia and in the Americas.

== Biography ==
Born in Landau on 31 August 1965, Seither studied piano, German language and musicology in Hanover and Berlin under Frank-Michael Beyer, Friedrich Goldmann and Aribert Reimann, earning a doctorate in 1998.

In 1994, she won first prize at the Göttingen Composition Contest and the following year she became the first German to win first prize at the Prague Spring International Composition Contest. Her works have been performed by the BBC Symphony Orchestra and the Ensemble Modern. She has been a participant at the Warsaw Generation Festival, Gaudeamus Amsterdam and the BBC Proms. In 2010, she received Lower Saxony's Praetorius Music Prize and in 2014, the German Music Authors' Prize for contemporary choral composition.
