= Asiatic Warriors =

German hardcore rap crew

Asiatic Warriors, originally named Cold-N-Loco, were a multilingual hardcore rap crew from Frankfurt, Germany.

Cold-N-Loco was composed of German rapper D-Flame (Daniel Kretschmer), 2 Turkish DJs & producers A-Bomb (Adnan Öztürk) and Combad (Taner Ali Şen). They invited the Kurdish hip hop artist Azad to join the band and it was renamed Asiatic Warriors. It delivered a mix of German, English, and Turkish lyrics along with hard beats.

After the split, D-Flame and Azad went on for solo careers. D-Flame later worked with Combad and A-Bomb for his second solo album 'Daniel X' in 2002.

== Discography ==
- 1994: Told Ya (Dragnet/Sony)
- 1997: Strength (We don't play records/EFA)
