= Pe Werner =

German singer (born 1960)

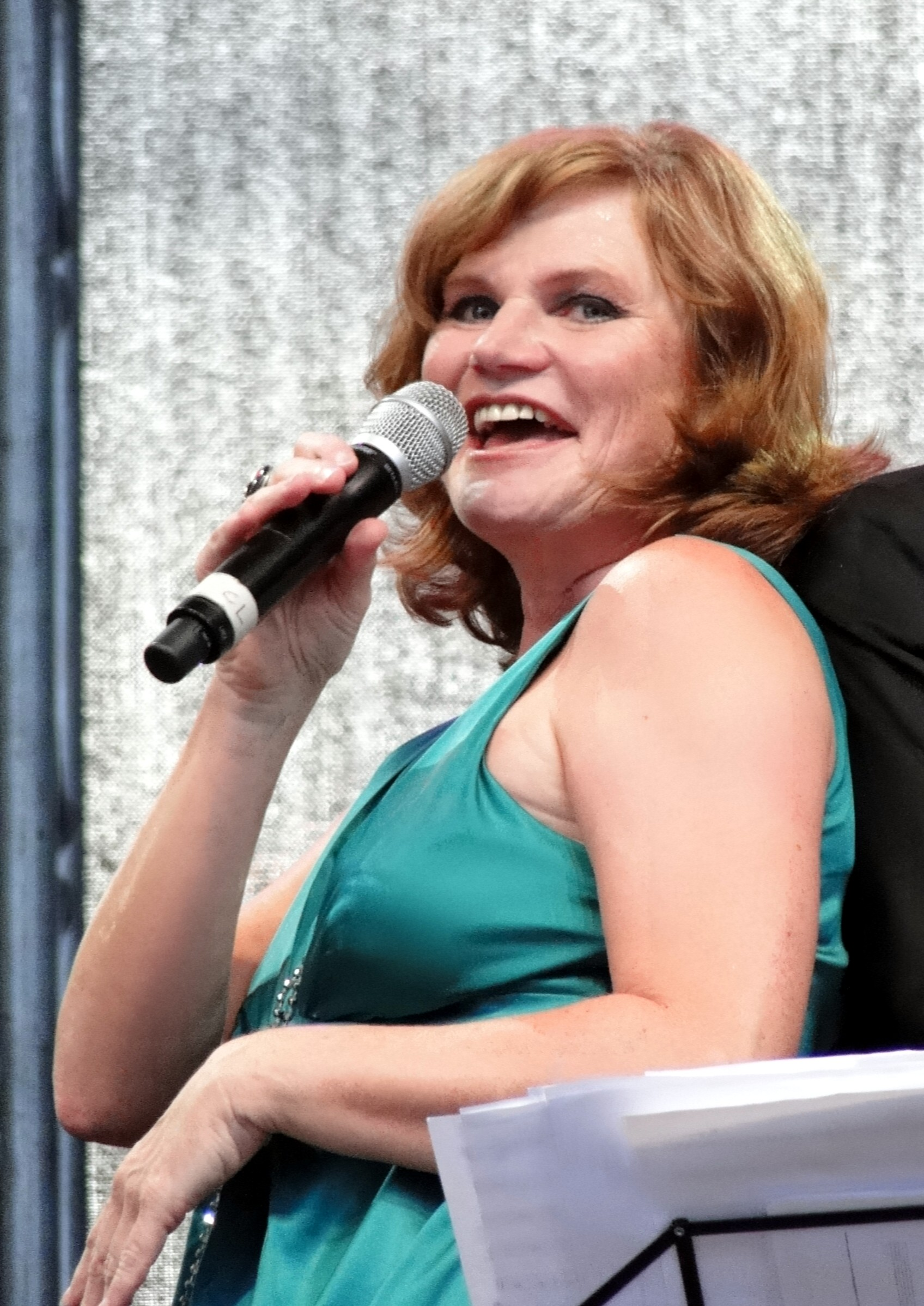
Pe Werner in August 2010

Pe Werner (born October 13, 1960 in Heidelberg) is a German singer.

== Life ==
Werner is a popular singer in Germany. She sings songs in the German language.

== Awards ==
- 1991 Preis der deutschen Schallplattenkritik
- 1992 Echo
- 1992 Fred-Jay-Award
- 1992 RSH-Gold
- 1993 Goldene Schallplatte for song Kribbeln im Bauch
- 1994 RSH-Gold
- 1995 Goldene Stimmgabel
- 2002 Lale Andersen Award
- 2011 Goldene Schallplatte for song Im Mondrausch
