= Kerstin Ott =

German musician

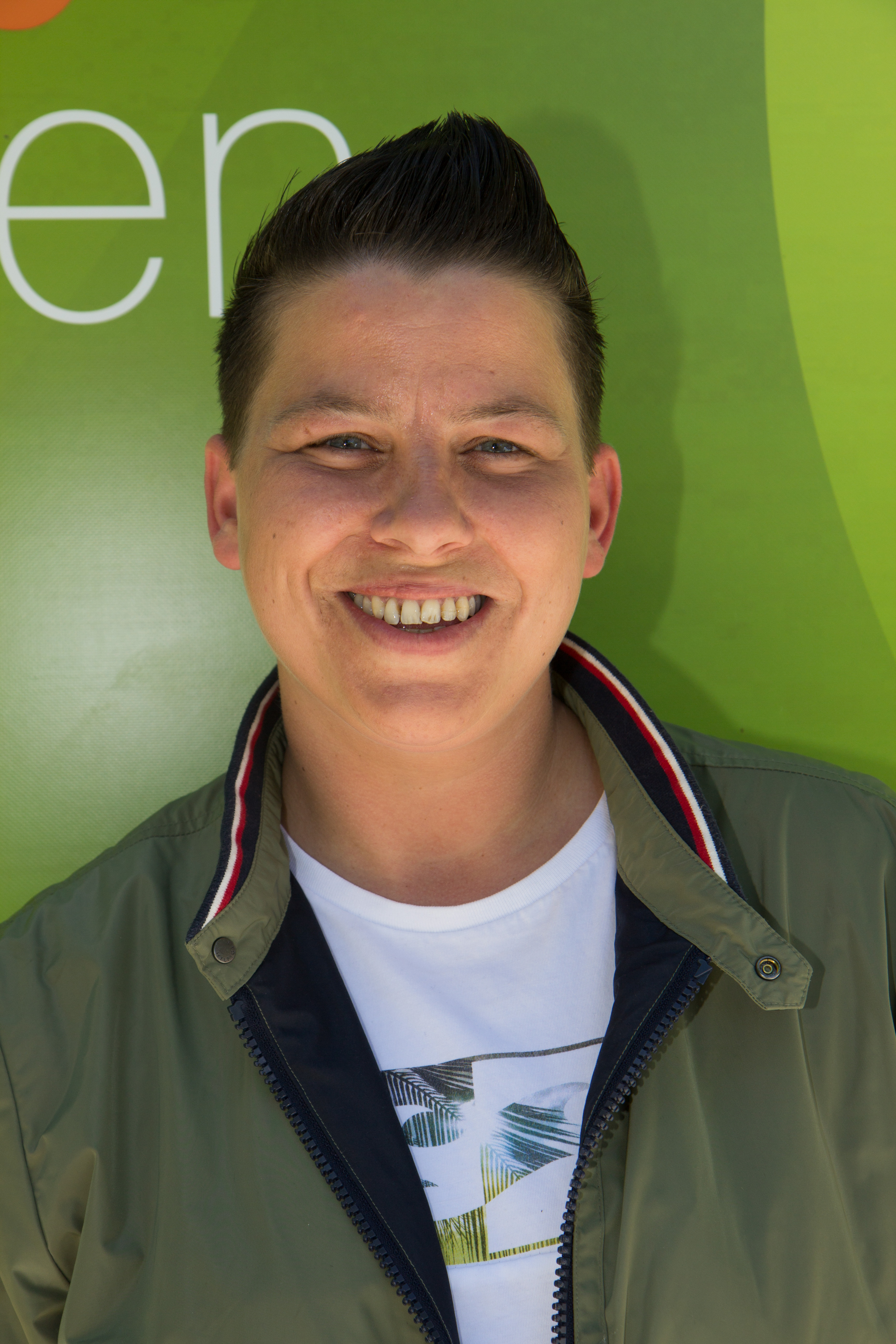
- Ott in 2018
- Born: 17 January 1982 (age 44); West Berlin, West Germany
- Occupations: Singer, songwriter, guitarist and DJ

Kerstin Ott (born 17 January 1982 in West Berlin) is a German singer, songwriter, guitarist and DJ. She became known through the song "Die immer lacht" (English: She who always laughs), which was re-mixed by the German DJ and producer team Stereoact. In January 2016, the song was at the top of the German and Austrian singles charts, and also reached the Swiss charts.

== Career ==
Kerstin Ott recorded the song as a hobby musician around 2005. According to her own account, she had written "Die immer lacht" in only five minutes at the kitchen table for a friend who was ill at the time. The song is about a woman who always laughs outwardly. The narrator takes her by the hand and teaches her to show her true feelings to others.

Ott, who also works as a DJ, then gave away some self-burned CDs of the song, which was set by one of the receiver on YouTube and years later discovered by Stereoact and was published on Kontor Records as a remix. "Die immer lacht" was officially declared the most successful work of 2016 by the market research company GfK Entertainment in March 2017 and was awarded the German Music Authors' Prize. Die immer lacht climbed to second place in Germany (Official German Charts) and Austria (Ö3 Austria Top 40) and remained in the Top 10 for several months. To date, "Die immer lacht" has received over 125 million YouTube views and sold more than one million copies, earning it diamond status in Germany and platinum in Austria. It is among the best-selling singles in Germany since 1975. The song was made the new club anthem by the Berlin-based football club Hertha BSC. In the official video for the song, shot in Mallorca, Ott plays a photographer, who photographs a constantly smiling model (Greta Hirsch).

== Personal life ==
Kerstin Ott has lived in Heide, Holstein since she was a child. She participated in talent competitions in her childhood, and sang in the choir of Rolf Zuckowski. She also appeared as a DJ. Ott trained and worked as a painter until the breakthrough of Die immer lacht. At the beginning of 2016, she toured the German-speaking countries.

Ott came out as lesbian at the age of 17. In August 2017 she entered into a registered partnership with her longtime girlfriend Karolina Köppen, which was rewritten as a marriage in October 2017. Köppen and her two children adopted Ott's surname.

== Discography ==
=== Albums ===
- 2016: Herzbewohner
- 2018: Mut zur Katastrophe
- 2019: Ich muss dir was sagen
- 2021: Nachts sind alle Katzen grau
- 2024: Für immer für dich

=== Singles ===
- 2016: "Scheissmelodie"
- 2018: "Regenbogenfarben"
- 2018: "Regenbogenfarben" (with Helene Fischer)

=== Featured in ===
- 2015: "Die immer lacht" (Stereoact feat. Kerstin Ott)
