= D-Flame =

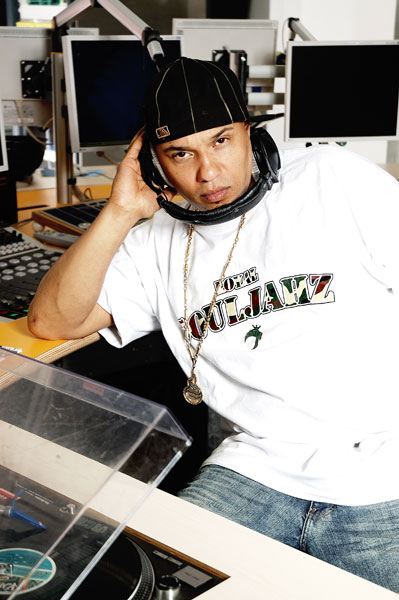

Background information
- Born: Daniel Kretschmer; 19 September 1971 (age 55)
- Origin: Frankfurt, Germany
- Genres: Hip hop, reggae, dancehall
- Years active: 1994–present
- Labels: Eastwest, Mercury, EMI
- Member of: Brothers Keepers

Daniel Kretschmer (born 19 September 1971), better known by his stage-name D-Flame, is a German hip hop and reggae musician. He was also previously part of the hip hop formation Asiatic Warriors.

== Discography ==
=== Albums ===
- 2000 - Basstard
- 2002 - Daniel X – eine schwarze deutsche Geschichte ("Daniel X – A Black German Story")
- 2003 - Unaufhaltsam ("Unstoppable")
- 2006 - F.F.M. (Flame F.M.)
- 2008 - ...Stress

=== Singles ===
- 1999 - "Heisser" ("Hotter")
- 2000 - "Sorry" (feat. Eißfeldt)
- 2001 - "Sie macht mich glücklich" ("She makes me happy")
- 2002 - "Mehr als Musik" ("More than just music" feat. Tone)
- 2002 - "Heimatlos" ("Homeless")
- 2002 - "Stopp"
- 2003 - "Kopf hoch" ("Chin up")
- 2003 - "Du kennst mich nicht" ("You don't know me")
- 2006 - "Burnin' Nonstop" (feat. Wayne Marshall)
- 2007 - "Mom Song"

== See also ==
- German hip hop
- List of reggae musicians
