= Prinz Pi =

German rapper (born 1979)

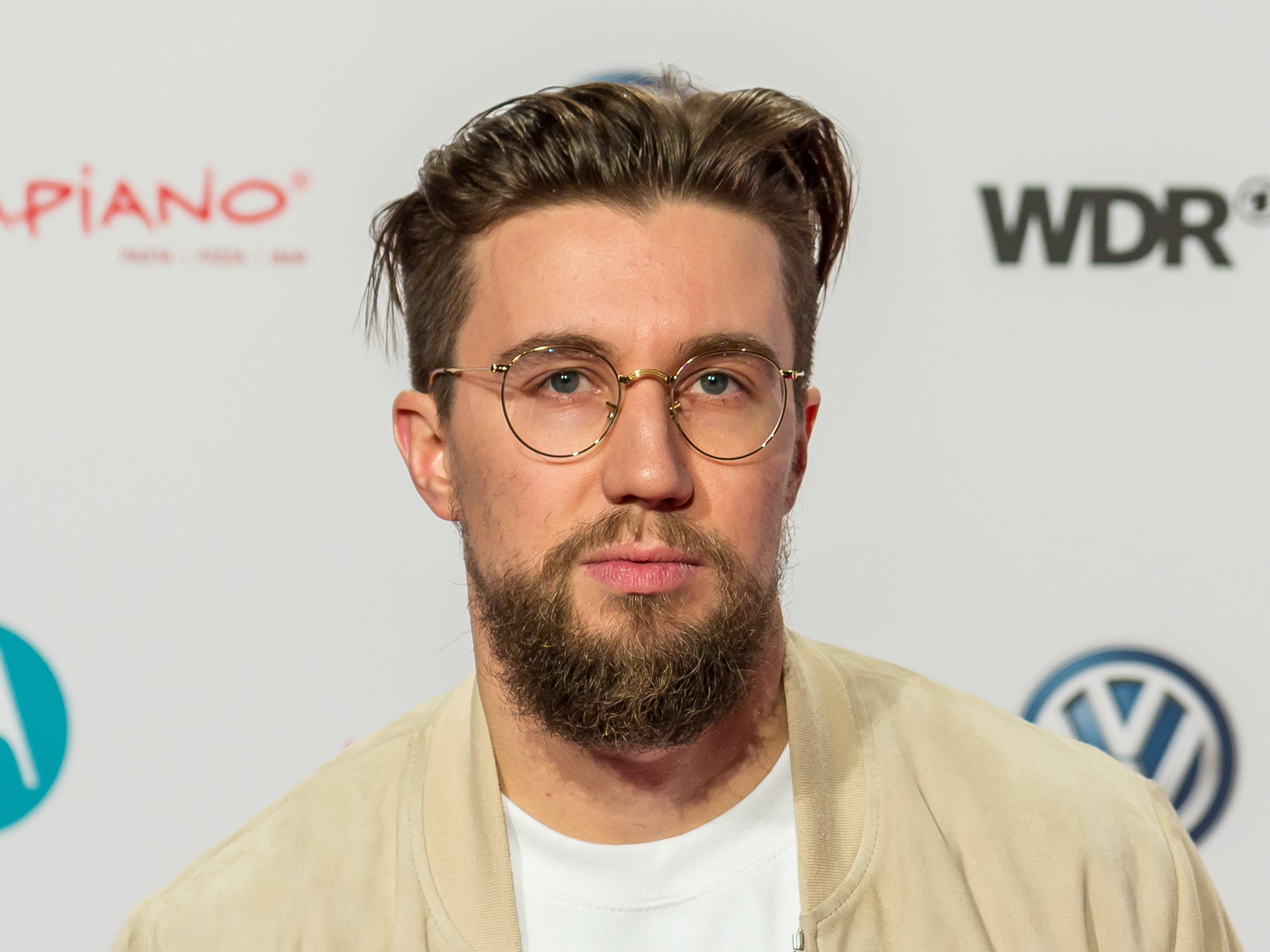
Prinz Pi, 2016

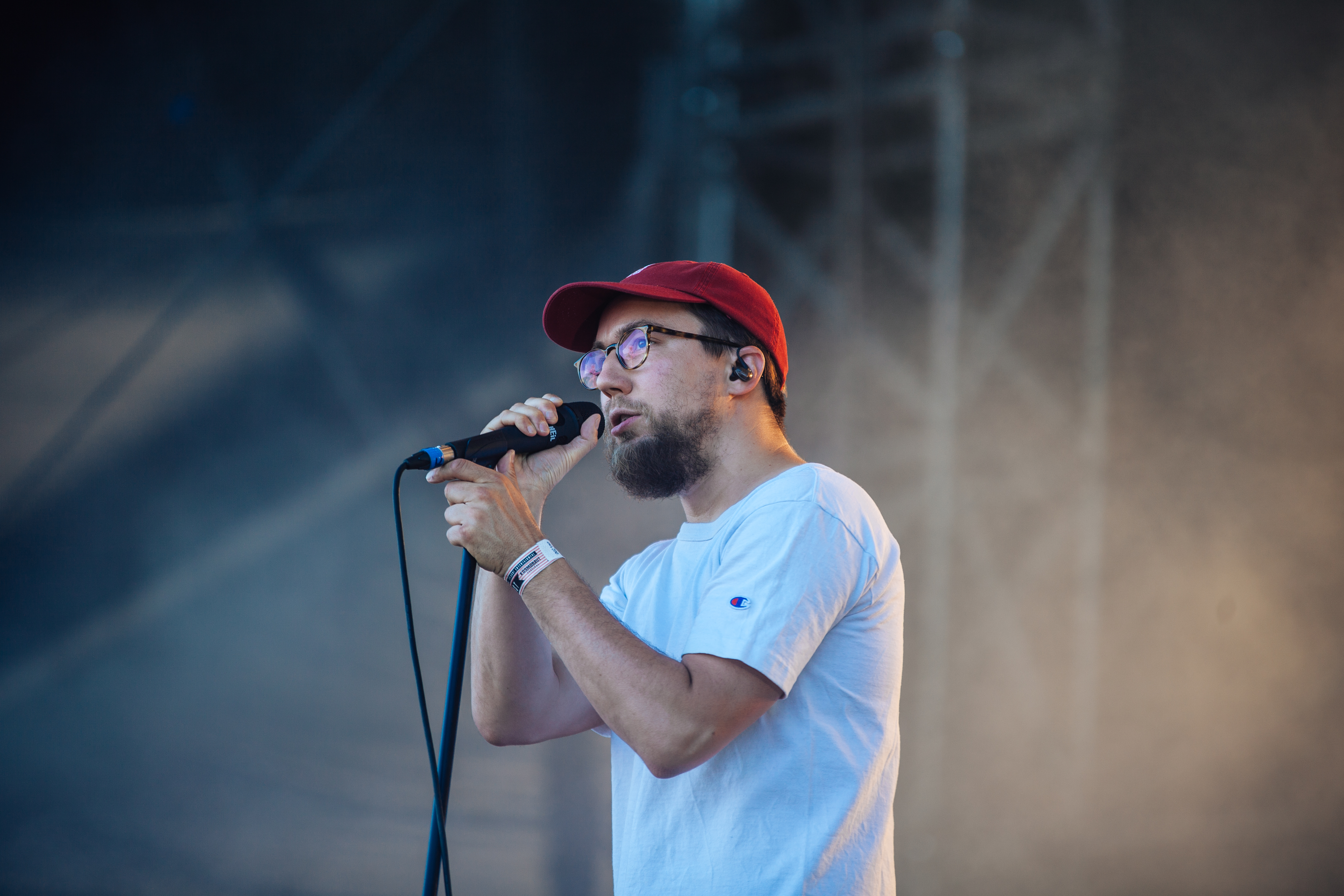
Prinz Pi at Kosmonaut Festival 2016 in Chemnitz

Friedrich Kautz (born 23 October 1979 in West Berlin), known professionally as Prinz Pi, is a German rapper. He is also known by the name Prinz Porno. He has performed at the FM4 Frequency Festival, Dockville, Hurricane Festival, Rock am Ring, Southside Festival, and Openair Frauenfeld. He has collaborated with producers and artists such as Beatzarre, Casper, RAF Camora, Nico Santos, Quarterhead, Kaizers Orchestra, Bosse, Capital Bra, Frank Zander, Adel Tawil, Sido, Bausa, and Mark Forster.

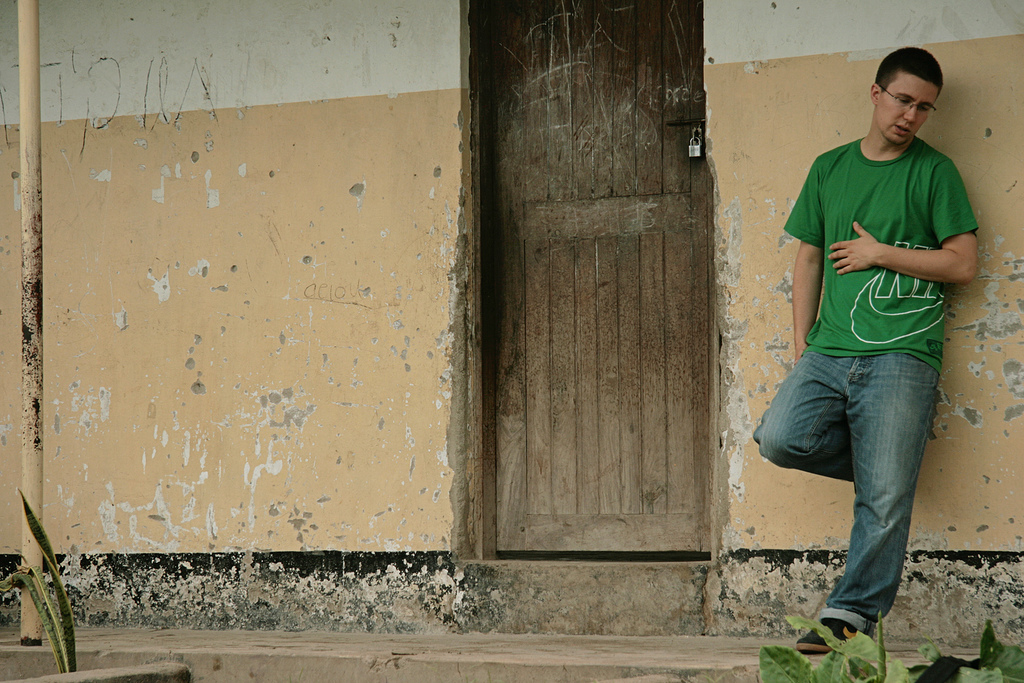
Prinz Pi 2008 in Tansania

== See also ==
- German hip-hop
