= Adel Tawil =

German singer, songwriter and producer

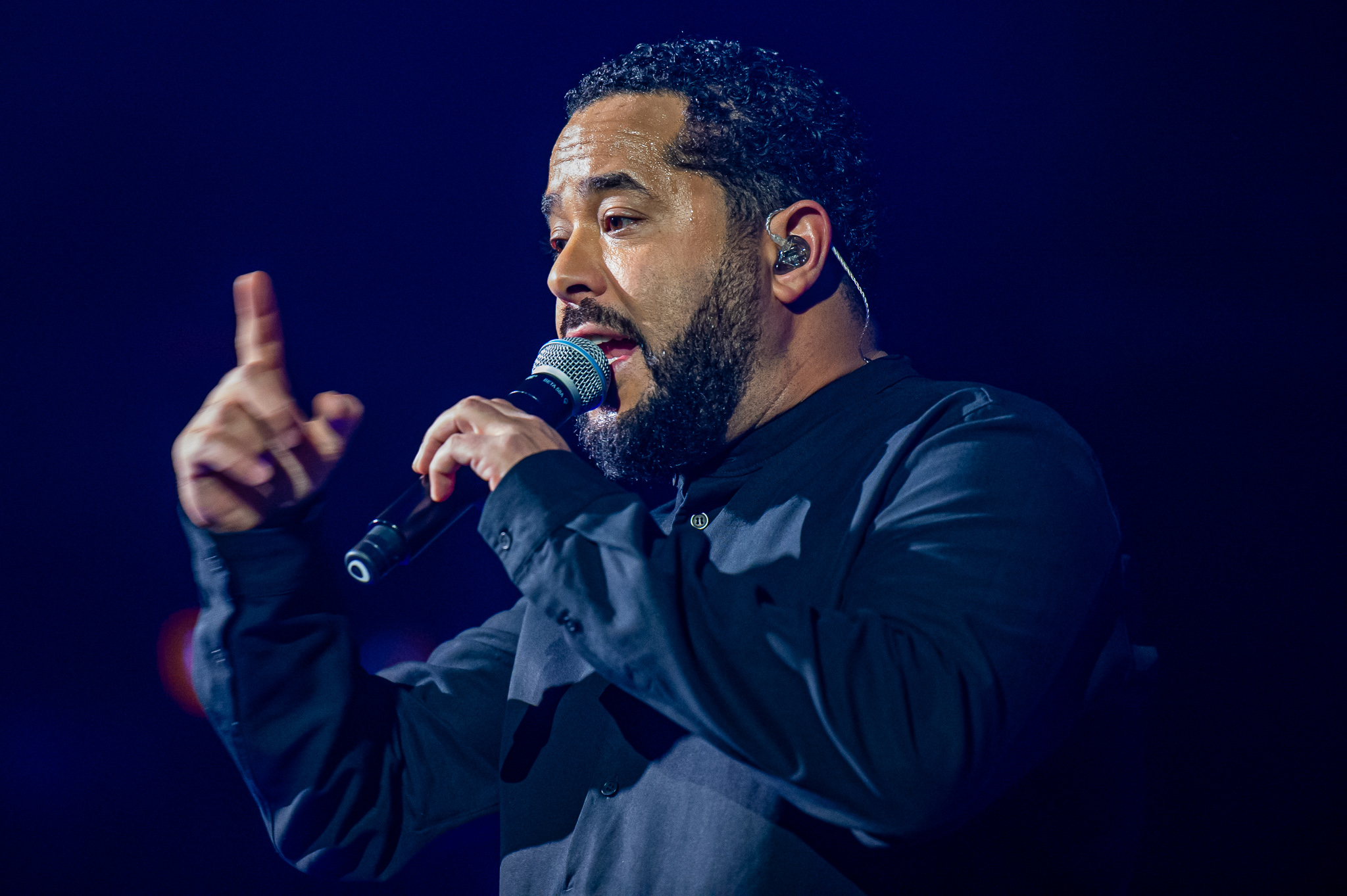
- Tawil performing in 2019

Background information
- Born: Adel Salah Mahmoud Eid El-Tawil; 15 August 1978 (age 47); Berlin, West Germany
- Genres: R&B; pop; hip hop
- Years active: 1996–present
- Website: adel-tawil.de

Adel Salah Mahmoud Eid El-Tawil (born 15 August 1978) is a German singer, songwriter and producer. Besides his solo career, he is part of the popular German duo Ich + Ich and a former member of the boy band The Boyz.

== Early life ==
Tawil was born in Berlin. His father Salah Tawil is Egyptian and his mother is Tunisian. He is the first born of three, having a younger brother, Hatem, and a sister, Rascha.

== Musical career ==
During the end of the 1990s, Tawil was part of the German boyband The Boyz. Since 2004, he and Annette Humpe have formed the duo known as Ich + Ich. They have released three albums, Ich + Ich (2005), Vom Selben Stern (2007) and Gute Reise (2009).

In 2007, Tawil teamed up with rapper Azad and released the song "Prison Break Anthem (Ich glaub' an dich)", which is the opening theme for the German version of Prison Break. He made another solo appearance with Tobias Schenke for the song "Niemand hat gesagt".

In 2007, Tawil held three spots in the top ten with two released singles and one album.

On 8 November 2013, he released his first solo album, Lieder, in Germany, and also toured in 2014.

== Personal life ==
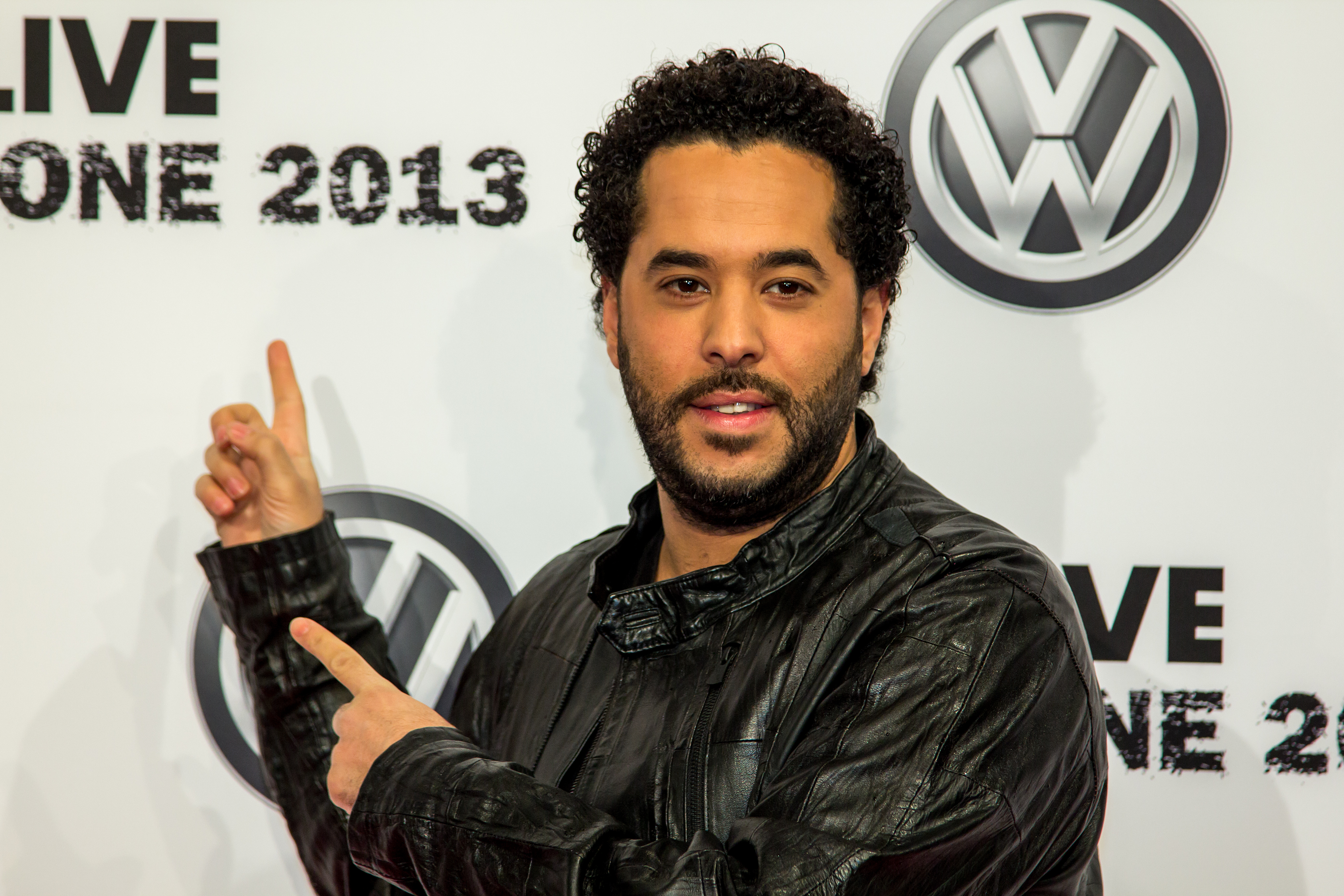
Tavil in 2013

In 2011, Tawil married his longtime girlfriend Jasmin Weber in a private ceremony in Berlin. In 2014, they separated. He currently lives with his girlfriend Lena.

== Discography ==
=== Studio albums ===
List of albums, with selected chart positions and certifications
Title	Album details	Peak positions			Certifications
Title	Album details	GER	AUT	SWI	Certifications
Lieder	Released: 7 November 2013; Label: Vertigo Berlin; Formats: CD, digital download	4	6	17	BVMI: 5× Gold; IFPI AUT: Platinum; IFPI SWI: Gold
So schön anders	Released: 21 April 2017; Label: Island; Formats: CD, digital download	1	5	3	BVMI: Gold
Alles lebt	Released: 21 June 2019; Label: Okapi, BMG; Formats: CD, digital download, streaming	7	17	7	
Spiegelbild	Released: 3 March 2023; Label: Okapi, BMG; Formats: CD, digital download, streaming	7	50	33	

=== Singles ===
As lead artist

Title	Year	Peak positions			Certifications	Album
Title	Year	GER	AUT	SWI	Certifications	Album
"Lieder"	2013	2	1	6	BVMI: 2× Platinum; IFPI AUT: Gold; IFPI SWI: Platinum	Lieder
"Aschenflug" (featuring Prinz Pi & Sido)	2013	18	33	41		Lieder
"Weinen"	2014	57	—	38		Lieder
"Zuhause" (featuring Matisyahu)	2014	23	6	64	BVMI: Gold	Lieder
"Kartenhaus"	2014	78	—	—		Lieder
"Wenn du liebst"	2015	—	—	—		Lieder
"Unsere Lieder"	2015	33	—	—		Non-album single
"Bis hier und noch weiter" (featuring KC Rebell & Summer Cem)	2017	23	72	97		So schön anders
"Ist da jemand"	2017	12	9	3	BVMI: Gold	So schön anders
"Gott steh mir bei"	2017	—	—	—		So schön anders
"Eine Welt eine Heimat" (featuring Youssou N’Dour & Mohamed Mounir)	2017	—	—	—		So schön anders
"So schön anders"	2017	—	—	—		So schön anders
"Polarlichter" (featuring MoTrip)	2017	—	—	—		So schön anders
"Flutlicht"	2018	—	—	—		Non-album single
"Tu m'appelles" (featuring Peachy)	2019	48	—	30		Alles lebt
"Neues Ich"	2019	—	—	—		Alles lebt

As featured artist

Title	Year	Peak positions			Certifications	Album
Title	Year	GER	AUT	SWI	Certifications	Album
"Niemand hat gesagt" (Tobias Schenke featuring Kane)	2003	85	—	—		The Dome Vol. 26
"Prison Break Anthem (Ich glaub' an dich)" (Azad featuring Adel Tawil)	2007	1	12	13	BVMI: Gold	Blockschrift
"Stadt" (Cassandra Steen featuring Adel Tawil)	2009	2	3	31	BVMI: Platinum	Darum leben wir
"Der Himmel soll warten" (Sido featuring Adel Tawil)	2010	2	4	28	BVMI: Gold	MTV Unplugged Live aus'm MV
"Ich will nur dass du weißt" (SDP featuring Adel Tawil)	2015	15	41	41	BVMI: 3× Gold	Zurück in die Zukunst
"Zuhause ist die Welt noch in Ordnung" (Sido featuring Adel Tawil)	2015	80	—	47	BVMI: Gold	VI
"Vielleicht" (Gestört aber GeiL featuring Adel Tawil)	2019	38	—	—		Non-album-single
