= Wonderwall (band) =

German band

Wonderwall is a German pop group. In its original formation, its members were Kati (Kathrin), eLa (Daniela) and Jule (Julia).

== Discography ==
=== Albums ===
- Witchcraft (2002)
- What Does It Mean? (2003)
- Come Along (2004)

=== Singles ===
- Witchcraft (2001)
- Who Am I? (2001)
- Just More (2002)
- In April (2002)
- Witchcraft 2003 (2003)
- (One More) Song for You (2003)
- Silent Tears (2004)
- Touch the Sky (2004)
- Losin´ You (2005)
- This is Christmas (2009)
- Me and the City (2011)
