= Ich + Ich =

German musical duo

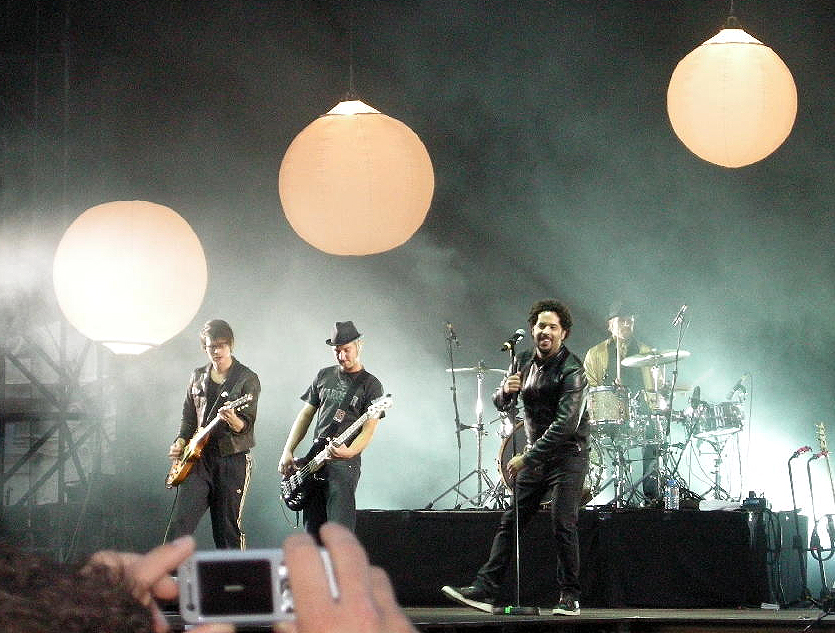
- Ich + Ich (2008)

Background information
- Origin: Berlin, Germany
- Genres: Pop
- Years active: 2003–present
- Label: Polydor/Universal
- Members: Annette Humpe; Adel Tawil
- Website: ich-und-ich.de

Ich + Ich (pronounced [ˈɪç ʔʊnt ˈʔɪç]; German for "I and I") is a musical project by German musicians Annette Humpe and Adel Tawil.

== History ==
They met in a Berlin recording studio in 2002 when Tawil sang on a production that Humpe had written. They have sold more than 2.6 million records in German-speaking nations.

Their first album, Ich + Ich, appeared on 18 April 2005, and two of its singles ("Du erinnerst mich an Liebe" and "Dienen") reached the German Top 10. The second album, Vom selben Stern, released on 29 June 2007, reached No. 1 in some charts. The first single of the album with the same name also reached the top 10, along with the second and third singles ("Stark" and "So soll es bleiben", with all three singles being certified platinum in Germany). This second album has sold more than 1 million copies and has been certified platinum in both Austria and Germany. The album also spawned two other singles, "Nichts bringt mich runter" and "Wenn ich tot bin".

On 13 November 2009, their third album, Gute Reise, was released, reaching once again the top of the German albums chart. Its first single, "Pflaster", became the band's first No.1 single in Germany.

In 2010, their single "So soll es bleiben" appeared in the official The X Factor video game for the Wii game console.

== Discography ==
=== Albums ===
List of albums, with selected chart positions
Year	Title	Peak chart positions			Certifications
Year	Title	GER	AUT	SWI	Certifications
2005	Ich + Ich	10	34	—	BVMI: 1× Gold
2007	Vom selben Stern	1	2	4	BVMI: 6× Platinum; IFPI AUT: Platinum; IFPI SWI: Platinum
2009	Gute Reise	1	4	5	BVMI: 5× Gold; IFPI SWI: Gold
"—" denotes a recording that did not chart or was not released in that territory.

=== Singles ===
List of singles, with selected chart positions
Year	Title	Peak chart positions				Certifications	Album
Year	Title	GER	AUT	SWI	EU	Certifications	Album
2004	"Geht's dir schon besser?"	67	—	—	—		Ich + Ich
2005	"Du erinnerst mich an Liebe"	4	6	63	18	BVMI: Gold	Ich + Ich
2005	"Dienen"	7	20	—	26		Ich + Ich
2005	"Umarme mich"	41	17	—	—		Ich + Ich
2007	"Vom selben Stern"	3	4	40	13	BVMI: 1× Platinum	Vom selben Stern
2007	"Stark"	2	2	5	9	BVMI: 1× Gold	Vom selben Stern
2008	"So soll es bleiben"	3	2	13	12	BVMI: 1× Platinum	Vom selben Stern
2008	"Nichts bringt mich runter"	20	32	—	78		Vom selben Stern
2008	"Wenn ich tot bin"	51	73	—	—		Vom selben Stern
2009	"Pflaster"	1	3	6	—	BVMI: 1× Gold	Gute Reise
2010	"Einer von Zweien"	18	36	—	—		Gute Reise
2010	"Universum"	10	13	—	—		Gute Reise
2010	"Hilf mir"	45	—	—	—		Gute Reise
"—" denotes a recording that did not chart or was not released in that territory.
