= List of Neue Deutsche Härte bands =

This is a list of notable Neue Deutsche Härte (NDH) bands.

Name	Years active	Origin	Ref.
ASP	1999–present	Frankfurt, Germany	
Eisbrecher	2003–present	Fürstenfeldbruck, Germany	
Erdling	2014–present	Essen, Germany	
Fleischmann	1989–1996	Berlin, Germany	
Hämatom	2004–present	Speichersdorf, Germany	
Heldmaschine	2011–present	Koblenz, Germany	
Hertzton	2001–present	Leverkusen, Germany	
Joachim Witt	1980s–present	Hamburg, Germany	
Knorkator	1994–present	Berlin, Germany	
Lindemann	2013–present	Germany / Sweden	
Megaherz	1993–present	Munich, Germany	
Nachtblut	2005–present	Osnabrück, Germany	
Null Positiv	2015–present	Lübbenau, Germany	
Oomph!	1989–present	Wolfsburg, Germany	
Rammstein	1994–present	Berlin, Germany	
Raubtier	2008–present	Haparanda, Sweden	
Ruoska	2002–present	Juva, Finland	
Schwarzer Engel	2007–present	Stuttgart, Germany	
Schweisser	1988-2001	Utting, Germany	
Silber	2003-2007	Berlin, Germany	
Stahlhammer	1992–2010	Vienna, Austria	
Stahlmann	2008–present	Göttingen, Germany	
Stoneman	2004–present	Switzerland	
Tanzwut	1998–present	Berlin, Germany	
Terminal Choice	1993–2011	Berlin, Germany	
Üebermutter	2006–present	Berlin, Germany	
Unheilig	1999–present	Aachen, Germany	
Weissglut	1996–2002	Bingen am Rhein, Germany	
