= Livealbum of Death =

Live album by Farin Urlaub Racing Team
- Released: 3 February 2006
- Recorded: 2006
- Genre: Punk rock Rock; Ska punk
- Length: 87:31
- Label: Völker hört die Tonträger / Universal Records
- Producer: Uwe Hoffmann, Farin Urlaub

Farin Urlaub chronology
Am Ende der Sonne (2005)	Livealbum of Death (2006)	Die Wahrheit übers Lügen (2008)

Livealbum of Death is the first live album by Farin Urlaub, incorporating his live-band Farin Urlaub Racing Team (FURT). At the same time it's the third album of Urlaub. It was released in 2006, as a CD- and a vinyl-edition, the latter consisting of six 7" discs. Each of the twelve sides of the vinyl-edition was named after one FURT-Member. The CD-edition utilized a new technology that enabled it to contain more than 85 minutes of music.

It contains recordings of live shows at Leipzig (30 May), Dresden (1 June), Berlin (2 June), Hamburg (20 and 21 June) and Bremen (22 June).

The single "Zehn" (Ten) was released on 13 January 2006. This song is only performed live and was therefore never released on any studio albums. The video for the song was already aired on 14 December 2005.

== The title ==
The title "Livealbum of Death" was invented by a fan during the FURT-Tour Sonnenblumen (Sunflowers) of Death, referring to the title of that tour and posted by him on the fan page dieaerzte.at. Urlaub and his Management were amazed by the suggestion and asked for allowance to use it. Then fan granted them to use it and in exchange was mentioned in the booklet of the album.

== Track listing ==
1. "Mehr" (More)
2. "Augenblick" (The moment, lit: the blink of an eye)
3. "Am Strand" (On the beach)
4. "Wie ich den Marilyn-Manson-Ähnlichkeitswettbewerb verlor" (How I lost the Marilyn Manson look-alike contest)
5. "Glücklich" (Happy)
6. "Petze" (Squealer)
7. "Noch einmal" (Once more)
8. "Dermitder" (That guy there with the Girl, lit: Him with Her)
9. "Wunderbar" (Wonderful)
10. "Phänomenal egal" (Phenomenally indifferent)
11. "Sonne" (Sun)
12. "Apocalypse wann anders" (Apocalypse some other day)
13. "Lieber Staat" (Dear state)
14. "Porzellan" (Porcelain)
15. "Zehn" (Ten)
16. "Der ziemlich okaye Popsong" (The fairly okay pop song)
17. "OK"/"Kein Zurück" (OK/No return)
18. "Unter Wasser" (Underwater)
19. "Immer noch" (Still)
20. "Dusche" (Shower)
21. "Wo ist das Problem?" (Where is the problem?)
22. "Abschiedslied" (Farewell song)
- Tracks 3, 5, 9, 10, 13, 22 & "OK" from Endlich Urlaub!
- Tracks 1, 2, 4, 7, 8, 11, 12, 14, 18-20 & "Kein zurück" from Am Ende der Sonne
- Track 21 from the single "Glücklich"
- Track 6 from the single "OK"

== Singles ==
2006: "Zehn"

== Personnel ==
- Farin Urlaub (guitar, vocals)
- Nesrin Sirinoglu (guitar)
- Cindia Knoke (bass)
- Rachel Rep (drums)
- Simone Richter, Celina Bostic, Vanessa Mason (Percussion, vocals)
- Annette Steinkamp (Keyboard, Percussion, vocals)
- Hans-Jörg Fischer, Peter Quintern (saxophone)
- R. "Hardy" Appich (trumpet)
- R. S. Göhring (trombone)
