= Swimming with Sharks (disambiguation) =

Swimming with Sharks is a 1994 American comedy-drama film, directed and written by George Huang.

Swimming with Sharks may also refer to:

- Swimming with Sharks (Get Smart! album), 1986
- Swimming With Sharks Records, a US record label founded Noah "Shark" Robertson in 2011
- Swimming with Sharks (TV series), a 2022 TV series inspired by the 1994 film
- Swimming with Sharks, a band project of German musicians Inga and Annette Humpe (also known as Humpe & Humpe)
  - Swimming with Sharks (Inga & Anete Humpe album), 1987
- Swimming with Sharks: Inside the World of the Bankers, a 2016 novel examining the UK banking industry by Joris Luyendijk
- How to Swim with Sharks: A Primer, written for swimming with actual sharks, but also relevant to human resource management
