= Mädchen =

Mädchen (German for "girl" or "girls") may refer to:

- Mädchen (album), a 1994 album by the German rock/pop duo Lucilectric
  - "Mädchen" (song), the title song from the album
- "Mädchen", a 1979 song by Freddy Breck
- Mädchen, Mädchen (English: Girls, Girls), also known as Girls on Top, a 2001 German film directed by Dennis Gansel
- Mädchen Amick, American actress
