= Nichimgriff =

Single by Farin Urlaub Racing Team

from the album Die Wahrheit übers Lügen
- Released: October 17, 2008
- Genre: Punk rock
- Length: 2:46
- Label: Völker hört die Tonträger
- Songwriter: Farin Urlaub
- Producer: Farin Urlaub

Farin Urlaub Racing Team singles chronology
"Zehn" (2006)	"Nichimgriff" (2008)	"Niemals" (2009)

"Nichimgriff" (Notundercontrol) is a song by Farin Urlaub Racing Team. It's the first single from Farin Urlaub's third solo studio album Die Wahrheit übers Lügen.

For the whole Racing Team, this is the second single and as that, the first taste of what FURT sounds in studio, because the only previous single "Zehn" is from the live album Livealbum of Death.

The song is about a man, who thinks he's perfect in every way and others are to blame for his faults; nobody pays him respect. Thus, he doesn't have his life under control.

The single was released on October 17.

== Music video ==
The video debuted on MTV Central in the show "TRL" on September 26.

It shows FURT performing in a gas station. A symbol from the album art of Endlich Urlaub!, an orange jerrycan is seen throughout the song. A parallel storyline shows a young woman getting into an Opel Commodore A with a friend and then driving off, headbanging to the music. On the road, they pick up many different people and then all headbang together, till they drive into the gas station, which makes it blow up.

== Track listing ==
1. "Nichimgriff" – 2:46
2. "Bewegungslos" (Motionless) – 3:14
3. "Nichimgriff" (Video) – 2:58

== Charts ==
Chart (2008)	Peak position
Austria (Ö3 Austria Top 40)	29
Germany (GfK)	26
Switzerland (Schweizer Hitparade)	81
