= Planet Oz =

Studio album by Inga Humpe
- Released: 21 September 1990
- Length: 43:16
- Label: East West
- Producer: Fischerman's Friend; Thomas Fehlmann; Andy Richards; Trevor Horn

Singles from Planet Oz
- 1. "Riding into Blue (Cowboy Song)" Released: 18 June 1990; 2. "Do I Have To" Released: 28 January 1991

Planet Oz is the only solo studio album by German singer and songwriter Inga Humpe, released by East West on 21 September 1990.

== Background ==
After the disbanding of Humpe & Humpe, a duo with her sister Annette Humpe, Inga Humpe embarked on a solo career and moved from Germany to London in 1989 to work with English musicians. Her debut single, a cover of "Something Stupid", was released in November 1989. On 18 June 1990, "Riding into Blue (Cowboy Song)" was released as the lead single from her forthcoming album, Planet Oz. The song was written and produced by Trevor Horn. It achieved radio play in the UK and peaked at number 93 in the UK Singles Chart.

Planet Oz was released in Europe on 21 September 1990, but its UK release was held back until 25 February 1991. Speaking to The Independent in 1991, Humpe said of the album, "I had 20 songs ready and a clear idea of how I wanted them to sound. [They sound] artificial somehow... you could say the music is a house or a landscape for my voice. I think with the next album I could go much further rhythmically." The second single, "Do I Have To", was released on 28 January 1991 but failed to reach the top 100. A cover of a Pet Shop Boys B-side from 1987, Humpe came to record the song after a chance meeting with the duo. Humpe revealed to The Independent in 1991, "I think they're the best pop songwriters. They were working in the studio next door and we met by chance. They suggested another song for me, but I liked 'Do I Have To'. It's the story of a love affair with three people."

== Critical reception ==
Upon its release in Europe, Music & Media described Planet Oz as "fairy-tale synthesizer pop" which "specialises in ambient ballads and sophisticated dance songs". They noted Humpe's vocals as "sweet, with a naive, childlike quality" and added that the album sounds like "a cross between Kate Bush and Grace Jones, without the mystique or flamboyance but still possessing a dream presence". Craig Gavin of the East Kilbride World reviewed the "Do I Have To" single in 1991 and commented that it was a "surprise", having not been familiar with Humpe and so was not "expect[ing] too much". He did not think Humpe had a "great voice" but added "it's certainly unusual" and felt the song suited it. He stated, "I look forward to hearing more from Inga – and I hope that all her future numbers are so well chosen."

== Track listing ==
No.	Title	Writer(s)	Length
1.	"Riding into Blue (Cowboy Song)"	Trevor Horn	4:10
2.	"The 1 I Love"	Inga Humpe, Annette Humpe	4:21
3.	"Ghostloversland"	Inga Humpe, Fischerman's Friend	4:37
4.	"First 5 Seconds"	Inga Humpe, Annette Humpe, Liam Sternberg	3:41
5.	"Cry"	Inga Humpe	5:23
6.	"Do I Have To"	Neil Tennant, Chris Lowe	4:10
7.	"Something Good"	Inga Humpe, Sternberg	3:32
8.	"Heaven"	Inga Humpe	5:02
9.	"Something Stupid"	Carson Parks	4:28
10.	"Moon"	Inga Humpe	3:49

== Personnel ==
- Inga Humpe – vocals (1–10)
- George De Angelis – keyboards (1), drum programming (1)
- Billy Liesegang – guitars (1)
- Lol Creme – rhythm guitar (1), 'who's the loner' vocals (1)
- Geoff Dugmore – drum programming (1)
- Pete Glenister – end guitar riff (1)
- Trevor Horn – 'some little inconsequential knick knacks' (1)
- Andy Richards – programming (6, 8, 9)
- Luís Jardim – percussion (6, 8)
- Robert Fripp – guitar (8)
- Gavin Wright – strings (8)
- Adam & Eve – additional programming (9)

Production

- Trevor Horn – production (1)
- Pete Schwier – engineering (1)
- Tim Weidner – additional engineering (1)
- Steve Fitzmaurice – assistant engineering (1)
- Richard Edwards – assistant engineering (1)
- Pete Frith – assistant engineering (1)
- Danton Supple – assistant engineering (1)
- Fischerman's Friend – production (2–5, 7, 10), programming (2–5, 7, 10), mixing (2–5, 7, 10), additional production (8), additional mixing (8)
- Thomas Fehlmann – production (2–5, 7, 10), programming (2–5, 7, 10), mixing (2–5, 7, 10), additional production (8), additional mixing (8)
- Andy Richards – production (6, 8, 9)
- Ben Fenner – engineering (6, 8, 9), mixing (6)
- Tony Arnold – guitar recording (8)
- Adam & Eve – additional production (9), additional mixing (9)
- Phil Da Costa – mix engineer

Other

- Michael Nash Associates – art direction, design
- Mike Owen – photography
