= Zu heiß =

Single by Farin Urlaub Racing Team

from the album Die Wahrheit übers Lügen
- Released: 18 June 2010 as CD
- Genre: Alternative rock, reggae rock, ska
- Length: 4:00
- Label: Völker hört die Tonträger
- Songwriter(s): Farin Urlaub
- Producer(s): Farin Urlaub

Farin Urlaub Racing Team singles chronology
"Krieg" (2009)	"Zu heiß" (2010)

"Zu heiß" (Too hot) is a song by Farin Urlaub Racing Team. It's the fourth and final single and the second track from the second CD "Kleines Album (Ponyhof)", which is from the album Die Wahrheit übers Lügen.

The single also includes the song "Der Frauenflüsterer", a live version of the song "Karten" and a video documentation about the touring of the band.

== Track listing ==
1. "Zu heiß (Radio Edit)" (Too hot) – 4:00
2. "Der Frauenflüsterer" (The Woman Whisperer) – 4:04
3. "Karten (Live-Version)" (Cards) – 5:02
4. "Zu heiß" (Video) – 21:07
