= Codo (song) =

"Codo … düse im Sauseschritt"
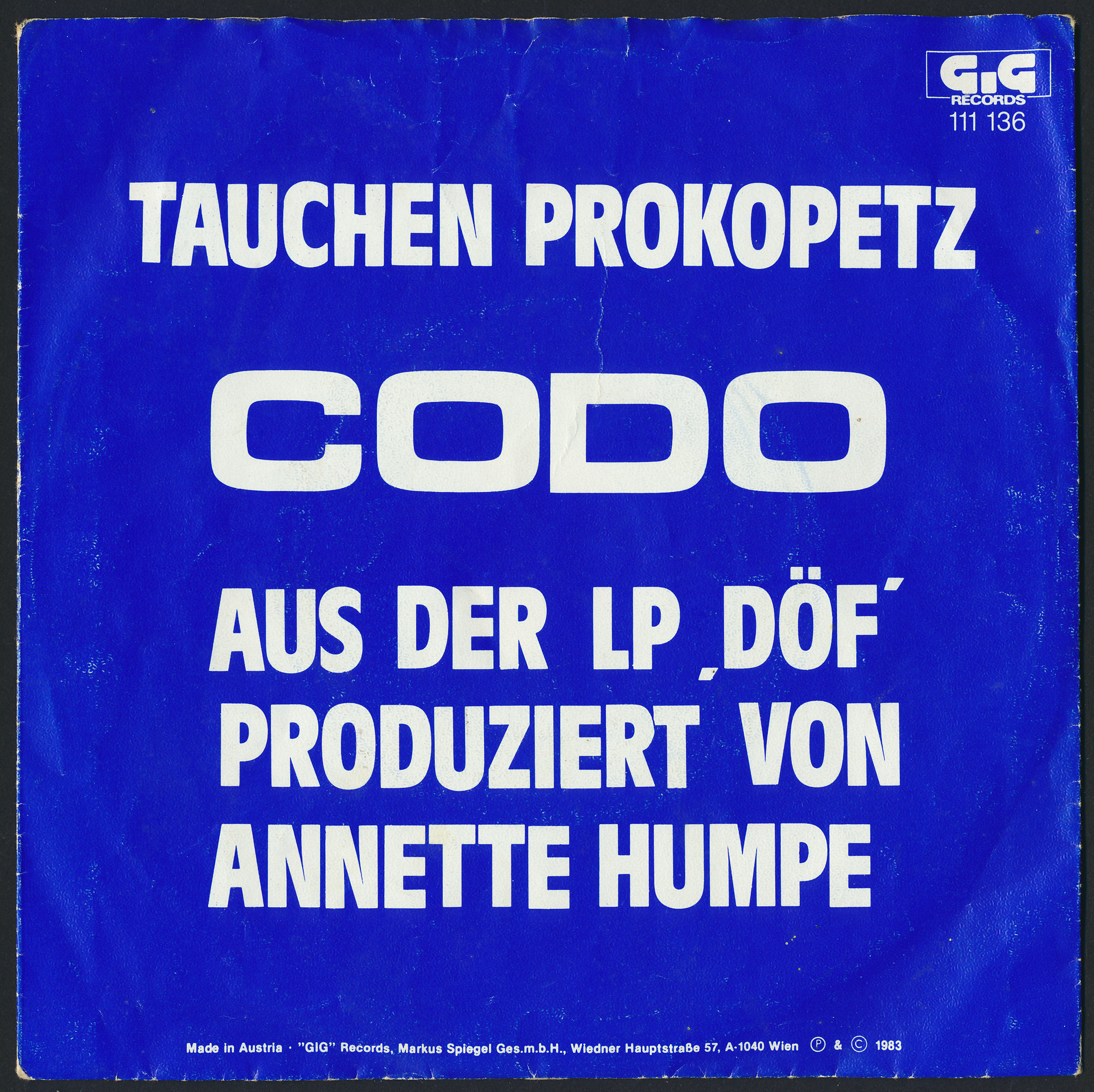

Single by Deutsch-Österreichisches Feingefühl

from the album DÖF
- Language: German
- Released: 1983
- Genre: Neue Deutsche Welle
- Length: 4:24
- Songwriters: Annette Humpe, Georg Januszewski, Josef Prokopetz, Manfred Oskar Tauchen

Music video
- "Codo" on YouTube

"Codo … düse im Sauseschritt" is a 1983 song by the Neue Deutsche Welle band Deutsch-Österreichisches Feingefühl that peaked the single charts in West Germany, Austria, Belgium, and the Netherlands.

== Release ==
Initially charting in Germany's Top 100 Singles on 4 July 1983, "Codo" rose up the chart before peaking at number-one on 8 August that year, making it the last Neue Deutsche Welle (NDW) song on record to attain that peak in the GfK Entertainment charts.

== Critical reception ==
American historian Claudia Lonkin noted that the song was a social critique on hatefulness and the division of global society, with Codo playing the role of a "benevolent outsider" who triumphs in abolishing the "global hate regime". However, a reporter for the Deutsch Centre criticized the single for being shallow, stating that it, alongside much of NDW music, was "cringeworthy [and] bordering embarassing. [sic]"

== Charts ==
=== Weekly charts ===
Chart (1983)	Peak position
Austria (Ö3 Austria Top 40)	1
Belgium (Ultratop 50 Flanders)	1
Netherlands (Dutch Top 40)	1
Switzerland (Schweizer Hitparade)	4
West Germany (GfK)	1

== Copyright disputes ==
=== Similarities to the "Buffy theme" ===
Codo contains a chord progression (occasionally hummed by backing singers from 0:50 onwards) that is very similar to the "Buffy theme", the theme song of Buffy the Vampire Slayer, an American TV series that was first aired in the late 1990s.

In 2006, Nerf Herder, the band that composed and performed that tune, said that they had "never heard of Döf", and the similarity was "coincidental". Back in 1999, Nerf Herder lead singer, Parry Grip gave the background on the writing of the melody, the original melody was not written specifically for the show, it had been in place before Whedon contacted the band asking them to submit a demo for a theme tune,

"We did the theme song before the show was on the air. It was a song that had already been written, but we really didn't know where to take it. I had some ideas - it was originally going to have some kind of science-fiction theme, which is weird, because we don't do songs like that. I remember having the title of 'Outer Space Rock' or something like that; that was a working thing."

=== Plagiarism lawsuit ===
After the song was released, Holger Biege filed a copyright dispute against DÖF over the melody of the title, as he believed that melody came from one of his compositions, Küss mich und lieb mich, which was sung by Gerd Christian in East Germany. According to his widow, after he escaped from East Germany in 1983, Biege found out that one of the writers allegedly copied the melody and made fun of East Germany. After an appeal, the case went to another regional court, where a settlement was proposed. However, Biege later waived further legal action.

== Legacy ==
In March 2016, retired National Hockey League player Doug Gilmour referenced the song in a post in The Players' Tribune.
