= Üebermutter =

German rock band

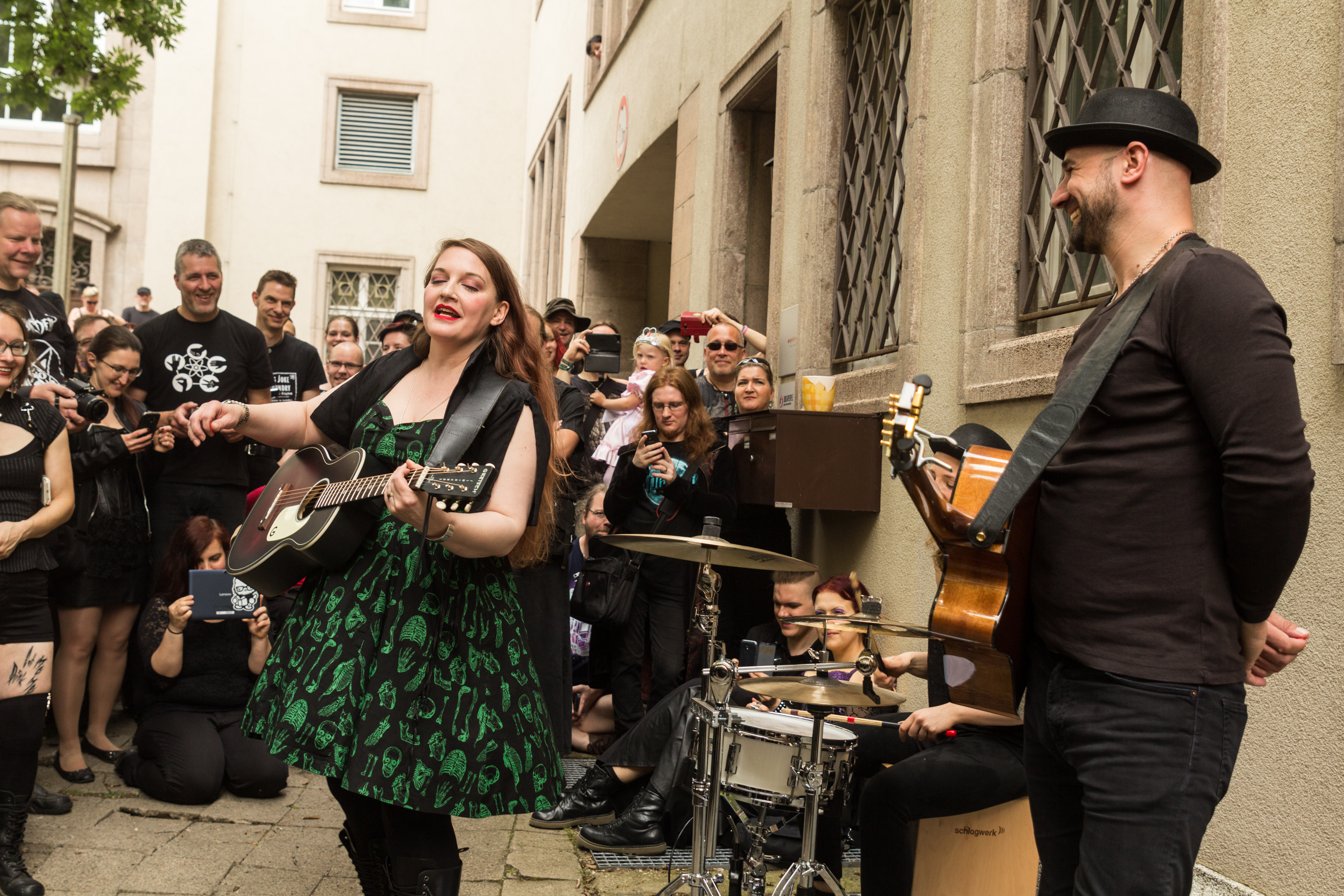
- Üebermutter at Wave-Gotik-Treffen 2017

Background information
- Origin: Berlin, Germany
- Genres: Neue Deutsche Härte
- Years active: 2006–present
- Labels: Roadrunner Records
- Members: Luci van Org; Michael Brettner; Peggy Junghanns; Anja Schlemm; Sabine Ahlbrecht

Üebermutter is a German band founded by singer Luci van Org in 2006. It is associated with the Neue Deutsche Härte style and has a satirical image based on postfeminism and militaristic aesthetics. The band released its debut album Unheil! through Roadrunner Records in 2008.

== History ==
Berlin singer Luci van Org had a mainstream hit in Germany in 1994 with the pop group Lucilectric, after which she continued to make music in several styles and constellations. She says she always was into heavy music and dark, brutal aesthetics. In 2006, she founded Üebermutter together with Michael Brettner on guitar, Peggy Junghanns on guitar, Anja Schlemm on bass and Sabine Ahlbrecht on drums. The band signed with Roadrunner Records which released its debut album Unheil! on 4 April 2008. The album track "Heim und Herd" was released as a single with a music video.

== Music, lyrics and image ==
Org based Üebermutter on what she calls a postfeminist concept. It involves aesthetics inspired by 1950s images of women, militaristic clothing and elements of BDSM culture. The lyrics are in German and written by Org. The sound is within the Neue Deutsche Härte style, which is a form of heavy metal with elements of electronic body music. The genre is typically male-dominated, which makes Üebermutter unusual with its female vocalist.

The sarcastic and satirical songs make statements about subjects such as war, child abuse, gender roles and sexual liberation. The apparent contradiction between aesthetics and message is common in industrial music; according to Org, the idea is to invert an association and to show the origin of a problem: "When you put your finger to a wound, I think it's only logical to simultaneously show where the injury comes from." The song "Mäedchen TeilZwo" is about child abuse and its title references Lucilectric's hit song "Mädchen". "Heim und Herd" is written in opposition to the view of women as responsible for the home and the raising of children. "Unheil!" samples march music, references Joseph Goebbels with the line "Wollt ihr das totale Lied" (lit. 'Do you want the total song?') and is full of totalitarian-sounding phrases.

When Üebermutter performed at the Teddy Awards in 2007, Die Tageszeitung described it as a "fetish metal project" and associated its "feminist-agitational lyrics" with the public debate surrounding Eva Herman. When Unheil! was released, there were critics who accused Üebermutter of being a calculated attempt to commercially exploit a genre. Org responded that she was incapable of doing that, citing her bank account as evidence. According to Metal.de's music critic Florian, the reason metal fans will be sceptical of Üebermutter is partially that the quality of Unheil! is mixed, and partially that the band does not serve the metal genre, but uses its form for its own purposes. In his review of Unheil!, he says descriptions make the band sound more preachy than it is, because a core in Org's work has always been to use wordplay and sarcasm to make it hard to know where exactly she stands. Describing Üebermutter as lyrically interesting and "not really transparent", he emphasises its place within the Neue Deutsche Härte genre and influences from Nina Hagen. He highlights "Heim und Herd", "Mäedchen TeilZwo", "Brenne!", "Wein' mir ein Meer" and "Unheil!", but dismisses the rest of the tracks and says the album does not live up to what "Heim und Herd" promised upon the single release. In his review for Laut.de, Michael Edele says Unheil! is not metal, lacks inspiration and that Org tries and fails to impersonate Hagen, hoping that metal fans will be "hype-resistant". Edele says "Heim und Herd" has some hit potential but has a dumb chorus, and the last track, "Unheil!", is the only with some appeal on a musical level.

== See also ==
- List of Neue Deutsche Härte bands
