= Palast Orchester =

German orchestra

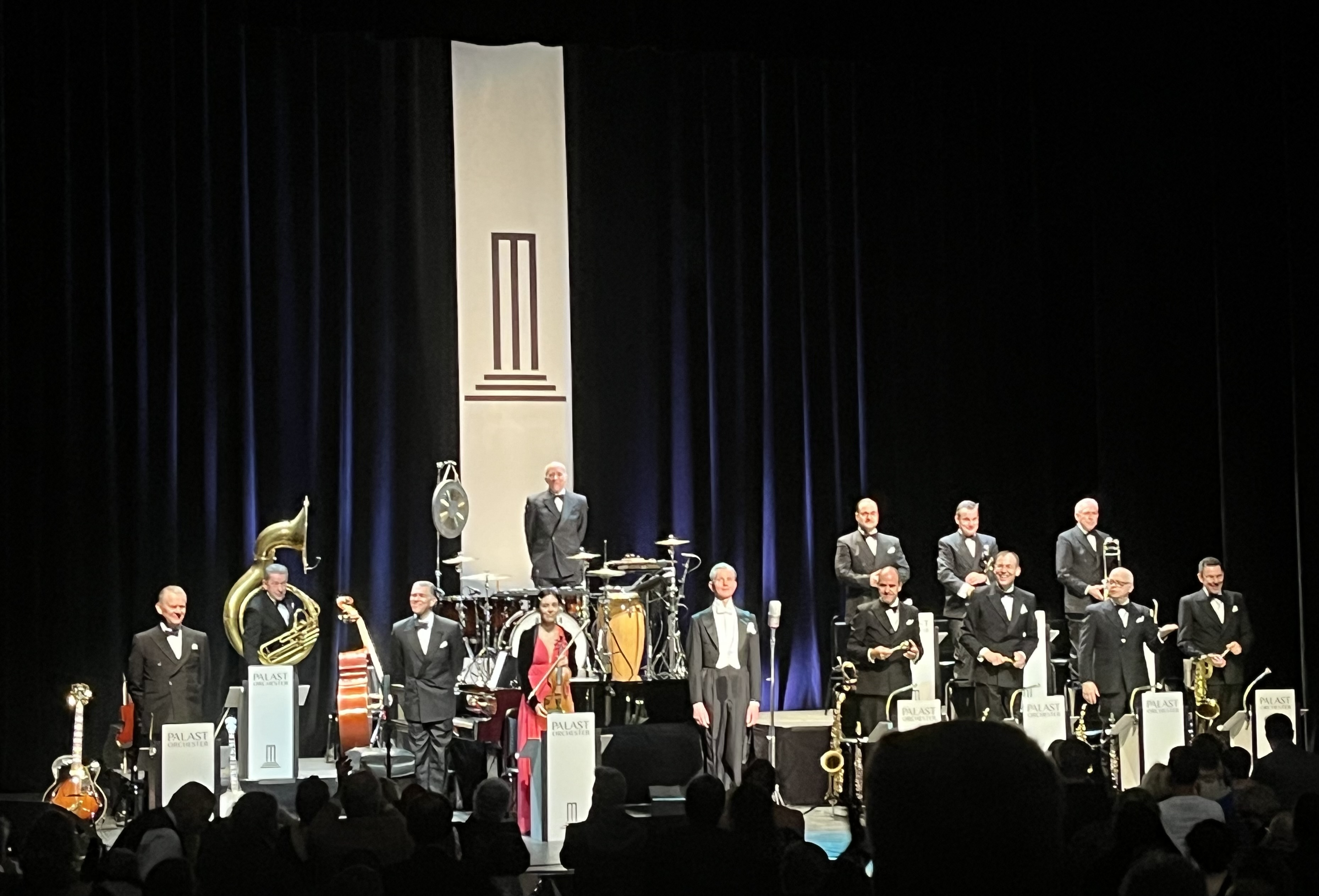
The Palast Orchester following a performance at the Lincoln Theatre in 2024

The Palast Orchester (literal translation, Palace Orchestra) is a German orchestra, based in Berlin, constituted in the manner of dance bands of the 1920s and 1930s. Its repertoire specialises in cabaret and popular songs of the Weimar period in Germany and in American popular songs of the same era. The orchestra performs around 120 concerts per year.

== History ==
Max Raabe founded the orchestra with fellow students at the Berlin University of the Arts in 1985. The ensemble initially used music arrangements that Raabe found whilst shopping at various flea markets. The orchestra worked for one year on learning these arrangements without any public engagements or performances. The orchestra gave its first public performance at the 1987 Berlin Theaterball, in the lobby as a secondary act, but with such success that the audience left the ballroom to hear the orchestra's performance in the lobby. The ensemble had its first song hit 5 years later, an original song by Raabe, "Kein Schwein ruft mich an".

The members of the orchestra are all men, with the single exception of the violinist, who has always been female. The violinists who have served with the Palast Orchester have included:

- Michaela Hüttich (1986–1998)
- Emily Bowman (1998–2000)
- Hanne Berger (2001–2007)
- Cecilia Crisafulli (2007–present)

The current full roster of the orchestra is:

- Max Raabe (vocalist)
- Cecilia Crisafulli (violin)
- Sven Bährens (clarinet, alto saxophone, trumpet)
- Bernd Hugo Dieterich (double bass, sousaphone)
- Michael Enders (trumpet)
- Johannes Ernst (alto saxophone)
- Rainer Fox (baritone saxophone, flute, guitar)
- Bernd Frank (tenor saxophone)
- Ulrich Hoffmeier (guitar, banjo, balalaika)
- Thomas Huder (trumpet)
- Jörn Ranke (trombone, viola)
- Fabio Duwentester (percussion)
- Ian Wekwerth (piano)

The performances by the orchestra are an homage to composers of the Weimar era such as Walter Jurmann, Fritz Rotter, Will Meisel, Charles Amberg, Jerzy Petersburski, Günter Schwenn, Adolf Steimel and Ralph Maria Siegel. In addition to its performances of vintage German and American popular songs, the orchestra has also performed contemporary music in the same musical style as the earlier songs, including covers of songs by Britney Spears, Tom Jones, and Salt'n'Pepa.

The orchestra made its Carnegie Hall debut in 2005. The ensemble returned to Carnegie Hall in November 2007, and the performance was recorded for commercial release on the album Heute Nacht oder nie – Live In New York. The orchestra returned to Carnegie Hall in March 2014. The orchestra has collaborated with musicians such as HK Gruber, Peter Lohmeyer, and Heino Ferch. In other media, the orchestra appeared in the 1994 film Der bewegte Mann.

== Discography ==
- Die Männer sind schon die Liebe wert (1988, Monopol)
- Kleines Fräulein, einen Augenblick (1989, Monopol)
- Ich hör' so gern Musik (1991, Monopol)
- Live im Wintergarten (1992, Monopol)
- Dort tanzt Lu-Lu! (1994, Monopol)
- Bel Ami (1995, Monopol)
- Music, Maestro, Please (1996, Monopol)
- Die größten Erfolge (1996, Monopol)
- Mein kleiner grüner Kaktus (1997, Monopol)
- Tanz-Gala (1997, Monopol)
- Ein Freund, ein guter Freund (1999. RCA Local/Sony Music)
- Junger Mann im Frühling (1999. Monopol)
- Krokodile und andere Hausfreunde (2000, RCA Local/Sony Music)
- Ich wollt ich wär ein Huhn (2001, RCA Local/Sony Music)
- Charming Weill (2001, RCA Local/Sony Music)
- Superhits (2001, RCA Local/Sony Music)
- Vom Himmel hoch, Da Komm' Ich Her (2002, RCA Local/Sony Music)
- Superhits Nummer 2 (2002, RCA Local/Sony Music)
- Palast Revue (2003, Warner Special Music)
- Max Raabe singt (2005, Monopol/Sony Music Austria)
- Wochenend & Sonnenschein (2006, RCA Local/Sony Music)
- Komm, lass uns einen kleinen Rumba tanzen (2006, Warner Special Music)
- Advent (2006, RCA Local/Sony Music)
- In Der Bar (2008, Sony BMG Music)
- Heute Nacht Oder Nie (Tonight or Never) (2008, SPV)
- Übers Meer (2010, Decca/Universal)
- Küssen kann man nicht alleine (2011, Decca) (with Annette Humpe)
- Für Frauen ist das kein Problem (2013, Decca) (with Annette Humpe)
- Für Frauen ist das kein Problem – Zugabe Edition (2013, Decca) (with Annette Humpe)
- The Golden Age (2013, Decca)
- Eine Nacht in Berlin (2014, We Love Music)
- Der perfekte Moment... wird heut verpennt (2017, We Love Music) (with Annette Humpe & Peter Plate)

- MTV Unplugged (2019, Deutsche Grammophon GmbH, Berlin)

== Videography ==
- Palast Revue Deluxe Edition (2003, Universum Film/Black Hill Pictures)
- Live in Rome (2005, Warner Home Video)
- Live in der Waldbühne (2006, Universum Film BmbH)
- Heute Nacht oder Nie (2009, SPV)
- Eine Nacht in Berlin (2014, We Love Music)
