= Careless Love (disambiguation) =

"Careless Love" is a jazz standard

Careless Love may also refer to:

- Careless Love (film), 2012 Australian drama film
- Careless Love (album), jazz album by Madeleine Peyroux 2004
- "Careless Love" (Inga & Anete Humpe song), 1987
- "Careless Love" (Treme), 2012 episode

== See also ==
- "Careless Lover", a track on Four Letter Lie's A New Day
- The Careless Lovers, a 1673 play by Edward Ravenscroft
