= Tiefer =

Studio album by Lucilectric
- Released: 1997
- Recorded: 1997 at various studios in Berlin, Hamburg, Wolperath and Stuttgart
- Genre: Pop rock
- Label: Electrola
- Producer: Luci van Org, Ralf Goldkind

Lucilectric chronology
Süß und Gemein (1996)	Tiefer (1997)

Tiefer (German for deeper) is the third and final studio album by the pop rock band Lucilectric. It was released in 1997 on Electrola.

== Track listing ==
No.	Title	Length
1.	"Peinlich"	4:03
2.	"Bye-Bye"	4:13
3.	"Wild und Gefährlich"	3:12
4.	"Freundin"	4:33
5.	"Heute Nacht"	3:30
6.	"Uh!"	3:43
7.	"Miau"	3:55
8.	"Tiefer"	3:32
9.	"Schlauchboot"	3:07
10.	"Heavy Metal"	3:45
11.	"Ergeben"	3:34
13.	"Freundin Reprise"	1:05
14.	"Traum"	6:40

All tracks written by van Org and Goldkind

== Personnel ==
- Luci van Org - lead vocals, producer
- Ralf Goldkind - vocals, guitar, keyboard & executive producer

=== Additional musicians ===
- Gerry Schmalzl - electric & acoustic guitar
- Ingo Kraus - special effects
- Jurij Panfilowitsch - ride cymbal
- Michi Beck - backing vocals
- Thomas D. - backing vocals
- Rose Zone - backing vocals

=== Production ===
- And.Y - Producer and engineer
- Klaus Scharff - engineering
- Johannes Schmöling - sound engineering
- Achim Kruse post-production

=== Additional personnel ===
- Phoor Design - sleeve concept and artwork
