= Süß und Gemein =

Studio album by Lucilectric
- Released: August 12, 1996
- Recorded: 1996 in Berlin and Hamburg
- Genre: Pop/rock
- Label: Sony BMG / Sing Sing
- Producers: Luci van Org, Ralf Goldkind

Lucilectric chronology
Mädchen (1994)	Süß und Gemein (1996)	Tiefer (1997)

Süß und Gemein is the second studio album of the German rock/pop duo Lucilectric, released in 1996. The album reached #45 in the Austrian charts, while the highest-charting single, Liebe macht dumm, reached #20.

== Track listing ==
No.	Title	Length
1.	"Fernsehen"	3:59
2.	"Süss und gemein"	3:20
3.	"Wohin du willst"	3:52
4.	"Willst du mich"	4:05
5.	"Liebe macht dumm"	3:32
6.	"Farben"	4:18
7.	"Geschenk"	3:38
8.	"Rate mal"	3:27
9.	"Gespenst"	5:58
10.	"Hey"	3:35
11.	"Muscheln und Algen"	6:38
13.	"Kondom des Grauens"	3:29

Cover art for the Liebe Macht Dumm single

== Charts ==
Chart (1996)	Peak position
Austrian Albums Chart	45

=== Singles ===
Year	Single	Chart positions	
Year	Single	DE	AT
1996	"Liebe macht dumm"	89	20
