= Luci van Org =

German musician (born 1971)

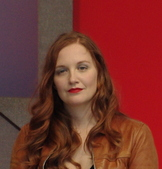
- Luci van Org in 2009
- Born: Ina Lucia Korch; 1 September 1971 (age 54); West Berlin, West Germany
- Other names: Ina Lucia Hildebrand; Eena
- Occupations: Musician; writer; actress
- Years active: 1987–present
- Spouse: Axel Hildebrand
- Musical career
- Genres: Pop; Neue Deutsche Härte
- Member of: Üebermutter; Meystersinger; Lucina Soteira
- Formerly of: Lucilectric; Das Haus von Luci

Ina Lucia Hildebrand (born 1 September 1971), known professionally as Luci van Org, is a German musician and writer. She is best known as the singer of the group Lucilectric, whose song "Mädchen" was a hit in Germany in 1994. Since then, she has written music for other artists and her own projects Das Haus von Luci, Üebermutter, Meystersinger and Lucina Soteira, which span over multiple genres. She has written and acted in films and television series and is the author of several novels inspired by Germanic mythology.

== Early life ==
Ina Lucia Korch was born in Berlin's Tempelhof district on 1 September 1971. Her parents were the sculptor and graphic artist Claus Korch and the painter Katharina Korch. She grew up listening to punk, industrial and gothic music and founded her first band when she was 13. At the age of 15 she played in a new wave punk band.

== Music career ==
Korch's first contact with the music industry happened when she was 15 and Anke Wendland, a former backing vocalist for Falco, heard her at an open mic performance and hired her as backing singer for Wendland's debut solo album. Shortly after her 16th birthday, Korch signed a contract with Hansa Musik Produktion and began to release disco house under the stage name Eena. Under this name, she released the singles "18 – so what!" and "Gates of Eden". The latter was used in the film Go Trabi Go (1991). In retrospect, she regretted not having opposed the genre the company chose for her.

Under the name Luci van Org, which she has kept using throughout her career, she went on to form the band Lucilectric with Ralf Goldkind, who came from the milieu around the band Einstürzende Neubauten. Lucilectric had a mainstream hit with the song "Mädchen" (lit. 'Girl'), which was released in 1993 and reached second place in the German single chart in 1994. With its playful theme of independence and sexuality, it became an anthem for Germany's Girlie movement, which has been compared to the girly girl, girl power and riot grrrl concepts of the English-speaking world. It has remained what Org is best known for. Another Lucilectric song, "Hey Süßer" (lit. 'Hey sweetie'), also charted in 1994, and the same year the band released its debut album Mädchen. Lucilectric released two more albums—Süß und Gemein (1996, lit. 'Sweet and Mean') and Tiefer (1997, lit. 'Deeper')—before disbanding in 1999. Org said the first album turned out the way the members wanted, but the following albums were "catastrophic" due to compromises, which made her regard artistic freedom as something sacred for her future projects.

Org continued to perform her own music, releasing the solo single "Waterfalls" in 1999, and wrote for other artists including Nena, Nina Hagen, Eisblume, Terrorgruppe and Panda. Her next band, Das Haus von Luci, had its basis in pop music but moved between genres, labelling itself a "Latin–disco–pop–country crossover". It released two albums, Der verbotene Raum (2003, lit. 'The Forbidden Space') and Der Tod wohnt nebenan (2006, lit. 'Death Lives Next Door').

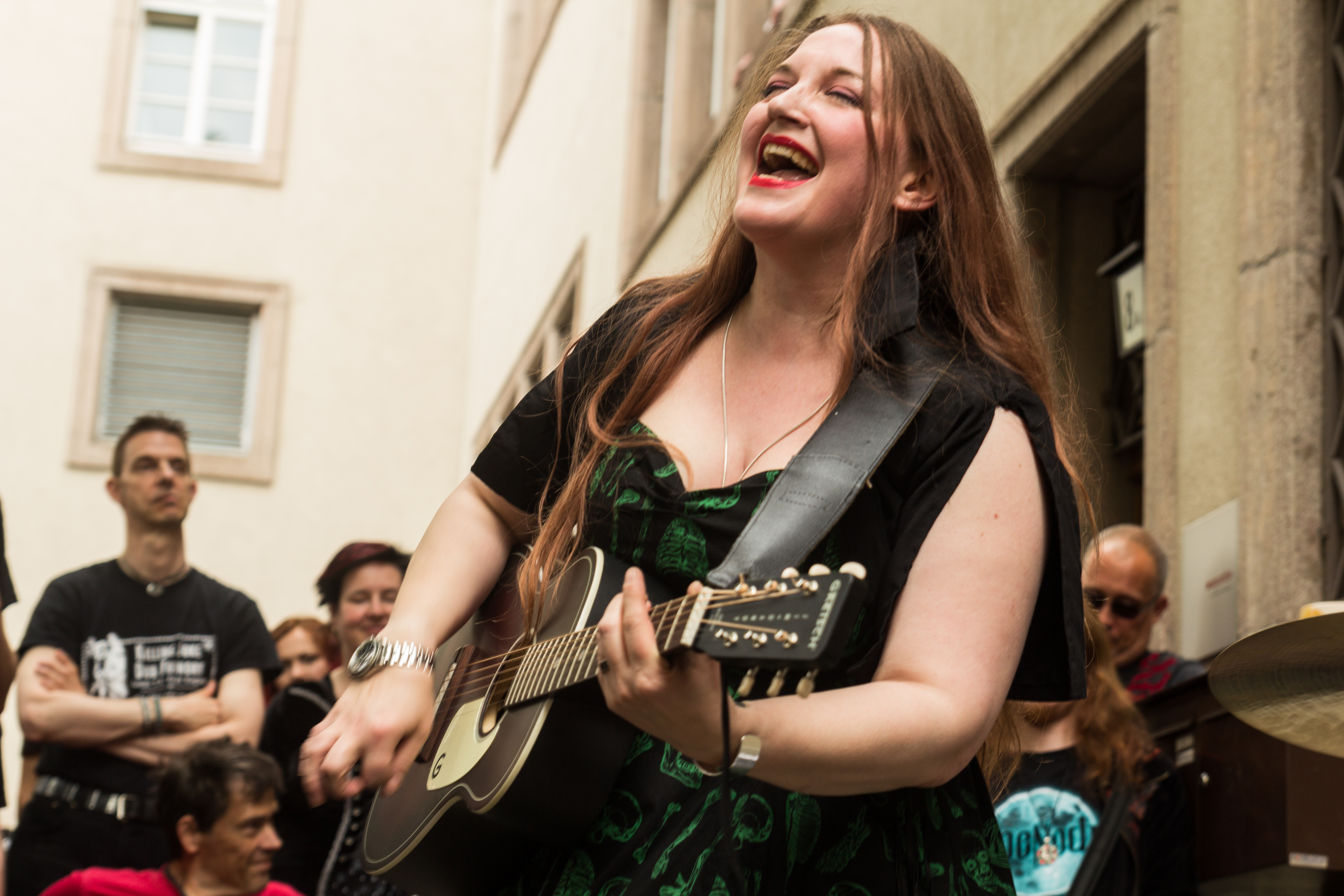
Org with Üebermutter at Wave-Gotik-Treffen 2017

In 2006, Org formed the Neue Deutsche Härte band Üebermutter which released its debut album Unheil! through Roadrunner Records in 2008. Üebermutter is characterised by a satirical use of militaristic and totalitarian aesthetics. It was described by Die Tageszeitung as a "fetish metal project" with "feminist-agitational lyrics".

In 2010, Org created the electropop duo Meystersinger together with Roman Shamov. It has released three albums: Trost (2012, lit. 'Consolation'), Haifischweide (2014, lit. 'Shark Pasture') and Frieden (2017, lit. 'Peace'). In 2020 she launched the solo project Lucina Soteira. Org is featured on Yaenniver's 2022 single "Mädchen, Mädchen", which references Lucilectric's "Mädchen".

== Other works ==
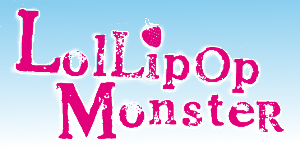
Org co-wrote the film Lollipop Monster.

For several years, Org had her own radio programmes on the Rundfunk Berlin-Brandenburg station Fritz. She has acted in German films and television series, including the 2002 drama film Führer Ex. She debuted as a screenwriter for the television series Notruf Hafenkante in 2007 and has written for ARD television series including In aller Freundschaft and WaPo Bodensee. She co-wrote the feature films Lollipop Monster (2011) and Electric Girl (2019), both directed by Ziska Riemann.

Org has been a columnist for the Berliner Morgenpost. She debuted as a fiction writer with a short story in the 2002 anthology Taxigeschichten (lit. 'Taxi Stories') and published her ghost story collection Der Tod wohnt nebenan in 2006, together with Das Haus von Luci's album of the same name. She wrote the play Die 7 Todsünden oder die Hochzeit der Wetterfee (lit. 'The 7 Deadly Sins or the Weather Fairy's Wedding') which premiered at Berlin's Theater am Kurfürstendamm in 2006. She has written several novels inspired by folklore and stories about Germanic gods. These include the horror story Frau Hölle (lit. 'Lady Hölle') from 2013 and the comedic and feminist Vagina dentata (lit. 'Toothed Vagina') from 2019. Her 2015 novel Schneewittchen und die Kunst des Tötens (lit. 'Snow White and the Art of Killing') is about BDSM, something she has been involved in "on and off". With this book, she wanted to change the public image of the sex-fetish scene created by works such as Fifty Shades of Grey, which she says portrays abuse and mentally broken people rather than "real BDSM". In 2023 she published the autobiographical novel Wir Fünf und ich und die Toten (lit. 'We Five and Me and the Dead'), which is inspired by her childhood.

== Personal life ==
Org married the filmmaker Axel Hildebrand in 2001. The wedding was held in a fetish club. They live in Berlin and have one son. Her legal name is Ina Lucia Hildebrand. She describes herself as bisexual and supports a form of feminism where all tasks should be split evenly between men and women. She became a pagan in 2006 and is responsible for the Berlin South-West section of the Germanic neopagan organisation Eldaring.

== Selected discography ==
| Year | Project | Title | Format | Label | Ref. |
|---|---|---|---|---|---|
| 1990 | Eena | "Gates of Eden" | Single | Hansa Musik Produktion | |
| 1993 | Lucilectric | "Mädchen" | Single | BMG Ariola | |
| 1994 | Lucilectric | Mädchen | Album | BMG Ariola | |
| 1996 | Lucilectric | Süß und Gemein | Album | BMG Ariola | |
| 1997 | Lucilectric | Tiefer | Album | EMI-Electrola | |
| 1999 | Luci van Org | "Waterfalls" | Single | Virtual Volume | |
| 2003 | Das Haus von Luci | Der verbotene Raum | Album | | |
| 2006 | Das Haus von Luci | Der Tod wohnt nebenan | Album | | |
| 2008 | Üebermutter | Unheil! | Album | Roadrunner Records | |
| 2012 | Meystersinger | Trost | Album | | |
| 2014 | Meystersinger | Haifischweide | Album | | |
| 2017 | Meystersinger | Frieden | Album | | |

== Selected filmography ==
| Year | Title | Format | Function | Ref. |
|---|---|---|---|---|
| 1996 | Liane | TV film | Role: Marion Michael | |
| 1999 | Latin Lover | TV film | Role: Evi | |
| 2002 | Führer Ex | Film | Role: Elisabeth | |
| 2007 | Notruf Hafenkante | TV series | Writer | |
| 2007–2010 | In aller Freundschaft | TV series | Writer | |
| 2011 | Lollipop Monster | Film | Role: art teacher; writer | |
| 2019 | Electric Girl | Film | Writer | |
| 2017–2019 | WaPo Bodensee | TV series | Writer | |

== Selected bibliography ==
| Year | Title | Format | Publisher | ISBN | Ref. |
|---|---|---|---|---|---|
| 2006 | Die 7 Todsünden oder die Hochzeit der Wetterfee | Play | —N/a | —N/a | |
| 2006 | Der Tod wohnt nebenan. Spukgeschichten aus der großen Stadt | Short stories | Parthas | ISBN 978-3-86601-599-9 | |
| 2013 | Frau Hölle. Ragnarök' deine Mudda! | Novel | U-Books | ISBN 978-3-939239-82-6 | |
| 2015 | Schneewittchen und die Kunst des Tötens. Spieglein, Spieglein an der Wand, welches ist das fesselndste Märchen im ganzen Land? | Novel | Salax | ISBN 978-3-944154-33-6 | |
| 2019 | Vagina dentata | Novel | Edition Roter Drache | ISBN 978-3-946425-64-9 | |
| 2023 | Wir Fünf und ich und die Toten | Novel | Edition Outbird | ISBN 978-3-948887-51-3 | |
