= Sonne (Farin Urlaub song) =

Single by Farin Urlaub

from the album Am Ende der Sonne
- Released: 5 September 2005
- Genre: Punk rock, emo, hard rock
- Length: 4:40
- Label: Völker hört die Tonträger
- Songwriter(s): Farin Urlaub
- Producer(s): Farin Urlaub

Farin Urlaub singles chronology
"Porzellan" (2005)	"Sonne" (2005)	"Zehn" (2006)

"Sonne" [Sun] is a song by Farin Urlaub. It is the third single and the second track from his album Am Ende der Sonne.

== Video ==
The video is set in the feudal Japan and Farin plays a Japanese man. His wife leaves in the morning from their house. Meanwhile, Farin practices katana, thinks about the beginning of his and his wife's relationship and also meets a foe, whom he defeats. Right after, he discovers, that something is wrong and runs to find his wife, who's been ambushed with her two servants by a group of men. When Farin, gets there, it's too late - everyone is dead. He then finds the killers and avenges his wife. After that, he ends his life by harakiri.

== Track listing ==
1. "Sonne" ("Sun") – 4:40
2. "Gefährlich" ("Dangerous") – 2:58
3. "Hart" ("Tough") – 3:06
4. "Sonne" (Video)
