= Von Thronstahl =

German martial-industrial band

Background information
- Origin: Germany
- Genres: Martial industrial Neofolk; Neoclassical; Industrial rock
- Years active: 1995–2010
- Labels: Fasci-Nation Recordings
- Members: Josef Maria Klumb; Raymond P. Marcel P. Rene

Von Thronstahl was a German band founded in 1995 by Josef Maria Klumb and Bernhard Klumb. It disbanded in 2010.

== Discography ==
=== Albums and EPs ===
- 1998 Sturmzeit (10" Vinyl)
- 2000 Imperium Internum (CD)
- 2001 E Pluribus Unum (CD)
- 2001 Leipzig "Lichttaufe" 2000 (7" Vinyl)
- 2002 Re-Turn Your Revolt Into Style (CD-Box, limited to 500 copies)
- 2003 Bellum, Sacrum Bellum!? (CD)
- 2004 Pessoa/Cioran (CD, with The Days Of The Trumpet Call, limited to 500 copies)
- 2004 Split (with The Days Of The Trumpet Call, limited to 500 (CD) and 300 (Vinyl) copies
- 2006 Mutter der Schmerzen (MCD)
- 2007 Sacrificare (CD-Box / CD)
- 2009 Germanium Metallicum (CD-Box / CD)
- 2010 Conscriptvm (CD)
- 2011 Pan-European Christian Freedom Movement (Split LP with Spreu & Weizen, limited edition of 200)
- 2012 Corona Imperialis (CD)
- 2012 Vivus Romae. Live in Rome 2007/08/09 (Live CD, limited edition of 500)

=== Compilations ===
Von Thronstahl has contributed tracks to tribute albums for Leni Riefenstahl, Julius Evola, Josef Thorak, Corneliu Zelea Codreanu, Hermann Hendrich, and Arno Breker.
