= Sumisu =

Single by Farin Urlaub

from the album Endlich Urlaub!
- Released: 12.11.2001
- Genre: Alternative rock
- Length: 2:14
- Label: Völker hört die Tonträger
- Songwriter: Farin Urlaub
- Producers: Uwe Hoffmann & Farin Urlaub

Farin Urlaub singles chronology
"Glücklich (Farin Urlaub song)" (2001)	"Sumisu" (2001)	"OK" (2002)

"Sumisu" is a song by Farin Urlaub. It is the second single and third track from his debut album Endlich Urlaub!. The song is a homage to the Smiths – according to the lyrics, Farin used to listen to them, when he was down. "Sumisu" ("スミス") is "Smith" in Japanese.

Also, The Cure and New Order are mentioned in the song.

== Video ==
Farin portrays a vampire, who attacks a woman, supposedly in her home. The end is supposed to seem happy. Most scenes are on the basis of or adopted from the 1922 movie Nosferatu by Friedrich Wilhelm Murnau.

The references to the Smiths in the video are:

- Farin plays the album The Queen Is Dead on a grammophone.
- The woman in the video is embroidering something that says "Morrissey San" (Morrissey is a member of the band and "San" is a simple title in the Japanese language).
- Later Rank is shown playing, although the cover features the title "Rankle".

== Track listing ==
1. "Sumisu" – 2:14
2. "Stein des Anstoßes" ("a stone that causes people to stumble") – 5:43 (Family 5 cover)
3. "Buch zum Lesen" ("Book to read") – 1:49
4. "Sumisu" (Video) – 2:56

== Chart performance ==
Chart (2001)	Peak position
Germany (GfK)	60
