= Deutsch-Österreichisches Feingefühl =

Austrian-German pop band

DÖF (Deutsch-Österreichisches Feingefühl), (German-Austrian sensitivity), was a 1980s Austrian-German Neue Deutsche Welle pop band, best known for their 1983 number one hit "Codo … düse im Sauseschritt".

== History ==
It consisted of the Austrian comedians Joesi Prokopetz and Manfred O. "Fredi" Tauchen, and the German new wave music artists Annette Humpe and Inga Humpe. DÖF released only a few songs, which were a mixture of Standard German and Viennese dialect.

Of it the most well-known are on the 1983 LP "DÖF", which sold over 500,000 copies in the German linguistic region.

The band's singles were "Codo … düse im Sauseschritt", "Taxi" (both 1983), and "Uh-uh-uh mir bleibt die Luft weg" (1984). After only a few years, the band members went their own ways.

== Discography ==
=== Album ===
- 1983: DÖF (with Deutsches Mädel and Arafat – „nur einer hat: So sinnliche Lippen wie der Yassir Arafat“)
- 1985: Tag und Nacht (Ur-Mitglieder: with only Manfred Tauchen – together with Raphaela Dell)

=== Singles ===
- 1983: Codo … düse im Sauseschritt
- 1983: Cojdoj - The Flying Schissel
- 1983: Taxi (Textzeile „I steh in da Ködn und woat auf a Taxi, aber ’s kummt net.“)
- 1984: Love Me
- 1984: Uh-Uh-Uh mir bleibt die Luft weg (produced by Stephan Remmler from Trio)
- 1985: Tag und Nacht

== "Codo" ==
Codo (shortened from "Cosmic Dolm"), which is most remembered for its catchy refrain Und ich düse, düse, düse im Sauseschritt, was a major hit in Europe, becoming number one of the charts in Germany, Austria and the Netherlands. The song sold over a million copies, staying at number 1 in the charts for five weeks in Germany. A recording was made in Yinglish language, Cojdoj the flying Schissel, published as B-side of the single "Love Me".

Band members Joesi Prokopetz and Inga Humpe explained the story behind the song:

Codo is an abbreviation for "Cosmic Dolm" or also "Cosmic Depp" (both meaning cosmic idiot). Codo was an extraterrestrial creature without a specific gender, which overcomes hate and brings everything that is missing to us stressed and negatively attuned human beings: a good mood, jokes, charm and above all love.

As Joesi Prokopetz explained in a TV documentary about Austropop in 2006, Codo's international success carried over to the band's other songs as well, so that, inexplicably to him, Taxi (essentially a comedy act in Viennese dialect) remained in the Danish charts for several weeks.

=== Similarities between Codo and the "Buffy theme" ===
Codo contains a chord progression (occasionally hummed by backing singers from 0:50 onwards) that is very similar to the "Buffy theme", the theme song of Buffy the Vampire Slayer, an American TV series that was first aired in the late 1990s.

In 2006, Nerf Herder, the band that composed and performed that tune, said that they had "never heard of Döf", and the similarity was "coincidental". Back in 1999, Nerf Herder lead singer, Parry Grip gave the background on the writing of the melody, the original melody was not written specifically for the show, it had been in place before Whedon contacted the band asking them to submit a demo for a theme tune,

"We did the theme song before the show was on the air. It was a song that had already been written, but we really didn't know where to take it. I had some ideas - it was originally going to have some kind of science-fiction theme, which is weird, because we don't do songs like that. I remember having the title of 'Outer Space Rock' or something like that; that was a working thing."
