= Krieg (song) =

Single by Farin Urlaub Racing Team

from the album Die Wahrheit übers Lügen
- Released: 1 May 2009 as download 2 May 2009 as CD
- Genre: Alternative rock
- Length: 3:15
- Label: Völker hört die Tonträger
- Songwriter: Farin Urlaub
- Producer: Farin Urlaub

Farin Urlaub Racing Team singles chronology
"Niemals" (2009)	"Krieg" (2009)	"Zu heiß" (2010)

"Krieg" (War) is a song by Farin Urlaub Racing Team. It's the third single and the fifth track from the album Die Wahrheit übers Lügen. The song's themes are commercialism, character of big city people, supply and demand and dominating disposition to anger.

The song is sung in the perspective of a man from a big city, who decides to go shopping during a discount, however the demand is higher than supply, which leads to a fight for the products. In the second verse, the man is driving in his new car and a man behind him drives anxiously, flashes lights and honks the horn, probably trying to get past, to which the protagonist replies that he might not have many emotions (maybe three), but anger and wrath are two of them, so again a fight ensues.

== Music video ==
The video is set in New York City and features FURT playing only on a TV set on a window display of an electronics shop. The plot revolves around two living statues, of whose the second shown sets up a place right next to the first one and they start competing in a comical manner, which eventually leads to a weird mime-fight between them, until the "intruder" squirts the protagonist with a water pistol. The protagonist seemingly quits and leaves to get a hot dog, but soon returns and squirts the other with ketchup and mustard, which makes the intruder chase the protagonist.

== Track listing ==
1. "Krieg"
2. "Ein-Personen-Aufstand" (One person revolt)
3. "Krieg (in New York)" (Video)
4. "Krieg (auf der Bühne)" (Video) (On the stage)

== Charts ==
Chart (2009)	Peak position
Germany (GfK)	49
