= Am Ende der Sonne =

Studio album by Farin Urlaub
- Released: 29 March 2005
- Recorded: at Nagelstudio
- Genre: Punk rock Rock; Ska punk
- Length: 56:48
- Label: Völker hört die Tonträger
- Producer: Farin Urlaub

Farin Urlaub chronology
Endlich Urlaub! (2001)	Am Ende der Sonne (2005)	Livealbum of Death (2006)

Am Ende der Sonne is the second solo album of the German musician Farin Urlaub, released in 2005. The title translates to At Sun's end.

== Track listing ==
All songs written by Farin Urlaub.

1. "Mehr" (More) – 3:14
  - "Noch einmal" (Once again) is hidden in the pregap of "Mehr", hearable by rewinding to – 4:42.
2. "Sonne" (Sun) – 4:40
3. "Augenblick" (The moment, lit. the blink of an eye) – 3:08
4. "Porzellan" (Porcelain) – 3:52
5. "Unter Wasser" (Underwater) – 4:02
6. "Wie ich den Marilyn-Manson-Ähnlichkeitswettbewerb verlor" (How I lost the Marilyn Manson look-alike contest) – 3:12
7. "Unsichtbar" (Invisible) – 3:14
8. "Apocalypse wann anders" (Apocalypse some other day) – 4:02
9. "Schon wieder" (Done again) – 1:19
10. "Immer noch" (Still) – 4:38
11. "Alle dasselbe" (All the same) – 3:28
12. "Kein Zurück" (No return) – 4:54
13. "Dermitder" (Hewiththe) – 4:03
14. "Dusche" (Shower) – 4:12
  - On the vinyl version "Noch einmal" is a hidden track after "Dusche".

Note: Track 6 is titled "Wie ich den Farin-Urlaub-Ähnlichkeitswettbewerb gewann" (How I won the Farin Urlaub look-alike contest) in the CD-Text.

== Singles ==
2005: "Dusche"
2005: "Porzellan"
2005: "Sonne"

== Personnel ==
- Farin Urlaub (guitar, vocals, bass, drums)
- Peter Quintern (saxophone)
- R. S. Göhring (sackbut)
- Hans-Jörg Fischer (saxophone)
- Hardy Appich (trumpet)
- Lioudmila (cello in "Dusche")
- Ralf Hübner (violin in "Dusche")
- Rachel Rep (drums in "Noch einmal")

== Charts ==
=== Weekly charts ===
Chart (2005)	Peak position
Austrian Albums (Ö3 Austria)	2
German Albums (Offizielle Top 100)	1
Swiss Albums (Schweizer Hitparade)	20

=== Year-end charts ===
Chart (2005)	Position
Austrian Albums (Ö3 Austria)	60
German Albums (Offizielle Top 100)	36
