= Ideal (German band) =

German Neue Deutsche Welle music group

- Origin: Berlin, Germany
- Genre: Neue Deutsche Welle
- Years active: 1980–1983
- Members: Annette Humpe, Ernst Ulrich Deuker, Frank Jürgen Krüger (died 2007), Hans-Joachim Behrendt (died 2023)

Ideal was one of the more successful German Neue Deutsche Welle music groups. It is best known for the songs "Blaue Augen" (Blue Eyes), "Berlin", and "Monotonie" (Monotony).

== History ==
In 1980, Annette Humpe, Ernst Ulrich Deuker, Frank Jürgen "Eff Jott" Krüger and Hans-Joachim "Hansi" Behrendt formed the band "Ideal". Annette Humpe had played previously in the band Neonbabies alongside her sister Inga Humpe, before forming Ideal. Eff Jott Krüger previously played for the X-Pectors. In May 1980, Ideal released their first single on Eitel-Imperial—their own record label—entitled "Wir stehn auf Berlin" / "Männer gibt's wie Sand am Meer", which soon sold out. The British rock band Barclay James Harvest—who were particularly successful in Germany—performed a free open-air concert on 30 August 1980 in front of the Reichstag building. The 150,000 visitors also saw Ideal, as they were booked as an opening act; this was a large step toward mainstream popularity.

In November, Ideal released their self-titled album on the Innovative Communication label. The album reached number three on the German charts. Oddly enough for an LP, it was supposed to be played at 45 rpm, the speed intended for singles and which results in improved sound quality. This was not done with subsequent releases. This was followed by concerts in Switzerland and Austria. In August 1981, Ideal played in front of 22,000 fans at the Waldbühne Berlin. This was broadcast nationwide by SFB as part of Rocknacht. Following this, the band began recording a second album. Together with the help of producer Conny Plank and engineer Dave Hutchins, they produced "Der Ernst des Lebens", which was released in October 1981. At the same time, Ideal's debut album went gold, and marked the first time an album released on an independent record label went gold.

Ideal performed 27 sold-out concerts during their 1981/1982 tour through German-speaking countries. By their final concert on the tour, they had received another gold record, this time for "Der Ernst des Lebens." In the fall of 1982, Ideal produced their third album, "Bi Nuu", under the direction of Micki Meuser. It entered the chart in December 1982, but only peaked at 20th place; these sales did not meet the expectations of the record label and a planned tour was cancelled.

In 1982 they made the music for Rosa von Praunheim's film Red Love.

On 31 March 1983, Ideal sent an announcement to the media via Telex: "The group Ideal is dissolving. From the beginning, Ideal was planned as a project, a corporation, which was intended to exist as long as the differences between the individual members made the work enjoyable and creative. Our music was always a result of the clashing of four different personalities, not of compromise, but of creating songs that all enjoyed. In three terrific years, we have gotten the best out of this constellation." June 1983 saw the release of "Zugabe" (Encore), a live album of "remembrance, farewells, and gratitude for all the fans".

Some of the members of the band (Ernst Ulrich Deuker, Frank Jürgen "Eff Jott" Krüger and Hans-Joachim "Hansi" Behrendt) helped fellow German band Alphaville record their 1989 album, The Breathtaking Blue. They contributed to five of the songs from that album.

On 26 April 2007, Frank Jürgen Krüger died following a long fight with cancer. He was 58. Drummer Hans-Joachim Behrendt died on 27 February 2023, at the age of 68.

== Discography ==
=== Albums ===
All titles are group compositions.

- Ideal (1980)
1. Berlin - 3:09
2. Irre (Crazy) - 3:54
3. Telepathie (Telepathy) - 5:27
4. Blaue Augen (Blue Eyes) - 3:27
5. Hundsgemein (Rotten) - 2:14
6. Luxus (Luxury) - 4:03
7. Rote Liebe (Red Love) - 2:36
8. Da leg' ich mich doch lieber hin (I'd rather lie down there though!) - 4:28
9. Telephon (Telephone) - 3:24
10. Roter Rolls Royce (Red Rolls Royce) - 3:15
- Der Ernst des Lebens (The Severity of Life) (1981)
1. Eiszeit (Ice Age) - 2:53
2. Schwein (Pig) - 3:00
3. Sex in der Wüste (Sex in the Desert) - 3:38
4. Herrscher (Ruler) - 3:41
5. Feuerzeug (Lighter) - 4:19
6. Immer frei (Always Free) - 2:27
7. Erschießen (Shot down) - 3:40
8. Monotonie (Monotony) - 4:44
9. Ich kann nicht schlafen (I Can't Sleep) - 3:32
10. Spannung (Tension) - 3:00
11. Spion (Spy) - 5:00
- Bi Nuu (1982)
1. Keine Heimat (No Homeland) - 3:29
2. Ask Mark Ve Ölüm - 2:59
3. Tränen am Hafen (Tears at the Harbour) - 4:45
4. Schöne Frau mit Geld (Pretty Woman With Money) - 3:02
5. Die zweite Sonne (The Second Sun) - 3:07
6. Wir zerstören unser Glück (We're Destroying Our Own Happiness) - 3:31
7. Leiden und Wissenschaft (Suffering and Science) - 3:48
8. Ich bin nervös (I'm Nervous) - 2:15
9. Ganz in Gummi (All in Rubber) - 2:17
10. Müde (Tired) - 5:49
- Zugabe (Encore) (1983)

=== Compilations ===
- Eitel Optimal - Das Beste (Vainly Optimal - The Best) (1992)
- Monotonie (2000)
- Eiszeit (2000)
