= Inga Humpe =

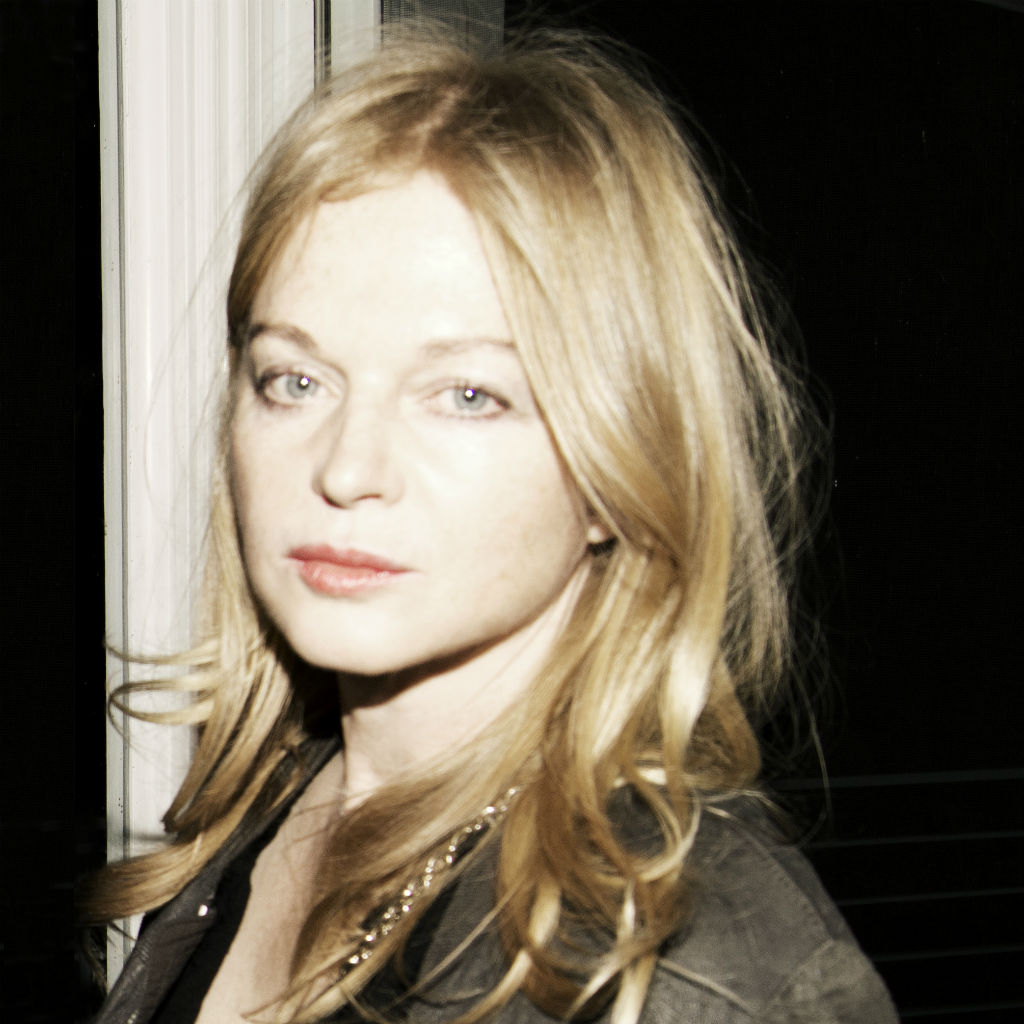
- Humpe in 2013

Background information
- Born: 13 January 1956 (age 70); Hagen, West Germany
- Genres: Pop; rock; NDW
- Occupations: Singer; songwriter; producer
- Instruments: Vocals; keyboards
- Years active: 1979–present
- Member of: 2raumwohnung
- Formerly of: Neonbabies; DÖF; Humpe & Humpe
- Website: 2raumwohnung.de

Inga Humpe (born 13 January 1956) is a German singer, songwriter and producer. She performed with Neue Deutsche Welle bands such as Neonbabies, DÖF and Humpe & Humpe. Her sister is the singer and producer Annette Humpe, with whom she performed regularly during her career. The song "Riding into Blue (Cowboy Song)" produced by Trevor Horn became a minor hit in 1990. Later that year she released a solo studio album Planet Oz. She currently is in the band 2raumwohnung and lives in Berlin.

== Career ==
In 1979 Humpe founded the band Neonbabies together with her sister Annette in Berlin. In 1981 the band released a self-titled album featuring Inga on lead-vocals. Her sister left to form the band Ideal prior to the release. After two further German-language albums, the band folded in 1983. In the same year, she featured on the self-titled DÖF album produced by Annette that spawned the single "Codo" featuring her vocals.

In 1984, she featured and co-produced the Palais Schaumburg album Parlez-vous Schaumburg with Gareth Jones. The following year, she rejoined her sister to form the duo Humpe & Humpe and released a self-titled album which contained the single "Yamaha". The song was particularly successful in Japan during 1985, and it was released with a memorable split-screen video featuring the sisters. In 1987, they released the new wave/pop oriented album Swimming with Sharks in the English language. At this time, they were marketed outside Germany (mainly in the UK market) without the bandname Humpe and Humpe as it was felt it would cause confusion, so the bandname was changed to Swimming with Sharks as well. Two songs were released as singles from this album, "Careless Love" and "No Longer Friends"; the former received significant airplay on BBC Radio One during 1987 and strong reviews from British music press, although this did not eventuate in significant Chart success for the sisters.

As international success remained elusive, the duo went their separate ways, with Annette concentrating on production. To further her career, Inga moved to England where she worked a guest vocalist for Johnny Logan and Howard Jones.

Humpe's first solo album was released in 1990 under the title Planet Oz, where she collaborated with a number of producers and writers. It included the single "Riding into Blue (Cowboy Song)", written and produced by Trevor Horn. She also worked with Thomas Fehlman and Andy Richards and recorded covers of "Somethin' Stupid" and the Pet Shop Boys' "Do I Have To". In 1995 she had returned to Germany and rejoined her sister as the duo Bamby and released the album Wall of Sugar.

Throughout her career, Humpe often featured as a guest vocalist, notably on recordings by the artists Stephan Remmler, Falco and Marc Almond. She also co-wrote a number of songs for others, including "Automatic Love" for Kylie Minogue. In 2000 she formed the duo 2raumwohnung with her life partner Tommi Eckart, with whom she has been producing mostly electronic music in Germany.

In 2019, she published the co-authored book Wir trafen uns in einem Garten with photographs, biographical details and song lyrics.
