= Josef Maria Klumb =

German musician (born 1962)

Josef Maria Klumb (born 1962 in Bingen am Rhein) is a German musician who has been a member of a number of punk rock, industrial, and darkwave bands in the "dark culture". He is best known for his work with Forthcoming Fire and Von Thronstahl.

Klumb founded the punk-rock band Aus-98 in the early 1980s, which fairly quickly morphed into Circle of Sig-Tiu. Here he met Raymond P., with whom he would later collaborate in Von Thronstahl. By the mid-1980s, Circle of Sig-Tiu began incorporating gothic rock and darkwave aspects; the band broke up in 1988. During its career, the band gained some notoriety for its symbolism, not least for its use of the sig and tiu runes when spelling its name.

In 1990, Klumb formed Forthcoming Fire, a more outright darkwave band with danceable elements. The band enjoyed some popularity in the early 1990s German darkwave scene. The band later began moving away from darkwave, and became somewhat less popular.

In 1995, Klumb, along with his brother Burn (also from Forthcoming Fire) formed Von Thronstahl, a martial industrial group. Later Burn would leave the group and instead former Circle of Sig-Tiu bandmate Raymond P., Marcel P., and Rene joined.

Klumb has also been a member of the bands Weissglut, Svantaal and Preussak.
