= Max Raabe =

German singer (born 1962)

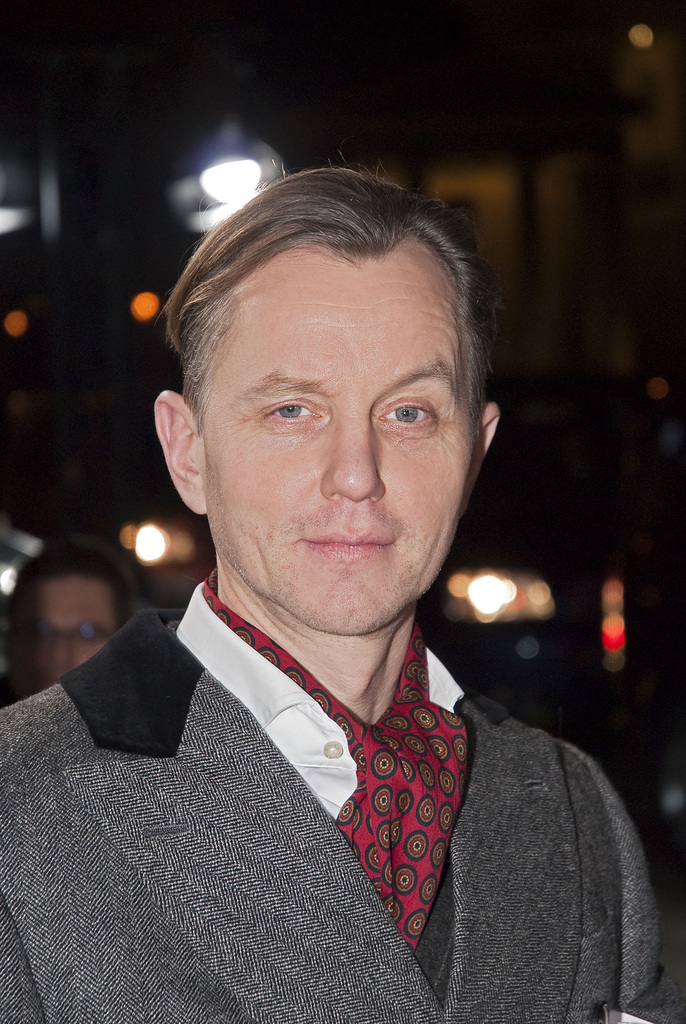
- Raabe in 2008

Background information
- Born: Matthias Otto; 12 December 1962 (age 63); Lünen, North Rhine-Westphalia, West Germany
- Genres: Cabaret, comedy, old style, orchestra, jazz, swing
- Instruments: Vocals, orchestra
- Years active: 1985–present
- Website: palast-orchester

Max Raabe (born Matthias Otto, 12 December 1962) is a German jazz singer. He is best known as the founder and leader of the Palast Orchester.

== Career ==
Raabe developed an interest in the sound of German dance and film music of the 1920s and 1930s, such as the songs of the Comedian Harmonists, from seeing old films on television and from his parents' record collection. He formally studied music at the Berlin University of the Arts, intending originally to become a baritone opera singer. He and eleven other students formed the Palast Orchester in 1985. The ensemble initially used music arrangements that Raabe found at various flea markets.

The orchestra practised these arrangements for one year without any public engagements or performances. The orchestra first performed publicly at the 1987 Berliner Theaterball, in the lobby as a secondary act, but with such success that the audience left the ballroom to hear the orchestra's performance in the lobby. Raabe and the Palast Orchester had a hit with his 1992 original, Schlager-styled song "Kein Schwein ruft mich an" ("Nobody ever calls me", almost literal translation: "No pig calls me"), a pop song in 1920s style.

In addition to covers of vintage music, Raabe writes original songs and music, including film music. He and the orchestra have also created covers of modern pop songs in a 1920–1930s band style, including songs by ABBA, Britney Spears, Tom Jones, and Salt'n'Pepa.

Raabe has also made a number of cameo appearances as a stereotypical 1920s and 1930s singer and entertainer in a number of films by German directors, such as Der bewegte Mann (1994; English title "Maybe, Maybe Not"), Werner Herzog's Invincible (2001), and Wenzel Storch's Die Reise ins Glück (2004). His live theatre performances include a 1994 appearance as Dr. Siedler in the Berlin "Bar jeder Vernunft" version of The White Horse Inn, and 1999 performances as Mack the Knife in Kurt Weill and Bertolt Brecht's The Threepenny Opera alongside Nina Hagen.

Raabe first performed in the USA in Los Angeles in 2004. In 2005, he performed his first concert in New York City's Carnegie Hall and returned for subsequent engagements with the Palast Orchester in 2007 and 2010. In 2011, Raabe produced an album, Küssen kann man nicht alleine (You cannot kiss alone), with former new-wave musician and producer Annette Humpe, who also wrote the lyrics. His latest album, also with Humpe, is Für Frauen ist das kein Problem ("It's no problem for women"), released in 2013.

In 2022, Raabe made an appearance as himself in the 1920s neo-noir series Babylon Berlin, in which he performed a single titled Ein Tag wie Gold.

== Discography ==
- Die Männer sind schon die Liebe wert (1988, Monopol)
- Kleines Fräulein, einen Augenblick (1989, Monopol)
- Ich hör' so gern Musik (1991, Monopol)
- Live im Wintergarten (1992, Monopol)
- Dort tanzt Lu-Lu! (1994, Monopol)
- Bel Ami (1995, Monopol)
- Music, Maestro, Please (1996, Monopol)
- Die größten Erfolge (1996, Monopol)
- Mein kleiner grüner Kaktus (1997, Monopol)
- Tanz-Gala (1997, Monopol)
- Ein Freund, ein guter Freund (1999, RCA Local/Sony Music)
- Junger Mann im Frühling (1999, Monopol)
- Krokodile und andere Hausfreunde (2000, RCA Local/Sony Music)
- Ich wollt ich wär ein Huhn (2001, RCA Local/Sony Music)
- Charming Weill (2001, RCA Local/Sony Music)
- Superhits (2001, RCA Local/Sony Music)
- Vom Himmel hoch, Da Komm' Ich Her (2002, RCA Local/Sony Music)
- Superhits Nummer 2 (2002, RCA Local/Sony Music)
- Palast Revue (2003, Warner Special Music)
- Max Raabe singt (2005, Monopol/Sony Music Austria)
- Wochenend & Sonnenschein (2006, RCA Local/Sony Music)
- Komm, lass uns einen kleinen Rumba tanzen (2006, Warner Special Music)
- Advent (2006, RCA Local/Sony Music)
- In Der Bar (2008, Sony BMG Music)
- Heute Nacht Oder Nie (Tonight or Never) (2008, SPV)
- Übers Meer (2010, Decca/Universal)
- Küssen kann man nicht alleine (2011, Decca) (with Annette Humpe)
- Für Frauen ist das kein Problem (2013, Decca) (with Annette Humpe)
- Für Frauen ist das kein Problem – Zugabe Edition (2013, Decca) (with Annette Humpe)
- The Golden Age (2013, Decca)
- Eine Nacht in Berlin (2014, We Love Music)
- Der perfekte Moment... wird heut verpennt (2017, We Love Music) (with Annette Humpe & Peter Plate)
- MTV Unplugged (2019, Deutsche Grammophon GmbH, Berlin)
- Wer hat hier schlechte Laune (2022, We Love Music)
- Mir is so nach dir (2023, We Love Music)
