= Ernst Ulrich Deuker =

German musician

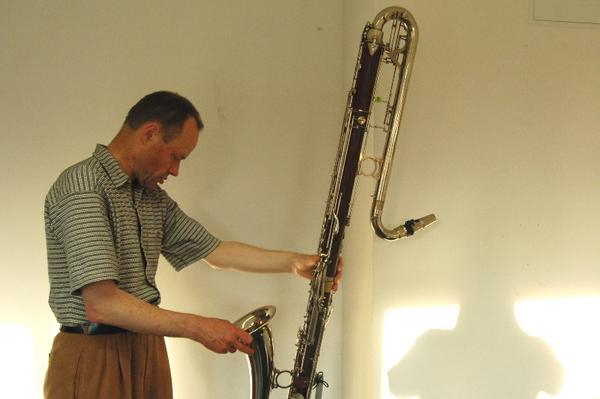
Deuker with a contrabass clarinet

Ernst Ulrich Deuker (born 13 July 1954) is a bass player and contrabass clarinet player. He became known with the band Ideal.

Deuker was born in Trier, West Germany. In 1968 he received his first electric bass. At the beginning of the 1970s he founded with his brother Martin the political rock band Linkerton in Berlin. In 1979 was the first meeting of the Neue Deutsche Welle formation Ideal. 1980 the first album Ideal came out. 1981 the record producer Conny Plank produced the album Der Ernst des Lebens. Tours and festivals followed include (Montreux Jazz Festival and Roskilde Festival 1982) as well as various television appearances. The band broke up in early 1983. In 1982, after attending a concert by Howard Johnson, Deuker discovered his interest for the contrabass clarinet. He needed two years to obtain a suitable copy of this unusual instrument. Since the early 2000s he worked closely as a contrabass-clarinetist with jazz musicians. 2004 Deuker was also frontman, singer, guitarist and contrabass clarinetist of the avant-pop project "EU COMMISSION (Album Night Songs, at Below Recordings). Since 2009 he is playing in the Deep Down Clarinet Duo with Theo Jörgensmann and, with young musicians, in the progressive funk rock band ffunkoff. Further actual music projects are: the improvising Bartók ensemble Affaere Bela B., with saxophonist/clarinetist Edith Steyer, and personen (4), with his nephew Christian Hohenbild (dr, synth), Stefan Dittmar (gtr), and Ole Tholen (as). in 2016 Deuker published two books, an educational book about improvisation, On the Way to a Grammar of Free Musical Speech, and, together with the artist and book illustrator Gabo, the black humour graphic novel Adam Marody.
