= Farin Urlaub =

German rock musician

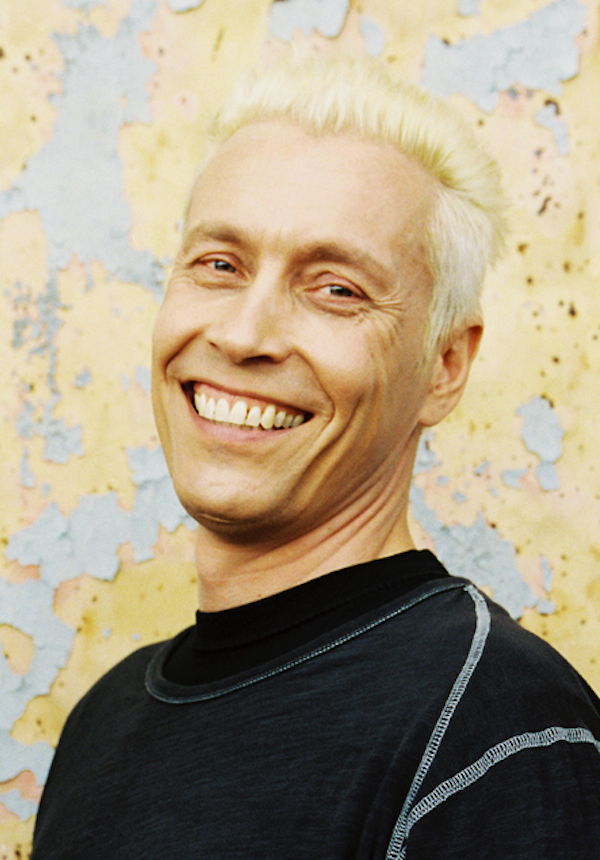
- Farin Urlaub in 2012

Background information
- Born: Jan Vetter; 27 October 1963 (age 63); West Berlin, West Germany
- Genres: Punk rock, pop punk, pop rock
- Occupations: Musician, singer, songwriter
- Instruments: Vocals, guitar, bass guitar
- Years active: 1980–present
- Member of: Die Ärzte; Farin Urlaub Racing Team
- Formerly of: King Køng
- Website: farin-urlaub.de

Jan Vetter (born 27 October 1963), better known as Farin Urlaub (from the German Fahr in Urlaub!, "Go on holiday!"), is a German singer, guitarist and songwriter. He is best known as the guitarist/vocalist for punk rock band Die Ärzte. He has also been a solo artist since 2001, touring with his band, the Farin Urlaub Racing Team. His releases starting in 2006 are credited to the band.

== Biography ==
Vetter was born on 27 October 1963 in West Berlin. Until the age of seven, he lived with his mother in a flat in Berlin's Moabit district, and then in Frohnau until he was 18. His parents were low-income civil servants, and he has a younger half-sister named Julia. His mother often played records by The Beatles, and Vetter was introduced to music at a young age.

When he was nine, Vetter decided to take guitar lessons with an elderly woman who taught him classical standards. He played guitar while visiting holiday camps. A later music teacher advised him: "Whatever you do when you grow up, don't do anything with music!". At the age of 16, Vetter went on a school trip to London, and returned home as a punk with dyed blonde hair.

In 1980, he met Dirk Felsenheimer (later known as Bela B) at the club Ballhaus Spandau, one of the few clubs in West Berlin that occasionally played punk rock. Vetter joined Felsenheimer's band Soilent Grün, replacing the previous guitar player whose guitar had been stolen. When it was time to come up with stage names, Vetter decided to refer to his favourite hobby of travelling, contracting the German phrase "Fahr in Urlaub" ("Go on holiday") to Farin Urlaub. After completing his Abitur in 1981, Vetter enrolled in archaeology at the Free University of Berlin, but soon quit his studies to focus on his musical career.

In addition to German, the 1.94-meter-tall Urlaub speaks English, French, Portuguese, Latin, and Japanese.

== Career ==
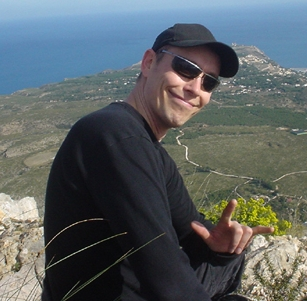
Farin Urlaub on holiday in Spain, 2003

After the breakup of Soilent Grün in 1982, Urlaub, Felsenheimer, and Hans Runge (Sahnie) formed Die Ärzte. Urlaub told the youth magazine Bravo that his surname was Vetter-Marciniak to find out which of his fans really knew him well; fan mail addressed to "Jan Vetter-Marciniak" he would throw out unread. Even today his surname is often erroneously cited as "Vetter-Marciniak".

In 1988, at the height of their popularity, Urlaub and Felsenheimer decided to split up, and after one final tour with the new bass-player, Hagen Liebing, Die Ärzte disbanded.

In 1989, Urlaub formed King Køng with, among others, drummer Uwe Hoffmann, who had been Die Ärzte's producer. Urlaub called himself "Jan" during this time, as he wanted to distance himself from his time with Die Ärzte. The group was never successful, and Urlaub declared it defunct in 1999.

Bela's band Depp Jones was not really successful either, so in 1993 they decided to reform Die Ärzte. They invited former Depp Jones guitarist Rodrigo González to take over bass duties. They released the comeback album Die Bestie in Menschengestalt ("The Beast in Human Form") and the single "Schrei nach Liebe" ("Cry for Love")

In 2001, Urlaub started his solo career with the album Endlich Urlaub! (literally translated meaning "Finally Holiday!", but also a pun on his pseudonym, "Urlaub"). On "Endlich Urlaub", Urlaub plays all the instruments himself, except for the strings and wind instruments. Live, however, he is primarily a lead singer and guitarist. Am Ende der Sonne ("At the End of the Sun") was released in 2005, followed by Livealbum of Death in 2006. The next album he chose to release under the name Farin Urlaub Racing Team, after the band playing alongside him when performing live. The next album titled Die Wahrheit übers Lügen ("The Truth About Lying") was released on 31 October 2008. His most recent studio album, Faszination Weltraum ("Outer Space Fascination"), was released in 2014, as well as a second live compilation album, Danger!, in 2015.

Besides Urlaub's solo career, Die Ärzte continued to release. In November 2007, their album, Jazz ist anders ("Jazz is different") was released and was ranked No. 1 in the German Media Control Charts for six consecutive weeks. It was followed by auch ("also") in April 2012 and Hell in October 2020, with Urlaub playing a large role in both in addition to his solo work.

== Musical style ==
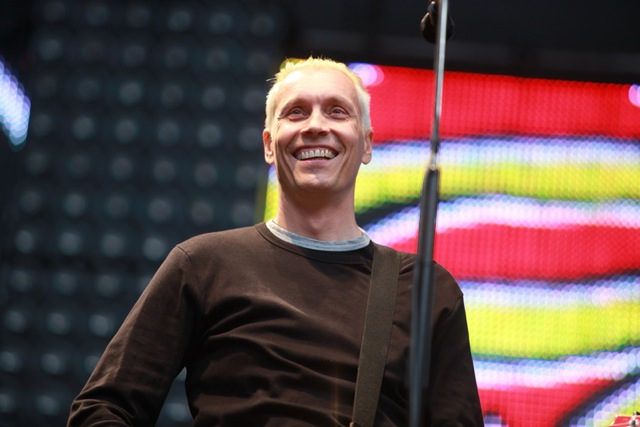
Farin Urlaub in 2013

Since his childhood, Urlaub has been influenced by The Beatles and Frank Zappa. In addition, he listens to Johnny Cash, Depeche Mode, and "more or less everything except free jazz and techno." He has stated that he does not consider himself to be a particularly good guitarist. He says that he often plays "unclean" chords and that he has only a very limited ability to read music, although this has not affected his success as a musician. Urlaub is familiar with many styles ranging from punk to rock, funk (Deine Freundin), ska (Dermitder), reggae, dancehall, country and even, albeit in a jocular manner, in Volkstümliche Musik (Wenn es Abend wird).

According to some reports, the difference between the songs Urlaub has written solo and those he has written for Die Ärzte is that his solo pieces are more personal and topical. He tried to make his songs for Die Ärzte as "timeless" and funny as possible, influenced by the Comedian Harmonists. Many of his songs are about being left by one's partner (Zu spät (Too late), Wegen dir (Because of you), Wie am ersten Tag (Like on the first day), Komm zurück (Come back), Nie gesagt (Never told you), OK, 1000 Jahre schlechten Sex (1000 years of bad sex), Nichts in der Welt (Nothing in the world)) or are just nonsense (Buddy Holly's Brille (Buddy Holly's glasses), Außerirdische (Extraterrestrials), WAMMW (Abbreviation for Wenn alle Männer Mädchen wären — If all men were girls)).

Since the reunion of Die Ärzte, Urlaub has also written socially critical and political songs (Kopfüber in die Hölle (Headfirst into hell), Schrei nach Liebe (Cry for love), Schunder-Song, Der Misanthrop, Rebell, Deine Schuld (Your fault), Nicht allein (Not alone)).

Whereas his first solo album contained several very satirical texts, Am Ende der Sonne deals with more serious themes such as politics, social criticism, and personal subjects. In some solo pieces, Urlaub also shows some tendency towards ska punk (Dermitder ("The Guy With The", contextually, "der Mann mit der Posaune" — the man with the trombone), 1000 Jahre schlechten Sex (1000 years of bad sex)).

Live, he does not play guitar in all songs, but often swaps his guitar with Die Ärzte bass guitarist Rodrigo González in songs Urlaub finds too hard to play on guitar.

== Farin Urlaub Racing Team ==
The Farin Urlaub Racing Team (abbreviated to "FURT") is the band with whom Urlaub performs his solo work. So far, he has completed four tours with the band. He describes the difference between Die Ärzte and the Farin Urlaub Racing Team as follows: "With Die Ärzte, complete anarchy dominates on stage, whereas with the Racing Team you have an orchestra full of dynamite."

== Discography ==
=== Solo ===
Albums

Year	Title	Translation	Chart positions		
Year	Title	Translation	GER	AUT	SWI
2001	Endlich Urlaub!	Finally Holiday!	3	28	85
2005	Am Ende der Sonne	At the End of the Sun	1	2	20
2017	Berliner Schule	School of Berlin	5	24	29
2026	Ein Lächeln im Gesicht	A Smile on the Face	1	-	-

Singles

Year	Title	Translation	Chart positions			Album
Year	Title	Translation	GER	AUT	SWI	Album
2001	"Glücklich"	Happy	30	61	–	Endlich Urlaub!
2001	"Sumisu"		60	–	–	Endlich Urlaub!
2002	"OK"		32	–	–	Endlich Urlaub!
2002	"Phänomenal egal"	Phenomenally Indifferent	44	–	–	Endlich Urlaub!
2005	"Dusche"	Shower	13	28	53	Am Ende der Sonne
2005	"Porzellan"	Porcelain	24	46	91	Am Ende der Sonne
2005	"Sonne"	Sun	27	49	–	Am Ende der Sonne

=== Farin Urlaub Racing Team ===
Albums

Year	Title	Translation	Chart positions		
Year	Title	Translation	GER	AUT	SWI
2006	Livealbum of Death		1	4	31
2008	Die Wahrheit übers Lügen	The Truth About Lying	2	5	12
2014	Faszination Weltraum	Outer Space Fascination	1	3	6
2015	Danger!		5	35	—

Singles

Year	Title	Translation	Chart positions			Album
Year	Title	Translation	GER	AUT	SWI	Album
2006	"Zehn"	Ten	14	19	82	Livealbum of Death
2008	"Nichimgriff"	Notundercontrol	26	29	81	Die Wahrheit übers Lügen
2009	"Niemals"	Never	28	56	–	Die Wahrheit übers Lügen
2009	"Krieg"	War	49	–	–	Die Wahrheit übers Lügen
2010	"Zu heiß"	Too Hot	59	–	–	Die Wahrheit übers Lügen
2014	"Herz? Verloren"	Heart? Lost	12	49	–	Faszination Weltraum
2014	"AWG"		32	–	–	Faszination Weltraum
2015	"iDisco"		22	–	–	Faszination Weltraum

=== Soilent Grün ===
With Dirk Felsenheimer, Roman Stoyloff and others.

=== Collaborations ===
- "Requiem für Nossek" (1989) - The Incredible Hagen feat. Jan Vetter & Bela B; for the soundtrack of Lindenstraße, titled "Wir warten auf die Lindenstraße"
- "Wir brauchen... Werner" (1990) - Bela B & Jan; for the soundtrack of Werner – Beinhart!
- "Donna Clara" (1995) - as Kill Kill Gaskrieg (The Bates featuring Bela B & Kill Kill Gaskrieg); for the album Pleasure + Pain
- "Du bist hübsch, Kati" (1995) - for Heinz Strunk's album Der Mettwurstpapst
- Backing vocals for songs "Monster", "Ohne Traurigkeit" and "Meer" on Fleischmann's 1995 album Hunger
- Like This and "Liebe macht blind" (2000) - The Busters feat. Farin Urlaub, for the Busters' 2001 album 360°
- Backing singer on "Hey du" by the Beatsteaks on the Wohnzimmer EP (2002)
- Backing vocals on "Bettmensch" on Olli Schulz & der Hund Marie's album Das beige Album as K. K. Blitzkrieg

== Literature ==
- Farin Urlaub: Unterwegs 1 - Indien & Bhutan. Bildband, Schwarzkopf & Schwarzkopf, Berlin 2007, ISBN 978-3-89602-779-5.
- Farin Urlaub: "Unterwegs 2 - Australien & Osttimor". Bildband, Schwarzkopf & Schwarzkopf, Berlin 2011, ISBN 978-3862650620.
- Farin Urlaub: "AFRIKA Unterwegs 3: Vom Mittelmeer zum Golf von Guinea & Unterwegs 4: Vom Golf von Guinea nach Sansibar", Berlin 2015, ISBN 978-3-86265-485-7.
- Karg, Markus (2001). Die Ärzte - Ein überdimensionales Meerschwein frisst die Erde auf. Berlin: Schwarzkopf & Schwarzkopf. ISBN 3-89602-369-1.
- Stefan Üblacker: "Das Buch ä: Die von die ärzte autorisierte Biografie". Schwarzkopf & Schwarzkopf, Berlin 2016, ISBN 3862655857.
