= Riding into Blue (Cowboy Song) =

1990 song by Inga

Single by Inga

from the album Planet Oz
- B-side: "I Get Along"
- Released: 18 June 1990
- Length: 3:43
- Label: East West
- Songwriter(s): Trevor Horn
- Producer(s): Trevor Horn

Inga singles chronology
"Something Stupid" (1989)	"Riding into Blue (Cowboy Song)" (1990)	"Do I Have To" (1991)

"Riding into Blue (Cowboy Song)" is a song by the German singer Inga Humpe, released by East West on 18 June 1990 as the second single from her debut solo studio album, Planet Oz. The song was written and produced by Trevor Horn. It reached number 93 in the UK Singles Chart.

== Background ==
Inga was introduced to Trevor Horn at a studio in London through her producer, Andy Richards, and they soon ran into one another again at other studios. On one occasion, Horn played "Riding into Blue" to Inga on a guitar and she immediately expressed interest in recording it. Horn originally wrote the melody of "Riding into Blue" around 1975, but it was not used at the time.

== Release ==
"Riding into Blue" was released as a single in the UK on 18 June 1990. It was originally scheduled for a UK and European release during May 1990. A release in the United States was also planned through Atlantic Records, but did not come to fruition. In the UK, the song achieved some radio play, but reached no higher than number 93 in the UK charts and remained in the top 100 for three weeks.

== Music video ==
The song's music video was directed by Mike Owen.

== Critical reception ==
Upon its release, pan-European magazine Music & Media wrote, "With a bassline stolen from the Who's 'A Quick One, While He's Away' and layered with synthesizer patterns and spaghetti-western tunes, this is an interesting number." Tim Nicholson of Record Mirror remarked that Inga "trots through an ambling tune that conjures up images of tumbleweed towns and chaps in chaps". He encouraged readers to "look to the 12-inch for the complete wild west story". John Morgan of the Derby Evening Telegraph noted, "The song opens with a nifty, swinging rhythm and Inga's sweet vocal harmony parts adding an air of intrigue to what sounds at first to be a countryish number. But the piece offers much more than that, and develops an almost surreal aura." Iestyn George, writing for the Blackpool Gazette, called it the "latest in a line of ambient dance tracks, calming the nerves while still managing to provoke considerable movement on the dance floor".

== Track listing ==
7–inch single (UK and Europe)

1. "Riding into Blue (Cowboy Song)" – 3:42
2. "I Get Along" – 3:43

12–inch single (UK and Europe)

1. "Riding into Blue (Cowboy Song)" (Kiss My Horse Mix) – 5:15
2. "Riding into Blue (Cowboy Song)" – 3:43
3. "I Get Along" – 3:43

12–inch single (UK and Europe)

1. "Riding into Blue (Cowboy Song)" (Sun Electric Mix) – 8:30
2. "Riding into Blue (Cowboy Song)" (Destry Rides Again) – 7:42
3. "I Get Along" – 3:43

CD single (UK and Europe)

1. "Riding into Blue (Cowboy Song)" – 3:43
2. "Riding into Blue (Cowboy Song)" (Sun Electric Mix) – 4:45
3. "Riding into Blue (Cowboy Song)" (Destry Rides Again) – 7:25
4. "I Get Along" – 3:42

CD single (Europe)

1. "Riding into Blue (Cowboy Song)" (Sun Electric Mix) – 8:34
2. "Riding into Blue (Cowboy Song)" (Destry Rides Again) – 7:25
3. "I Get Along" – 3:45

== Personnel ==
"Riding into Blue (Cowboy Song)"

- Inga Humpe – vocals
- George De Angelis – keyboards, drum programming
- Billy Liesegang – guitars
- Lol Creme – rhythm guitar, 'who's the loner' vocals
- Geoff Dugmore – drum programming
- Pete Glenister – end guitar riff
- Trevor Horn – 'some little inconsequential knick knacks'

Production

- Trevor Horn – production ("Riding into Blue (Cowboy Song)")
- Pete Schwier – engineering and mixing ("Riding into Blue (Cowboy Song)")
- Tim Weidner – additional engineering ("Riding into Blue (Cowboy Song)")
- Steve Fitzmaurice – assistant engineering ("Riding into Blue (Cowboy Song)")
- Richard Edwards – assistant engineering ("Riding into Blue (Cowboy Song)")
- Peter Frith – assistant engineering ("Riding into Blue (Cowboy Song)")
- Danton Supple – assistant engineering ("Riding into Blue (Cowboy Song)")
- Fischerman's Friend – production ("I Get Along"), remixing ("Kiss My Horse Mix", "Sun Electric Mix")
- Thomas Fehlmann – production ("I Get Along"), remixing ("Kiss My Horse Mix", "Sun Electric Mix")

== Charts ==
Chart (1990)	Peak position
UK Singles (OCC)	93
