= Swimming with Sharks (Inga & Anete Humpe album) =

Studio album by Inga & Anete Humpe
- Released: 1987
- Length: 36:34
- Label: WEA; Atlantic (US)
- Producer: Armand Volker

Inga & Anete Humpe chronology
Humpe · Humpe (1985)	Swimming with Sharks (1987)

Swimming with Sharks is the second studio album by German duo Inga & Anete Humpe, released in Europe by WEA in 1987. The album was released outside of Europe, including in the UK, US and Australia, in 1988. For the releases outside of Europe, the duo's name was changed to Swimming with Sharks. The album was released in the UK on 8 August 1988.

== Critical reception ==
Professional ratings
Review scores
Source	Rating
NME	7/10

Upon its release in Europe in 1987, Music & Media praised the album as a worthy follow-up to their "critically acclaimed first release" and added that the new album "should satisfy even the highest expectations". They continued, "The songs are strong, Volker's production is excellent (and reminiscent of Kate Bush's Hounds of Love) and their voices always charming and engaging." In the UK, Paul Mathur of Melody Maker noted the album's "rather lovably gawky simplicity" may hamper its commercial chances, but added "there's much to recommend, particularly when the sisters move away from their sometimes rather rigid structures and let those aquamarine voices out into the open seas". He praised "Careless Love", "No Longer Friends", "Sweet Sadness" and "Holy Johnny" for being "heavy with a certain tattered emotion" and added that they are the tracks which work "most appealingly".

Simon Williams of NME noted that "inter-continental influences are much in evidence" across the album, citing ABBA as one of the biggest, with "No Long Friends" being "a deadringer" for "The Winner Takes It All" and "Duet Alone" being "uncannily similar" to "The Day Before You Came". He praised the "gorgeously impalpable harmonies" and added, "Seductive and sensual, when Swimming with Sharks breathe over the turntable, they make underwater romping the most attractive proposition in the entire known world." Although most of the songs "detail finished/crumbling relationships", Williams felt that the duo could not "sustain such melodrama over a whole album" as heard on the single "Careless Love". He was critical of the "unsympathetic programming", with Volker having "copie[d] every naff synth effect pioneered by ELO ten years ago". Paul Taylor of the Manchester Evening News remarked that with their two singles, "Careless Love" and "No Longer Friends", the sisters "suggested a desire to plug the gap left by ABBA as Euro-wide pop principals and all-round nice guys", particularly as they had chosen to sing in English, which Taylor said is "seemingly the international language of pop". He commented that "there's a good deal more to this album than the cunning hooks and sparkling production of those singles" and praised it for being of "more contrasts and greater adventurousness than you might expect".

In the US, Billboard described Swimming with Sharks as "occasionally enticing synth-pop" and added that the duo "manages to vault the inherent limitations of a spare style with such attractive tunes as 'No Longer Friends' and 'Sweet Sadness,' sung with proper teutonic cool". Bob Thompson of the Canadian paper Terrace Standard stated, "Take some brisk Euro-disco, throw in cooing vocals and lots of lyrical posturing and you have Swimming with Sharks. In the end, [the duo] sounds like the cabaret Bangles with a sultry opinion of themselves."

== Track listing ==
All tracks are written by Inga Humpe & Anete Humpe except "4 Winds" by Humpe, Humpe and Tim Daly.

No.	Title	Length
1.	"Careless Love"	4:04
2.	"Idiot"	3:04
3.	"No Longer Friends"	3:47
4.	"Conspiracy"	3:26
5.	"Sweet Sadness"	3:56
6.	"4 Winds"	3:16
7.	"Don't Spoil My Day"	4:47
8.	"Duet Alone"	3:43
9.	"Holy Johnny"	3:28
10.	"Swimming with Sharks"	3:39

== Personnel ==
- Inga Humpe – vocals
- Anete Humpe – vocals

Additional musicians

- Kristian Schultze – keyboards, programming
- Ingo Ito – guitar
- Peter Weihe – guitar
- Curt Cress – drums

Production

- Armand Volker – production
- Thomas Fehlmann – pre-production, additional programming

Other

- Peter Adamik – photography
- Rotogravures – cover

== Charts ==
Chart (1987)	Peak position
German Albums (Offizielle Top 100)	54
