= Weissglut =

German rock band

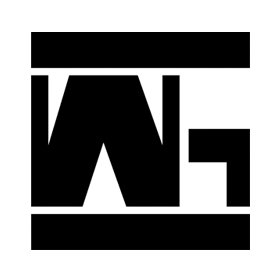
Logo of Weissglut

Weissglut was a German band from Bingen am Rhein that belonged to the Neue Deutsche Härte direction. It was disbanded in 2002 after the third album, existing further on however under the name Silber.

== History ==
Weissglut brought their first album, also named Weissglut, on the market in 1998. Two months later they signed a contract with Sony and republished the album again under the name Etwas kommt in deine Welt (Something comes in your world). The only differences between the new version and the first one were a new song added and a new cover.

In 1999, the rest of the band separated from Josef Maria Klumb, who was accused of entertaining right extremist ideas. The lyrics composition, previously handled entirely by Klumb, was taken over by the new vocalist Tom von K., who could however still use old text fragments for inspiration.

The third album came in 2000, after the splitting of the band. Klumb had kept the name Weissglut reserved, and the old band went on further under the name Silber. Klumb managed to start his own band with new members, but the project was shortlived. Weissglut played a single concert on 14 December 2002 in Munich, before being disbanded by Klumb for personal reasons.

== Discography ==
=== Albums ===
- Weissglut (1998)
- Etwas kommt in deine Welt (1998)
- Zeichen (2000)

=== Singles ===
- "Unschuldsengel" (1998)
- "In mir" (2000)
- "Tanz der Sinne" (2000)

=== Others ===
- Aus der Dunkelheit ins Licht (2001)
- Im Staub der Rebellion (2001)
