= Lucilectric =

German pop/rock band

- Origin: Berlin, Germany
- Genres: Alternative rock, rock/pop
- Years active: 1993–1999
- Labels: BMG/Sing Sing, EMI, EMI Electrola
- Past members: Luci van Org; Ralf Goldkind
- Website: lucilectric.de

Lucilectric was a German pop/rock duo founded in 1993 by Luci van Org and producer Ralf Goldkind. They are known primarily for their 1994 hit single "Mädchen" ("Girl"), which spent 12 weeks in the German Top 10, eventually reaching number two. The single also charted in the Swiss, Austrian and Dutch markets. Hey Süßer (Hey sweetheart), another of single from the same album, also reached the Top 40 in 1994. Lucilectric would go on to record two more albums and eventually separated in 1999.

== History ==
Lucilectric was created in Berlin in 1993 by Luci van Org and Ralf Goldkind, arguably as part of the revival of the German language rock/pop movement in the early 90s, which came on the heels of the Neue Deutsche Welle but well before the Neue Deutsche Härte emerged from the underground. Other similar groups from that same period which attained bigger commercial success through the decade and beyond include Tic Tac Toe and Die Prinzen. Although popular, Lucilectric were criticized at the time by some observers of German culture to be representative of the "trivialization of femininity".

After Lucilectric, Luci van Org would go on to work as a television presenter and host. In 2001 she formed the gothic alternative band Übermutter, while Goldkind continued to produce music, most notably for Nina Hagen and Die Fantastischen Vier

== Discography ==
Year	Album	Chart Positions		
Year	Album	DE	CH	AT
1994	Mädchen: Released: 25 April 1994; Format: CD and audio cassette	14	20	20
1996	Süß und Gemein: Released: 12 August 1996; Formats: CD and audio cassette	-	-	45
1997	Tiefer: Released: 20 October 1997; Formats: CD	-	-	-

=== Singles ===
Year	Single	Chart positions				Album
Year	Single	DE	CH	AT	NL	Album
1994	"Mädchen"	2	5	3	5	Mädchen
1994	"Hey Süßer"	33	28	1	-	Mädchen
1996	"Liebe macht dumm"	89	-	20	-	Süß und Gemein
1996	"Bildung"	92	-	-	-	Süß und Gemein

== Awards ==
- BAMBI (1994)
- ECHO - Single of the Year for "Mädchen" (1995)
