= Fleischmann (band) =

German rock/metal band

Fleischmann was a German band, founded in 1989, that pioneered a style called "Neue Deutsche Härte", being ancestors of successful bands like Rammstein. Their style is considered a "missing link" between metal and NDH.

They released several albums, their most popular one being Hunger, which made its debut in 1995. A single was released from the album titled "Ohne Traurigkeit". They received help on the Hunger album from Farin Urlaub (from Die Ärzte), who assisted in the backing vocals and chorus.

== Discography ==
Studio albums

- Power of Limits (1992)
- Fleischwolf (1993)
- Das Treibhaus (1994)
- Hunger (1995)
