= OK (Farin Urlaub song) =

Single by Farin Urlaub

from the album Endlich Urlaub!
- Released: February 4, 2002
- Genre: Punk rock
- Length: 4:19
- Label: Völker hört die Tonträger
- Songwriter: Farin Urlaub
- Producers: Uwe Hoffmann & Farin Urlaub

Farin Urlaub singles chronology
| "Sumisu" (2001) | "OK" (2002) | "Phänomenal egal" (2002) |

"OK" is a song by Farin Urlaub. It's the third single and sixth track from his debut album Endlich Urlaub!. It's a hate song. It was originally meant for Die Ärzte. It's also one of the heaviest songs on the album.

== Video ==
In the video, Farin visits the morgue and checks out a dead body. Most of the footage is of the band, though, whose members are all Farin, although in two different hair colours and styles than what he usually wears. The video is notable, because at the end of the video Farin smashes many guitars on the ground.

The video on the single is another version.

== Track listing ==
1. "OK" – 4:19
2. "Saudade" ("Longing" [in Portuguese]) – 3:41
3. "Petze" ("Squealer") – 3:30
4. "OK" (Video) – 4:19

== Chart performance ==
| Chart (2002) | Peak position |
|---|---|
| Germany (GfK) | 32 |
