= Careless Love (Inga & Anete Humpe song) =

Single by Inga & Anete Humpe

from the album Swimming with Sharks
- B-side: "Come Closer Now"
- Released: September 1987
- Length: 4:05
- Label: Atlantic
- Songwriter(s): Anete Humpe; Inga Humpe
- Producer(s): Armand Volker

Inga & Anete Humpe singles chronology
"3 of Us" (1986)	"Careless Love" (1987)	"No Longer Friends" (1988)

Music video
- "Careless Love" on YouTube

"Careless Love" is a song by German duo Inga & Anete Humpe, released in 1987 as the lead single from their second studio album, Swimming with Sharks. The song was written by the duo and was produced by Armand Volker.

The single was initially released in Germany and other European territories in September 1987 under the name Inga & Anete Humpe. It peaked at number 24 in the West German charts. The single then received a release in the UK, US and Australia in 1988. As the duo's name was deemed unsuitable for English language countries, it was changed to Swimming with Sharks. The single reached number 63 on the UK Singles Chart.

== Critical reception ==
Upon its release in 1988, pan-European magazine Music & Media praised "Careless Love" as "a dreamy, atmospheric and thoroughly wonderful song" on which the Humpe sisters "prove their undoubted international potential". In the UK, Alan Cackett of the Sheerness Times Guardian stated, "Sisterly German duo with a simple litty ditty cleverly clothed in a full orchestrated arrangement – very classy." Eastbourne Herald called it a "half-decent tune even if the producer has gone to town a bit". The reviewer noted they were "not keen on the spoken part, vich makes ze zinger zound like Helga on 'Allo 'Allo", but concluded it's a "good song [that] ought to have some chart success".

== Track listing ==
7-inch single (Europe, UK, US and Australia)

1. "Careless Love" – 4:05
2. "Come Closer Now" – 3:36

12-inch single (Europe)

1. "Careless Love" (Extended Version) – 6:23
2. "Come Closer Now" – 3:36
3. "Careless Love" (Radio Version) – 4:05

12-inch single (UK and Australia)

1. "Careless Love" (Extended Version) – 6:23
2. "Careless Love" – 4:05
3. "Come Closer Now" – 3:36

CD single (UK)

1. "Careless Love" – 4:03
2. "Conspiracy" – 3:22
3. "Careless Love" (Extended Version) – 6:24
4. "Come Closer Now" – 3:36

== Personnel ==
- Inga Humpe – vocals, arrangement
- Anete Humpe – vocals, arrangement

Production

- Armand Volker – production, arrangement

Other

- Peter Adamik – photography
- Rotogravures – lettering

== Charts ==
Chart (1987–1988)	Peak position
UK Singles (OCC)	63
West Germany (GfK)	24
