= Null Positiv =

German metal band

- Born: Lübbenau, Germany
- Genres: Neue Deutsche Härte, alternative metal, nu metal
- Years active: 2015–present
- Members: Elli Berlin, Bene Gugerbauer, Manu Aldor, Flo Schnablo
- Past members: Martin Kotte, Tom Fecher
- Website: nullpositiv.com

Null Positiv is a German metal band that was founded in Lübbenau in 2015. The band uses elements of nu metal and the Neue Deutsche Härte. Null Positiv itself names bands like Korn, Slipknot, In This Moment and System of a Down as their musical influence, along with other metal bands like Rammstein. The name of the band translates to "zero positive", in reference to the O+ blood type.

== History ==
The producer Oliver Pinelli is behind the first EP Krieger., released in 2016, and the first two albums Koma (2017) and Amok (2018). The band also founded their own label Triplebase.

Null Positiv played with the album Koma as a support act for Anthrax, The Raven Age and Life of Agony and had a gig at the Wacken Open Air Festival in 2017.

The guitarist Martin Kotte left Null Positiv in 2018 for personal reasons. His successor Bene Gugerbauer had a significant influence on the musical style of the band. Due to a back injury of singer Elli Berlin in early 2019, the band had to take a forced break. From May 2019 on, they toured together as co-headliners with Ankor through Switzerland, France, Belgium and Italy and won the newcomer competition at the M'era Luna Festival 2019.

In 2020 they released their third studio album "Independenz", which the band produced completely by themselves.

== Discography ==
- 2016: Krieger (EP, CD, Triplebase Records)
- 2017: Unvergessen (Single, MP3, Triplebase Records)
- 2017: Koma (Album, CD, Triplebase Records)
- 2017: Live at Wacken Open Air (Live album, DVD-V, Triplebase Records)
- 2018: Amok (Album, CD, Triplebase Records)
- 2020: Independenz (Album, CD, Triplebase Records)

== Music videos ==
- 2016: Friss dich auf (directed by Daniel Flax)
- 2016: Kollaps (directed by Daniel Flax)
- 2016: Zukunft ungewiss (directed by Daniel Flax)
- 2017: Unvergessen (directed by Daniel Flax)
- 2017: Koma (directed by Daniel Flax)
- 2017: Wo Rauch ist, ist auch Feuer (directed by Daniel Flax)
- 2017: Hass (directed by Michael Roob)
- 2017: Hoffnung ist ein suesses Gift (directed by Michael Roob)
- 2018: Amok (directed by Michael Roob)
- 2018: Trauma (directed by Michael Roob)
- 2019: Turm der Angst (directed by Michael Roob)
- 2020: Freiheit (directed by Michael Roob)
- 2020: Independenz (directed by Michael Roob)
- 2020: Kommen und Gehen (directed by Michael Roob)
