= Dusche =

Single by Farin Urlaub

from the album Am Ende der Sonne
- Released: 7 May 2005
- Genre: Punk rock
- Length: 4:12
- Label: Völker hört die Tonträger
- Songwriter: Farin Urlaub
- Producer: Farin Urlaub

Farin Urlaub singles chronology
"Phänomenal egal" (2002)	"Dusche" (2005)	"Porzellan" (2005)

Dusche (German: Shower) is a song by Farin Urlaub. It's the first single and fourteenth (and the last) track from his album Am Ende der Sonne. It's about a paranoid man, who fears things in his house, thinking that they are conspiring to assassinate him. The man fights back and decides to burn everything down, when nothing else helps. The shower is the only one on his side. The man gradually grows more frenetic, until the end, where he is stabbed by his only friend.

== Video ==
Farin plays a hitman, hired to kill or rather destroy the things also mentioned in the song. The video, however, shows betrayal – the shower kills the protagonist with a blade in the end.

== Track listing ==
1. "Dusche" ("Shower") – 4:12
2. "Alle Fragen dieser Welt" ("All questions of this world") – 1:51
3. "Klasse" ("Classy") – 3:12
4. "Dusche" (Video) – 4:12

== Chart performance ==
Chart (2005)	Peak position
Austria (Ö3 Austria Top 40)	28
Germany (GfK)	13
Switzerland (Schweizer Hitparade)	53
