= Die Wahrheit übers Lügen =

Studio album by Farin Urlaub Racing Team
- Released: 31 October 2008
- Genre: Büffelherde: Punk rock Rock; Ska punk Ponyhof: Reggae; Ska; Dancehall
- Length: Großes Album: 36:27; Kleines Album: 13:58; Total: 50:29
- Label: Völker hört die Tonträger/Universal Records
- Producer: Mirko Schaffer, Farin Urlaub

Farin Urlaub Racing Team chronology
Livealbum of Death (2006)	Die Wahrheit übers Lügen (2008)	Faszination Weltraum (2014)

Die Wahrheit übers Lügen (The truth about lying) is the second album by Farin Urlaub Racing Team and the fourth album by Farin Urlaub.

As FURT was initially Farin Urlaub's live band, it was previously used on the live album Livealbum of Death. This is the first studio album (being the third overall) in which Farin Urlaub incorporates his Racing Team.

The album was released with a short bonus album, "Ponyhof", just as Jazz ist anders was. "Büffelherde", the main album, consists of rock songs and on "Ponyhof", Farin experiments with reggae and ska songs. The main album, however, is quite short, with only 11 songs, which is rather unusual for Die Ärzte's and its members' solo albums since 1993.

== Track listing ==
All songs written by Farin Urlaub.

Großes Album (Büffelherde) (Big album (Buffalo herd))

1. "Nichimgriff" (Notundercontrol) – 2:46
2. "Unscharf" (Fuzzy, lit. Unsharp) – 2:55
3. "Gobi Todič" – 2:32
4. "Seltsam" (Odd) – 2:51
5. "Krieg" (War) – 3:15
6. "Pakistan" – 2:50
7. "Niemals" (Never) – 3:31
8. "Die Leiche" (The corpse) – 3:45
9. "Monster" – 3:28
10. "Atem" (Breath) – 4:09
11. "Karten" (Cards) – 4:21

Kleines Album (Ponyhof) (Small album (Pony ranch))

1. "I.F.D.G." (short for "Ich find' das gut" (I like that, lit. I find that good)) – 4:06
2. "Zu heiß" (Too hot) – 4:03
3. "Insel" (Island) – 3:29
4. "Trotzdem" (Nevertheless) – 2:18

== Singles ==
2008: "Nichimgriff"
2009: "Niemals"
2009: "Krieg"
2010: "Zu Heiß"

== Chart performance ==
Chart (2008)	Peak position
Austrian Albums (Ö3 Austria)	5
German Albums (Offizielle Top 100)	2
Swiss Albums (Schweizer Hitparade)	12

== Certifications ==
In 2009, Die Wahrheit übers Lügen was certified gold in Germany.
