= Phänomenal egal =

Single by Farin Urlaub

from the album Endlich Urlaub!
- Released: 6 May 2002
- Genre: Rock
- Length: 3:13
- Label: Völker hört die Tonträger
- Songwriter: Farin Urlaub
- Producers: Uwe Hoffmann & Farin Urlaub

Farin Urlaub singles chronology
"OK" (2002)	"Phänomenal egal" (2002)	"Dusche" (2005)

"Phänomenal egal" [Phenomenally indifferent] is a song by Farin Urlaub. It's the fourth single and fourteenth track from his debut album Endlich Urlaub!. It's a love song, sung sarcastically as the narrator sings things like "Zwar gibt es keine schönere Frau auf der ganzen Welt für mich/Doch in Wirklichkeit lieb' ich dich nicht" (There's no prettier woman for me/But really I don't love you) and "Ich stehe zwar ab und zu einfach nur so vor deiner Tür/Doch im Prinzip will ich gar nichts von dir" (I stand time to time in front of your door/But really I don't want anything from you).

== Video ==
A crowd of girls start running in a street and Farin stands on another street, so the girls seem to be groupies running towards Farin. On the way they cause some destruction but when they get to Farin, they run him down and onward.

== Track listing ==
1. "Phänomenal egal" ("Phenomenally indifferent") – 3:13
2. "Pudelsong" ("Poodle song") – 2:22
3. "Jeden Tag kuscheln" ("Every day cuddling") – 3:23 (a piano version of "Jeden Tag Sonntag" from Endlich Urlaub!)

== Charts ==
Chart (2002)	Peak position
Germany (GfK)	44
