= Mädchen (album) =

Studio album by Lucilectric
- Released: April 25, 1994
- Recorded: 1993–94 in Berlin
- Genre: Pop/rock
- Label: BMG / Sing Sing
- Producers: Luci van Org, Ralf Goldkind

Lucilectric chronology
Mädchen (1994)	Süß und Gemein (1996)

Mädchen (German for girl) was the first studio album of the German rock/pop duo Lucilectric. The album spawned a namesake single that spent 12 weeks in the German Top 10, eventually reaching number two. Another single, Hey Süßer (hey sweetheart), reached number one in the Austrian charts. The album and both singles also charted in the Swiss and Dutch markets.

== Track listing ==
No.	Title	Length
1.	"Mädchen"	3:16
2.	"Warum?"	4:08
3.	"Explosiv"	2:57
4.	"Hey Süßer"	3:44
5.	"Dreckig"	2:58
6.	"Umlaufbahn"	3:30
7.	"Hey Fisch"	3:47
8.	"Herzlichen Dank"	3:47
9.	"Nur wer im Heute lebt"	3:53
10.	"Schande"	3:28
11.	"Schlaflied"	3:43

All tracks written by van Org and Goldkind

== Charts ==
"Mädchen" (1994)
Sample from the single Mädchen

Year	Album	Chart Positions		
Year	Album	DE	CH	AT
1994	Mädchen: Format: CD and audio cassette	14	20	20

=== Singles ===
Year	Single	Chart positions			
Year	Single	DE	CH	AT	NL
1994	"Mädchen"	2	5	3	5
1994	"Hey Süßer"	33	28	1	-
1994	"Warum?"	-	-	-	-

== Awards ==
- ECHO - Single of the Year for Mädchen (1995)

== Info ==
A rare English version of the song, called "Girly Girl," was used in the film The NeverEnding Story III.
