= Mädchen (song) =

1993 single by Lucilectric

Single by Lucilectric

from the album Mädchen
- Language: German
- English title: "Girl"
- B-side: "Nur wer im heute lebt"
- Released: 1993
- Studio: Boogie Park (Hamburg, Germany)
- Genre: Pop; novelty
- Length: 3:16
- Label: Sing Sing; BMG Ariola
- Songwriters: Luci van Org; Goldkind
- Producers: Annette Humpe; Andreas Herbig

Lucilectric singles chronology
"Mädchen" (1993)	"Hey Süßer" (1994)

Music video
- "Mädchen" on YouTube

"Mädchen" (pronounced [ˈmɛːtçən], English: "Girl") is a German-language song by German pop rock musical duo Lucilectric, written by members Luci van Org and Goldkind. The track was produced by Annette Humpe and Andreas Herbig and was released as a single in Germany in mid-1993. Although it was not successful initially, the song eventually became a top-10 hit in the Netherlands, after which it charted in several other European countries, reaching number two in Germany and becoming a top-five hit in Austria and Switzerland. The song is certified gold in both Austria and Germany and won an Echo Award for Best National Single in 1995.

== Release and promotion ==
"Mädchen" was originally released in Germany in mid-1993 but did not experience commercial success. The song eventually gained attention in the Netherlands, where it was released in January 1994, at which point radio stations increased the track's airplay. To promote the single, Lucilectric performed the song on several television programmes, including the German game show Geld oder Liebe. The duo also made a music video that received rotation on German television channel Viva TV, then a new network, which bolstered both the commercial success of the song and Lucilectric's profile in Germany. On 25 April 1994, "Mädchen" was released as the opening track on the Mädchen album.

== Critical reception ==
Music & Media magazine reviewed "Mädchen" on 12 March 1994, writing that the song combines "Nina Hagen weirdelica with Lene Lovich hysteria", calling the track "Unbeschreiblich weiblich [Indescribably feminine]". Raúl Cairo of the same publication called the track "catchy but weird". Daniel Dekker of Dutch television organisation TROS noted its catchy chorus as well as its entertainment factor. In 1995, "Mädchen" received an Echo Award for Best National Single.

== Commercial performance ==
"Mädchen" became a top-10 hit on both the Dutch Top 40 and Single Top 100 charts in the Netherlands. On the latter chart, the song debuted at number 25 in March 1994 from plentiful radio airplay. Afterwards, the song rose up the chart, peaking at number five four weeks later. On the Dutch Top 40, the song entered at number 31 and climbed to number seven on 9 April 1994, four weeks after its debut. The song spent nine weeks on both rankings, finishing at number 72 on the Dutch Top 40 year-end listing and at number 90 on the Single Top 100's annual compilation. In neighbouring Belgium, the song debuted at number 38 on the Ultratop chart on 23 April 1994, marking its only appearance in the Belgian top 50.

"Mädchen" debuted at number 44 on the German Singles Chart in March 1994. After nine weeks, it ascended to its peak of number two, where it stayed for two weeks in late May. The single remained in the top 100 for 23 weeks and was Germany's 14th-most-successful single of 1994, earning a gold sales certification from the Bundesverband Musikindustrie (BVMI) for shipping over 250,000 copies. The song then charted in Austria, where it lingered on the Ö3 Austria Top 40 ranking for 13 weeks and was certified gold for sales exceeding 25,000 units, ending 1994 at number 27 on Austria's year-end chart. In Switzerland, "Mädchen" peaked at number five for three weeks and spent 18 weeks within the top 50, coming it at number 33 on the Swiss year-end ranking. Overall, "Mädchen" was Europe's 68th-best-selling single of 1994, peaking at number 12 on the Eurochart Hot 100 in June 1994.

== Track listings ==
German maxi-CD single

1. "Mädchen" (radio mix) – 3:16
2. "Mädchen" (extended mix) – 4:18
3. "Mädchen" (X mix) – 5:31
4. "Nur wer im heute lebt" – 3:53

German 7-inch single

A. "Mädchen" (Mädchen radio mix) – 3:16
B. "Nur wer im heute lebt" – 3:53

European 12-inch single

A1. "Mädchen" (X mix) – 5:31
A2. "Mädchen" (radio mix) – 3:16
B1. "Mädchen" (extended mix) – 4:18
B2. "Nur wer im heute lebt" – 3:53

== Credits and personnel ==
Credits are taken from the German maxi-CD single liner notes and the Mädchen album booklet.

Studio

- Produced and recorded at Boogie Park Studio (Hamburg, Germany)

Personnel

- Luci van Org – music and lyrics, vocals
- Ralf Goldkind – music and lyrics (as Goldkind), guitar, keyboards, trombone
- Andreas Herbig – programming, production, mixing, editing, engineering
- Axel Wernecke – programming, engineering
- Annette Humpe – production
- Kay Fricke – cover artwork
- Kess – photography

== Charts ==
=== Weekly charts ===
Chart (1994)	Peak position
Austria (Ö3 Austria Top 40)	3
Belgium (Ultratop 50 Flanders)	38
Europe (Eurochart Hot 100)	12
Germany (GfK)	2
Netherlands (Dutch Top 40)	7
Netherlands (Single Top 100)	5
Switzerland (Schweizer Hitparade)	5

=== Year-end charts ===
Chart (1994)	Position
Austria (Ö3 Austria Top 40)	27
Europe (Eurochart Hot 100)	68
Germany (Media Control)	14
Netherlands (Dutch Top 40)	72
Netherlands (Single Top 100)	90
Switzerland (Schweizer Hitparade)	33

== Certifications ==
Region	Certification	Certified units/sales
Austria (IFPI Austria)	Gold	25,000^{*}
Germany (BVMI)	Gold	250,000^{^}
^{*} Sales figures based on certification alone.^{^} Shipments figures based on certification alone.
