= Endlich Urlaub! =

Studio album by Farin Urlaub
- Released: 22 October 2001
- Recorded: Sonnenstudio, Casa Pepe Studio
- Genre: Punk rock Rock; Ska-punk
- Length: 49:41
- Label: Völker hört die Tonträger
- Producer: Farin Urlaub

Farin Urlaub chronology
Endlich Urlaub! (2001)	Am Ende der Sonne (2005)

Original cover

Endlich Urlaub! is the first solo album from the German musician Farin Urlaub (guitarist of Die Ärzte), released in 2001. It features the typical humour and overall music style fans of Die Ärzte are used to but is more diverse and experimental. The title translates to Vacation at last, or, seeing as this was his first solo effort, Urlaub at last.

The album originally had a cover featuring Farin walking away from a building that he had implicitly set on fire. The idea was dropped following the September 11 attacks.

== Track listing ==
All songs written by Farin Urlaub.

1. "Intro (manche nennen es Musik)" (Intro (some call it music)) - 1:02
2. "Jeden Tag Sonntag" (Every day Sunday) - 2:09
3. "Sumisu" (Japanese for Smith – a tribute to The Smiths) - 2:13
4. "Glücklich" (Happy) - 2:56
5. "Ich gehöre nicht dazu" (I don't belong to them) - 3:15
6. "OK" - 4:19
7. "Der Kavalier" (The gentleman) - 3:27
8. "Am Strand" (On the beach) - 2:45
9. "Wunderbar" (Wonderful) - 2:39
10. "Das schöne Mädchen" (The beautiful girl) - 4:37
11. "1000 Jahre schlechten Sex" (1000 years of bad sex) - 3:30
12. "...und die Gitarre war noch warm" (...and the guitar was still warm) - 3:39
13. "Lieber Staat" (Dear state) - 3:53
14. "Phänomenal egal" (Phenomenally indifferent) - 3:13
15. "Abschiedslied" (Farewell song) - 3:26
16. "Outro (ja, das wurde auch Zeit)" (Outro (yeah, it was about time)) - 2:22

== Singles ==
2001: Glücklich
2001: Sumisu
2002: OK
2002: Phänomenal egal

== Personnel ==
- Farin Urlaub - guitar, vocals, bass, drums
- Peter Quintern - saxophone
- Robert Göhring - sackbut
- Hans-Jörg Fischer - saxophone
- Hardy Appich - trumpet

== Charts ==
=== Weekly charts ===
Chart (2001)	Peak position
Austrian Albums (Ö3 Austria)	28
German Albums (Offizielle Top 100)	3
Swiss Albums (Schweizer Hitparade)	85

=== Year-end charts ===
Chart (2002)	Position
German Albums (Offizielle Top 100)	98
