= Annette Humpe =

German singer

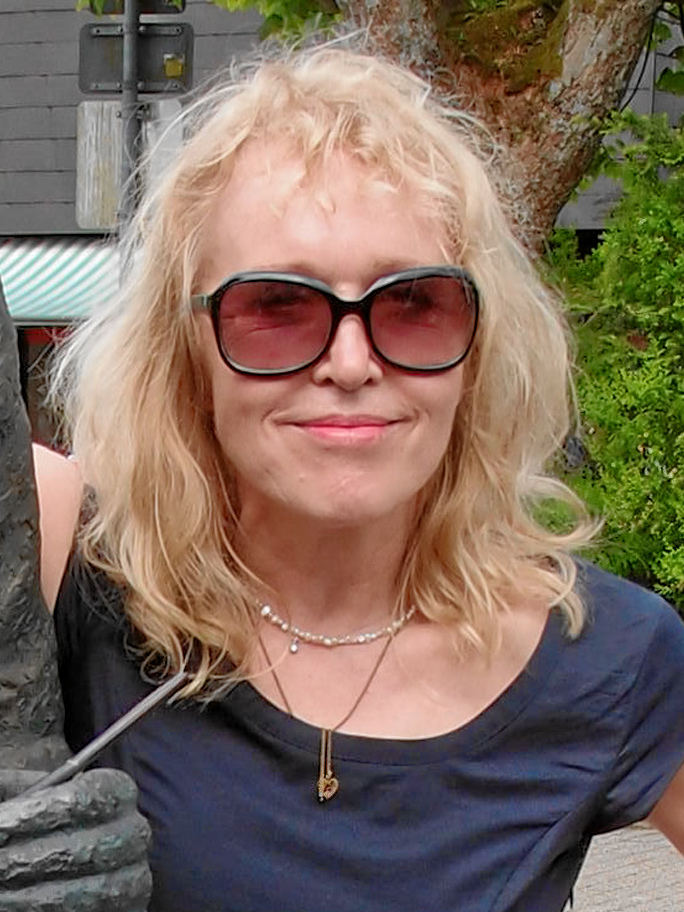
- Humpe in 2011

Background information
- Born: 28 October 1950 (age 76); Hagen, West Germany
- Genres: Pop; rock; NDW
- Occupations: Singer; songwriter; record producer
- Instruments: Vocals; keyboards
- Years active: 1979–present
- Label: Universal
- Website: ich-und-ich.de

Annette Humpe (born 28 October 1950) is a German singer, songwriter, and record producer. Her band Ideal was one of the most important and seminal representatives of the Neue Deutsche Welle. In 2004, she returned as a singer with the project Ich + Ich after a longer break.

== Early life ==
Humpe spent her childhood in Herdecke and Bad Pyrmont, where she graduated from high school in 1971. Following six semesters of studying composition and piano in Cologne, she moved to Berlin in 1974, where she started performing in various bands. Her younger sister Inga Humpe is a musician as well and they have worked on various joint projects.

== Career ==
Humpe achieved first commercial successes in 1979 with the band Neonbabies, which was founded by her and her sister Inga. They disbanded in 1983. Already in 1980, Humpe founded Ideal along with Ernst Ulrich Deuker and Frank Jürgen Krüger (called "EffJott"). Among others, they also recorded songs originally performed by Neonbabies including the highly popular "Blaue Augen", written by Annette Humpe. The song remains Ideal's highest-charting song and it was also covered by various artists like Die Prinzen, Blümchen, Yvonne Catterfeld, Selig and Gunter Gabriel. In the band, Humpe served as a songwriter and she performed lead vocals and keyboards. Ideal succeeded as part of the Neue Deutsche Welle being among the best-known representatives of the movement. The Ideal members were also close friends of the band Trio, for whom Annette Humpe occasionally performed as a backing vocalist, most notably on the number one single "Da Da Da".

Ideal broke up in 1983 and Humpe first appeared as a record producer. For the group DÖF she co-wrote and produced the commercially successful title "Codo", which was a number one hit in Germany, Austria and the Netherlands and also reached number four in the Swiss single charts. The song was performed by the two Austrian comedians Joesi Prokopetz and Manfred Tauchen along with Inga Humpe. In 1984 she was the producer of the band Palais Schaumburg.

The sisters Annette and Inga Humpe founded the duo Humpe & Humpe in 1985. They wrote and produced most of the songs released on their two studio albums released until 1987. The single "Careless Love" reached the German single charts and peaked at number 24. While the duo was widely known as Humpe & Humpe, the names appeared on the albums as Inga & Anete Humpe and Humpe – Humpe respectively. The duo was known as Swimming with Sharks in the UK, probably due to the potential sexual connotations of the name Humpe in English.

During this time Humpe also produced other artists including Rio Reiser and Heiner Pudelko. In 1990, she released her first solo studio album called Solo. The album did not chart but it was re-issued on CD in 2005 after Humpe's success with Ich + Ich.

Annette Humpe resigns as a singer after the release of her album and would exclusively work as a composer and producer over the following years. During that time, she wrote and produced for successful artists such as Udo Lindenberg, Die Prinzen, Lucilectric, Sin With Sebastian, Nena, Band ohne Namen and Etwas. She produced the first four albums of Die Prinzen and all records were major hits on the charts in the German-speaking countries. The song "Mädchen", which she co-produced, was a top ten hit in Germany, Austria, Switzerland and the Netherlands for Lucilectric. In 1995, she released the album Sugar walls under the pseudonym Bamby. It was another collaboration with her sister Inga. From 1997 to 2002, Humpe entirely retired from the music business for personal reasons. Still, in 1998 the song "Gel song", which was co-written and produced by her, entered the German national final for the Eurovision Song Contest 1998. Performed by Fokker, the comedy song placed fourth in a field on 12 participants.

With singer Adel Tawil, Humpe founded the duo Ich + Ich in 2004. She writes or co-writes and co-produces all of the songs. She performs backing vocals and lead vocals on some tracks but Adel Tawil is the main vocalist of the duo. Due to heavy stage fright, Annette Humpe no longer performs live so that Adel Tawil performs all concerts on his own along with the band. The duo has released three studio albums and one live album so far. Their second album Vom selben Stern has sold more than 1,125,000 copies and was certified six times platinum in Germany making it one of the most successful German albums in recent history. The album also spawned five singles of which three were certified platinum. Their third studio album was released in 2009 and it went straight to number one in Germany keeping the top position for five consecutive weeks. Previously, the lead single "Pflaster" had reached the top position in the single charts making it the band's first number one hit.

In 2011, Humpe teamed up with German singer Max Raabe and co-wrote his album, Küssen kann man nicht alleine; a second collaboration, Für Frauen ist das kein Problem, followed in 2013.

== Personal life ==
Humpe gave birth to a son in 1992.

== Discography ==
=== Albums ===
- Humpe • Humpe (1985) (with her sister Inga)
- Swimming with Sharks (1987) (as Inga & Anete Humpe)
- Solo (1990)
- Zeitgeschichte – Das Beste von und für Annette Humpe (2010)

=== Singles ===
- "Ich laß' mich geh'n" (1990)
- "Ich küsse Ihren Mann" (1990)
