= List of number-one hits of 2000 (Austria) =

This is a list of the Austrian Singles Chart number-one hits of 2000.

Issue date	Song	Artist
2 January	"Maschen-Draht-Zaun"	Stefan Raab
9 January	"Maschen-Draht-Zaun"	Stefan Raab
16 January	"Maschen-Draht-Zaun"	Stefan Raab
23 January	"Maschen-Draht-Zaun"	Stefan Raab
30 January	"Move Your Body"	Eiffel 65
6 February	"Move Your Body"	Eiffel 65
13 February	"Move Your Body"	Eiffel 65
20 February	"Anton aus Tirol"	Anton featuring DJ Ötzi
27 February	"Anton aus Tirol"	Anton featuring DJ Ötzi
5 March	"Anton aus Tirol"	Anton featuring DJ Ötzi
12 March	"My Heart Goes Boom (La Di Da Da)"	French Affair
19 March	"Anton aus Tirol"	Anton featuring DJ Ötzi
26 March	"Anton aus Tirol"	Anton featuring DJ Ötzi
2 April	"Anton aus Tirol"	Anton featuring DJ Ötzi
9 April	"Anton aus Tirol"	Anton featuring DJ Ötzi
16 April	"Anton aus Tirol"	Anton featuring DJ Ötzi
23 April	"Anton aus Tirol"	Anton featuring DJ Ötzi
30 April	"Anton aus Tirol"	Anton featuring DJ Ötzi
7 May	"Ich vermiss' dich... (wie die Hölle)"	Zlatko
14 May	"Ich vermiss' dich... (wie die Hölle)"	Zlatko
21 May	"Ich vermiss' dich... (wie die Hölle)"	Zlatko
28 May	"Ich vermiss' dich... (wie die Hölle)"	Zlatko
4 June	"It's My Life"	Bon Jovi
11 June	"It's My Life"	Bon Jovi
18 June	"Freestyler"	Bomfunk MCs
25 June	"Freestyler"	Bomfunk MCs
2 July	"Freestyler"	Bomfunk MCs
9 July	"Freestyler"	Bomfunk MCs
16 July	"Freestyler"	Bomfunk MCs
23 July	"Freestyler"	Bomfunk MCs
30 July	"Around the World (La La La La La)"	ATC
6 August	"Around the World (La La La La La)"	ATC
13 August	"Around the World (La La La La La)"	ATC
20 August	"Around the World (La La La La La)"	ATC
27 August	"Around the World (La La La La La)"	ATC
3 September	"Lucky"	Britney Spears
10 September	"Lucky"	Britney Spears
17 September	"Lucky"	Britney Spears
24 September	"Lucky"	Britney Spears
1 October	"I Turn to You"	Melanie C
8 October	"The Spirit of the Hawk"	Rednex
15 October	"The Spirit of the Hawk"	Rednex
22 October	"The Spirit of the Hawk"	Rednex
29 October	"The Spirit of the Hawk"	Rednex
5 November	"The Spirit of the Hawk"	Rednex
12 November	"The Spirit of the Hawk"	Rednex
19 November	"La Passion"	Gigi D'Agostino
26 November	"La Passion"	Gigi D'Agostino
3 December	"La Passion"	Gigi D'Agostino
10 December	"La Passion"	Gigi D'Agostino
17 December	"La Passion"	Gigi D'Agostino
24 December	"La Passion"	Gigi D'Agostino
31 December	"La Passion"	Gigi D'Agostino

== See also ==
- 2000 in music
