= List of number-one hits of 2000 (Germany) =

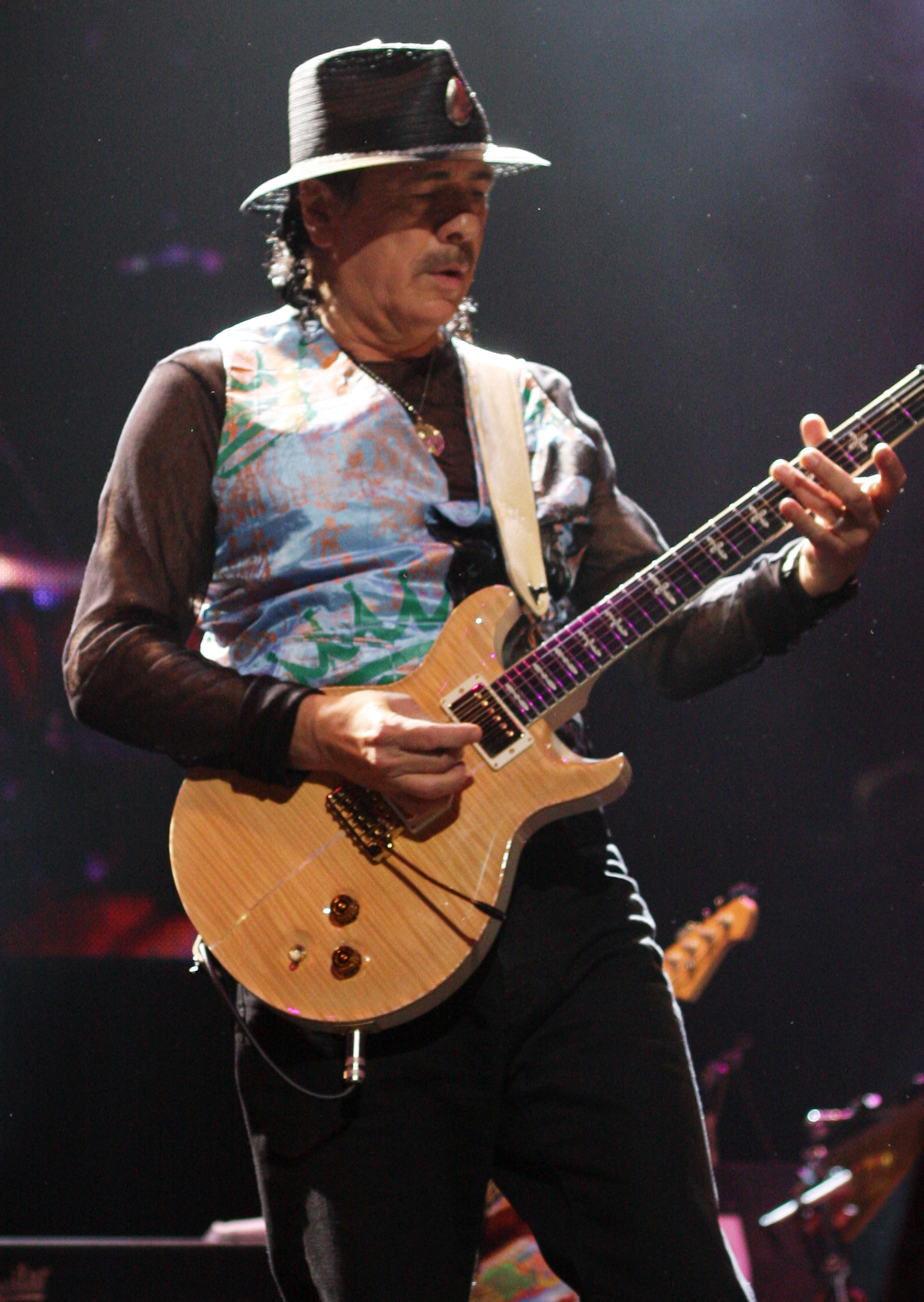
DJ Ötzi's "Anton aus Tirol" became the best-performing single of 2000, while Santana's (pictured Carlos Santana) "Supernatural" became the best-performing album of the year.

This is a list of the German Media Control Top100 Singles Chart number-ones of 2000.

== Number-one hits by week ==
Key
†	Indicates best-performing single and album of 2000

Issue date	Song	Artist	Ref.	Album	Artist	Ref.
3 January	No release (Note: Same issue as for 27 December 1999.)					
10 January	"Maschen-Draht-Zaun"	Stefan Raab		All the Way... A Decade of Song	Celine Dion	
17 January	"Maschen-Draht-Zaun"	Stefan Raab		All the Way... A Decade of Song	Celine Dion	
24 January	"Join Me"	HIM		All the Way... A Decade of Song	Celine Dion	
31 January	"Join Me"	HIM		Supernatural †	Santana	
7 February	"Join Me"	HIM		Razorblade Romance	HIM	
14 February	"Join Me"	HIM		Supernatural †	Santana	
21 February	"My Heart Goes Boom (La Di Da Da)"	French Affair		Supernatural †	Santana	
28 February	"My Heart Goes Boom (La Di Da Da)"	French Affair		Supernatural †	Santana	
6 March	"My Heart Goes Boom (La Di Da Da)"	French Affair		Supernatural †	Santana	
13 March	"American Pie"	Madonna		Stiff Upper Lip	AC/DC	
20 March	"Maria Maria"	Santana featuring The Product G&B		Supernatural †	Santana	
27 March	"Maria Maria"	Santana featuring The Product G&B		Supernatural †	Santana	
3 April	"Maria Maria"	Santana featuring The Product G&B		Ein böses Märchen	Böhse Onkelz	
10 April	"Maria Maria"	Santana featuring The Product G&B		Supernatural †	Santana	
17 April	"Anton aus Tirol" †	Anton featuring DJ Ötzi		Supernatural †	Santana	
24 April	"Leb!"	Die 3. Generation		Supernatural †	Santana	
1 May	"Leb!"	Die 3. Generation		Minor Earth Major Sky	A-ha	
8 May	"Ich Vermiss Dich (Wie die Hölle)"	Zlatko		Minor Earth Major Sky	A-ha	
15 May	"Ich Vermiss Dich (Wie die Hölle)"	Zlatko		Don't Give Me Names	Guano Apes	
22 May	"Ich Vermiss Dich (Wie die Hölle)"	Zlatko		Don't Give Me Names	Guano Apes	
29 May	"Ich Vermiss Dich (Wie die Hölle)"	Zlatko		Oops!... I Did It Again	Britney Spears	
5 June	"Freestyler"	Bomfunk MC's		Oops!... I Did It Again	Britney Spears	
12 June	"Freestyler"	Bomfunk MC's		Crush	Bon Jovi	
19 June	"Freestyler"	Bomfunk MC's		Crush	Bon Jovi	
26 June	"Großer Bruder"	Zlatko and Jürgen		Crush	Bon Jovi	
3 July	"Großer Bruder"	Zlatko and Jürgen		Konkret	Wolfgang Petry	
10 July	"Großer Bruder"	Zlatko and Jürgen		Crush	Bon Jovi	
17 July	"Großer Bruder"	Zlatko and Jürgen		Crush	Bon Jovi	
24 July	"Around the World (La La La La La)"	ATC		Crush	Bon Jovi	
31 July	"Around the World (La La La La La)"	ATC		In Blue	The Corrs	
7 August	"Around the World (La La La La La)"	ATC		In Blue	The Corrs	
14 August	"Around the World (La La La La La)"	ATC		In Blue	The Corrs	
21 August	"Around the World (La La La La La)"	ATC		In Blue	The Corrs	
28 August	"Around the World (La La La La La)"	ATC		In Blue	The Corrs	
4 September	"Lucky"	Britney Spears		In Blue	The Corrs	
11 September	"Lucky"	Britney Spears		Sing When You're Winning	Robbie Williams	
18 September	"Lucky"	Britney Spears		Kassengift	Rosenstolz	
25 September	"The Spirit of the Hawk"	Rednex		Mittendrin	Pur	
2 October	"The Spirit of the Hawk"	Rednex		Music	Madonna	
9 October	"The Spirit of the Hawk"	Rednex		Music	Madonna	
16 October	"The Spirit of the Hawk"	Rednex		Music	Madonna	
23 October	"The Spirit of the Hawk"	Rednex		Sailing to Philadelphia	Mark Knopfler	
30 October	"The Spirit of the Hawk"	Rednex		Chocolate Starfish and the Hot Dog Flavored Water	Limp Bizkit	
6 November	"The Spirit of the Hawk"	Rednex		Runter mit den Spendierhosen, Unsichtbarer!	Die Ärzte	
13 November	"The Spirit of the Hawk"	Rednex		All That You Can't Leave Behind	U2	
20 November	"The Spirit of the Hawk"	Rednex		All That You Can't Leave Behind	U2	
27 November	"Es ist geil ein Arschloch zu sein"	Christian		1	The Beatles	
4 December	"Es ist geil ein Arschloch zu sein"	Christian		Black & Blue	Backstreet Boys	
11 December	"Es ist geil ein Arschloch zu sein"	Christian		1	The Beatles	
18 December	"Es ist geil ein Arschloch zu sein"	Christian		1	The Beatles	
25 December	"Es ist geil ein Arschloch zu sein"	Christian		1	The Beatles	

== See also ==
- List of number-one hits (Germany)
