= Never Stop the Alpenpop =

Compilation album by DJ Ötzi
- Released: 27 August 2001
- Genre: Rave-rock
- Length: 44:38
- Label: EMI
- Producer: Christian Seitz; Claus Marcus; Klaus Biedermann; Mark Duran

DJ Ötzi chronology
Love, Peace & Vollgas (2001)	Never Stop the Alpenpop (2001)	Today Is the Day (2002)

Never Stop the Alpenpop (released as Never Stop... in Australia) is the first compilation album by Austrian singer DJ Ötzi, released on 27 August 2001 in Europe by EMI, and in 2002 in Australia by Shock Records. It compiles tracks originally released on Ötzi's first two albums released in German-speaking Europe, Das Album (2000, with Anton) and Love, Peace & Vollgas (2001), including the international hits "Hey Baby (Uhh, Ahh)" and "Do Wah Diddy". The Australian version of the album marks the first appearance of Ötzi's collaboration with Dutch group Hermes House Band, "Live Is Life (Here We Go)", which was included elsewhere in the world on Ötzi's 2002 album Today Is the Day.

== Cover art ==
The cover of Never Stop the Alpenpop resembles that of Love, Peace & Vollgas, with the same fonts for Ötzi's name and album title, except with a different picture of Ötzi inside of the frame. Never Stop... contains no pictures of Ötzi in its artwork, instead replacing him on the cover with his cartoon avatar from the animated version of the "Hey Baby" music video.

== Critical reception ==
Reviewing the album for NME, Tony Naylor described it as a "staggeringly bad collection of rave-rock beer-hall anthems" and while Ötzi's "tunes are terrace chants, simple, stupid catalysts to communal bonding, odes to lager, life and having a laugh", Naylor felt "in Blair's Britain, we need plenty of all three", calling Ötzi "perfect in his role" as "universal karaoke bloke". Naylor concluded by saying Ötzi's music isn't "low-life, it's just people having a good time".

== Track listing ==
Never Stop the Alpenpop track listing
No.	Title	Length
1.	"Do Wah Diddy" (Party Mix)	3:39
2.	"Hey Baby (Zwei, drei, vier...)"	3:37
3.	"Cheerio (Tiroler Are True)"	3:48
4.	"Anton aus Tirol" (English single version)	3:48
5.	"Don't You Just Know It (Don't Ha Ha)" (with Captain Jack)	2:27
6.	"Little Suzie"	3:07
7.	"Never Stop the Alpenpop"	3:57
8.	"Megaman"	4:16
9.	"My Bonnie Is Over the Ocean"	4:17
10.	"Anton aus Tirol" (Party Mix)	3:48
11.	"Ötztaler Hüttengaudi" (instrumental)	3:43
12.	"Gemma Bier trinken" (single version)	4:11
Total length:		44:38

Never Stop... track listing
No.	Title	Length
1.	"Hey Baby (Uhh, Ahh)"	3:37
2.	"Do Wah Diddy"	3:39
3.	"Life Is Life" (duet with Hermes House Band)	3:30
4.	"Anton aus Tirol" (English version)	3:48
5.	"Uh! Ah!" (karaoke version of "Hey Baby")	3:37
6.	"Cheerio"	3:48
7.	"Ötztaler Hüttengaudi" (instrumental)	3:43
8.	"Don't You Just Know It" (duet with Captain Jack)	2:27
9.	"Little Suzie"	3:07
10.	"Aha-Aha-Aha?" (extended mix)	5:14
11.	"Megaman"	4:16
12.	"My Bonnie Is Over the Ocean"	4:17
Total length:		45:03

Notes

- Both Never Stop the Alpenpop and Never Stop... contain the same eight tracks.
- The version of "Hey Baby" differs between versions. Early European versions contain a different mix, while later versions and Never Stop... include the more upbeat single mix.
- Never Stop... drops "Never Stop the Alpenpop", the party mix of "Anton aus Tirol" and "Gemma Bier trinken", and adds "Live Is Life" (titled "Life Is Life", as on the Australian single), a karaoke version of "Hey Baby" titled "Uh! Ah!", and an extended mix of "Aha-Aha-Aha?", originally from Das Album (2000).

== Charts ==
Chart performance for Never Stop the Alpenpop
Chart (2001–2002)	Peak position
Australian Albums (ARIA)	19
Norwegian Albums (VG-lista)	20
Swedish Albums (Sverigetopplistan)	15
UK Albums (OCC)	92
