= A Ram Sam Sam =

Moroccan children's song and game

"Ram Sam Sam"

Song
- Written: Morocco
- Songwriter: Traditional

Ram Sam Sam

"Ram Sam Sam" (Arabic: رام سام سام), also known as "A Ram Sam Sam", "Aram Sa-sa", and by other names, is a Moroccan song that has gained popularity as a children's song around the world since the mid-20th century.

== Lyrics ==
In most forms, the song has a few lyrics in the Moroccan dialect of Arabic that are continuously repeated, often with increasing speed or as a round.

Arabic	Romanization	English
ارا زم زم	Ara zam zam	[Give me(ara)zam zam(zam zam water)]
قولي قولي قولي قولي قولي	Guli guli guli guli guli	Tell tell tell tell tell [feminine imperative]
الرفيق الرفيق	Ar-rafīq ar-rafīq	Friend friend

The Liverpool folk group The Spinners presented their version of the song, which they learned from an Israeli singer, with the mistaken claim that the words were in Aramaic and meant "Get up on your horse and gallop away".

== Recording history ==
The Spinners included their version titled "Aram Sa-sa" on their 1964 album Folk at the Phil. Rolf Harris recorded the song in 1971 for Columbia Records with The Mike Sammes Singers, including additional lyrics and a distinctive arrangement with backing vocals. The 1981 hit "Wordy Rappinghood" by Tom Tom Club uses the song as a basis. Wee Sing included the song in their 1989 music video Wee Sing in Sillyville. The Basque clown trio Takolo, Pirritx, and Pirrutx (since renamed Pirritx, Porrotx, and MariMotots) recorded a version called "Aran-txan-txan". In 2009, Levon Atayan created a pop dance version called "Aram Zam Zam" and the Russian band Diskoteka Avariya released their version called "The Trendy Dance Aram Zam Zam" (Модный танец Арам Зам Зам", Modnyi tanets Aram Zam Zam). Donikkl und die Weißwürschtl recorded a German version called "Aram Sam Sam". In 2011, Gracey released a Dutch version that reached #75 on the singles charts in the Netherlands and Lorenz Büffel recorded his French version "Aramsamsam" for his album Après Ski Hits 2011.

=== Adaptations ===
- The Jewish educational television series The Magic Door, which aired in the Chicago area from 1962 to 1982, had a theme song "A Room Zoom Zoom", based on the first two lines of "Ram Sam Sam".
- "Ram Sam Sam" featured in the Tom Tom Club's "Wordy Rappinghood" on their 1981 self-titled debut album, subsequently covered by Chicks on Speed on their 2003 album 99 Cents and by Uffie and DJ Mehdi.
- The Boy Scouts of America adapted the song with the lyrics "A good Cub Scout / A good Cub Scout / A new Tiger Cub and a good Cub Scout..."
- Fast Food Rockers recorded a version in 2003 under the title "Fast Food Song" with lyrics mentioning fast food companies, notably Pizza Hut, Kentucky Fried Chicken and McDonald's. Prior to the recording, the fast-food-centric lyrics had circulated since at least 1990.
- DJ Ötzi's 2003 "Burger Dance" is a similar German version with the same fast food companies but sampling some sections of "The Battle Hymn of the Republic".
- DieAussenseiter's "Aram Sam Sam" includes additional lyrics in German and the English refrain "Jump, jump, motherfucker".
