= The Magic Door =

The Magic Door may refer to:

- The Magic Door (TV series), a 1962–1982 Jewish educational television series in Chicago, U.S.
- The Magic Door (film), a 2007 British fantasy film
- The Magic Door (album), a 2012 album by Chris Robinson Brotherhood

== See also ==
- "Magic Doors", a 2008 song by Portishead
