= Fast Food Rockers =

British pop group

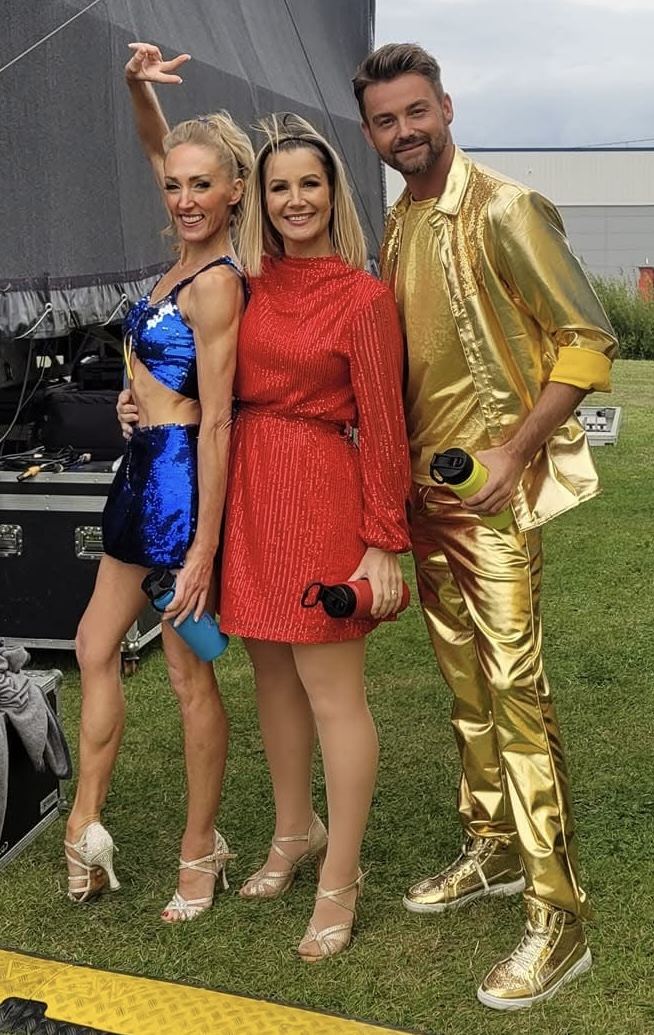
- (from left to right) Meggitt, Scott-Blyth and Rycroft in 2024

Background information
- Origin: Folkestone, England
- Genres: Bubblegum pop; novelty
- Years active: 2003–2004; 2024–present
- Label: Better the Devil Records
- Members: Ria Scott-Blyth; Lucy Meggitt; Martin Rycroft
- Website: Instagram

The Fast Food Rockers are a British bubblegum pop pop group known briefly in 2003 for their novelty music. The band members Martin Rycroft, Lucy Meggitt and Ria Scott-Blyth met at a fast-food convention in Folkestone in the summer of 2003.

== Career ==
Their most successful hit was their 2003 release "Fast Food Song", which parodies the traditional folk melody "A Ram Sam Sam". The Dutch DJ Eric Dikeb claims to have made a Dutch song out of that traditional melody in 2001, called "Pizzahaha", explaining that at that moment, he was taking part in the Dutch television show Big Diet, in which contestants had to lose as much weight as they could over a few months. Dikeb further claims to have come up with the idea to use the names of his favourite fast-food restaurants in the song. Pizzahaha did not make it to the Dutch charts, but in Belgium the band Dynamite made a big hit out of it, with a Belgian version called "De Pizzadans". It also topped the charts in Germany, called "Burgerdance", by DJ Ötzi.

The Fast Food Rockers' version, adapted by Mike Stock, Steve Crosby and Sandy Rass, was the first release of independent record label Better The Devil Records. In June 2003 it reached #2 in the UK Singles Chart, despite the criticism of cultural analysts who lamented the "collapse of culture into product placement". The single would go on to sell 150,000 copies in the UK, and was in the year-end Top 40. Their second single, "Say Cheese (Smile Please)", reached #10.

After their attempt at a Christmas single only reached #25, and an album that failed to make the charts, the group disbanded in March 2004. After the disbandment, the band members found non-music-related jobs, and in 2006, former band member Martin Rycroft left his job as a bartender to take part in the Channel 4/E4 show Boys Will Be Girls, where three former male popstars (including Russ Spencer from Scooch) tried to convincingly create a new girl band by former Brother Beyond star Nathan Moore.

In 2003, rumours surfaced that the band did not sing on their own records. However, in an interview with CBBC Newsround, Meggitt stated she "trained for three years at a performing arts school, Ria's been in the business for a long time, Martin's been in the business for a long time and we're very proud to say we do sing on [this] song".

In August 2024 they performed at the Lincoln Pride festival. They have also performed at Hull Pride in 2026, and attended the switching on of town Christmas lights in Wythenshawe and Hereford. They performed at the East Riding Of Yorkshire and Haverfordwest Carnival 2026.

== Discography ==
=== Albums ===
Title	Details
It's Never Easy Being Cheesy	Released: 17 November 2003; Label: Better the Devil; Formats: Digital download, CD

=== Singles ===
Title	Year	Peak chart positions			Album
Title	Year	UK	AUS	SCO	Album
"Fast Food Song"	2003	2	56	1	It's Never Easy Being Cheesy
"Say Cheese (Smile Please)"	2003	10	–	10	It's Never Easy Being Cheesy
"I Love Christmas"	2003	25	–	22	Non-album single
