= Smile Please =

Smile Please may refer to:

- Smile Please (company), a Japanese production company
- Smile Please (2014 film), an Indian Odia film of 2014
- Smile Please (2017 film), an Indian Kannada-language film
- Smile Please (2019 film), an Indian Marathi-language film
- "Smile Please", a 1970 Herman's Hermits song, B-side to the single "Years May Come, Years May Go"

== See also ==
- "Say Cheese (Smile Please)", a 2003 song by British band Fast Food Rockers
