= Ein Stern (...der deinen Namen trägt) =

2007 single by DJ Ötzi

Single by DJ Ötzi featuring Nik P.

from the album Sternstunden
- Released: 2 February 2007
- Length: 3:22 (radio mix); 3:55 (party style)
- Label: Polydor
- Songwriter(s): Nikolaus Presnik
- Producer(s): Tandris; Ivo Moring

DJ Ötzi featuring Nik P. singles chronology
| "I Am the Musicman" (2006) | "Ein Stern (...der deinen Namen trägt)" (2007) | "I will leb'n" (2007) |

"Ein Stern (...der deinen Namen trägt)" (lit. "A Star (...That Bears Your Name)") is a song by Austrian singers DJ Ötzi and Nik P. It was released in February 2007 as the lead single from the album Sternstunden. The song reached number one in Germany, where it stayed for 11 weeks, and in Austria despite that at the time of its release, several popular radio stations in Austria and Germany refused to play the song because its genre did not fit their programme style. The song is Germany's best-selling single of the 2000s decade, and it has sold more than two million copies.

== Background and release ==
Seven years after his smash hit "Hey Baby", DJ Ötzi released this single with the Austrian singer Nik P., who had written and released this song under his own name eight years ago. At the end of 2006, a German Schlager artist called Nic popularized a version of Nik P.'s "Einen Stern...", amongst the vacationing German club scene in Mallorca, Spain, where Schlagermusik is particularly popular. One month later, Ötzi recorded this single again and released it. The track debuted at number one in Austria, and two weeks later, topped the German Singles Chart, keeping Nelly Furtado's "Say It Right" at number two for nine non-consecutive weeks.

Spending 106 weeks on the German Singles Chart, "Ein Stern (...der deinen Namen trägt)" is the first song to be on that chart for two years or longer and also makes it the song with the longest run ever on that chart. It was Germany's most successful song of both 2007 and the 2000s decade.

== Track listings ==
CD single

1. "Ein Stern (...der deinen Namen trägt)" (party mix) – 3:55
2. "Ein Stern (...der deinen Namen trägt)" (ballad version with orchestra) – 3:28

CD single: Single Pur series

1. "Ein Stern (...der deinen Namen trägt)" (party mix) – 3:55
2. "Ein Stern (...der deinen Namen trägt)" (radio mix) – 3:22

Maxi-CD single

1. "Ein Stern (...der deinen Namen trägt)" (party mix) – 3:55
2. "Ein Stern (...der deinen Namen trägt)" (radio mix) – 3:22
3. "Ein Stern (...der deinen Namen trägt)" (extended mix) – 4:20
4. "Ein Stern (...der deinen Namen trägt)" (karaoke mix) – 3:55
5. "Ein Stern (...der deinen Namen trägt)" (video)

Maxi-CD single: Platinum edition

1. "Ein Stern (...der deinen Namen trägt)" (party mix) – 3:55
2. "Ein Stern (...der deinen Namen trägt)" (radio mix) – 3:22
3. "Ein Stern (...der deinen Namen trägt)" (extended mix) – 4:20
4. "Ein Stern (...der deinen Namen trägt)" (karaoke mix) – 3:55
5. "Ein Stern (...der deinen Namen trägt)" (music clip with unreleased bonus footage and making-of)
6. "Ein Stern (...der deinen Namen trägt)" (karaoke singalong video)

Maxi-CD single: Winter edition

1. "Ein Stern (...der deinen Namen trägt)" (ballad version with orchestra) – 3:28
2. "Ein Stern (...der deinen Namen trägt)" (party mix) – 3:55
3. "Ein Stern (...der deinen Namen trägt)" (radio mix) – 3:22
4. "Ein Stern (...der deinen Namen trägt)" (backstage music clip video)
5. "Ein Stern (...der deinen Namen trägt)" (karaoke version video)

== Charts and sales ==
=== Weekly charts ===
| Chart (2007–2008) | Peak position |
|---|---|
| Austria (Ö3 Austria Top 40) | 1 |
| Europe (Eurochart Hot 100) | 5 |
| Germany (GfK) | 1 |
| Switzerland (Schweizer Hitparade) | 2 |

=== Decade-end charts ===
| Chart (2000–2009) | Position |
|---|---|
| Germany (Official German Charts) | 1 |

=== Year-end charts ===
| Chart (2007) | Position |
|---|---|
| Austria (Ö3 Austria Top 40) | 1 |
| Europe (Eurochart Hot 100) | 6 |
| Germany (Media Control GfK) | 1 |
| Switzerland (Schweizer Hitparade) | 1 |

| Chart (2008) | Position |
|---|---|
| Austria (Ö3 Austria Top 40) | 51 |
| Europe (Eurochart Hot 100) | 56 |
| Germany (Media Control GfK) | 25 |
| Switzerland (Schweizer Hitparade) | 9 |

== Certifications ==
| Region | Certification | Certified units/sales |
|---|---|---|
| Austria (IFPI Austria) | 2× Platinum | 60,000^{*} |
| Germany (BVMI) | 4× Platinum | 1,200,000^{‡} |
| Switzerland (IFPI Switzerland) | Gold | 15,000^{^} |
^{*} Sales figures based on certification alone.^{^} Shipments figures based on certification alone.^{‡} Sales+streaming figures based on certification alone.

== Release history ==
| Region | Date | Format(s) | Label(s) | Ref. |
|---|---|---|---|---|
| Austria | 2 February 2007 | CD | Polydor | |
| Germany | 2 February 2007 | CD | Polydor | |
| Switzerland | 2 February 2007 | CD | Polydor | |

== Covers in other languages ==
The song has been covered in Dutch by the Belgian singer Christoff as Een Ster ('A Star'). It's also covered in Estonian by the Estonian punk-rock singer Laur Teär as "Ainus tee" ('Only Way'), in Lithuanian by Inga Valinskienė as "Žvaigždė" and in Italian by Chris Valco in a version written by Marco Tepoorten and approved by the author . In Denmark the song is famous in a Danish version with the band "Kandis", with the title, Det Dit Navn (It's your name). The Slovenian version of the song, sung by Miran Rudan, is called "Na nebo" ('Onto the Sky'). In 2018 Titanix released a Swedish version with the title "En stjärna med ditt namn" (A star with your name)
