= Donauer =

Donauer is a German language habitational surname. Notable people with the name include:

- Andreas Donauer (1976), German producer, musician, composer, lyricist and educator
- Hans Donauer (c. 1521 – 1596), German Renaissance painter
