= Say Cheese (disambiguation) =

Say cheese is an instruction used by photographers who want their subject to smile.

Say Cheese may refer to:

- "Say Cheese" (How I Met Your Mother), a 2010 television episode
- "Say Cheese" (Raising Hope), a 2010 television episode
- Say Cheese (novel), English title of the 1983 novel Скажи изюм by Russian writer Vasily Aksyonov
- Say Cheese (TV series), a 2018 Singaporean series
- "Say Cheese (Smile Please)", a song recorded by Fast Food Rockers in 2003
- "Say Cheese", a song recorded by Poppy from Eat (NXT Soundtrack) in 2021
- "Say Cheese", a song recorded by Paul Russell, 2024

== See also ==
- "Say Cheese, Please", a Roland and Rattfink animated short
- Soy cheese
