= Nik P. =

Austrian schlager singer

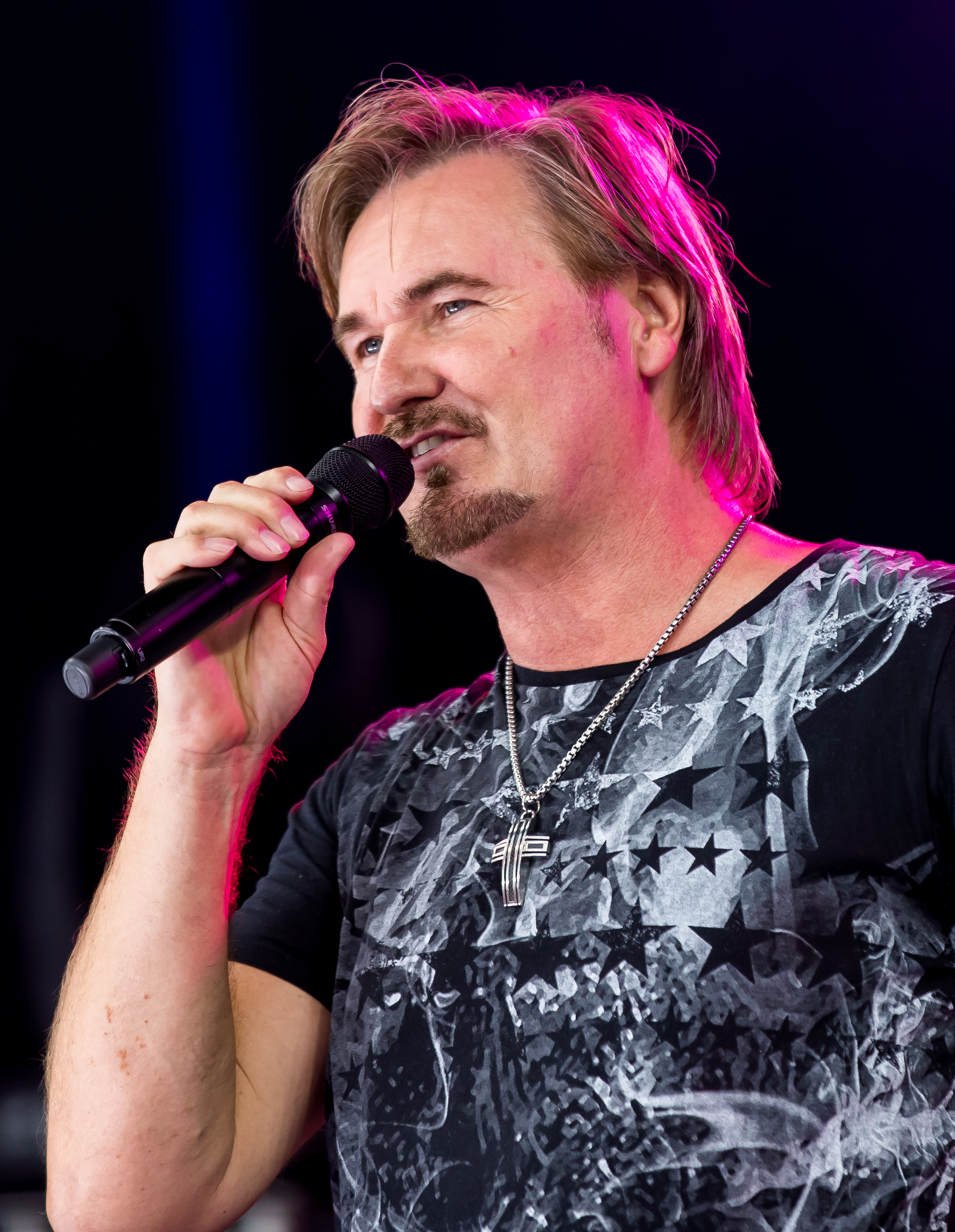
- Nik P. performing in 2016

Background information
- Birth name: Nikolaus Presnik
- Born: 6 April 1962 (age 62); Friesach, Austria
- Genres: Schlager
- Occupation: Singer
- Years active: 1990s–present

Nikolaus Presnik (born 6 April 1962), better known as Nik P., is an Austrian schlager singer.

== Biography ==
Born in Friesach, Nik P. moved to Straßburg, Austria with his family after the death of his mother. He learned to play the guitar at a young age and at age 19 he established—together with his cousin Gottfried Notsch—the musical group Reflex, playing local gigs. He met producer Klaus Bartelmuss recording his first studio album Gebrochenes Herz as 'Nik P und Band' in 1997. His debut single was "Dream Lover".

In 2005, Nik P. separated from Reflex and his album Lebenslust und Leidenschaft was certified platinum in Austria. In 2007, the song "Ein Stern (...der deinen Namen trägt)", performed by Nik P. and DJ Ötzi, became a big commercial success, peaking at number 1 in Austria, Germany and Switzerland. It was certified platinum both in Austria and Germany and gold in Switzerland. In 2008, based on this success, he won the Echo Music Prize for "Single of the Year" for the song.

== Discography ==
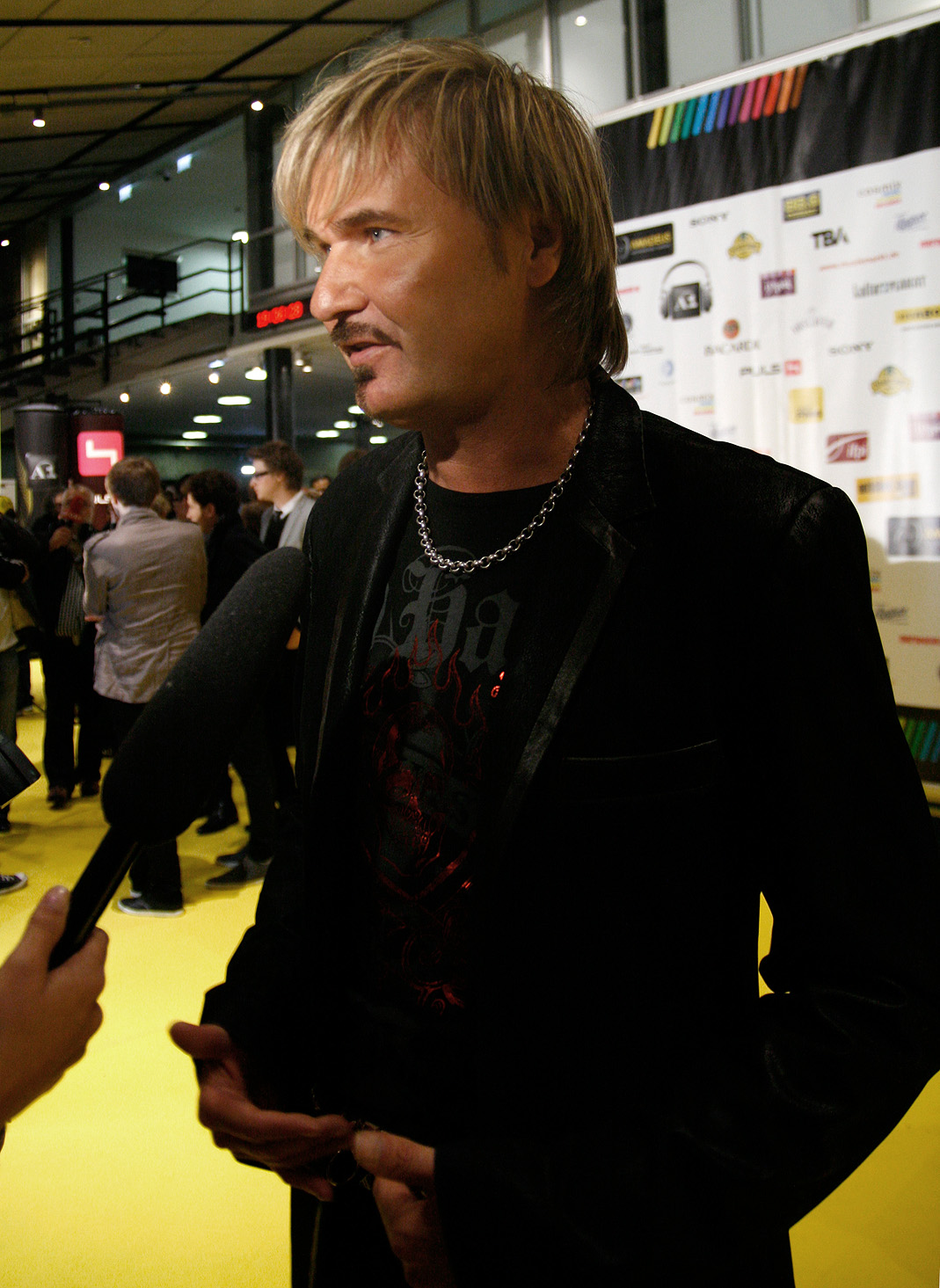
Nic P. in 2010

=== Albums ===
Studio albums

Year	Album	Peak positions			Certification
Year	Album	AUT	GER	SWI	Certification
1997	Gebrochenes Herz	—	—	—	
1998	Mit dir	—	—	—	
1999	Du bist die Sonne (as Nik P. & Reflex)	27	—	—	
2000	Du und ich (as Nik P. & Reflex)	47	—	—	
2001	Wie der Wind (as Nik P. & Reflex)	30	—	—	
2003	Superstar	17	—	—	
2005	Briefe an den Mond	8	—	—	
2006	Lebenslust & Leidenschaft	4	89	—	IFPI AUT: Platinum
2008	Freudentränen	4	—	86	
2009	Weißt du noch …	3	81	75	
2011	Der Junge mit der Luftgitarre	1	25	29	IFPI AUT: Gold
2012	Bis ans Meer	1	41	77	IFPI AUT: Gold
2014	Löwenherz	3	33	26	IFPI AUT: Platinum
2017	Ohne wenn und aber	1	19	15	
2021	Seelenrausch	1	10	4	
2024	Was wirklich zählt	4	25	7	

Live albums

Year	Album
2015	Löwenherz – Live

Compilation albums

Year	Album	Peak positions			Certification
Year	Album	AUT	GER	SWI	Certification
2003	Best Of	55	—	—	
2007	Hit auf Hit	11	—	—	IFPI AUT: Gold
2007	Best of Folge 2	13	—	—	
2008	Gold	47	—	—	
2014	Best Of	23	—	—	
2016	Da oben #16	1	11	2	IFPI AUT: Gold

Remix albums

Year	Album	Peak positions		
Year	Album	AUT	GER	SWI
2012	Come on Let's Dance – Best of Remix	1	64	57

Christmas albums

Year	Album	Peak positions
Year	Album	AUT
2008	Ein Stern – Weihnachten mit Nik P.	32

=== Singles ===
Year	Album	Peak positions			Certification
Year	Album	AUT	GER	SWI	Certification
2004	"Lovin' You"	36	—	—	Briefe an den Mond
2006	"Ein Stern (...der deinen Namen trägt)"	29	89	—	Mit dir
2007	"Sommerwein, wie die Liebe süß und wild"	45	59	—	Hit auf Hit
2009	"Der Mann im Mond"	52	—	—	Weißt du noch ...
2011	"Wo die Liebe deinen Namen ruft"	30	—	—	Der Junge mit der Luftgitarre
2014	"Geboren um dich zu lieben"	4	—	—	Löwenherz
2016	"Geboren um dich zu lieben" (DJ Ötzi & Nik P.)	6	11	29	Non-album release

Featured in

Year	Album	Peak positions			Certification
Year	Album	AUT	GER	SWI	Certification
2007	"Ein Stern (...der deinen Namen trägt)" (DJ Ötzi feat. Nik P.)	1	1	2	Sternstunden / Best of Folge 2

Other singles with Reflex

- 1997: "Gloria"
- 1999: "Weil wir tief im Herzen Kinder sind"
- 2001: "Ireen"
- 2001: "Die erste Nacht mit dir"
- 2002: "Holiday"

Other singles (solo)

- 1998: "Flieg weisser Adler"
- 2003: "Größer als alles"
- 2006: "Summerwine & Coconut"
- 2008: "Gloria II"
- 2008: "Leb deinen Traum"
- 2009: "Hundertmal..."
- 2013: "Berlin"
- 2013: "Hitmedley"
- 2016: "Da oben"
- 2016: "Lass uns unendlich sein"
- 2017: "Dieser Ring"

=== DVDs ===
- 2010: Nik P. & Band live – Ein Stern der deinen Namen trägt
- 2015: Löwenherz – Live
