= Streets of Minneapolis =

2026 Bruce Springsteen protest song

Single by Bruce Springsteen
- Written: January 24, 2026
- Released: January 28, 2026
- Recorded: January 27, 2026
- Studio: Stone Hill Studio (Colts Neck, New Jersey)
- Genre: Folk rock; heartland rock; protest song
- Length: 4:36
- Label: Columbia
- Songwriter: Bruce Springsteen
- Producers: Ron Aniello; Bruce Springsteen

Bruce Springsteen singles chronology
"Turn Back the Hands of Time" (2022)	"Streets of Minneapolis" (2026)

Music video
- "Streets of Minneapolis" on YouTube

"Streets of Minneapolis" is an anti-ICE protest song by American singer-songwriter Bruce Springsteen. It was released in 2026, in response to the killings of Renée Good and Alex Pretti, which occurred during Operation Metro Surge in Minneapolis, Minnesota, in the United States. Springsteen wrote and recorded the song following the killings by US Immigration and Customs Enforcement and US Customs and Border Protection, publishing it online four days after Pretti's death.

The song was released on January 28, 2026, on Springsteen's YouTube channel and social media, and through music streaming services. The following day, a music video for the song was also released.

The song became the number-one trending song in the United States on YouTube on the day of its release, attracting over 2.5 million views by the end of the day.

The song received a 69th Annual Grammy Awards nomination for Best Rock Song.

== Background ==
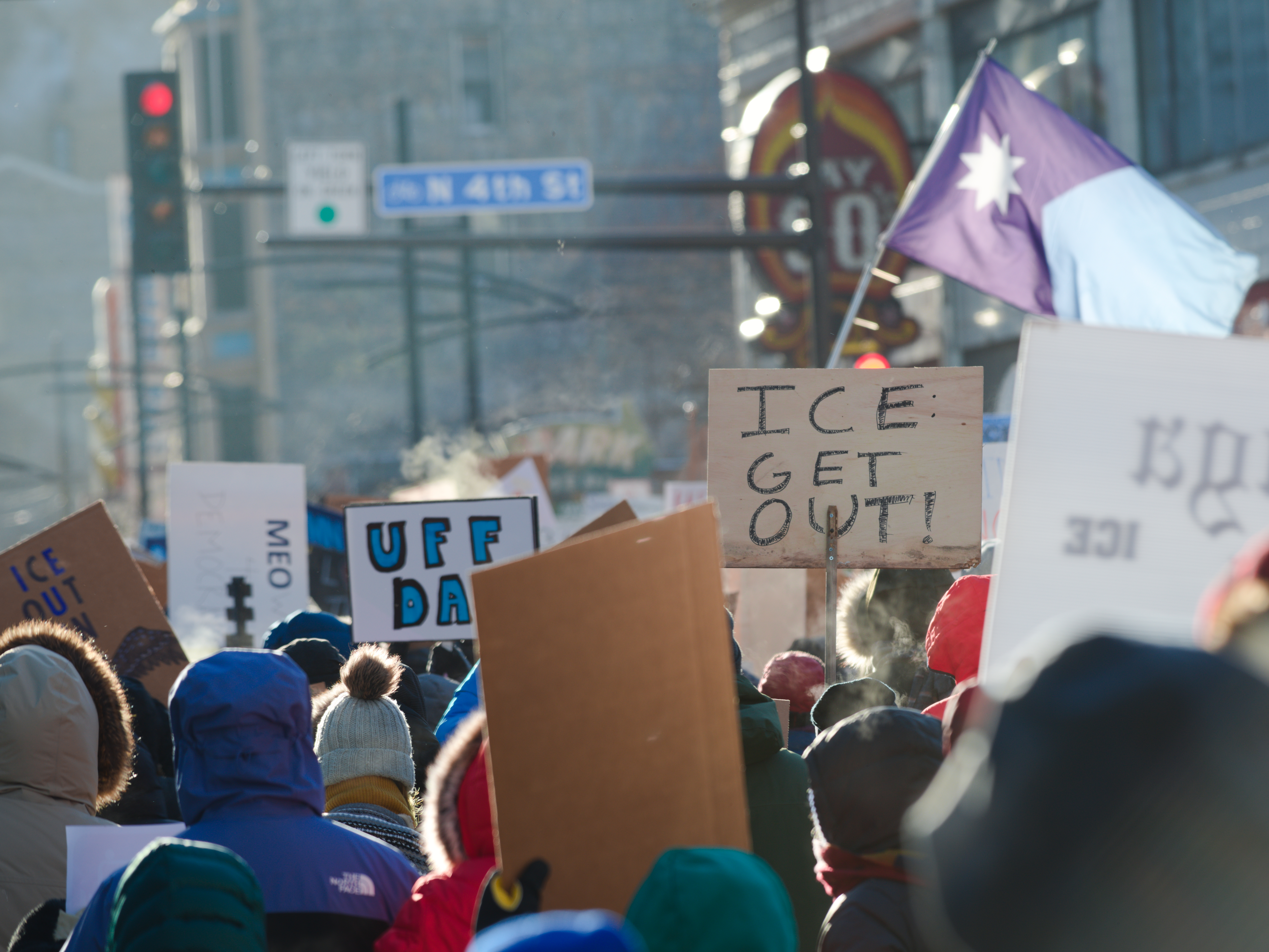
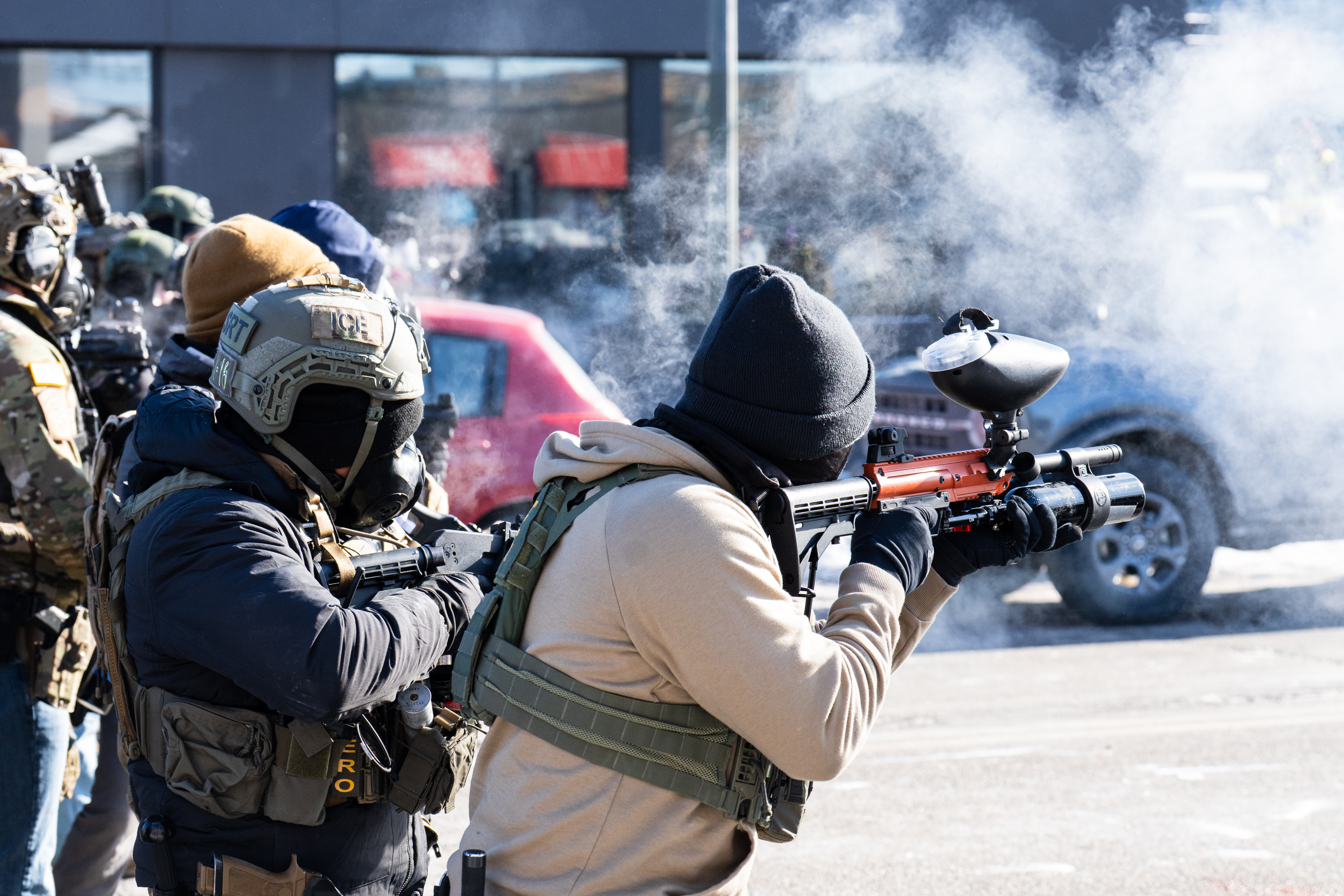
Thousands of protestors took to the streets of Minneapolis during the January 23, 2026 Minnesota protests against ICE (left), following the killings of Renée Good and Alex Pretti. This was followed by a decision to increase the activity of ICE and Border Patrol agents in the city, as part of an expanded Operation Metro Surge (right). The decision was characterized as "retribution" by the Governor and Attorney General of Minnesota.

In early January 2026, the US Department of Homeland Security (DHS) sent more than 3,000 agents to the Twin Cities in Minnesota in a dramatic escalation of immigration enforcement activities under Operation Metro Surge. Over a period of weeks, DHS agents clashed repeatedly with anti-ICE protesters, leading to the fatal shootings of Renée Good on January 7 and Alex Pretti on January 24.

On January 17, 2026, while performing at the Light of Day Winterfest in Red Bank, New Jersey, Springsteen spoke out against the ICE operations and dedicated his performance of the song "The Promised Land" to Renée Good. Within hours after news broke about the shooting of Alex Pretti on January 24, Springsteen composed "Streets of Minneapolis", recording the song on January 27 and releasing it the following day.

The Boston Globe noted the song's context alongside several other protest songs released that month, including Billy Bragg's "City of Heroes", the Dropkick Murphys' "Citizen I.C.E.", and Lucinda Williams' "World's Gone Wrong"‚ which the Globe singled out as "stellar".

== Content ==
The song's title is an allusion to "Streets of Philadelphia", the Academy Award-winning song Springsteen wrote for the 1993 film Philadelphia.

National Public Radio described it as "a full-band rock and roll song, complete with an E Street Choir singalong. Springsteen's raw and raspy voice is full of indignation as he calls out 'King Trump' and his 'federal thugs', and promises to remember the events unfolding in the streets of Minneapolis this winter. The verses narrate the killings of Good and Pretti respectively, and underline how eyewitness videos of their deaths contradict government officials' statements".

The Minneapolis Star Tribune described it as being in the "folk tradition ... detailing an injustice like Bob Dylan's 'Hurricane' or 'The Lonesome Death of Hattie Carroll' ... [that] starts out with minimalist strum and tambourine for the first verse and then a full band kicks in. When the song builds to the chorus, the Boss [Springsteen] is joined by female vocalists. There is a harmonica bridge before he rails about being deported on sight if your skin is black or brown." The lyrics characterize ICE agents as mercenaries for hire (a "private army"), and Stephen Miller and Kristi Noem's accounts of the killings as "dirty lies".

== Performances ==
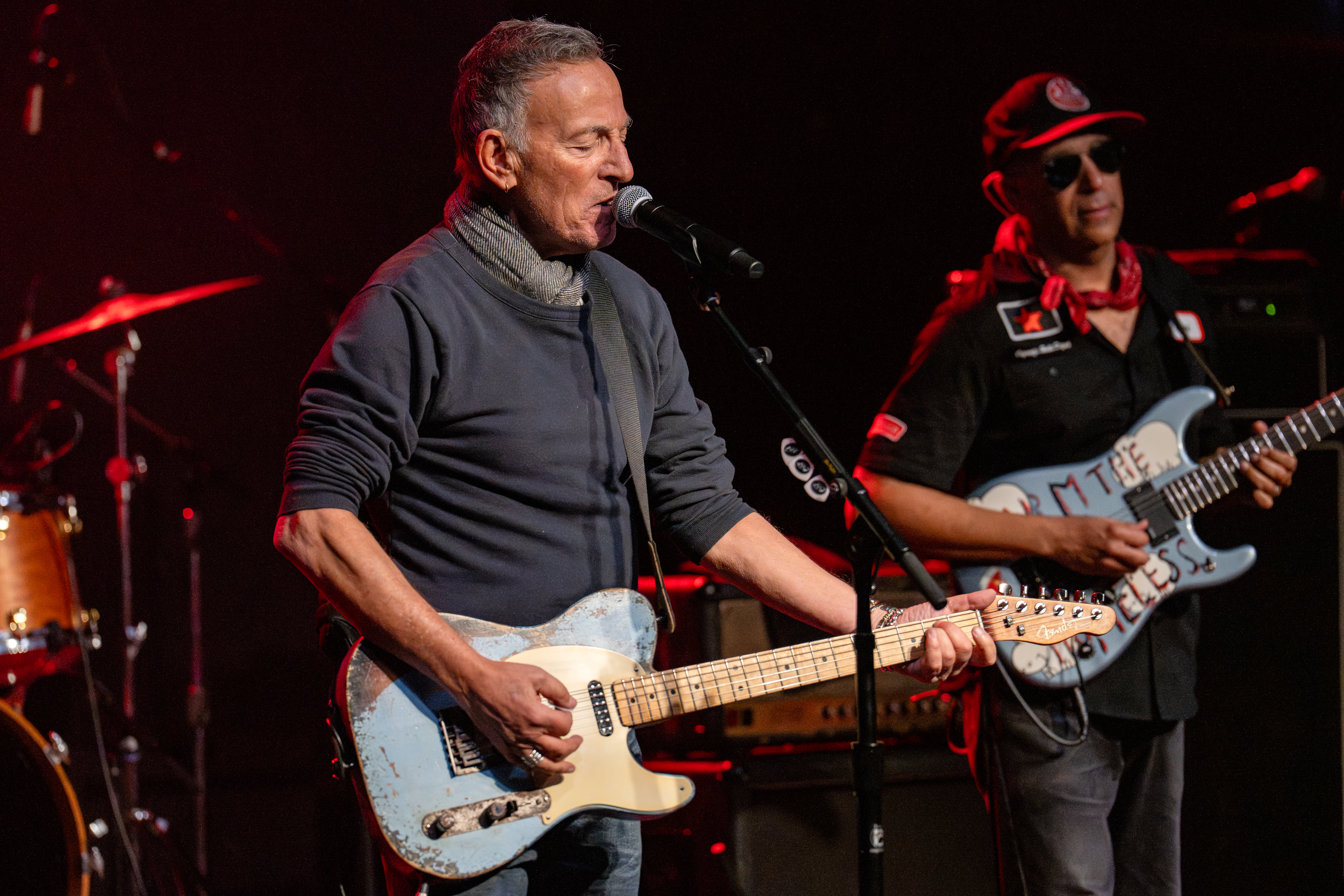
Springsteen performing "Streets of Minneapolis" alongside Tom Morello at the First Avenue venue in downtown Minneapolis

Tom Morello held a "Defend Minnesota" benefit concert on January 30, 2026, in Minneapolis along with punk band Rise Against and Bruce Springsteen, who was revealed as the surprise guest on the day of the concert. Springsteen performed a three-song set that included the live debut of "Streets of Minneapolis", his 1995 song "The Ghost of Tom Joad" featuring Morello, and John Lennon's 1971 protest anthem "Power to the People". "Defend Minnesota" was described as "a concert of solidarity and resistance". Morello said that 100 percent of proceeds would "go to the families of those murdered by ICE in Minneapolis, Renee Good and Alex Pretti".

Springsteen made a surprise appearance at the Democracy Now! 30th anniversary event in New York at the Riverside Church on March 23, 2026, where he performed "Streets of Minneapolis" and joined Patti Smith, Michael Stipe, and others for a cover of Smith's "People Have the Power".

Springsteen played the song at a No Kings rally in Saint Paul, Minnesota, on March 28, 2026.

The song was performed for the first time with the E Street Band at the 2026 Land of Hope and Dreams American Tour opener in Minneapolis on March 31, 2026. Springsteen also performed it on May 20, 2026, on the penultimate episode of The Late Show with Stephen Colbert, which was being cancelled following backlash over jokes he made about President Trump on his show.

== Reaction ==
On January 28, Minnesota Governor Tim Walz told reporter Jacob Soboroff that he was "pretty emotional" about the song, and compared it, stylistically, to "the Wrecking Ball Tour ... 'American Land'—[it] sounded like '41 Shots'." U.S. Senator Amy Klobuchar from Minnesota praised Springsteen and the song by saying, "Thank you Bruce Springsteen for ‘Streets of Minneapolis,’ a powerful tribute to Renee Good and Alex Pretti and to the strength of the people of Minnesota.”

The song quickly drew comparison to Crosby, Stills, Nash & Young's 1970 song "Ohio", which was written in condemnation of the Kent State shootings.

White House spokesperson Abigail Jackson said in a statement that "[t]he Trump Administration is focused on encouraging state and local Democrats to work with federal law enforcement officers on removing dangerous criminal illegal aliens from their communities—not random songs with irrelevant opinions and inaccurate information."

Steve Bannon, a staunch supporter of Trump's immigration crackdown, voiced his concern that the song could embolden resistance, saying: "It's kind of catchy. Bruce is throwing down for the revolution. Going on offense, folks."

E Street Band guitarist Nils Lofgren released the song "No Kings, No Hate, No Fear" on February 6, 2026, as a free download on his website. His song touched on the same subjects as "Streets of Minneapolis".

== Charts ==
Weekly chart performance
Chart (2026)	Peak position
Austria (Ö3 Austria Top 40)	47
Belgium (Ultratop 50 Flanders)	45
Canada Mainstream Rock (Billboard Canada)	31
Germany (GfK)	87
Ireland (IRMA)	86
Netherlands (Single Tip)	12
New Zealand Hot Singles (RMNZ)	14
Norway (IFPI Norge)	41
Sweden (Sverigetopplistan)	35
Switzerland (Schweizer Hitparade)	20
UK Singles (Official Charts)	92
US Bubbling Under Hot 100 (Billboard)	6
US Hot Rock & Alternative Songs (Billboard)	13
US Digital Song Sales (Billboard)	1

== See also ==
- "American Skin (41 Shots)" – a 2001 song by Springsteen about the police killing of Amadou Diallo
- "We Take Care of Our Own" – 2012 song by Springsteen
- "Bad News" (Zach Bryan song) – 2026 song critical of ICE
