= Fast Food Song =

2003 single by Fast Food Rockers

Single by Fast Food Rockers

from the album It's Never Easy Being Cheesy
- Released: 16 June 2003
- Length: 3:10
- Label: Better the Devil
- Songwriters: Mike Stock; Steve Crosby; Sandy Rass; Eric Dikeb; Martin Neumayer; Bob Patmore
- Producers: Mike Stock; Steve Crosby; Sandy Rass

Fast Food Rockers singles chronology
"Fast Food Song" (2003)	"Say Cheese (Smile Please)" (2003)

Music video
- "Fast Food Song" on YouTube

"Fast Food Song" is a song made famous by British-based band Fast Food Rockers, although it existed long before they recorded it, as a popular children's playground song. The chorus is based on the Moroccan folk tune "A Ram Sam Sam" and mentions fast food restaurant chains McDonald's, Kentucky Fried Chicken and Pizza Hut. The lyrics have circulated since at least 1990.

The song was released on 16 June 2003 as the lead single from their album It's Never Easy Being Cheesy. The song was highly successful in the United Kingdom, reaching number two on the UK Singles Chart and number one on the Scottish Singles Chart. The song also achieved minor chart success worldwide and reached number 24 on the Irish Charts and number 56 on the Australian ARIA Singles Chart. The song was co-written and produced by Mike Stock.

The original version of this song was written and recorded in Dutch by Eric Dikeb, called "Pizza-ha-ha", even though it is better known as "De Pizza Hut". "Fast Food Song" is only one of the many adaptations of the Dutch original. Other versions include "De pizza dans" by Dynamite, which was a number-one hit in Belgium's Flanders region, and "Burger Dance" by DJ Ötzi and Dikeb, which reached number one in Germany.

== Track listings ==
All tracks are credited to Mike Stock, Steve Crosby, Sandy Rass, Eric Dikeb, Martin Neumayer, and Bob Patmore.

UK CD single and Dutch maxi-CD single

1. "Fast Food Song" ('Deep Pan' radio mix) – 3:10
2. "Fast Food Song" (Extra Large 'Deep Pan' radio mix) – 4:16
3. "Fast Food Song" (Shanghai Surprise 'Go Large' club mix) – 6:05
4. "Fast Food Song" (Sing-A-Long-A-Fast-Food) – 3:08
5. "Fast Food Song" (video)

UK cassette single

1. "Fast Food Song" ('Deep Pan' radio mix) – 3:10
2. "Fast Food Song" (Sing-A-Long-A-Fast-Food) – 3:08

== Charts ==
=== Weekly charts ===
Chart (2003)	Peak position
Australia (ARIA)	56
Europe (Eurochart Hot 100)	8
Ireland (IRMA)	24
Scottish Singles Sales (Official Charts)	1
UK Singles (Official Charts)	2
UK Indie (Official Charts)	1

=== Year-end charts ===
Chart (2003)	Position
UK Singles (OCC)	37

== Certifications ==
Region	Certification	Certified units/sales
United Kingdom (BPI)	Silver	200,000^{‡}
^{‡} Sales+streaming figures based on certification alone.

== Release history ==
Region	Date	Format(s)	Label(s)	Ref.
United Kingdom	16 June 2003	CD	Better the Devil	
Australia	7 July 2003	CD	Sony Music Entertainment Australia	

== DJ Ötzi version ==
"Burger Dance"

Single by DJ Ötzi featuring Eric Dikeb

from the album Flying to the Sky
- Released: 28 July 2003
- Length: 3:24
- Label: Polydor
- Songwriters: Eric Dikeb; Gerhard Friedle; Van Hoover
- Producers: Martin Neumayer; N-Dee; Frank Lio

DJ Ötzi singles chronology
"Ramalamadingdong" (2003)	"Burger Dance" (2003)	"Not Without Us" (2004)

A version recorded by Austrian singer DJ Ötzi featuring Eric Dikeb was released in July 2003 titled "Burger Dance". It reached number one in Germany, number three in Austria, and number seven in Switzerland.

The song is based on the original Dutch "Pizza ha-ha", including the parts that invite audience participation. It therefore also uses samples of "A Ram Sam Sam" and some sections of "The Battle Hymn of the Republic" particularly "Glory Glory Hallelujah".

=== Track listing ===
German maxi-CD single

1. "Burger Dance" (party version) – 3:24
2. "Summer of '69" – 3:21
3. "Burger Dance" (international remix) – 3:17
4. "Burger Dance" (single version) – 3:42
5. "Burger Dance" (karaoke version) – 3:24

=== Charts ===
==== Weekly charts ====
Chart (2003–2004)	Peak position
Austria (Ö3 Austria Top 40)	3
Europe (Eurochart Hot 100)	8
Germany (GfK)	1
Hungary (Dance Top 40)	24
Switzerland (Schweizer Hitparade)	7

==== Year-end charts ====
Chart (2003)	Position
Austria (Ö3 Austria Top 40)	18
Germany (Media Control GfK)	26
Switzerland (Schweizer Hitparade)	42

=== Certifications ===
Region	Certification	Certified units/sales
Austria (IFPI Austria)	Gold	15,000^{*}
Germany (BVMI)	Gold	150,000^{^}
^{*} Sales figures based on certification alone.^{^} Shipments figures based on certification alone.
