= Hey! Baby =

1961 single by Bruce Channel

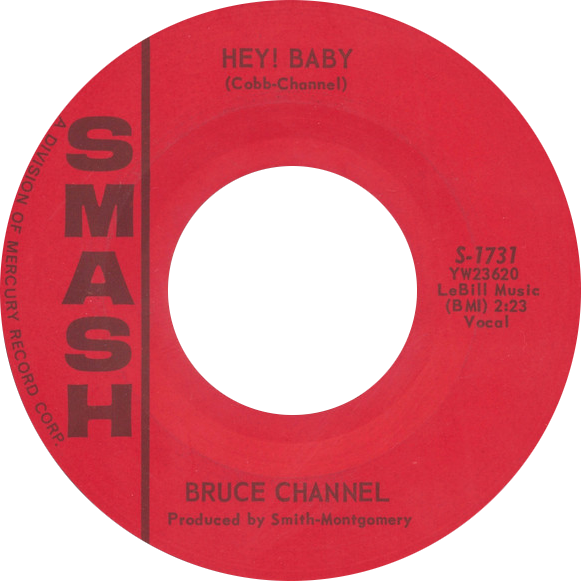
- Side-A labels of the US single

Single by Bruce Channel

from the album Hey! Baby
- B-side: "Dream Girl"
- Released: December 1961
- Studio: Clifford Herring Studios (Fort Worth, Texas)
- Genre: Pop
- Length: 2:27
- Label: LeCam; Smash; CBS (US)
- Songwriters: Margaret Cobb; Bruce Channel
- Producers: Bruce Channel; Major Bill Smith

Bruce Channel singles chronology
"Now or Never" (1960)	"Hey! Baby" (1961)	"Run Romance Run" (1962)

Audio video
- "Hey! Baby" on YouTube

"Hey! Baby" is a song written by Margaret Cobb and Bruce Channel, recorded at Clifford Herring Studios in Fort Worth, Texas, by Channel in 1961. First released on a local Fort Worth label, LeCam Records. After it hit, it was released on Smash Records for national distribution. Channel co-produced the song with Major Bill Smith (owner of LeCam) and released it on Mercury Records' Smash label. It reached number one on the Billboard Hot 100 for three weeks, starting the week ending March 10, 1962.

The song features a prominent harmonica melody performed by Delbert McClinton. Other musicians on the record included Bob Jones and Billy Sanders on guitar, Ray Torres on drums, and Jim Rogers on bass.

According to a 2002 CNN article McClinton met John Lennon while touring on the same bill as The Beatles, and gave Lennon some harmonica tips. Lennon put the lessons to use right away on "Love Me Do" and later "Please Please Me". Lennon included a version of "Hey! Baby" in his personal jukebox, and the song is also featured on the 2004 related compilation album John Lennon's Jukebox. Ringo Starr recorded a version of "Hey! Baby" in 1976.

"Hey! Baby" was used in the 1987 hit film Dirty Dancing.

== Charts ==
Chart (1962)	Peak position
New Zealand (Lever Hit Parade)	1
UK Singles Chart	2
US Billboard Hot 100	1
US Hot R&B Sides (Billboard)	2

== Anne Murray version ==
"Hey! Baby!"

Single by Anne Murray

from the album The Hottest Night of the Year
- B-side: "Song for the Mira"
- Released: May 1982
- Genre: Country
- Length: 2:47
- Label: Capitol
- Songwriters: Margaret Cobb; Bruce Channel
- Producer: Jim Ed Norman

Anne Murray singles chronology
"Another Sleepless Night" (1982)	"Hey! Baby!" (1982)	"Somebody's Always Saying Goodbye" (1982)

Audio video
- "Hey! Baby!" on YouTube

Canadian country pop singer Anne Murray covered the song in 1982, reaching number seven on the US Country Singles chart and number 26 on the Adult Contemporary chart. Murray also reached number one on the RPM country and adult contemporary charts in Canada.

=== Charts ===
Chart (1982)	Peak position
Canada Adult Contemporary Tracks (RPM)	1
Canada Country Tracks (RPM)	1
US Adult Contemporary (Billboard)	26
US Hot Country Songs (Billboard)	7

== DJ Ötzi version ==
"Hey Baby (Uhh, Ahh)"

Single by DJ Ötzi

from the album Love, Peace & Vollgas
- B-side: "Uh! Ah!"
- Released: July 31, 2000
- Length: 3:37
- Label: EMI
- Songwriters: Margaret Cobb; Bruce Channel
- Producers: Christian Seitz; Claus Marcus; Klaus Biedermann; Mark Duran

DJ Ötzi singles chronology
"Gemma Bier trinken" (2000)	"Hey Baby (Uhh, Ahh)" (2000)	"Doh Wah Diddy" (2001)

Music video
- "Hey Baby (Uhh, Ahh)" on YouTube

Austrian artist DJ Ötzi recorded a cover version titled "Hey Baby (Uhh, Ahh)". It was released in July 2000 as the lead single from his debut solo album, Love, Peace & Vollgas. This version reached number one in the United Kingdom, Ireland, and Australia. In 2002, it was re-released when it became the unofficial theme song for the 2002 FIFA World Cup. In the United States, the song was released to promote the 2003 buddy comedy film Kangaroo Jack. At Australian music festivals the song is routinely sung a capella by the crowd as a way to pass the time between sets.

=== Music video ===
The official music video features large groups of people singing along to the song in a London taxi at different times, interspersed with DJ Ötzi singing on a TV screen. An animated music video was also produced featuring a cartoon version of DJ Ötzi performing with a band of robots while trying to woo a princess.

=== Track listings ===
Standard maxi-CD and cassette single

1. "Hey Baby (Uhh, Ahh)" (radio mix) – 3:36
2. "Hey Baby (Uhh, Ahh)" (club mix) – 4:15
3. "Uh! Ah!" – 3:38

European CD single

1. "Hey Baby" (Radiomix) – 3:36
2. "Anton aus Tirol" – 3:47

US CD single

1. "Hey Baby" (radio edit) – 3:36
2. "Hey Baby" (Ooh Aah radio remix) – 3:36

Canadian maxi-CD single

1. "Hey Baby" (radio mix)
2. "Hey Baby" (French version)
3. "Uh! Ah!"

=== Charts ===
==== Weekly charts ====
Chart (2000–2002)	Peak position
Australia (ARIA)	1
Austria (Ö3 Austria Top 40)	4
Belgium (Ultratip Bubbling Under Wallonia)	9
Canada (Nielsen SoundScan)	50
Denmark (Tracklisten)	2
Europe (Eurochart Hot 100)	8
Germany (GfK)	11
Ireland (IRMA)	1
Ireland Dance (IRMA)	1
Netherlands (Dutch Top 40)	8
Netherlands (Single Top 100)	56
Norway (VG-lista)	9
Scottish Singles Sales (Official Charts)	1
Sweden (Sverigetopplistan)	3
UK Singles (Official Charts)	1

==== Year-end charts ====
Chart (2000)	Position
Germany (Media Control)	60

Chart (2001)	Position
Austria (Ö3 Austria Top 40)	17
Europe (Eurochart Hot 100)	24
Germany (Media Control)	56
Ireland (IRMA)	4
Netherlands (Dutch Top 40)	56
Sweden (Hitlistan)	9
UK Singles (OCC)	5

Chart (2002)	Position
Australia (ARIA)	14
Sweden (Hitlistan)	92

=== Certifications ===
Region	Certification	Certified units/sales
Australia (ARIA)	Platinum	70,000^{^}
Austria (IFPI Austria)	Gold	20,000^{*}
Germany (BVMI)	Gold	250,000^{^}
Sweden (GLF)	Platinum	30,000^{^}
United Kingdom (BPI)	Platinum	776,000
^{*} Sales figures based on certification alone.^{^} Shipments figures based on certification alone.

=== Release history ===
Region	Version	Date	Format(s)	Label(s)	Ref.
Europe	Original	July 31, 2000	CD	EMI	
United Kingdom	Original	September 10, 2001	CD; cassette	EMI	
New Zealand	Original	October 22, 2001	CD	Shock	
Australia	Original	February 11, 2002	CD	Shock	
United Kingdom	World Cup mix	May 27, 2002	CD; cassette	EMI Liberty	

=== In popular culture ===
Darts player Tony O'Shea uses it as his walk-on song. In 2017 and 2018, Team Canada used the radio mix version of the hit as their goal song at the 2018 World Junior Ice Hockey Championships. The song has become an icon in the WJC as the song was heard around 39 times in the tournament, as the Canadian juniors scored 39 goals. In 2021, the song returned in Edmonton at the 2022 World Juniors. However, three days after the tournament began, the 2022 edition of the WJC was cancelled due to multiple COVID-19 outbreaks within teams. WWE fans often chant the song at Bayley, substituting her name for the word "baby". The song is played after the top of the 8th inning at every Toronto Blue Jays home game at the Rogers Centre to hype up the fans. In Banana Ball, popularized by the Savannah Bananas barnstorming baseball team, in the middle of the 4th inning, similar to a seventh inning stretch, both teams lead the entire stadium in a choreographed dance. In Australian Rules football, the song is played whenever AFL player Zac Bailey, who plays for the Brisbane Lions, kicks a goal.

== Other notable versions ==
- In 1963 David Box recorded his Version In Ben Hall's Studio in Big Spring
- New Zealand group the La De Da's covered it in 1967, making the song chart at number one in New Zealand twice.
- Bobby G. Rice in 1970, which reached number 35 on the country music charts.
- Ringo Starr released the song as a single, backed with "Lady Gaye", from his Ringo's Rotogravure album, on November 22, 1976, in the US (Note: US Atlantic 45-3371) (reaching number 74 US Pop), and on November 26 in the UK. (Note: UK Polydor 2001 699) Record World said that it "should bring some good time sounds to the top of the charts and end the year on a spirited note." He had also sampled it in his previous chart hit, "A Dose of Rock 'n' Roll" (reaching number 26 US Pop).
- Cooldown Café, a Dutch band, covered it in 2000; it was top-5 hit in the Netherlands.
- "Hey Baby" has become a popular terrace chant among football supporters, with the lyrics changed to refer to teams or individual players.
- DJ Ötzi's version of "Hey Baby" has been used by Major League Baseball's Colorado Rockies at home games since the 2007 season, played during the seventh inning stretch. The Rockies won the National League pennant that year.
- In 2026 during the ICE protests in Minneapolis protesters interpreted the song, with a satirical tone about Kristi Noem and the satirical and comedy content creators scaredketchup covered the protest song, for their YouTube channel.

== See also ==
- List of 1960s one-hit wonders in the United States
