= La Ola Walzer =

- 2005 single cover

Single by DJ Ötzi

from the album Servus die Wadln & La Ola Walzer
- Released: January 31, 2005
- Genre: Electronic, pop, schlager, waltz
- Length: 3:16
- Label: Polydor Associated Labels, Universal Music Group
- Songwriter(s): Frank Ramondín, Mark Nissen, Hartmut Krech
- Producer(s): Mark Nissen, Hartmut Krech

"La Ola Walzer" (Trans: The Wave Waltzer) is a song performed and recorded by Austrian artist DJ Ötzi. The song was released alongside the single "Servus die Wadln" on 31 January 2005. The single is a catchy form of 'pop waltz' song, featuring the main melody of "The Blue Danube". The song became popular following DJ Otzi's performance alongside André Rieu and the Johann Strauss Orchestra in Vienna in 2006 and in Maastricht in 2010. Since the performance there has been a small demand for an English version of the song to be released, especially in the UK.

== Track listing ==
1. "La Ola Walzer" (single mix) – 3:16
2. "La Ola Walzer" (Donau mix) – 3:30
3. "La Ola Walzer" (karaoke version) – 3:16

== Charts ==
Chart (2005)	Peak position
Austria (Ö3 Austria Top 40)	27
Germany (Media Control Charts)	40

== Release history ==
Region	Date
Austria	January 31, 2005
Germany	January 31, 2005
Switzerland	January 31, 2005
