= ICE protest songs =

Protest songs against U.S. Immigration and Customs Enforcement

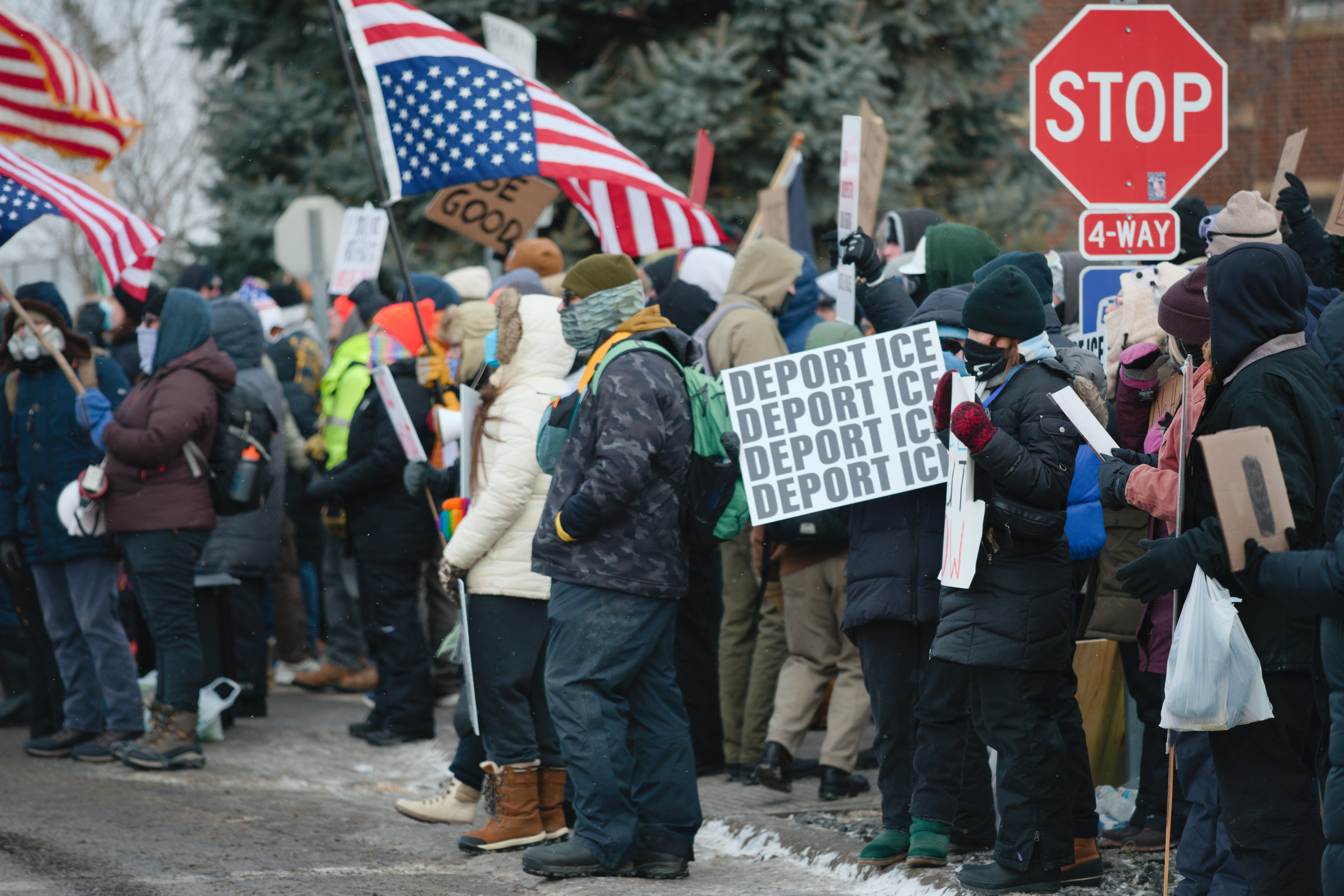
Protests against Operation Metro Surge

Many musicians have written protest songs against Immigration and Customs Enforcement (ICE) during the second presidency of Donald Trump, particularly in the wake of Operation Metro Surge, an ongoing effort on the part of ICE and sister agencies that has sent over 3,000 agents of the United States federal government into the state of Minnesota. In the course of Operation Metro Surge, federal immigration agents shot and killed U.S. citizens Renée Good and Alex Pretti, which drew significant protests from the public. Minnesotan musicians were largely the first to write anti-ICE protest songs, followed by musicians across the United States, including famous acts like Bruce Springsteen and the Dropkick Murphys. Twenty-first-century technology, including social media and artificial intelligence, significantly affected the way the anti-ICE songs were created, recorded, and distributed compared to past protest songs.

== Background ==
Starting in January 2026, thousands of agents of the United States Department of Homeland Security (DHS) – particularly ICE and Customs and Border Protection (CBP) – were sent to the Twin Cities in Minnesota with the stated purpose of arresting undocumented immigrants. 3,000 agents have been deployed in total in what was termed Operation Metro Surge. On January 7, agents shot and killed 37-year-old mother Renée Good; on January 24, agents shot and killed 37-year-old nurse Alex Pretti. Both were U.S. citizens. The Trump administration described Good as an "assassin" and Pretti as a "domestic terrorist"; video analyses have shown that Good was attempting to drive away from the agents when she was shot in her car, and, though Pretti had a gun, he never attempted to use it and was disarmed before being shot.

Operation Metro Surge and the killings of Good and Pretti have drawn significant protest, including from musicians. Many have spoken out against ICE and Metro Surge at live events, on their social media accounts, and at in-person protests; many have also written protest songs. By and large, Minnesotan musicians started writing and releasing songs first, followed by other musicians across the United States. However, some non-Minnesotan artists, like Jesse Welles of Arkansas, were part of the early wave of songs. Many of the songs are under two minutes and align with folk music. Bruce Springsteen says he wrote "Streets of Minneapolis" the same day Pretti was killed; the song criticizes Trump as a "king" using a "private army" and his administration for telling "dirty lies" about Good and Pretti's deaths. Prior to Operation Metro Surge, Dropkick Murphys frontman Ken Casey had criticized other punk musicians for not speaking out more against ICE and the administration. Some songs with lyrics criticizing ICE were already in progress or released before Metro Surge, including Zach Bryan's "Bad News", (Note: Bryan has said that his song was "misconstrued" as an ICE protest song.) Jesse Welles's "Join ICE", and "Ice Too Cold to Thaw" by David J & the Resistance.

Protest songs have a long history; Springsteen himself wrote many over decades. They are largely grouped into two categories: those that focus more on communicating the problem (like "The Times They Are a-Changin' ") and those that are meant to be sung by crowds during rallies (like freedom songs of the civil rights movement). Most ICE protest songs have been the first type. Protest songs that are sung live at protests, however, help with morale and help draw a contrast between the crowd and the comparatively aggressive agents. While protest songs are not new, 21st-century technology significantly reshaped the speed at which the ICE protest songs were created, recorded, and shared among the general public. Within days of Good's death, Jeremy Messersmith had written, recorded, and submitted "Fuck This" to Minnesota Public Radio. He then had people submit their own additions to the song, in the form of instruments and vocals, to release a "Community Choir Edition" with over 70 added tracks. One song, "Minnesota Anthem", was created with artificial intelligence.

== List ==
- "Absolute Zero", by Frozen Soul
- "American Obituary" by U2
- "Bad News" by Zach Bryan
- "Boltcutter", by the Ike Reilly Assassination
- "Boots on the Ground", by Tom Waits and Massive Attack
- "Citizen I.C.E.", by the Dropkick Murphys (Note: A re-working of their prior song, "Citizen C.I.A.")
- "City of Heroes", by Billy Bragg
- "Come Out Ye Cowards ICE", by Carsie Blanton
- "Compassion", by Cloud Cult
- "A Freedom Hymn", by Milck
- "Fuck This", by Jeremy Messersmith
- "Good vs. Ice", by Jesse Welles
- "Hold On", by Singing Resistance
- "ICE", by Waterparks
- "Join Ice", by Jesse Welles
- "Making It Great", by Dave Matthews
- "Minnesota", by Marsh Family
- "Minnesota Nazis", by NOFX
- "No Kings, No Crown", by Paul Metsa and Alan Sparhawk
- “No Kings, No Hate, No Fear,” by Nils Lofgren
- Peacelands, a benefit LP by My Morning Jacket
- "Pretend You Remember Me" by Tom Morello
- "Soldier of Fortune", by Mary Gauthier and Eliza Gilkyson
- "Streets of Minneapolis", by Bruce Springsteen
- "Told You So", by Durry
- "The World's Gone Wrong", by Lucinda Williams
