= My Heart Goes Boom (La Di Da Da) =

2000 single by French Affair

Single by French Affair

from the album Desire
- Released: 10 January 2000
- Length: 3:40 (radio edit)
- Label: RCA; BMG
- Songwriters: Barbara Alcindor; Torsten Dreyer; Karsten Dreyer
- Producers: Torsten Dreyer; Karsten Dreyer

French Affair singles chronology
"My Heart Goes Boom (La Di Da Da)" (2000)	"Do What You Like" (2000)

Music video
- "My Heart Goes Boom (La Di Da Da)" on YouTube

"My Heart Goes Boom (La Di Da Da)" is a song by German-French dance-pop act French Affair. It was released in January 2000 as the lead single from their debut album, Desire (2000). The song became a hit worldwide, topping the charts of Germany and Austria and reaching the top five in Denmark, France, Italy, Spain, and Switzerland. Although the song is mostly sung in English, it contains a verse in French.

== Music video ==
The accompanying music video for "My Heart Goes Boom (La Di Da Da)" was directed by Wiebke Berndt.

== Track listings ==
- CD maxi – Europe
1. "My Heart Goes Boom (La Di Da Da)" (radio version) – 3:39
2. "My Heart Goes Boom (La Di Da Da)" (X-tended club version) – 5:39
3. "My Heart Goes Boom (La Di Da Da)" (K's house remix) – 7:02
- CD maxi – US
1. "My Heart Goes Boom (La Di Da Da)" (radio edit) – 3:40
2. "My Heart Goes Boom (La Di Da Da)" (Plasmic honey radio edit) – 3:03
3. "My Heart Goes Boom (La Di Da Da)" (Plasmic honey big boom mix) – 7:53
4. "My Heart Goes Boom (La Di Da Da)" (Plasmic honey big boom dub) – 7:13
5. "My Heart Goes Boom (La Di Da Da)" (Bastone & Bernstein club mix) – 7:58
6. "My Heart Goes Boom (La Di Da Da)" (sharp boys festival mix) – 6:24
- 12-inch maxi
1. "My Heart Goes Boom (La Di Da Da)" (X-tended club version) – 5:39
2. "My Heart Goes Boom (La Di Da Da)" (K's house remix) – 7:02
3. "My Heart Goes Boom (La Di Da Da)" (Sharp festival remix) – 6:31
- CD single
1. "My Heart Goes Boom (La Di Da Da)" (radio version) – 3:39
2. "My Heart Goes Boom (La Di Da Da)" (K's house remix) – 7:02

== Credits ==
- Artwork (cover) – Goutte
- Lyrics By – B. Alcindor
- Lyrics By, Music By – K. Dreyer / T. Dreyer
- Photography – Kramer & Giogoli
- Producer, arranged by, mixed by – The Dreyer Bros.

== Charts ==
=== Weekly charts ===
Weekly chart performance for "My Heart Goes Boom (La Di Da Da)"
Chart (2000)	Peak position
Austria (Ö3 Austria Top 40)	1
Belgium (Ultratip Bubbling Under Flanders)	7
Belgium (Ultratop 50 Wallonia)	17
Canada (Nielsen SoundScan)	8
Canada Dance/Urban (RPM)	9
Denmark (IFPI)	4
Europe (Eurochart Hot 100)	5
France (SNEP)	4
Germany (GfK)	1
Iceland (Íslenski Listinn Topp 40)	15
Ireland (IRMA)	13
Italy (FIMI)	4
Italy Airplay (Music & Media)	4
Netherlands (Dutch Top 40)	28
Netherlands (Single Top 100)	37
New Zealand (Recorded Music NZ)	47
Scottish Singles Sales (Official Charts)	12
Spain (Promusicae)	4
Sweden (Sverigetopplistan)	35
Switzerland (Schweizer Hitparade)	3
UK Singles (Official Charts)	44
US Dance Club Play (Billboard)	24
US Maxi-Singles Sales (Billboard)	35

=== Year-end charts ===
Year-end chart performance for "My Heart Goes Boom (La Di Da Da)"
Chart (2000)	Position
Austria (Ö3 Austria Top 40)	8
Belgium (Ultratop 50 Wallonia)	59
Denmark (IFPI)	17
Europe (Eurochart Hot 100)	16
Europe Border Breakers (Music & Media)	7
France (SNEP)	19
Germany (Media Control)	11
Iceland (Íslenski Listinn Topp 40)	57
Ireland (IRMA)	66
Spain (AFYVE)	11
Switzerland (Schweizer Hitparade)	22

=== Decade-end charts ===
Decade-end chart performance for "My Heart Goes Boom (La Di Da Da)"
Chart (2000–2009)	Position
Austria (Ö3 Austria Top 40)	18

== Certifications ==
Certifications for "My Heart Goes Boom (La Di Da Da)"
Region	Certification	Certified units/sales
Austria (IFPI Austria)	Gold	25,000^{*}
France (SNEP)	Gold	250,000^{*}
Germany (BVMI)	Gold	250,000^{^}
^{*} Sales figures based on certification alone.^{^} Shipments figures based on certification alone.

== See also ==
- List of number-one hits of 2000 (Austria)
- List of number-one hits of 2000 (Germany)
