= I will leb'n =

Single by DJ Ötzi

from the album Sternstunden
- Released: (Austria) October 2007 (Germany) October 2007 (Switzerland) October 2007
- Recorded: 2007
- Genre: Schlager
- Label: UMVD

DJ Ötzi singles chronology
"Ein Stern (...der deinen Namen trägt)" (2007)	"I will leb'n" (2007)	"Noch in 100.000 Jahren" (2008)

"I will leb'n" is a song originally recorded by Austrian band Steirerbluat, later notably covered by DJ Ötzi.

== Charts ==
=== Weekly charts ===
Chart (2007–2008)	Peak position
Austria (Ö3 Austria Top 40)	6
Germany (GfK)	7
Switzerland (Schweizer Hitparade)	44

=== Year-end charts ===
Chart (2008)	Position
Austria (Ö3 Austria Top 40)	53
