= The Magic Door (TV series) =

Jewish educational television series

- Genre: Educational television
- Country of origin: United States
- Original language: English

Original release
- Network: WBBM-TV
- Release: 1 January 1962 – 1 January 1982

The Magic Door (also known as The Magic Door Television Theatre) was a Jewish educational television series, aimed at providing kiruv (outreach) to Jewish children in the Chicago metropolitan area but intended to appeal to all children in the 5-to-9-age group. The show was produced by the Chicago Board of Rabbis, and premiered January 1, 1962. The show ran weekly until January 1, 1982. It aired at 9:00 AM every Sunday on WBBM-TV.

There were two main theme songs for The Magic Door. The first, "A Room Zoom Zoom", was based on the children's song "A Ram Sam Sam". The second, written by Charles Gerber, was set to a melody from Beethoven's "Pastorale" Symphony No. 6:

"Open, come open the Magic Door with me,
With your imagination there's so much we can see.
There is a doorway that leads to a place.
I'll find my way by the smile on your face."

The main character of the series was "Tiny Tov" (an actor reduced via special effects to appear as a kind of elf) . Tiny lived in a house that was made out of an acorn; the entrance was the Magic Door. Before entering the Magic Door to reach the town of Torahville, Tiny would sing a tune with the lyrics,

"Ah room zoom zoom, ah room zoom zoom, gily gily gily gily gily a sa sa.
Come through The Magic Door with me, just say these words, and wondrous things we'll see."

In addition to Tiny and later from 1970 Tina, there were puppet characters, including Bubbe Beaver, Icky Witch, Rabbi and Mrs. Moreh, Max the Mailbox, Rumplemyer Dragon, Bunny Rabbit, Buddy, Worthington Warlock, and many others.

In the early days of the series, Tiny Tov would travel back through time riding his Magic Feather. Later on the program evolved into presenting moral topics. There would be a "Hebrew Word of the Day" that related to whatever values were being taught. Each week, Tiny Tov would educate Jewish children on Jewish history, sharing stories from Torah and Jewish tradition. Every episode would include a brief Hebrew lesson, stepping through the Aleph-Bet (Hebrew alphabet).

The character of Tiny Tov was developed by Irv Kaplan, who later moved to Israel and was instrumental in the development of Israeli Educational Television. There were four Tiny Tov actors in all. At the show's start, Irv Kaplan played the role. From 1970 to 1973, Tiny Tov was portrayed by Emmy-nominated actor Jerry (Jerome) Loeb. The second player was Charles Gerber, who also created the song lyrics. Rabbi Joe Black was the last Tiny Tov. Tina Tova was played by Fran (Uditsky) Moss. The first puppeteer was Helen Cirkle. in 1969 the show won an Emmy Award.

Another outreach children's program of the same name was produced and aired by WMAL-TV (now WJLA) in Washington, D.C. from 1969 to 1976, though it has no connection other than the name.

In the 1980s, a follow-up series was produced, Beyond the Magic Door.

Actor Dan Castellaneta (the voice of Homer Simpson and other characters on The Simpsons television series) was a semi-regular performer on The Magic Door and its spinoff, Beyond the Magic Door, from 1981 until 1984.

== Beyond the Magic Door ==
Beyond The Magic Door was a children's television show on WBBM-TV in Chicago, Illinois in the early 1980s. The show was a sequel of sorts to the earlier program The Magic Door Television Theatre.

The theme song began with the following lyrics:

If your mind is open
And free to explore
I know a place called Dreidl
It lies beyond the magic door
It's over the rainbow, through the mighty seas,...
Come follow me, through the magic door

Rusty Steiger acted as the main puppeteer. Ken Raabe acted as a puppeteer. One of his characters included J. P. Potter, a disembodied hand wielding a cigar. David C. Waite was an ensemble cast member. Dan Castellaneta briefly played the role of Detective Farblonget, which was taken over by John Szostek. In 1984 Beyond The Magic Door won an Emmy Award in the category: Series for Children's Programming. Winning Station: WBBMTV, Mindy Soble, Producer; Allen Stecher, Producer.
