= Singing Resistance =

American protest movement formed in 2026

Singing Resistance is a group of vocalists that originated in Minneapolis, Minnesota that formed as protest organization in 2026 after the killing of Renee Good. Around that time, parallel "Singing Resistance" groups formed in other American cities that were being targeted by ICE (U.S. Immigration and Customs Enforcement), in addition to groups of people in other countries sympathetic to the results of that targeting. In Minneapolis and other American cities, the organization brought together groups of local citizens to sing songs such as "This Little Light of Mine" and "We Shall Overcome" in the presence of ICE enforcement as well as the accommodations for out of town officers. In one high-profile performance that gained international attention, musician Brandi Carlile sang with the founding members of the group on stage at a fundraiser for those affected by ICE actions in Minnesota. They then began performing at other large protests in the Minnesota region.
