= Lorenz Büffel =

Austrian singer

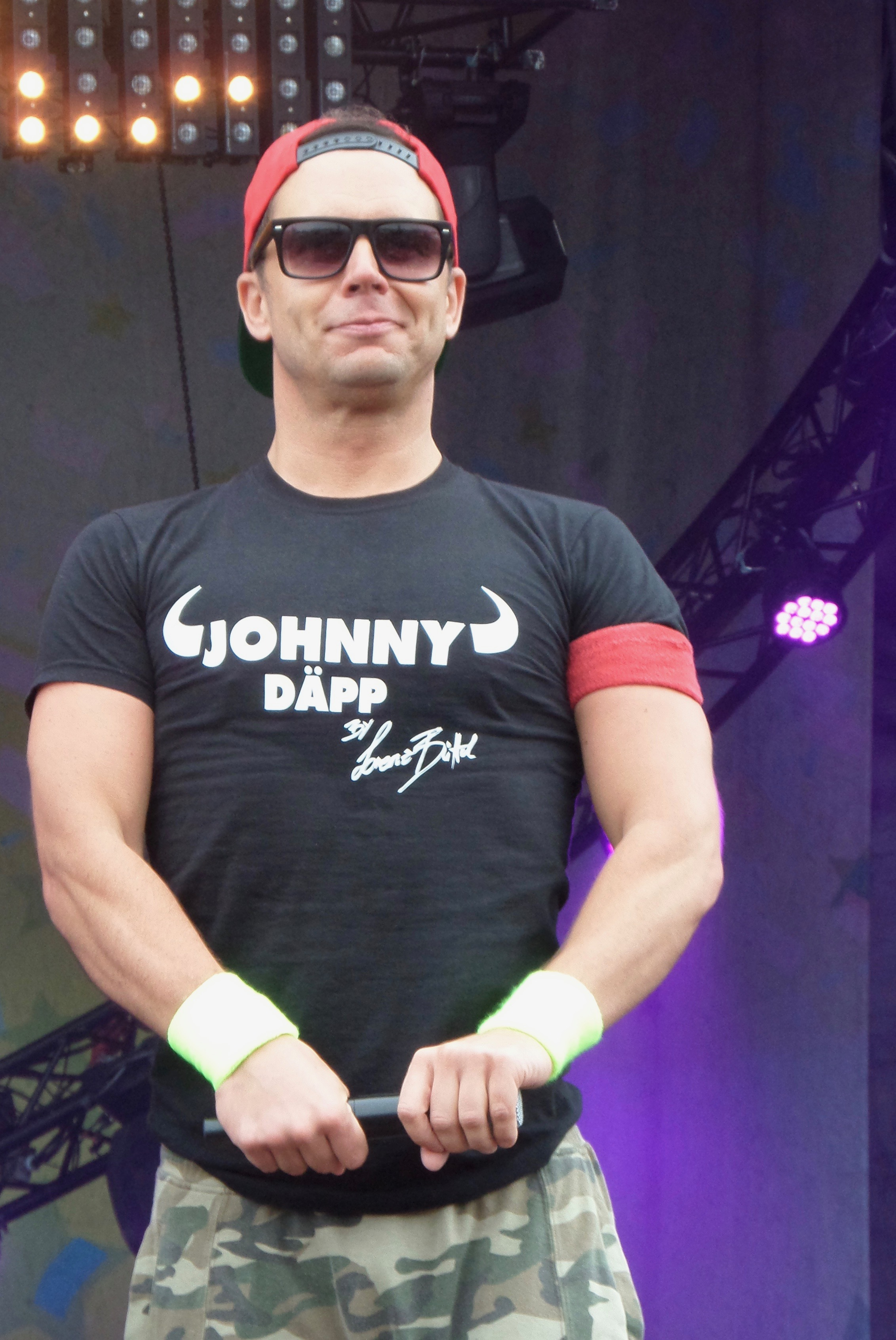
Lorenz Büffel (2017)

Stefan Scheichel (born May 29, 1979 in Krems an der Donau, Austria), better known by his stage name Lorenz Büffel, is an Austrian DJ best known for his 2016 single "Johnny Däpp".

== Life ==
Stefan Scheichel-Gierten took lessons at the Comedy Academy in Cologne and was active as a radio station manager in the 2000s and as an entertainer around the world. In 2006 he moved to Hamburg and began a new career as a comedian and this is where he began using the name Lorenz Büffel (roughly translated as "Lorenz Buffalo"). In Majorca, where he performs often; he broke his leg during a serious injury in August 2009.

His biggest musical success so far is the 2016 single "Johnny Däpp". Büffel reached the official German singles chart for the first time since 2009 with the song, peaking at number 28.
