= Donikkl Mitmach-Konzert-Show =

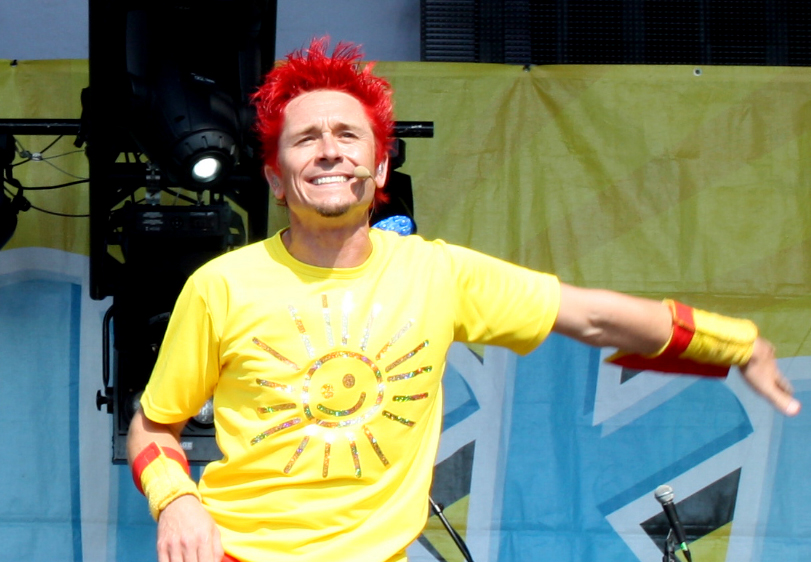
Andreas Donauer in concert

Donikkl Mitmach-Konzert-Show is a German musical band formed in Regensburg by Andreas Donauer ("Donikkl") and is made up of professional musicians and educators. The band's repertoire is directed mainly for children.

The band became known to a wider public in 2008 with their song "So ein schöner Tag (Fliegerlied)" that became a favorite at many folk festivals like Gäubodenvolksfest, the Rosenheim Autumn Festival and at Munich's Oktoberfest in 2008. The single by Donikkl was a hit in both Germany and Austria. Sandra Stumptner, under the pseudonym Antonia aus Tirol, also had a single hit with it. Another recording of the song is by Die jungen Zillertaler. However the biggest hit was a cover of the song by Tim Toupet with a German Top 10 hit, also charting in Switzerland. The song has been subject to more than 50 released covers and translated into many languages.

== Discography ==
=== Albums ===
- 2002: Kinderzimmerparty
- 2003: Baumhausgeschichten
- 2004: Stark wie ein Tiger
- 2005: Grashüpfer
- 2007: Spiel mit mir
- 2008: Rockstar
- 2009: Best of 2001-2009 (reached #97 Germany)
- 2010: Wir geh'n ab!
- 2012: Der Süden rockt!
- 2013: Lass die Sonne rein!

=== Singles ===
- 2008: "So a schöner Tag (Fliegerlied)" (reached #24 in Germany and #56 in Austria)
- 2009: "Aram Sam Sam" (reached #99 in Germany)

=== DVD ===
- 2006: Live und Kunterbunt
- 2011: Live und Kunterbunt 2
