= French Affair =

German-French dance project

- Origin: Germany; France
- Genres: Pop; dance
- Years active: 1999–2010
- Labels: BMG; RCA; Score; Universal GmbH
- Past members: Barbara Alcindor; Karsten Dreyer; Thorsten Dreyer; Aimee
- Website: frenchaffair.net

French Affair was a German-French dance project established in 1999. Composed by French singer Barbara Alcindor and German producers Torsten Dreyer and Kasten Dreyer, the band found its highest popularity in German-speaking countries and they scored a number of hits in Europe between 2000 and 2003, including "My Heart Goes Boom (La Di Da Da)", "Do What You Like", "Sexy", and "Comme ci comme ça".

== History ==
The band's lead singer, Barbara Alcindor, was born in Paris, and has worked as a fashion model in London. She met the "Dreyer Brothers" production team and signed a contract with the BMG, a German record label, before scoring the chart with the hit "My Heart Goes Boom (La Di Da Da)" in early 2000. The single was a major hit in Europe, peaking within the top 5 in many countries. It was followed by "Do What You Like", which also was a successful hit, and a debut album, Desire.

2001 saw the release of a new track, "Sexy", which also became a considerable hit. The following year the band released "I Like That", followed by another big hit: "Comme ci comme ça", released in 2003. In 2006, French Affair released their second, all-French album, Rendezvous, promoted by a single "Symphonie d'amour". The album featured vocals by Aimee, the band's new vocalist. 2008 saw the release of Belle Epoque, their last album to date.

In 2009, the group announced its dissolution.

== Members ==
- Karsten Dreyer
- Thorsten Dreyer
- Barbara Alcindor
- Aimee

== Discography ==
=== Albums ===
Year	Title	Peak chart positions			
Year	Title	AUT	GER	HUN	SWI
2001	Desire	33	67	37	21
2006	Rendezvous	—	—	—	—
2008	Belle Epoque	—	—	—	—

=== Singles ===
Year	Title	Peak chart positions						Album
Year	Title	AUS	AUT	GER	GRE	ITA	SWI	Album
2000	"My Heart Goes Boom (La Di Da Da)"	—	1	1	—	4	3	Desire
2000	"Do What You Like"	—	11	24	—	46	29	Desire
2000	"Poison"	—	—	77	—	—	—	Desire
2000	"I Want Your Love"	—	—	—	—	—	—	Desire
2001	"Sexy"	81	21	38	—	27	84	Belle Epoque
2002	"I Like That"	—	—	—	—	38	—	Belle Epoque
2003	"Comme ci comme ça"	—	45	30	3	32	100	Belle Epoque
2006	"Symphonie d'amour"	—	—	82	—	—	—	Rendezvous
2008	"Ring Ding Dong"	—	—	—	—	—	—	Belle Epoque
2008	"Into the Groove"	—	—	—	—	—	—	Non-album single

=== Extended plays (EPs) ===
- 2009: My Heart Goes Boom (Reloaded)
- 2009: Do What You Like (Reloaded)
- 2010: My Heart Goes Boom (The US Remixes)
- 2022: Sexy Remixes
- 2024: My Heart Goes Boom (with KTD Maxx)
