= Say Cheese (Smile Please) =

2003 single by Fast Food Rockers

Single by Fast Food Rockers

from the album It's Never Easy Being Cheesy
- B-side: "Stompin'"
- Released: 6 October 2003
- Length: 3:40
- Label: Better the Devil
- Songwriter(s): Mike Stock; Steve Crosby
- Producer(s): Mike Stock; Steve Crosby

Fast Food Rockers singles chronology
"Fast Food Song" (2003)	"Say Cheese (Smile Please)" (2003)	"I Love Christmas" (2003)

"Say Cheese (Smile Please)" is a song by British bubblegum pop group Fast Food Rockers, released as a single on 6 October 2003 in the United Kingdom. The single debuted and peaked at number 10 on the UK Singles Chart.

== Track listings ==
UK CD1

1. "Say Cheese" (Parmesan Pop mix) – 3:40
2. "Say Cheese" (Mag-C "Mozarella" club mix) – 5:56
3. "Say Cheese" (Sing-A-Long-A-Cheese) – 3:40
4. "Say Cheese" (video)

UK CD2

1. "Say Cheese" (Parmesan Pop mix) – 3:40
2. "Say Cheese" (LMC extended 'Fondue' remix) – 5:59
3. "Stompin'" – 3:45

UK cassette single

1. "Say Cheese" (Parmesan Pop mix) – 3:40
2. "Say Cheese" (Sing-A-Long-A-Cheese) – 3:40

== Charts ==
Chart (2003)	Peak position
Scotland (OCC)	10
UK Singles (OCC)	10
UK Indie (OCC)	4
