= DJ Ötzi =

Austrian entertainer and singer (born 1971)

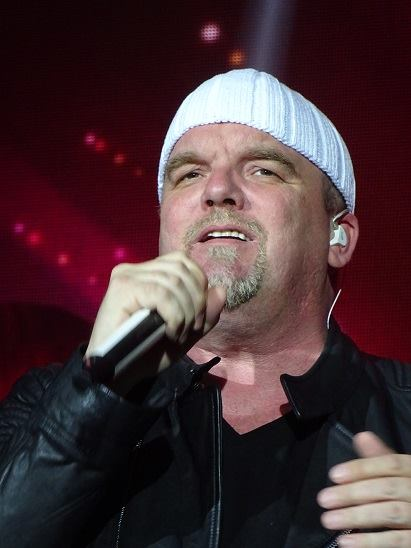
- DJ Ötzi in 2016

Background information
- Also known as: "DJ Ötzi Junior" “Anton aus Tirol”
- Born: Gerhard Friedle; 7 January 1971 (age 55); St. Johann in Tirol, Austria
- Genres: Pop, schlager, Eurodance
- Occupations: Singer, music producer
- Years active: 1999–present
- Label: EMI
- Website: djoetzi.at

Gerhard "Gerry" Friedle (born 7 January 1971), better known by his stage name DJ Ötzi (pronounced [ˈdiːdʒɛɪ ˈœtsiː]), is an Austrian music producer and singer. Successful mainly in German-speaking countries with his schlager music, he is best known in the English-speaking world for his 2000 single "Hey Baby (Uhh, Ahh)", a cover version of the Bruce Channel song "Hey! Baby". His stage name comes from Ötzi the Iceman, the name given to the 5,300-year-old frozen remains of a mummified man discovered in 1991 in South Tyrol's Ötztal Alps.

== Biography ==
=== Early life ===
Ötzi was born Gerhard Friedle in St. Johann, Tirol, the son of Anton Friedle. Shortly after birth, his mother, aged 17 at the time, gave him up for adoption. He was raised by foster parents and later by his paternal grandparents in the nearby village of Erpfendorf in Tirol. At a young age, Ötzi suffered from epilepsy. At age 16, he was homeless and lived on the streets for a short time. His career rose gradually, first working as a student cook, then upon being discovered at a karaoke competition, went on to work as an entertainer (animateur), DJ and singer in discothèques around Austria, as well as in tourist destinations Mallorca and Turkey. In 2002, before the birth of his daughter, Ötzi suffered a severe form of conductive hearing loss.

=== Musical career ===
==== Debut album and early success ====
In 1999, DJ Ötzi released the single "Anton aus Tirol". The song was a massive hit in German-speaking countries, reaching number one in Austria and Germany, while it peaked at number two in Belgium, the Netherlands, and Switzerland. The song spent 75 weeks in the Austrian charts and was number one for ten weeks. The success of the single propelled the release of the Anton (feat. DJ Ötzi) album Das Album in 2000.

==== Second album and international recognition ====
In July 2000, Ötzi released a cover version of Bruce Channel's 1962 song "Hey Baby". This single reached number-one in several English-speaking countries, including Australia, Ireland and the United Kingdom. He followed up this release with a cover version of "Do Wah Diddy".

==== Continued success ====
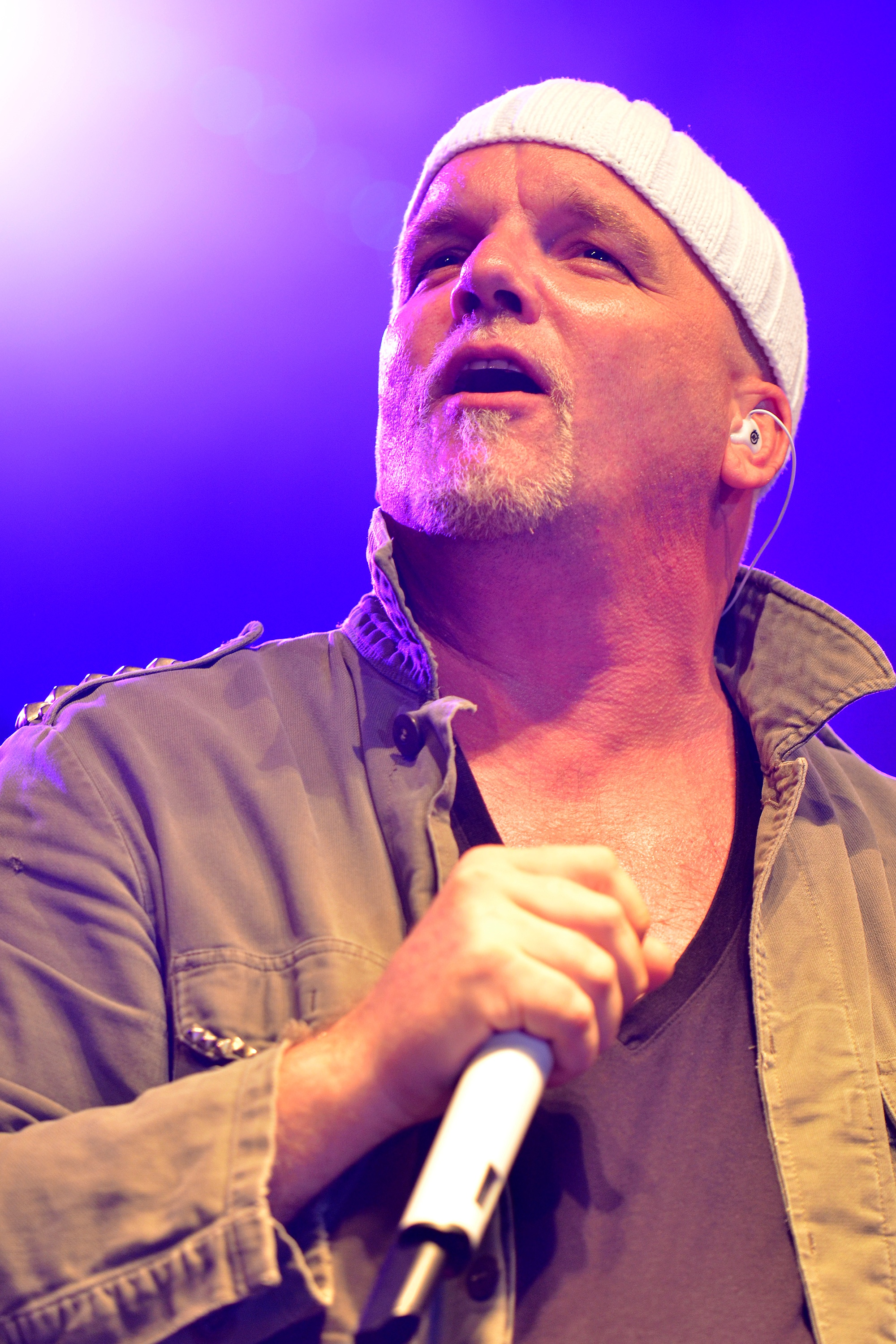
Ötzi in 2014

In 2003, Ötzi released a cover version of "A Ram Sam Sam", called the "Burger Dance", which reached number-one in Germany, number 3 in Austria, and number 7 in Switzerland.

In 2006, he found success with the Volksmusik hit "Sieben Sünden", which became a number 2 hit in Austria.

In 2007, he released "Ein Stern (...der deinen Namen trägt)" with Austrian Schlager singer Nik P. It reached number one in (Germany) where it stayed for 13 weeks and Austria, number 2 in Switzerland, and number 5 in the European Union, despite the fact that at the time of its release, some of the most popular radio stations in Austria and Germany declined to play the song because its genre did not fit their programme style. The single has sold more than 2 million copies. Spending 106 weeks on the German Singles Chart, it is the first song to be on that chart for two years or longer, and the longest running song ever on that chart.

== Discography ==
=== Albums ===
| Year | Album | Peak chart positions | | | | | | | |
| Year | Album | AUT | AUS | DEN | GER | NOR | SWE | SWI | UK |
|---|---|---|---|---|---|---|---|---|---|
| 2000 | Das Album (Anton feat. DJ Ötzi) | 1 | — | 3 | 7 | — | — | 5 | — |
| 2001 | Love, Peace & Vollgas | 2 | — | — | 23 | — | — | 23 | — |
| 2001 | Never Stop the Alpenpop / Never Stop... | — | 19 | — | — | 20 | 15 | — | 92 |
| 2002 | Today Is the Day | 3 | — | — | 49 | — | — | — | — |
| 2003 | Flying to the Sky | — | — | — | 72 | — | — | 50 | — |
| 2003 | Greatest Partyhits | 5 | — | — | 92 | — | — | — | — |
| 2004 | Ich war immer der Clown | 49 | — | — | — | — | — | — | — |
| 2006 | I Am the Musicman (DJ Ötzi Junior) | — | — | — | — | — | — | — | — |
| 2007 | Sternstunden | 2 | — | — | 7 | — | — | 16 | — |
| 2007 | DJ Ötzi: The Best | 2 | — | — | 17 | — | — | 3 | — |
| 2008 | Hotel Engel | 1 | — | — | 26 | — | — | 5 | — |
| 2010 | Du und ich | 7 | — | — | 45 | — | — | 30 | — |
| 2011 | Der DJ aus den Bergen | — | — | — | 35 | — | — | 34 | — |
| 2012 | Simply the Best (with The Bellamy Brothers) | 3 | — | 31 | 38 | — | — | 31 | — |
| 2013 | Es ist Zeit | 2 | — | — | 7 | — | — | 5 | — |
| 2017 | Von Herzen | 6 | — | — | 11 | — | — | 18 | — |
| 2019 | 20 Jahre DJ Ötzi – Party ohne Ende | 2 | — | — | 3 | — | — | 4 | — |
| 2021 | Sei du selbst – Party 2.0 | 2 | — | — | 8 | — | — | 15 | — |
| 2022 | Weihnachts-Memories | 11 | — | — | 30 | — | — | 78 | — |
| 2026 | Öha | 1 | — | — | 10 | — | — | 38 | — |

=== Singles ===
| Year | Single | Peak chart positions | | | | | | | | | | Certifications (sales thresholds) | Album |
| Year | Single | AUT | AUS | DEN | FRA | GER | IRE | NL | SWE | SWI | UK | Certifications (sales thresholds) | Album |
|---|---|---|---|---|---|---|---|---|---|---|---|---|---|
| 1999 | "Anton aus Tirol" (as Anton featuring DJ Ötzi) | 1 | — | — | — | 1 | — | 2 | — | 2 | — | IFPI AUT: 3× Platinum; BVMI: 2× Platinum | Das Album |
| 2000 | "Gemma Bier trinken" (as Anton featuring DJ Ötzi) | 12 | — | — | — | 15 | — | 55 | — | 37 | — | | Das Album |
| 2000 | "Hey Baby (Uhh, Aah)" | 4 | 1 | 2 | 1 | 11 | 1 | 65 | 3 | — | 1 | IFPI AUT: Gold; ARIA: Platinum; BVMI: Gold; BPI: Platinum | Love, Peace & Vollgas |
| 2001 | "Do Wah Diddy" | 9 | — | — | — | 29 | 14 | — | — | 75 | 9 | | Love, Peace & Vollgas |
| 2001 | "Love, Peace & Vollgas" | 43 | — | — | — | 82 | — | — | — | — | — | | Love, Peace & Vollgas |
| 2001 | "X-Mas Time" | 7 | — | — | — | 54 | — | — | — | — | 51 | | Singles only |
| 2001 | "Hey Baby" (unofficial World Cup remix) | — | — | — | — | — | — | — | — | — | 10 | | Singles only |
| 2002 | "Don't Ha Ha" (featuring Captain Jack) | 15 | — | — | — | 59 | — | — | — | — | — | | Love, Peace & Vollgas |
| 2002 | "Live Is Life (Here We Go)" (feat. Hermes House Band) | 16 | 28 | 11 | 2 | 15 | 30 | 61 | 46 | 26 | 50 | | Today Is the Day |
| 2002 | "Today Is the Day" | 19 | — | — | — | 39 | — | — | — | — | — | | Today Is the Day |
| 2003 | "Ramalamadingdong" | 37 | — | — | — | — | — | — | — | — | — | | Flying to the Sky |
| 2003 | "Burger Dance" | 3 | — | — | — | 1 | — | — | — | 7 | — | IFPI AUT: Gold; BVMI: Gold | Flying to the Sky |
| 2004 | "Not Without Us" | 10 | — | — | — | 20 | — | — | — | 97 | — | | Singles only |
| 2004 | "Tanz den Rehakles" | 43 | — | — | — | 37 | — | — | — | — | — | | Singles only |
| 2004 | "Känguru Dance" | 15 | — | — | — | 19 | — | — | — | — | — | | Singles only |
| 2005 | "Servus die Wadln / La Ola Walzer" | 27 | — | — | — | 40 | — | — | — | — | — | | Singles only |
| 2006 | "7 Sünden" (featuring Marc Pircher) | 2 | — | — | — | 30 | — | — | — | 79 | — | | Singles only |
| 2006 | "I Am the Musicman" (as DJ Ötzi Junior) | 12 | — | — | — | 24 | — | — | — | — | — | | The Musicman |
| 2007 | "Ein Stern (...der deinen Namen trägt)" (featuring Nik P.) | 1 | — | — | — | 1 | — | — | — | 2 | — | IFPI AUT: 2× Platinum; BVMI: 4× Platinum; IFPI SWI: Gold | Sternstunden |
| 2007 | "I will leb'n" | 6 | — | — | — | 7 | — | — | — | 44 | — | | Sternstunden |
| 2008 | "Noch in 100.000 Jahren" | 4 | — | — | — | 10 | — | — | — | 49 | — | | Hotel Engel |
| 2009 | "Tränen" (with Kate Hall) | 12 | — | — | — | 24 | — | — | — | — | — | | Hotel Engel |
| 2010 | "Fang das Licht" (with Karel Gott) | 31 | — | — | — | 57 | — | — | — | — | — | | Single only |
| 2010 | "Ich will mit dir fliegen" | 49 | — | — | — | 43 | — | — | — | — | — | | Du und Ich |
| 2011 | "Lieb ich dich" | — | — | — | — | 79 | — | — | — | — | — | | Du und Ich |
| 2011 | "I sing a Liad für dich" | 27 | — | — | — | 35 | — | — | — | — | — | | Der DJ aus den Bergen |
| 2011 | "Ring the Bell" | 35 | — | — | — | 48 | — | — | — | — | — | | Der DJ aus den Bergen |
| 2012 | "Du bist es" | 38 | — | — | — | 36 | — | — | — | — | — | | Es ist Zeit |
| 2013 | "Wie ein Komet" | 21 | — | — | — | 33 | — | — | — | — | — | | Es ist Zeit |
| 2013 | "Tirol" | 4 | — | — | — | 35 | — | — | — | — | — | | Es ist Zeit |
| 2016 | "Geboren um dich zu lieben" (featuring Nik P.) | 6 | — | — | — | 11 | — | — | — | 29 | — | | Von Herzen |
"—" denotes releases that did not chart.

== See also ==
- List of Austrians in music
