= Anton aus Tirol =

1999 single by Anton

Single by Anton featuring DJ Ötzi

from the album Das Album
- B-side: "Aha, aha, aha?"
- Released: 1999
- Length: 3:49
- Label: EMI
- Songwriter: Vili Petrič

DJ Ötzi singles chronology
"Anton aus Tirol" (1999)	"Gemma Bier trinken" (2000)

"Anton aus Tirol" is a song by Austrian musician Anton featuring DJ Ötzi. Written by Vili Petrič, it was first recorded by the German musical group Walter & die bunten Vögel and released as a single in 1991, but this version did not achieve success. Anton's version was released in 1999 as the lead single from the album Das Album as both musicians' debut single. The track reached number one in Anton and DJ Ötzi's native Austria, where it stayed for 10 weeks, and in Germany, where it topped the German Singles Chart for one week; it was the best-selling single of 2000 in both countries. The single also peaked at number two in Flanders, the Netherlands, and Switzerland.

== Track listing ==
1. "Anton aus Tirol" (Party mix) – 3:49
2. "Anton aus Tirol" (Extended Fun mix) – 5:48
3. "Anton aus Tirol" (Country radio mix) – 3:25
4. "Anton aus Tirol" (karaoke) – 3:54
5. "Aha, aha, aha?" – 5:14

== Charts ==
=== Weekly charts ===
Weekly chart performance for "Anton aus Tirol"
Chart (1999–2000)	Peak position
Austria (Ö3 Austria Top 40)	1
Belgium (Ultratop 50 Flanders)	2
Europe (Eurochart Hot 100)	4
Germany (GfK)	1
Netherlands (Dutch Top 40)	7
Netherlands (Single Top 100)	2
Switzerland (Schweizer Hitparade)	2

=== Year-end charts ===
Year-end chart performance for "Anton aus Tirol"
Chart (2000)	Position
Austria (Ö3 Austria Top 40)	1
Belgium (Ultratop 50 Flanders)	13
Europe (Eurochart Hot 100)	18
Germany (Media Control)	1
Netherlands (Dutch Top 40)	38
Netherlands (Single Top 100)	15
Switzerland (Schweizer Hitparade)	15

=== Decade-end charts ===
Decade-end chart performance for "Anton aus Tirol"
Chart (1990–1999)	Position
Austria (Ö3 Austria Top 40)	1

Chart (2000–2009)	Position
Netherlands (Single Top 100)	83

== Certifications ==
Certifications and sales for "Anton aus Tirol"
Region	Certification	Certified units/sales
Austria (IFPI Austria)	3× Platinum	150,000^{*}
Belgium (BRMA)	Gold	25,000^{*}
Germany (BVMI)	2× Platinum	1,000,000^{^}
Netherlands (NVPI)	Gold	50,000^{^}
Switzerland (IFPI Switzerland)	Gold	25,000^{^}
^{*} Sales figures based on certification alone.^{^} Shipments figures based on certification alone.
