= Koto =

Koto may refer to:

== People and characters ==
=== Given name ===
- Koto Abe (阿部 航斗; born 1997), Japanese footballer
- Koto Hoxhi, (1824–1895) advocate of the Albanian language
- Koto Ishiwatari (石渡こと; 1874–1947), Japanese nurse
- Koto Matsudaira (松平 康東; 1903–1994), Japanese diplomat
- Nakazawa Koto (中沢琴; 1839–1927), Japanese swordswoman and Onna-musha
- Koto Toyama (遠山向人; born 1982), assistant coach of the Ryukyu Golden Kings

=== Surname ===
- Basrizal Koto, (born 1959) businessman from Indonesia
- Bernard Koto, Malagasy politician
- Bunjiro Koto (小藤 文次郎; 1856-1935), Japanese earth scientist
- Chizuru Kotō (古藤千鶴; born 1982), Japanese volleyball player
- Joseph Koto, (1960–2021) Senegalese football manager and international player
- Nasrul Koto, (born 1965) Indonesian football manager
- Sachi Koto, (born 1951) news anchor
- Sunia Koto, (born 1980) Fijian rugby union player
- Tumi Koto, (born 1994) South African cricketer

=== Characters ===
- Dr. Kotō, a fictional character from the Japanese manga series Dr. Kotō Shinryōjo (Dr. Koto's Clinic)
- Koto (YuYu Hakusho), a fictional character from YuYu Hakusho
- Koto-furunushi (old master Koto), a character from Japanese folklore

== Places ==
- Koto, Konjic, village in Bosnia and Herzegovina
- Kotō Prefectural Natural Park, Japan
- Koto station, a railway station in Hwangch'o-rodongjagu, North Korea
- Kotō Station, a passenger railway station located in the city of Ube, Japan
- Kotō, Shiga, a town located in Echi District
- Kōtō, Tokyo, a ward of Tokyo
- Kōto islets, Taiwan
- Côteaux, Haiti (Haitian Creole: Koto)

== Languages ==
- Orejón language (also known as Koto language)
- Coixoma language (also known as Koto language)
- Okpoto language (Nupoid) (also known as Koto language)
- Okpoto language (Upper Cross River) (also known as Koto language)

== Arts, entertainment, media ==
- KOTO (FM), a National Public Radio–affiliated radio station licensed to Telluride, Colorado
- Koto (film) (Japanese: 古都, romanized: Koto, lit. 'Ancient Capital'; also known as "The Old Capital", "Ancient City"), a 1980 film directed by Kon Ichikawa
- The Old Capital (Japanese: 古都, romanized: Koto, lit. 'Ancient Capital'), a 1962 novel by Yasunari Kawabata

=== Music ===
- Koto (band), an Italian synth pop group
- Koto (instrument), a Japanese musical instrument

== Other uses ==
- Koto (kana), a ligature of two Japanese katakana
- Koto (traditional clothing), a traditional dress made by Afro-Surinamese women
- Kotō ware, a type of Japanese porcelain
- Koto Maru (1933), a steam-powered ferry
- Pterygota bequaertii, a timber species referred to by the trade name "Koto"

== See also ==
- Kodo (disambiguation)
- Coto (disambiguation)
- Codo (disambiguation)
