= Ishiwatari =

Ishiwatari (written: 石渡) is a Japanese surname. Notable people with the surname include:

- Daisuke Ishiwatari (石渡 太輔; born 1973), South African-Japanese video game developer, illustrator, musician and voice actor
- Jo Ishiwatari (石渡 譲; born 1967), Japanese actor
- Shintaro Ishiwatari (石渡伸太郎; born 1985), Japanese mixed martial artist
- Junji Ishiwatari (born 1977), Japanese musician, and former guitarist and songwriter for the Japanese rock band Supercar
- Koto Ishiwatari (1874–1947), Japanese nurse
