= Kodo =

Kodo may refer to:

== Japan ==
- Kōdō (香道), ceremonial appreciation of incense
- Nippon Kodo (日本香堂), an incense company
- Kodō (taiko group) (鼓童), a taiko drumming group
- Kodo-kai (弘道会), a yakuza criminal organization
- The imperial way (皇道), a propaganda concept related to hakkō ichiu
- Imperial Way Faction (Kōdō-ha 皇道派), a totalitarian faction within the Imperial Japanese Army
- Kumano Kodō (熊野古道), a series of pilgrimage routes

== People ==
- Kodo Nishimura (西村 宏堂), Buddhist monk and makeup artist
- Kodō Nomura (野村 胡堂), novelist and music critic
- Kōdō Sawaki (沢木 興道), Sōtō Zen teacher
- Junya Kodo (鼓童 淳也), mixed martial artist
- Kokuten Kōdō (高堂 国典), actor

== Other ==
- Paspalum scrobiculatum, a type of millet grown primarily in Nepal
- Eleusine coracana, or finger millet, grown across Africa and Asia
- Kodo, Iran, a village in Fars Province, Iran
- Odessa-Schlemeyer Field, which has the ICAO code KODO

== See also ==
- Codo (disambiguation)
- Kōdo Station (disambiguation)
- Kodos (disambiguation)
