= Kinrande =

Japanese porcelain style where gold is applied on the surface

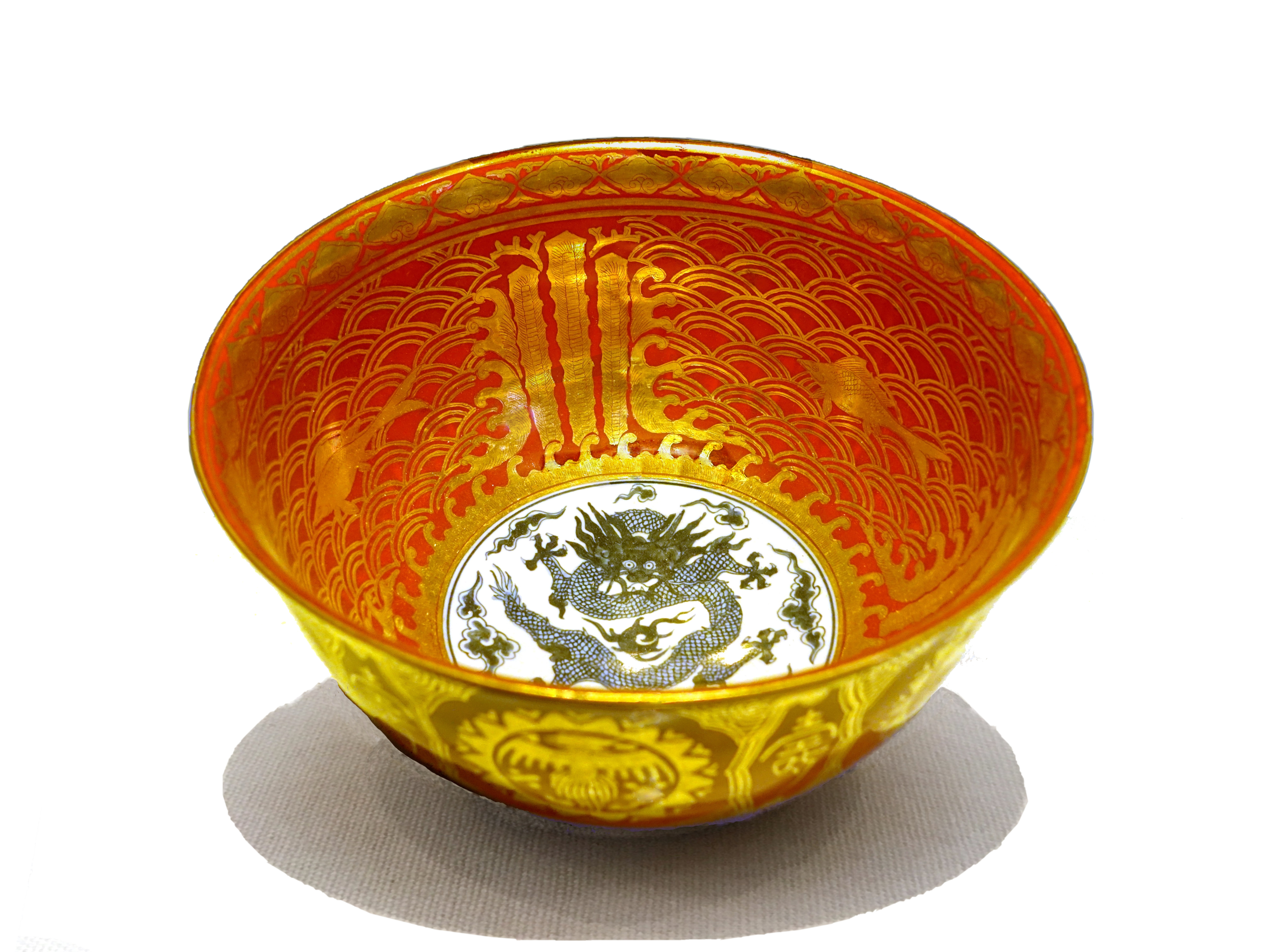
Kinrande porcelain bowl, red enamel, gilding, by Eiraku Hozen, Kyoto. Edo period, c. 1830 – c. 1850

Kinrande (金襴手; literally "gold brocade") is a Japanese porcelain style where gold is applied on the surface and there are a number of variations. It originated from China during the Jiajing (1521–1566) and Wanli (1573–1620) periods of the Ming dynasty.

In the late Edo period, Arita ware, Imari ware, Kotō ware, Kutani ware, Kyō ware and Satsuma ware had pieces in this style. Imari pieces in kinrande style were particularly popular in Baroque era Europe. King Augustus II the Strong of Poland amongst the foremost collectors.

Typically, gold was added to Chinese wucai (五彩) palette, called gosai in Japanese, which had a white base with red, green, and yellow motifs. Other types of kinrande include:

- multi-colored motifs and gold on a white base (赤絵金襴手 akae kinrande)
- red base, multi-colored motifs and gold (赤地金襴手 akaji kinrande)
- green base (緑地金襴手 ryokuji kinrande)
- yellow base (黄地金襴手 ouji kinrande)
- celadon base (白地金襴手 hakuji kinrande)
- emerald base (瑠璃地金襴手 ruriji kinrande)
- blue-and-white base (染付金襴手 sometsuke kinrande)
- tricolour base (三彩金襴手 sancai kinrande)

One of the artists specialising in kinrande was Jiro Ono (小野次郎, Ono Jiro) (1953–2010), the second son of Hakuko Ono (小野珀子, Ono Hakuko), herself a renowned artist of yūri-kinsai.
