= Yūri-kinsai =

Gold leaf-application technique used in Japanese pottery and porcelain

Yūri-kinsai (釉裏金彩) is a gold leaf-application technique used in Japanese pottery and porcelain. It forms a transparent overglaze on gilded porcelain.

Yūri-kinsai is a complicated under look technique. It uses two kinds of gold leaf that consists of one thick and one thin layer. Before firing and glazing the vessel, the leaves are cut or carved into the desired shapes and then applied to the lacquered surface. The leather is then covered in clear glaze and fired at controlled, low temperatures. This firing fuses the leaf to the surface while burning away excess lacquer. In the final stage sometimes two coats of soda glaze are applied to the surface in separate firings. Up to six individual firings are used to achieve the final result. The different thicknesses create the contrast of the pattern and with the glaze giving the vessel a visual dimension.

As well as gold, other noble metals such as silver, in yūri-ginsai (釉裏銀彩), or platinum may be used.

In 2011 it was registered by the government as an Intangible Cultural Property.

== Notable artists ==
Modern Kutani ware displays refined yūri-kinsai techniques. The Kinzangama kiln was established by the Yoshita family in Komatsu, Ishikawa Prefecture in 1906. The third generation master is Minori Yoshita (吉田美統, Yoshita Minori) (b. 1932), who was designated a Living National Treasure for his work.

Hakuko Ono (小野珀子, Ono Hakuko) (1915–1996) was a female artist from Nagoya, who lived and worked in Ureshino, Saga Prefecture. She established herself in the 1970s with porcelain works and became renowned for her yūri-kinsai works. Her son Jiro Ono (小野次郎, Ono Jiro) (1953–2010) continued the tradition, but also specialised in kinrande.

Takuro Furukawa (古川拓郎) (b. 1979), a member of the Japan Kōgei Association, works with a technique called yūri-hakkinnsai (釉裏白金彩), which uses platinum.
