= Familles jaune, noire, rose, and verte =

French terms for classifying Chinese porcelain

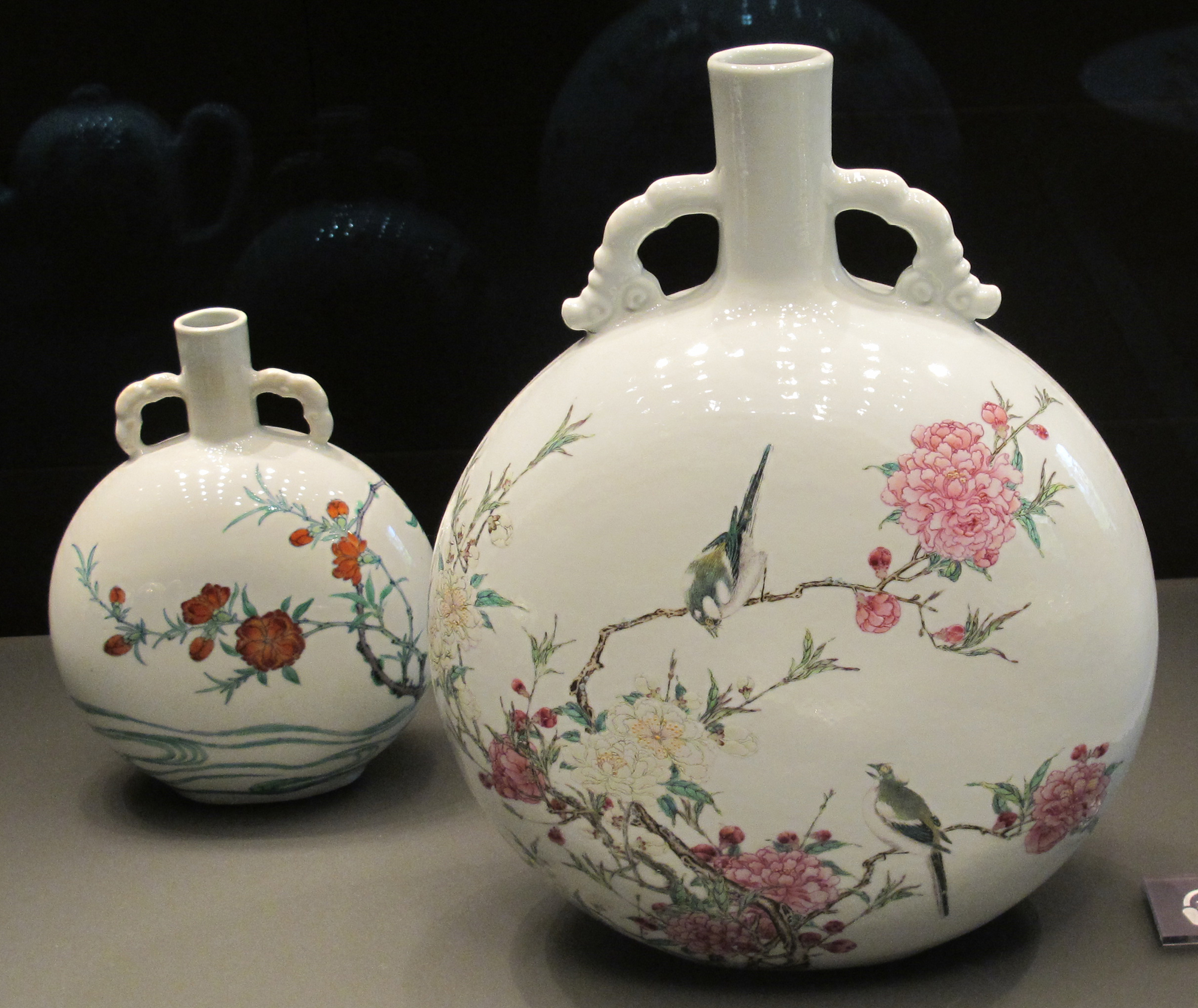
Moon flask (right) in famille rose, Jingdezhen porcelain, Yongzheng reign (1723–1735)

The familles jaune, noire, rose, and verte are a group of French terms used in the West to classify Chinese porcelain of the Qing dynasty by the dominant colour of its enamel palette. These wares were initially grouped under the French names of famille verte ("green family"), and famille rose (pink family) by Albert Jacquemart in 1862. The other terms famille jaune (yellow) and famille noire (black) may have been introduced later by dealers or collectors and they are generally considered subcategories of famille verte. Famille verte porcelain was produced mainly during the Kangxi era, while famille rose porcelain was popular in the 18th and 19th century. Much of the Chinese production was Jingdezhen porcelain, and a large proportion were made for export to the West, but some of the finest were made for the Imperial court.

== Famille verte ==
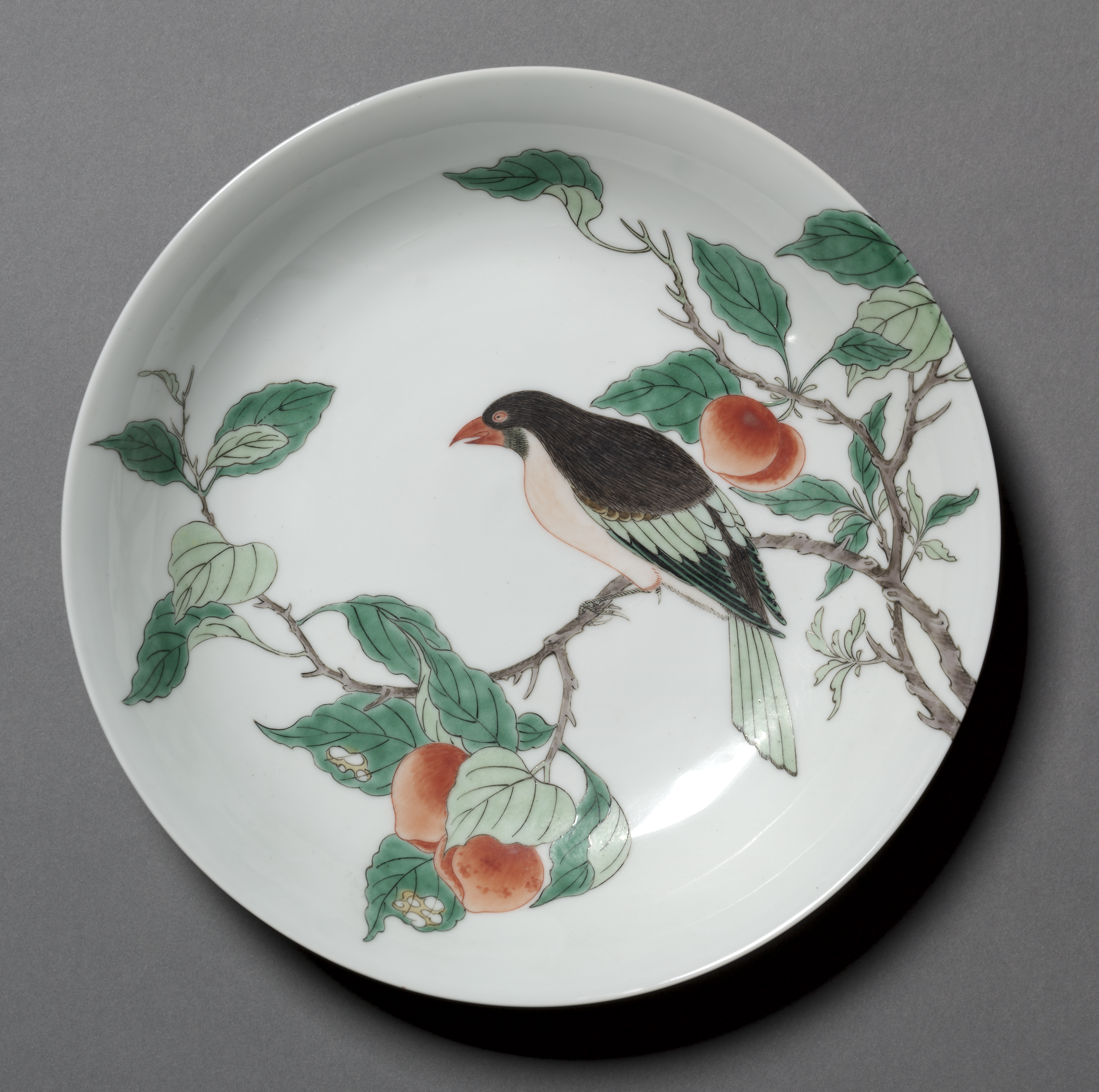
Dish with Bird on Peach Branch, famille verte, Kangxi reign, Jingdezhen porcelain

Famille verte (康熙五彩, Kangxi wucai, also 素三彩, Susancai), adopted in the Kangxi period around 1680, uses green in a few different shades and iron red with other overglaze colours. It developed from the wucai (五彩, "five colours") style, which combines underglaze cobalt blue with a few overglaze colours. The famille verte enamels may be painted on the biscuit (unglazed pre-fired ware) with no underglaze blue, or over high-fired glaze, producing wares of different appearances. Wares with enamel painted on the biscuit usually have a solid-colour ground such as yellow, black or green, while those painted over the glaze may have a white ground. Occasionally both underglaze and overglaze blue may be seen in the same object. The firing to fuse the enamels was done at a relatively low temperature.

The colours found in famille verte are typically green, red, yellow, blue and aubergine (non-vivid purple). Black may also be used and occasionally gold. The blue colour is more violet or royal blue in tone, which is different in shade from the blue used in Ming dynasty porcelain. The ability to achieve colour gradation famille verte is limited. The coloured enamels are often painted over the pure white body of the porcelain which comes over through the glaze. The colours may also be set off on black or yellow grounds (known as famille noire and famille jaune respectively), and more rarely aubergine and green.

Famille verte wares were popular for several decades until the 1720s after the reign of Kangxi when it became supplanted by famille rose which has a greater colour range. It continued to be made in small amounts in the subsequent periods, and its popularity revived in the West in the late 19th and early 20th centuries.

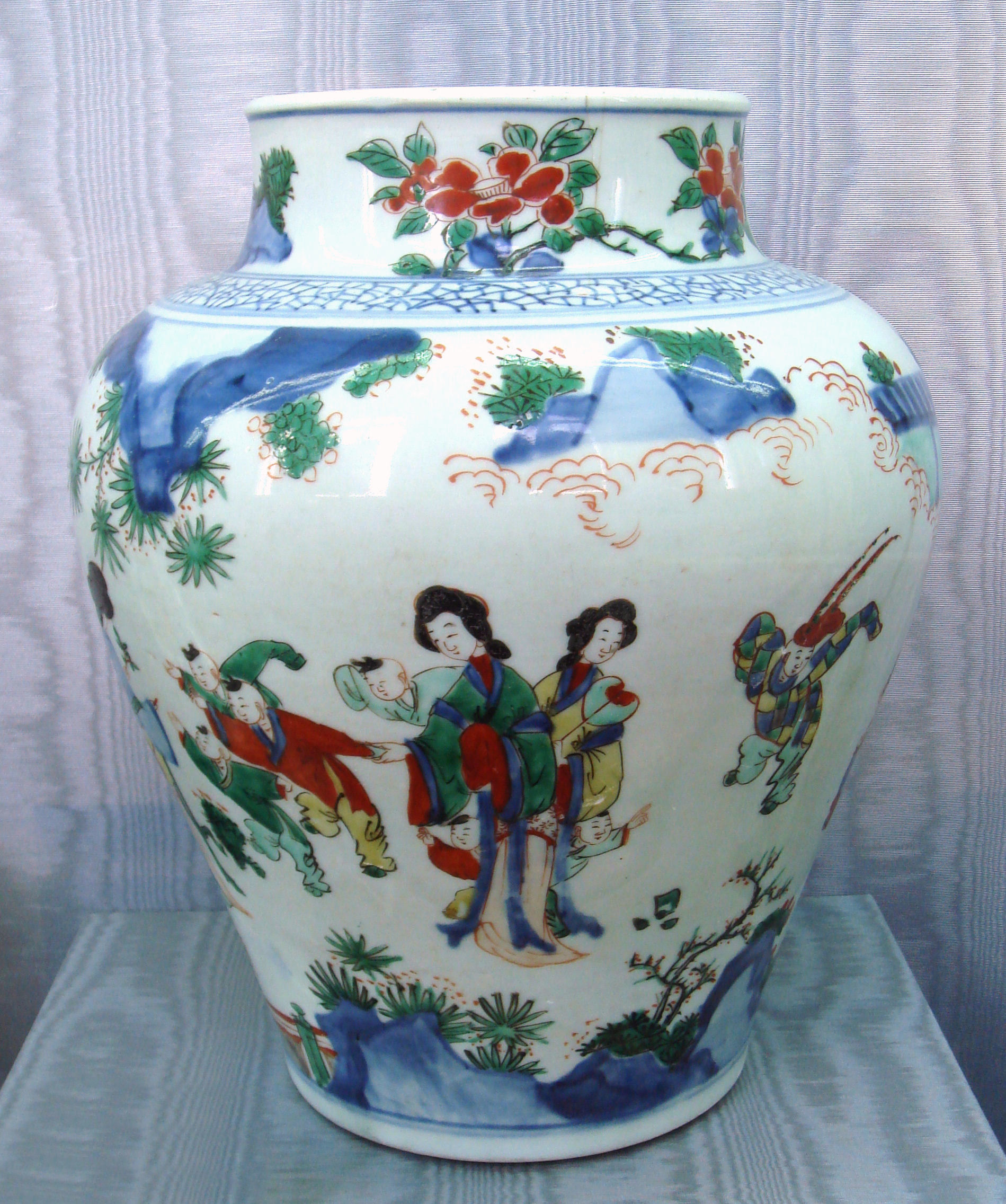
Wucai vase, Shunzhi period, circa 1650–1660

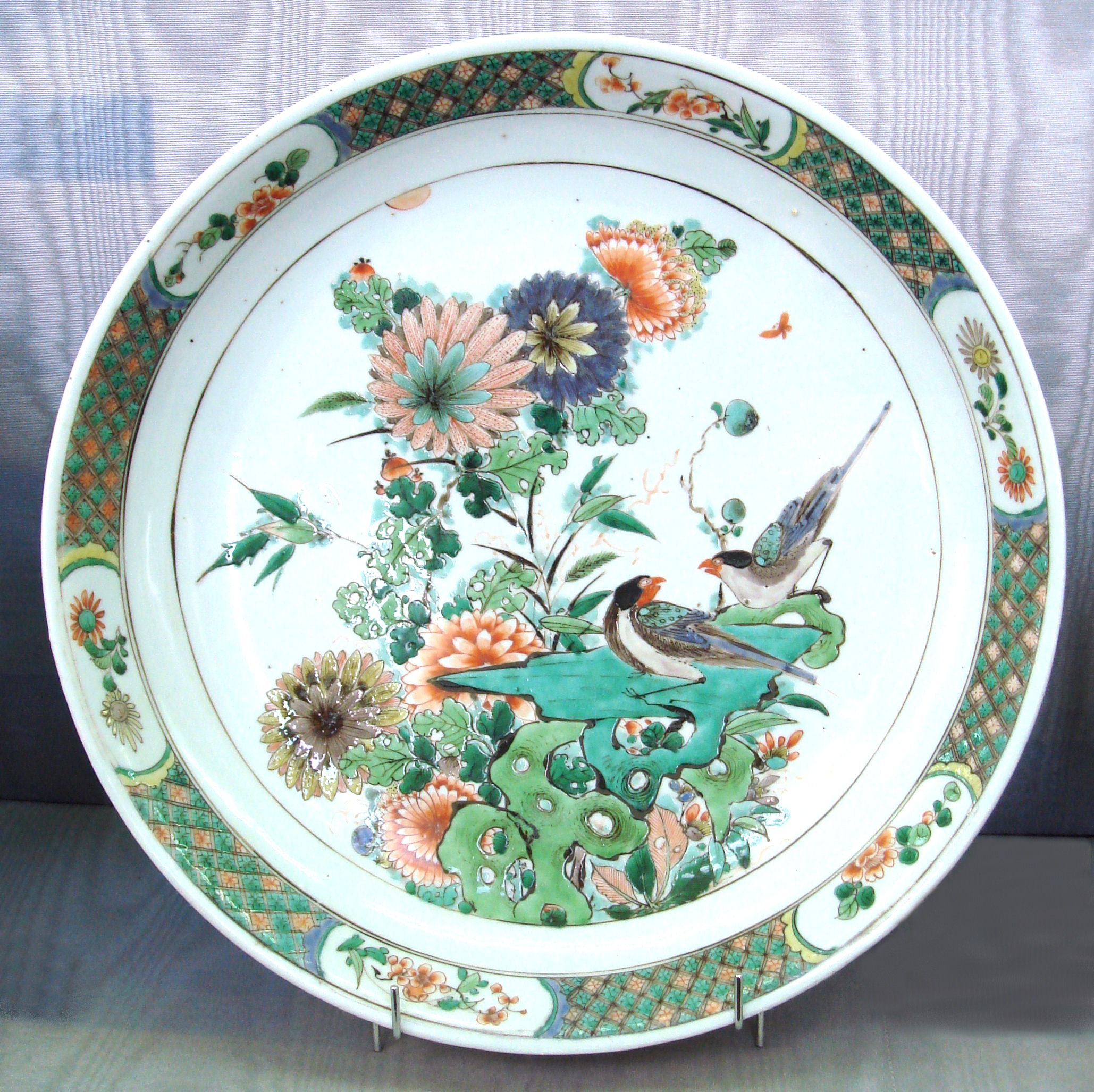
Wucai plate for exportation, Kangxi period, circa 1680

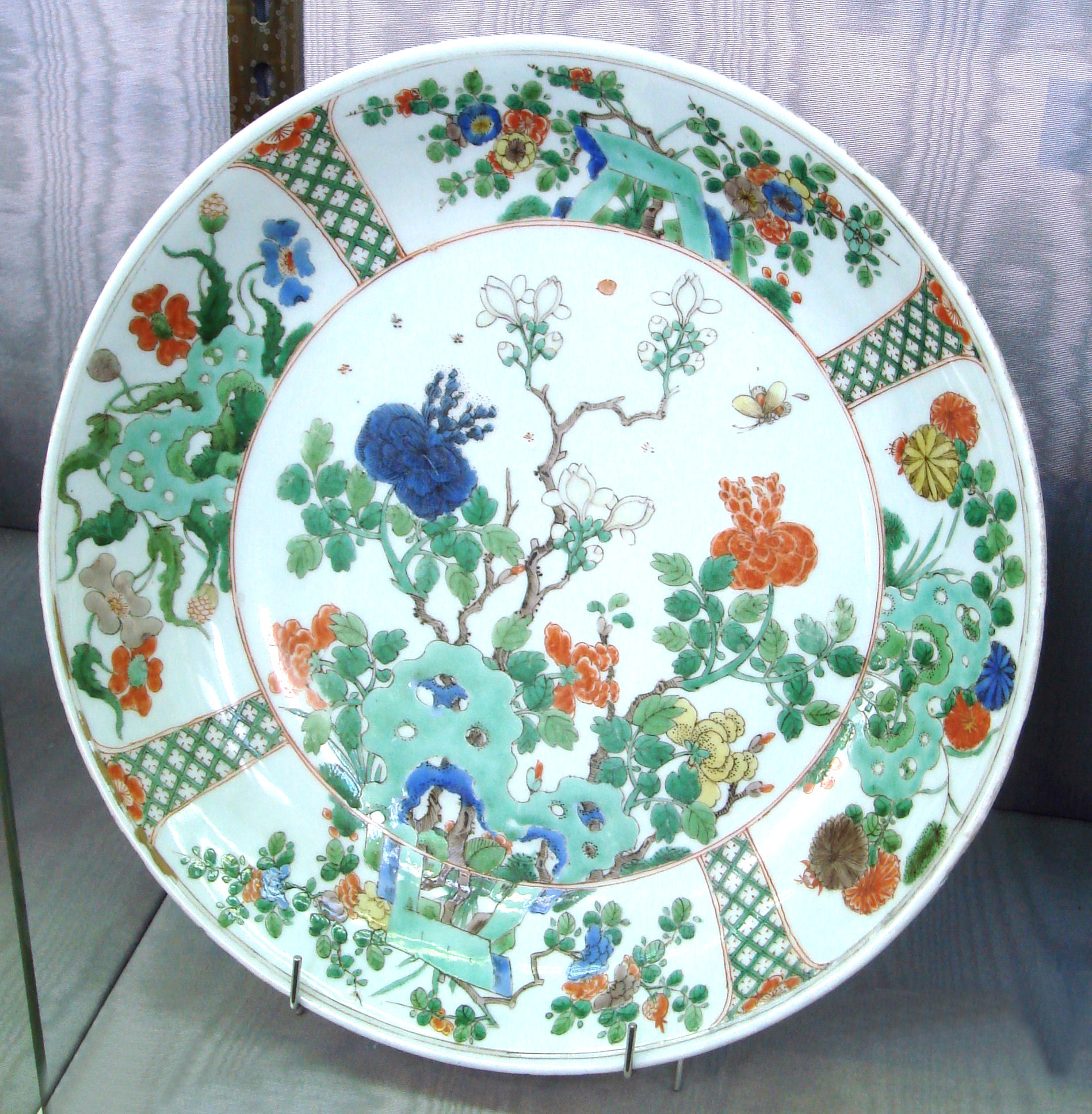
Wucai plate for exportation, Kangxi period, circa 1680

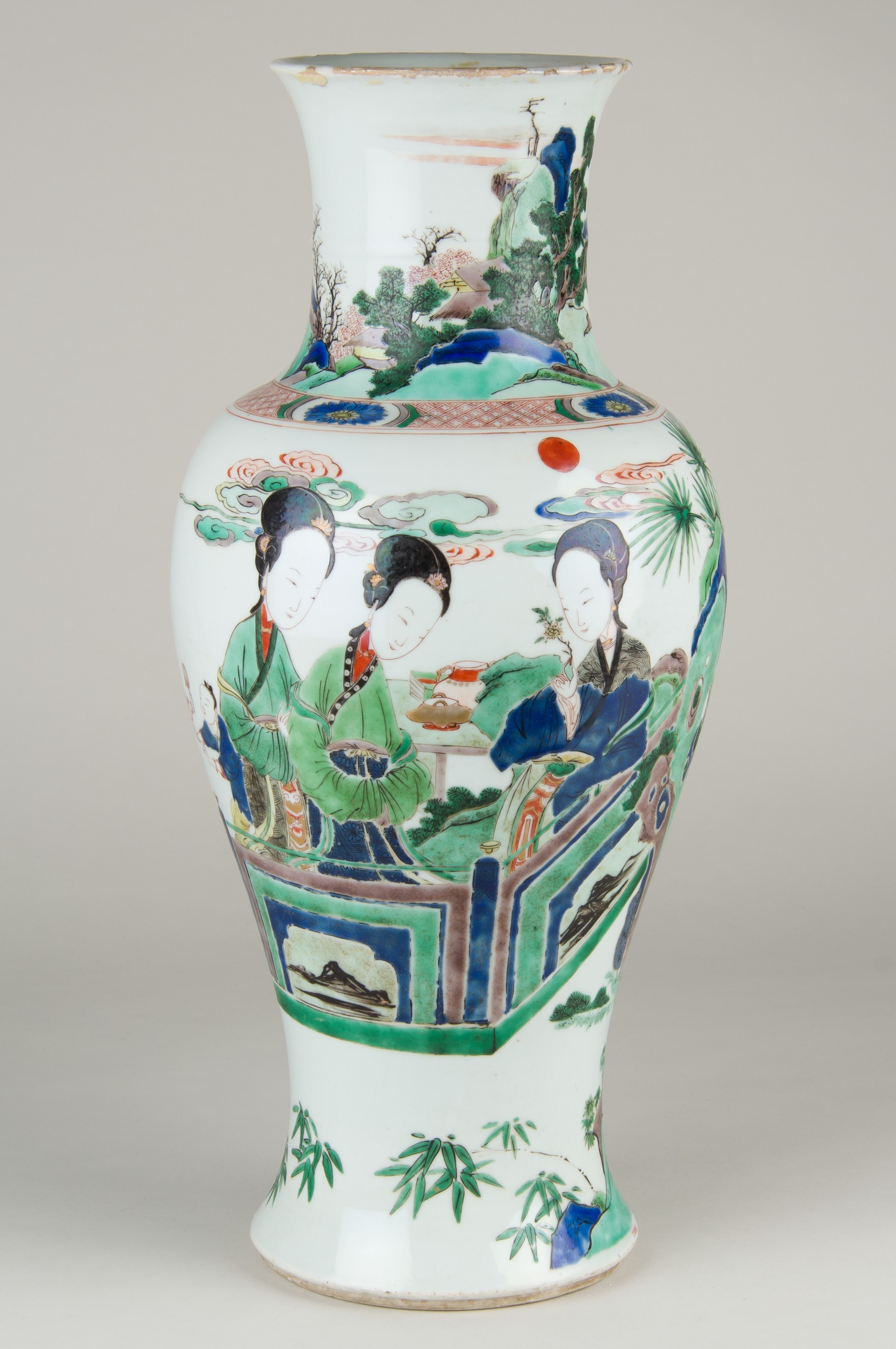
Vase, Kangxi period

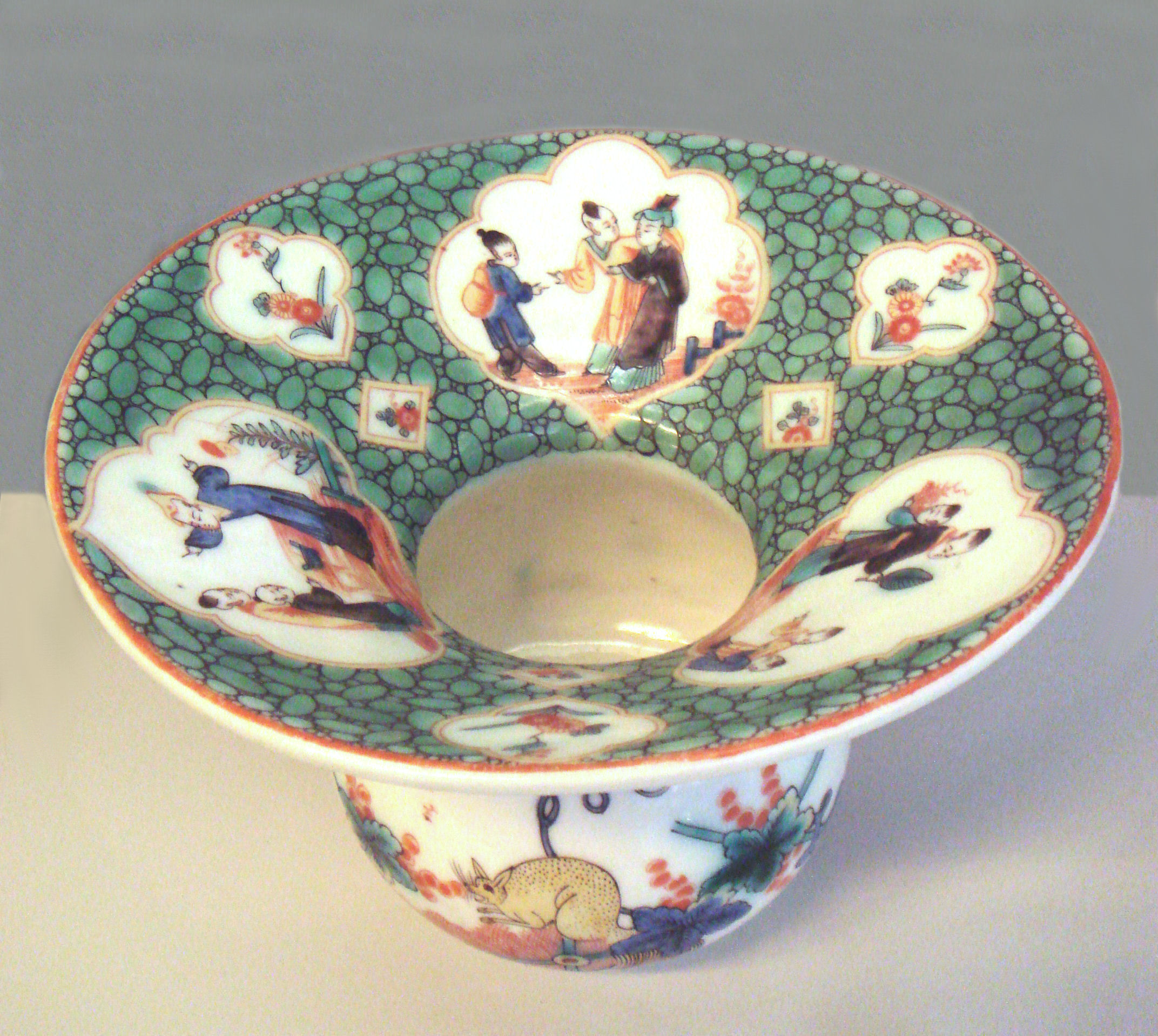
Saint-Cloud soft porcelain spitting bowl, famille verte, 1730–1740

=== Famille jaune ===
Famille jaune is a variation of famille verte, using famille verte enamels on a yellow ground.

=== Famille noire ===
Famille noire (Chinese: 墨地素三彩, Modi susancai) uses a black ground. Genuine famille noire wares were made in the Kangxi era, although some clobbered wares had the black added to famille verte porcelain in the 19th century. They may have a copper-green lead-based enamel painted over dry black cobalt ground on the biscuit, and a transparent green glaze was then applied, giving it a near-iridescent appearance. Famille noire was once highly appreciated by western collectors, which led to high prices and many pieces were then counterfeited, with the result that a large proportion of those believed to be surviving examples are actually forgeries. The popularity of this type of porcelain has since declined.

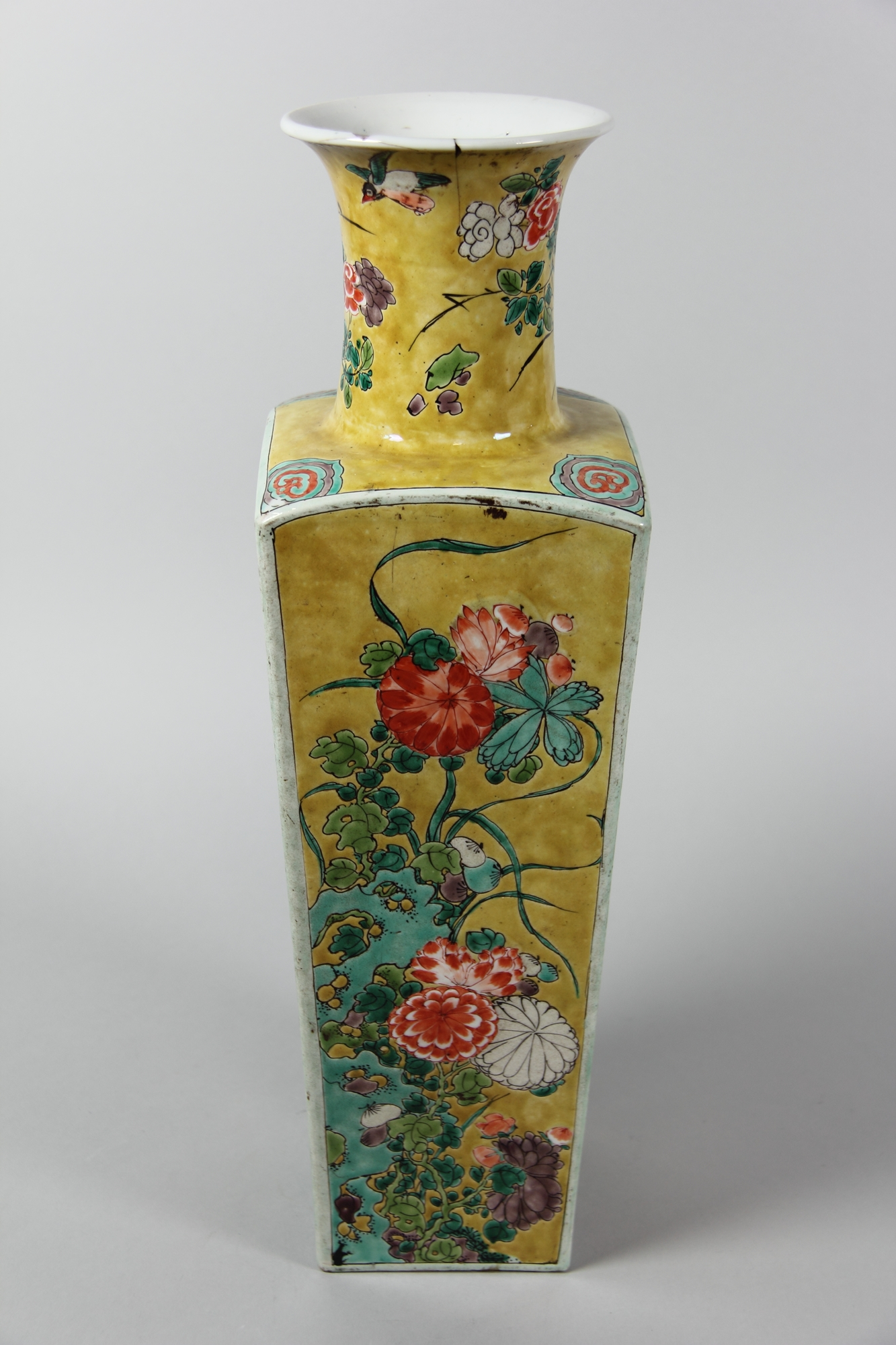
Famille jaune vase, probably Kangxi reign, Jingdezhen. Porcelain painted in polychrome enamels on the biscuit and on the glaze.

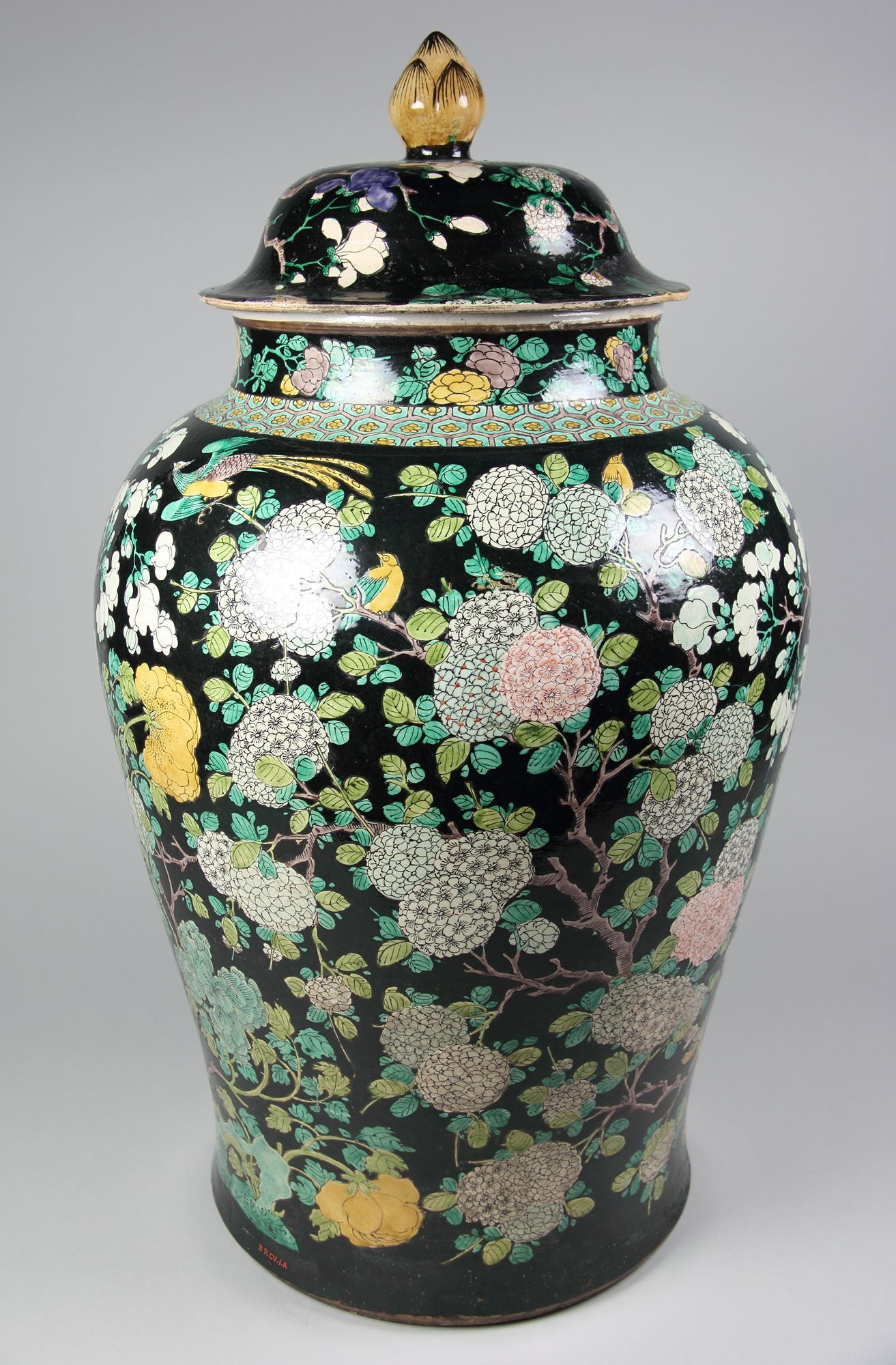
Famille noire vase, Kangxi reign, Jingdezhen

== Famille rose ==
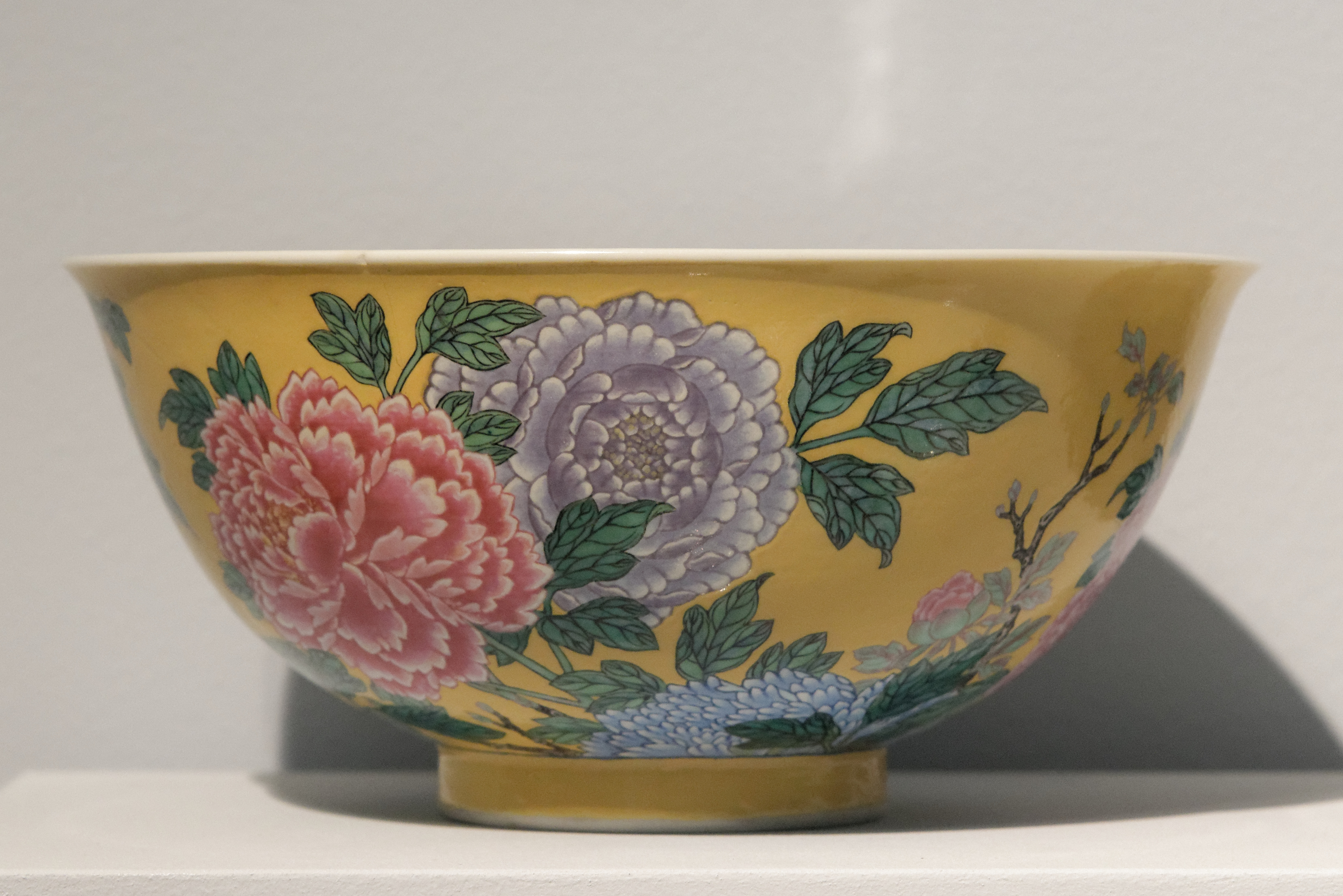
Famille rose bowl, Imperial porcelain, Jingdezhen

Famille rose, known in Chinese as fencai (粉彩) or ruancai (軟彩 / 软彩), lit. 'pale colours' or 'soft colours'), yangcai (洋彩), lit. 'foreign colours'), and falangcai (珐琅彩, lit. 'enamel colours'), is a type of porcelain defined by the presence of pink colour overglaze enamel. The colour palette was introduced in China during the reign of Kangxi (1654–1722), possibly around 1720, but perfected only in the Yongzheng era when the finest pieces were made. Famille rose is named after its pink-coloured enamel, although it ranged from pale pink to deep ruby. Apart from pink, a range of other soft colour palettes were used in famille rose, hence the term fencai. The gradation of colours was produced by mixing coloured enamels with 'glassy white' (玻璃白, boli bai), an opaque white enamel (lead arsenate).

It is generally believed that the new colour palette in China was introduced by Jesuits in China (through the use of purple of Cassius) to the Imperial court, initially on enamels used on metal wares such as cloisonné produced in the falang workshop (珐琅作, falang meaning enamel may have originated from the word for the "Franks" or "France"), or through adaptation of enamels used in tin-glazed South German earthenware. Research has failed to show that the chemical composition of the pink colour pigment on famille rose to be the same as that of the European one. However, the term used by Tang Ying (who oversaw the production of porcelain at Jingdezhen) and in Qing documents was yangcai ("foreign colours"), indicating its foreign origin or influence. Rudimentary famille rose have been found in Chinese porcelain from the 1720s, although the technique was not fully developed until around 1730 during the Yongzheng period. The pink of the early pieces of the 1720s were darker in colours made with ruby-coloured glass, but after 1725 softer shades were achieved by mixing with white enamels. At the Palace workshops in Beijing, experimentation was conducted to develop a range of enamel colours and techniques for applying the such enamels onto blank porcelain supplied by Jingdezhen, and the wares produced were called falangcai. Court painters were employed to make drafts to decorate such wares, which produced a new aesthetic style of decoration on porcelain. Falangcai decorations may be painted on a white ground, or on a coloured ground with yellow being the most popular. As falangcai was produced at the palace for its exclusive use, there are relatively fewer pieces of falangcai porcelain.

With the successful creation of falangcai porcelain at the palace, falangcai was also then made at the imperial kilns of Jingdezhen. The term yangcai was used to refer to porcelain produced at Jingdezhen to imitate falangcai. Visually there is little difference in appearance between falangcai and yangcai wares produced for imperial use, but differences may be detected in the chemical composition of the flux used. Ruancai ('soft colours') was also a term used in the Yongzheng era as the colours used are softer in contrast to the 'hard colours' (硬彩, yingcai) previously used for famille verte or wucai. Fencai is the more modern term used by Chen Liu (陈浏) in the early 20th century and it then replaced yangcai in Chinese usage.

The famille rose enamels allow for a greater range of colour and tone than was previously possible, enabling the depiction of more complex images, particularly during the Qianlong era, and decorations became more elaborate and crowded in the later Qianlong period. The images may be painted on coloured grounds, including yellow, blue, pink, coral red, light green, 'cafe au lait' and brown. Black ground or famille noire may also be used on famille rose ware, but they are not highly regarded. Many produced in the Qianlong period were on eggshell porcelain. Famille rose supplanted famille verte in popularity, and its production overtook blue and white porcelain in the mid-18th century. It remained popular throughout the 18th and 19th centuries and continued to be made in the 20th century. The quality of wares produced however declined after the Qianlong period.

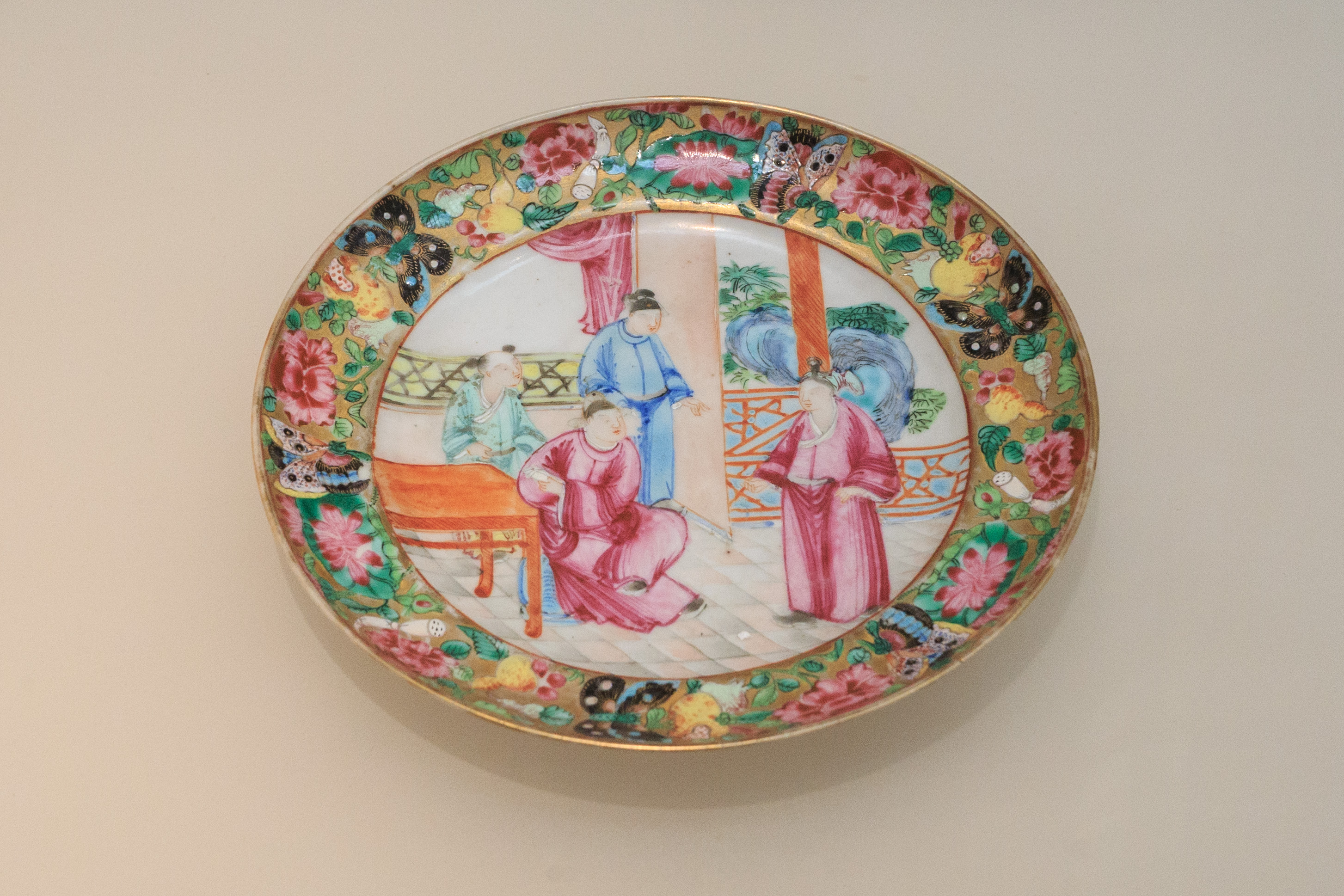
Famille rose Canton ware with Rose Mandarin decoration

Jingdezhen produced many famille rose pieces, and some of the finest pieces were made there. However, from the late 18th century onwards, many pieces were decorated in the port city of Canton to produce the Canton ware intended for export, using white porcelain from Jingdezhen. In contrast to the more refined 'court-taste' porcelain, export wares particularly those from the 19th century tend to be highly and brightly decorated. The decorative patterns used in these export wares may be referred to as Rose Canton, Rose Mandarin and Rose Medallion.

Famille rose enamels were known to have been used in Europe before its usage became established in China, for example in Vienna porcelain made by the Du Paquier factory in 1725. Large number of famille rose porcelains were exported from China to the West, and many European factories such as Meissen, Chelsea and Chantilly copied the famille rose palette used in Chinese porcelain. Export of Chinese porcelain then declined due to competition from the European factories.

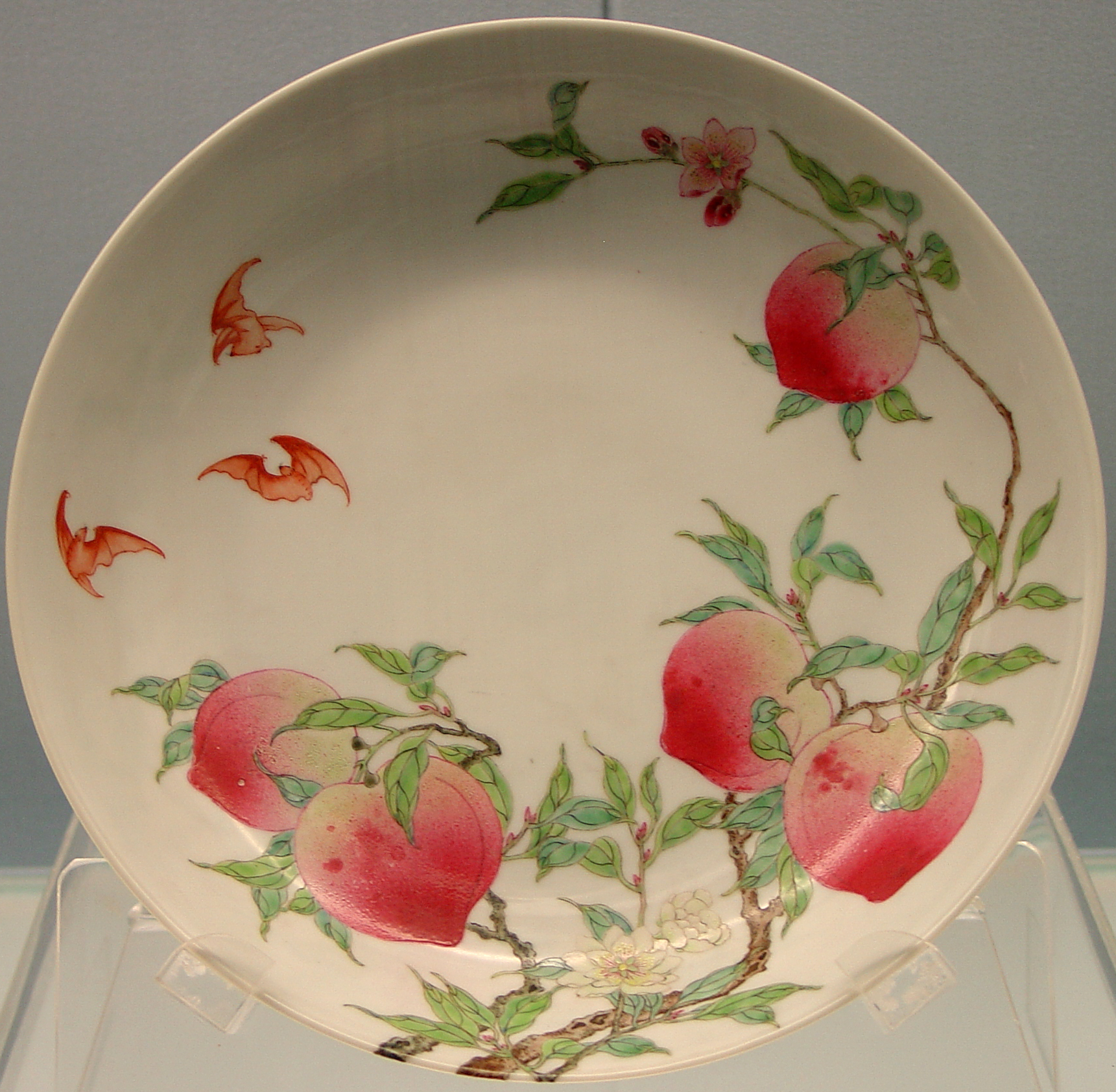
Auspicious bats and peaches on a dish, a popular subject in the Chinese taste. Yongzheng reign (1723–1735)

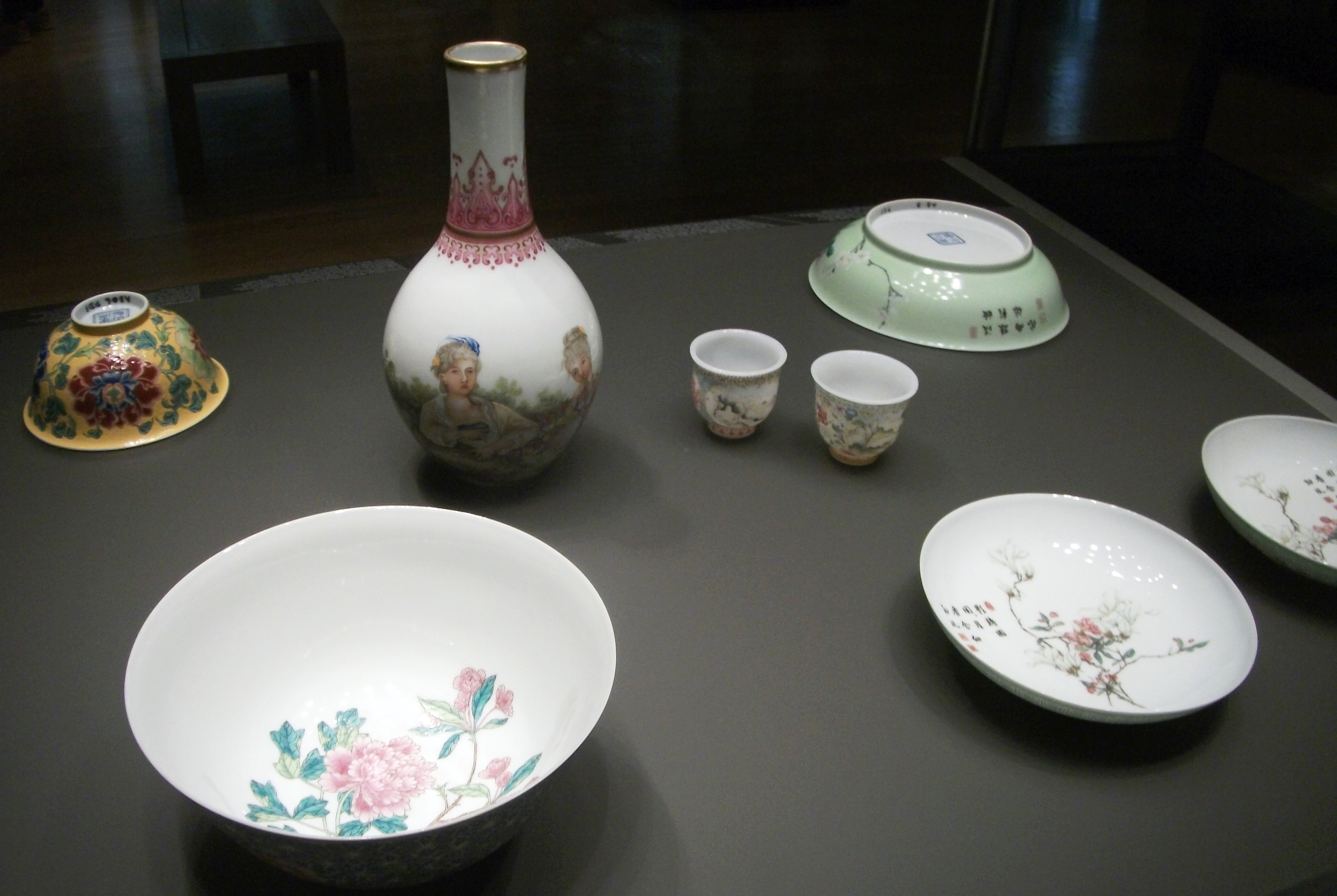
A selection of falangcai porcelains

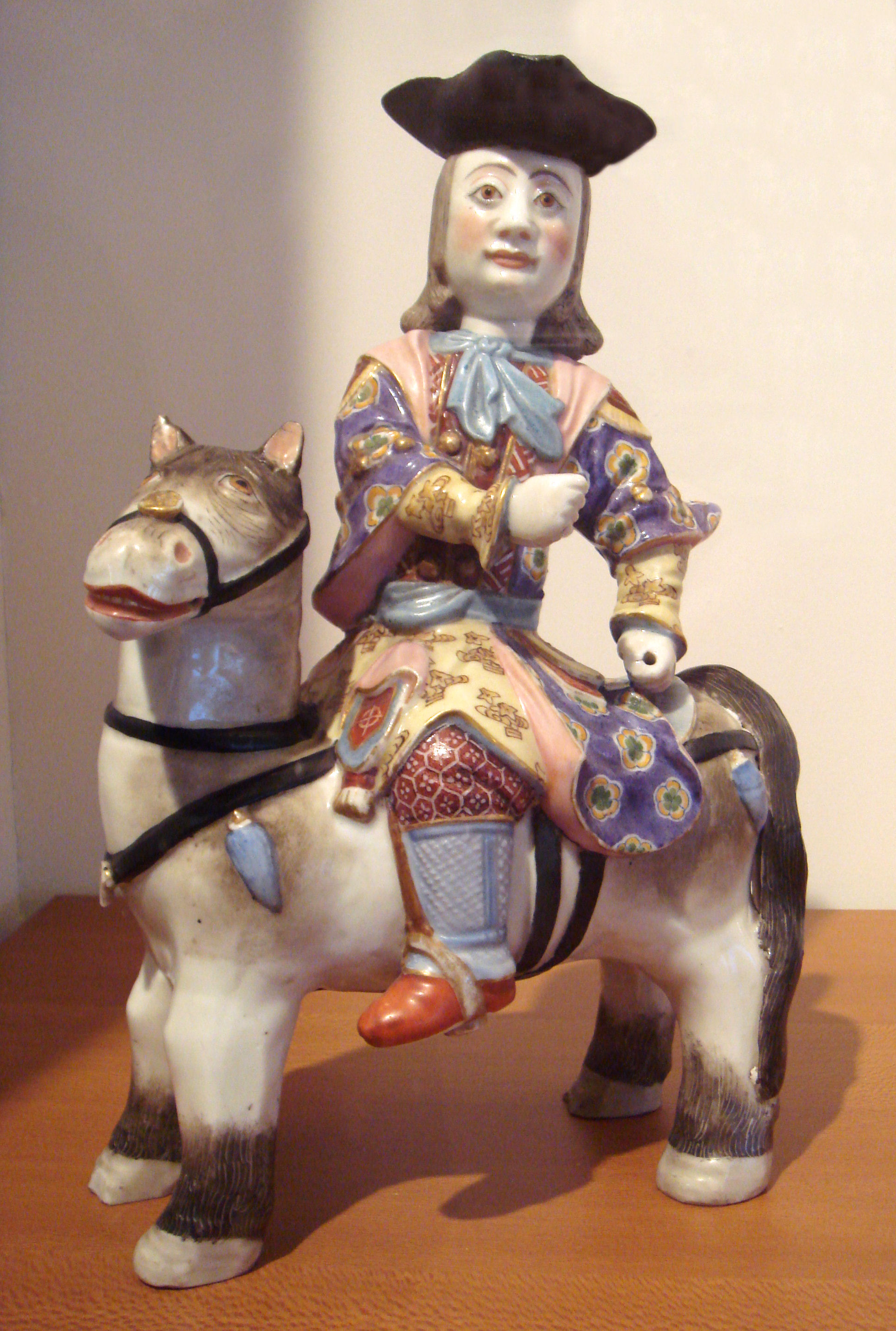
Qing period Chinese export porcelain with European figure, famille rose, first half of 18th century

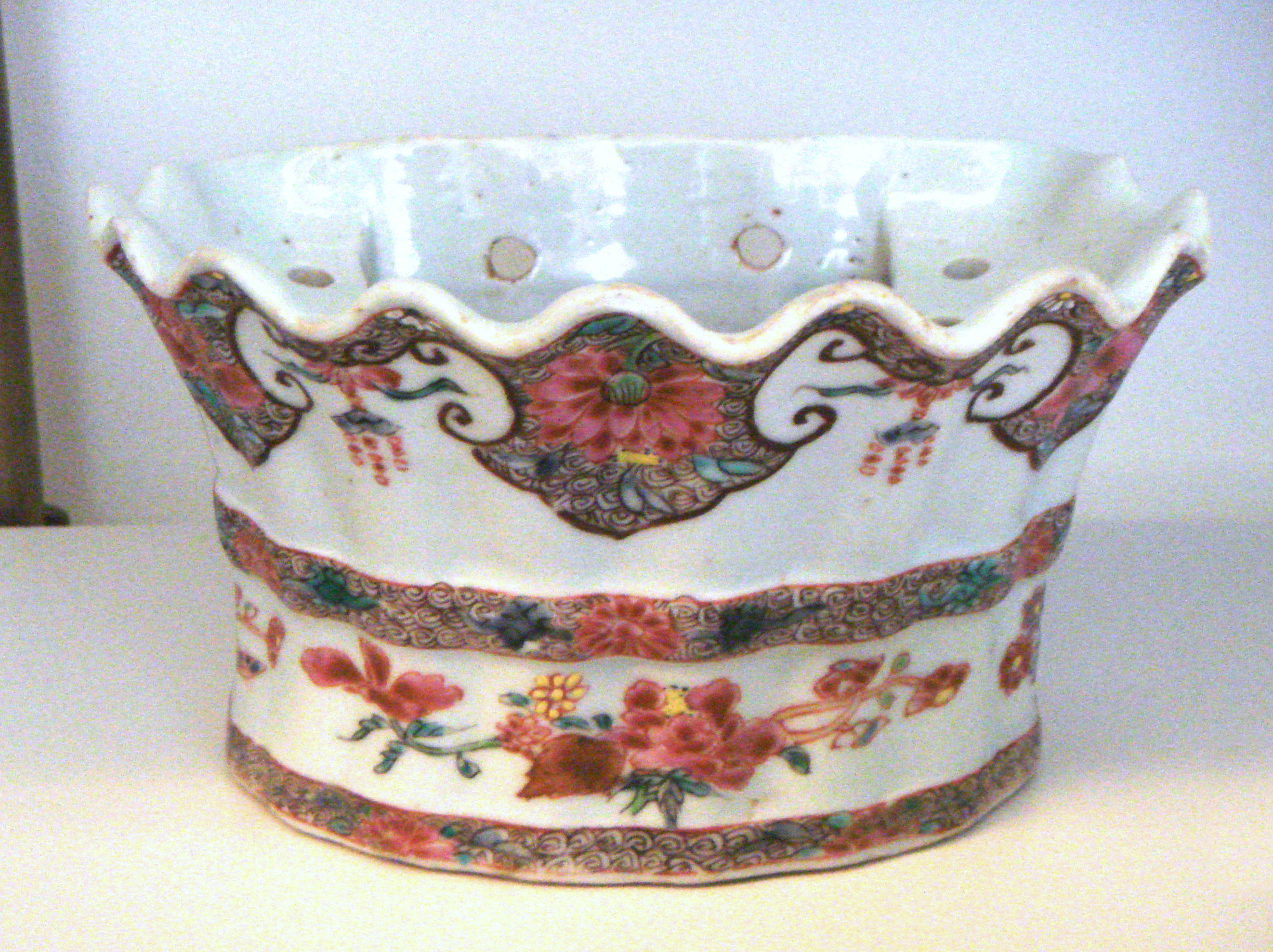
Jingdezhen porcelain soft paste porcelain flower holder, famille rose, 1736–1796, Qianlong period

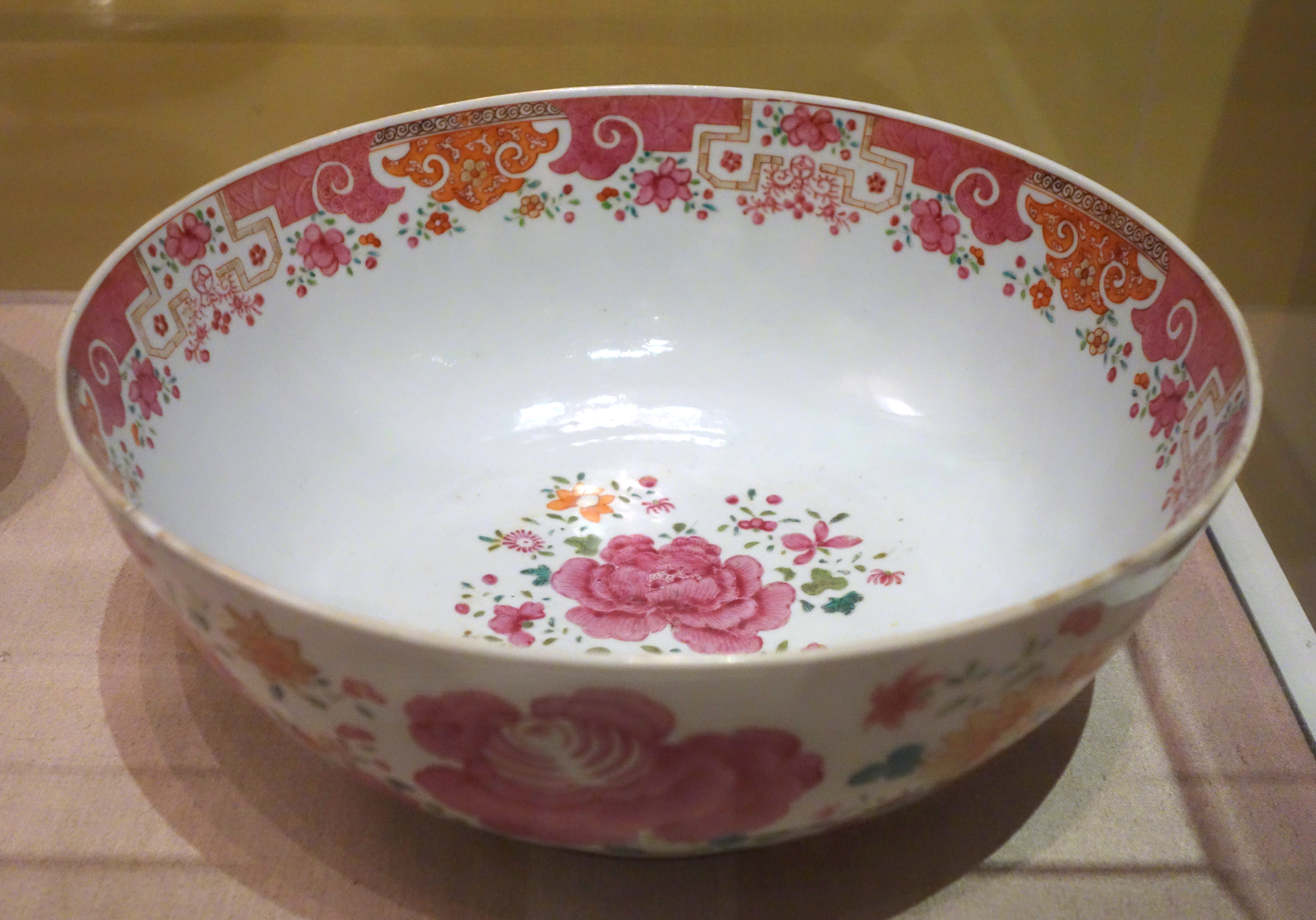
Canton ware

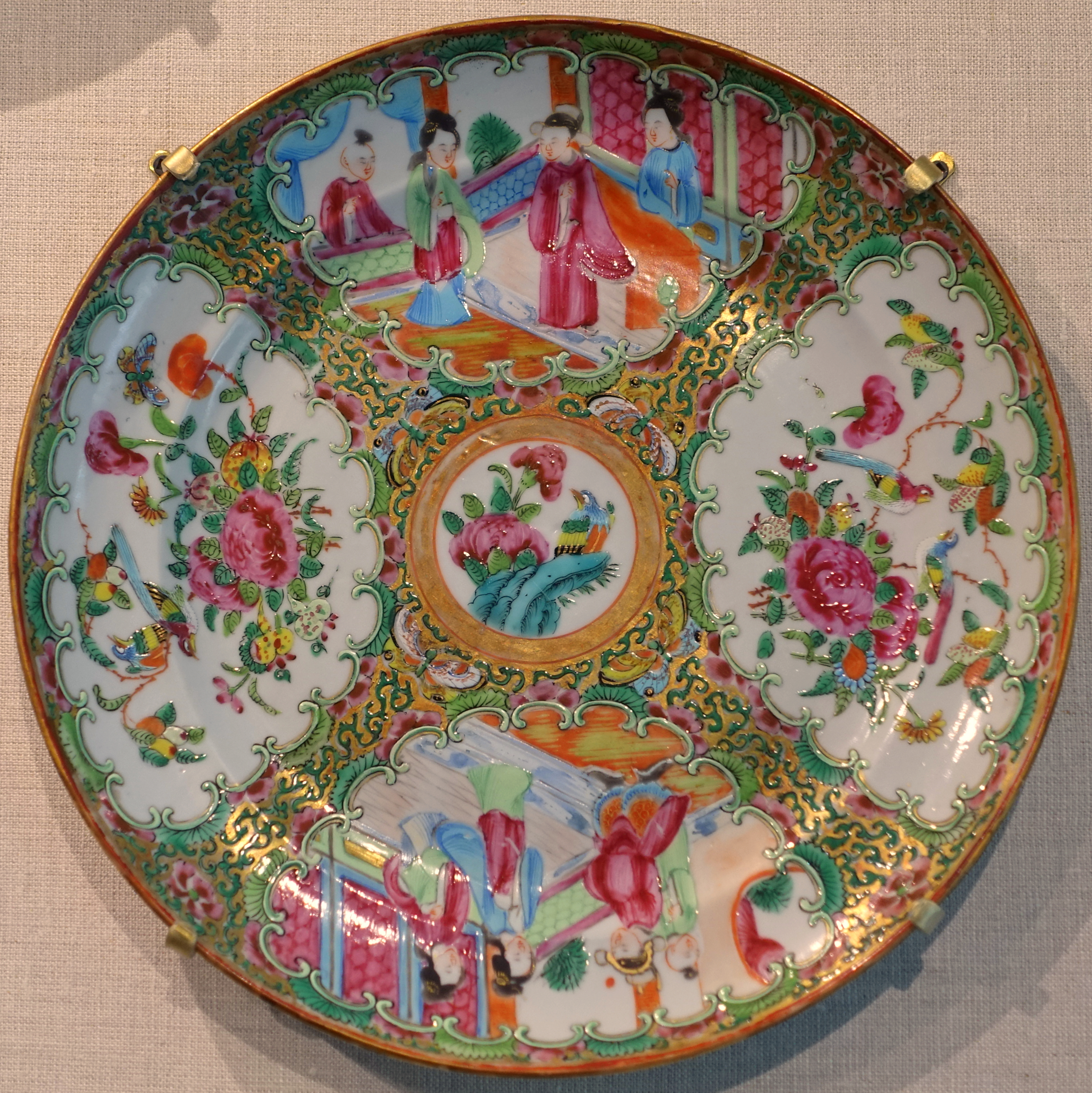
Rose Medallion plate with decorations that are divided into panels

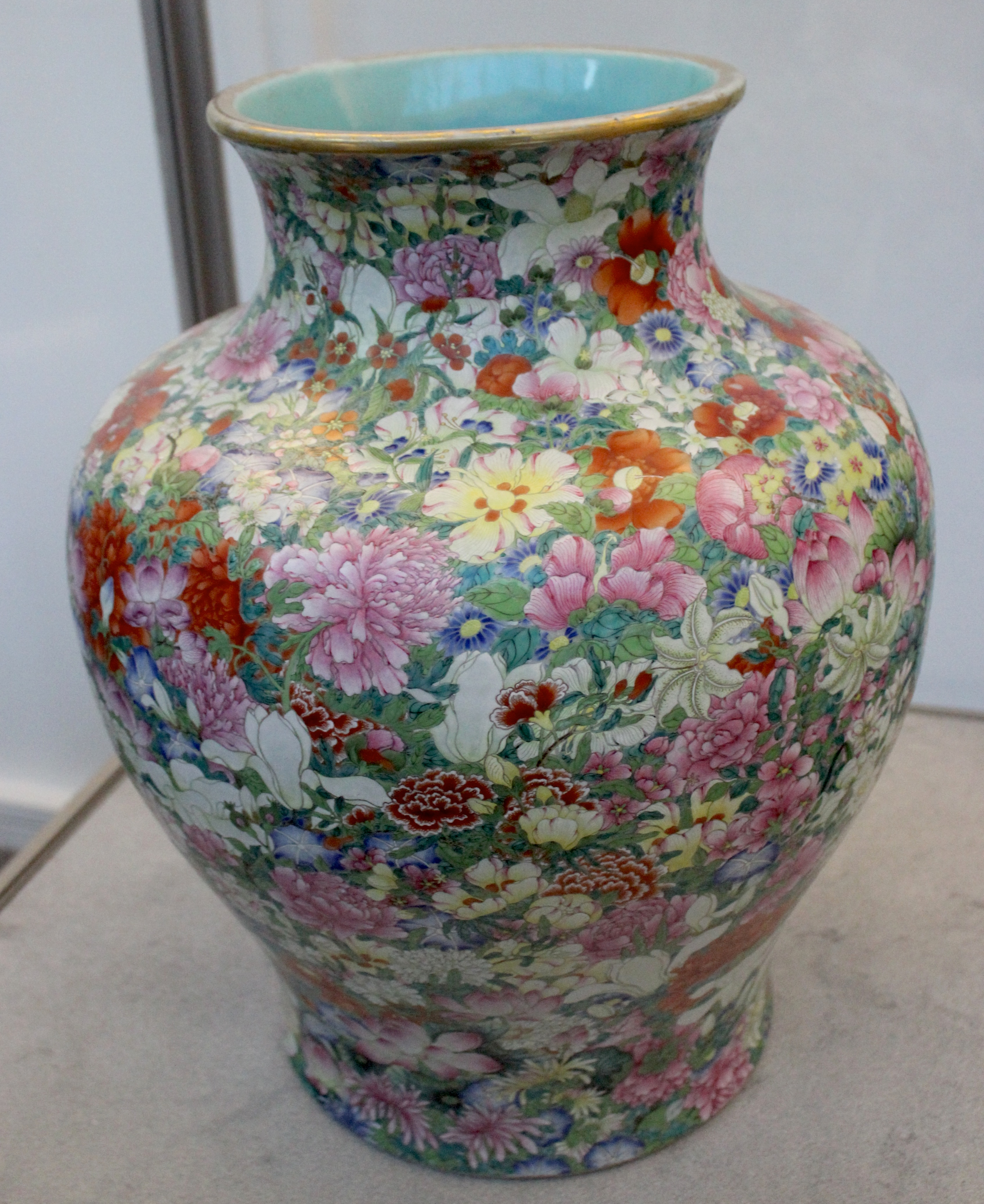
Qianlong period famille rose vase

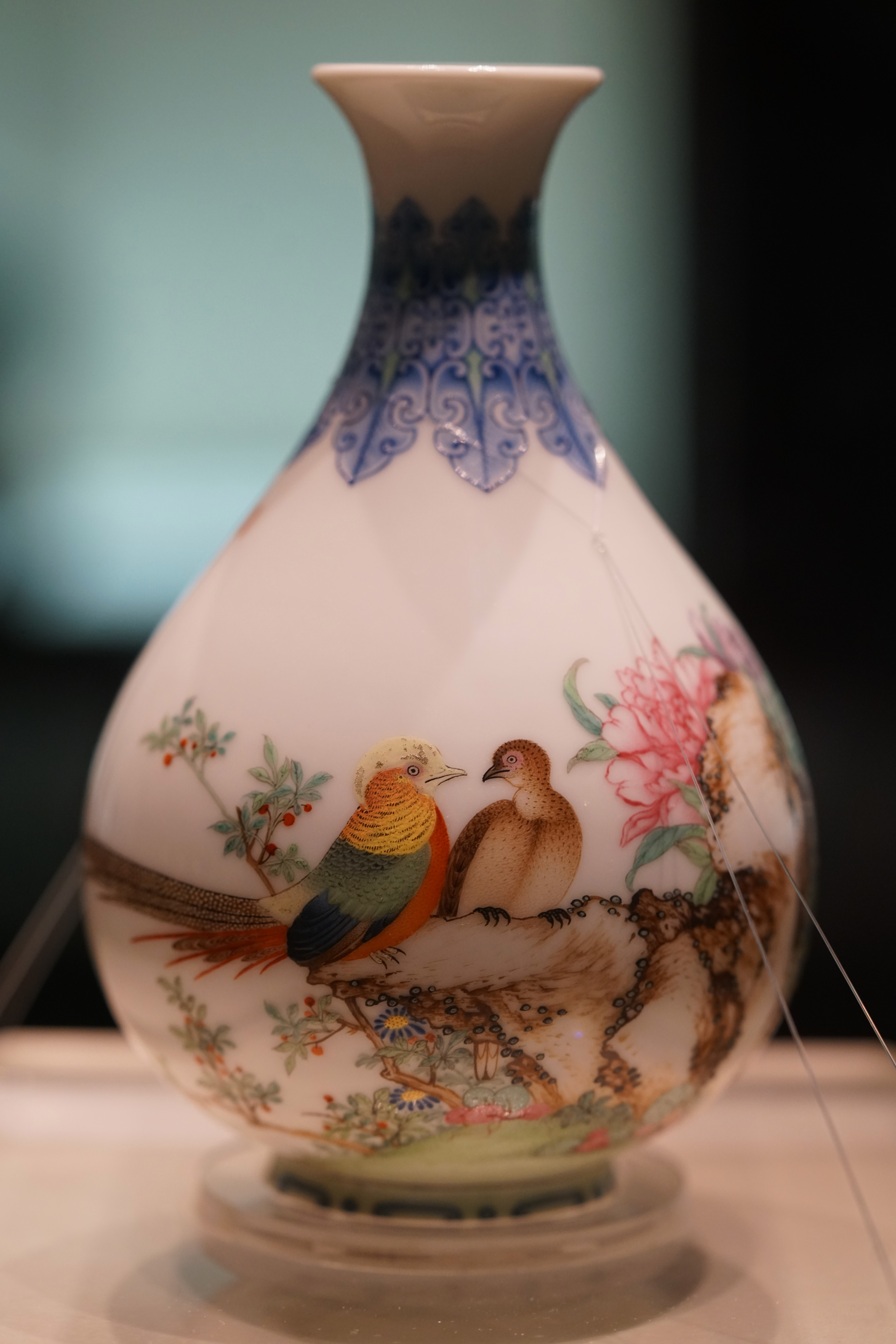
Falangcai vase

European pieces in the styles

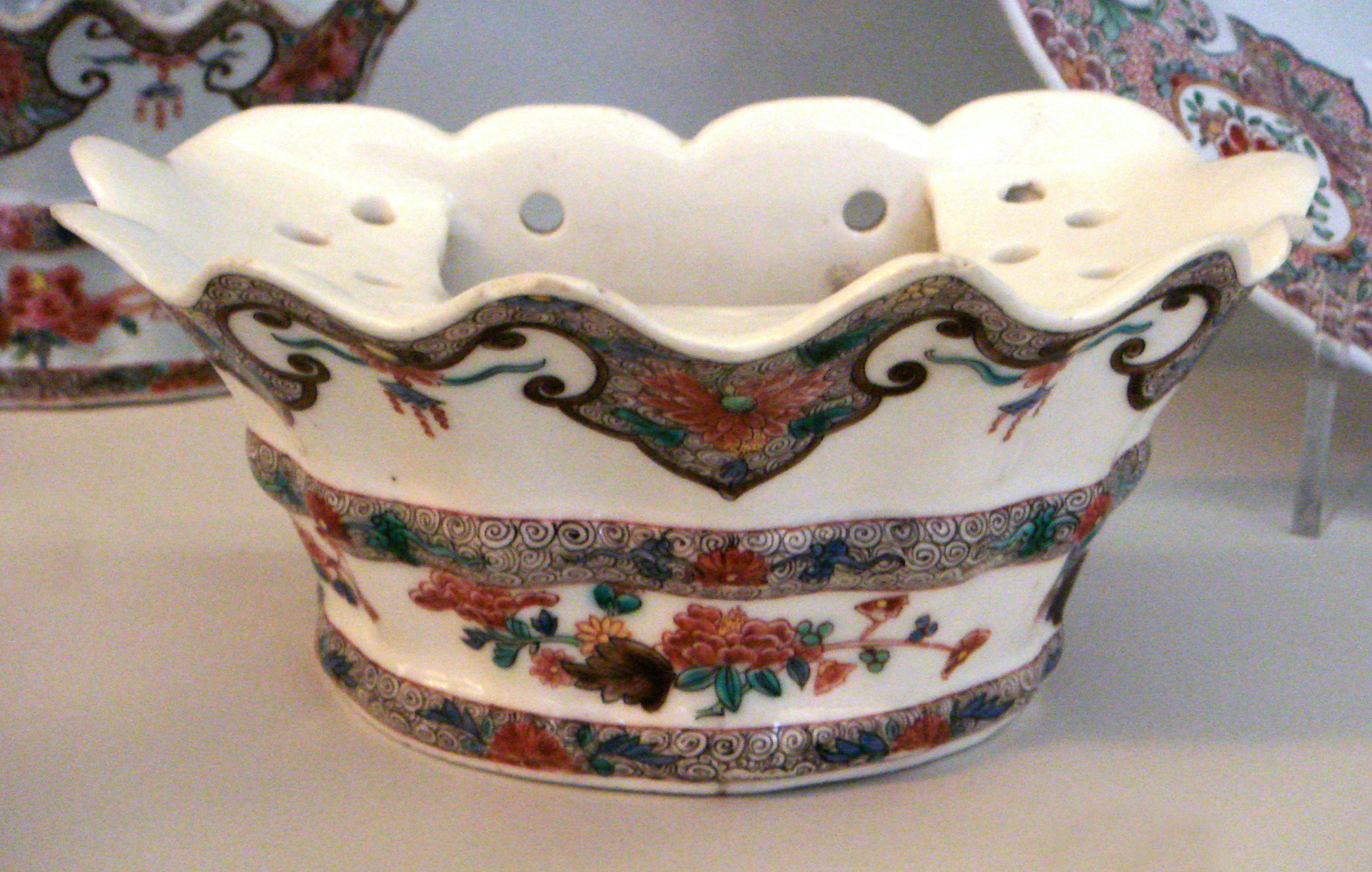
Saint-Cloud soft paste porcelain flower holder, famille rose, 1730–1740

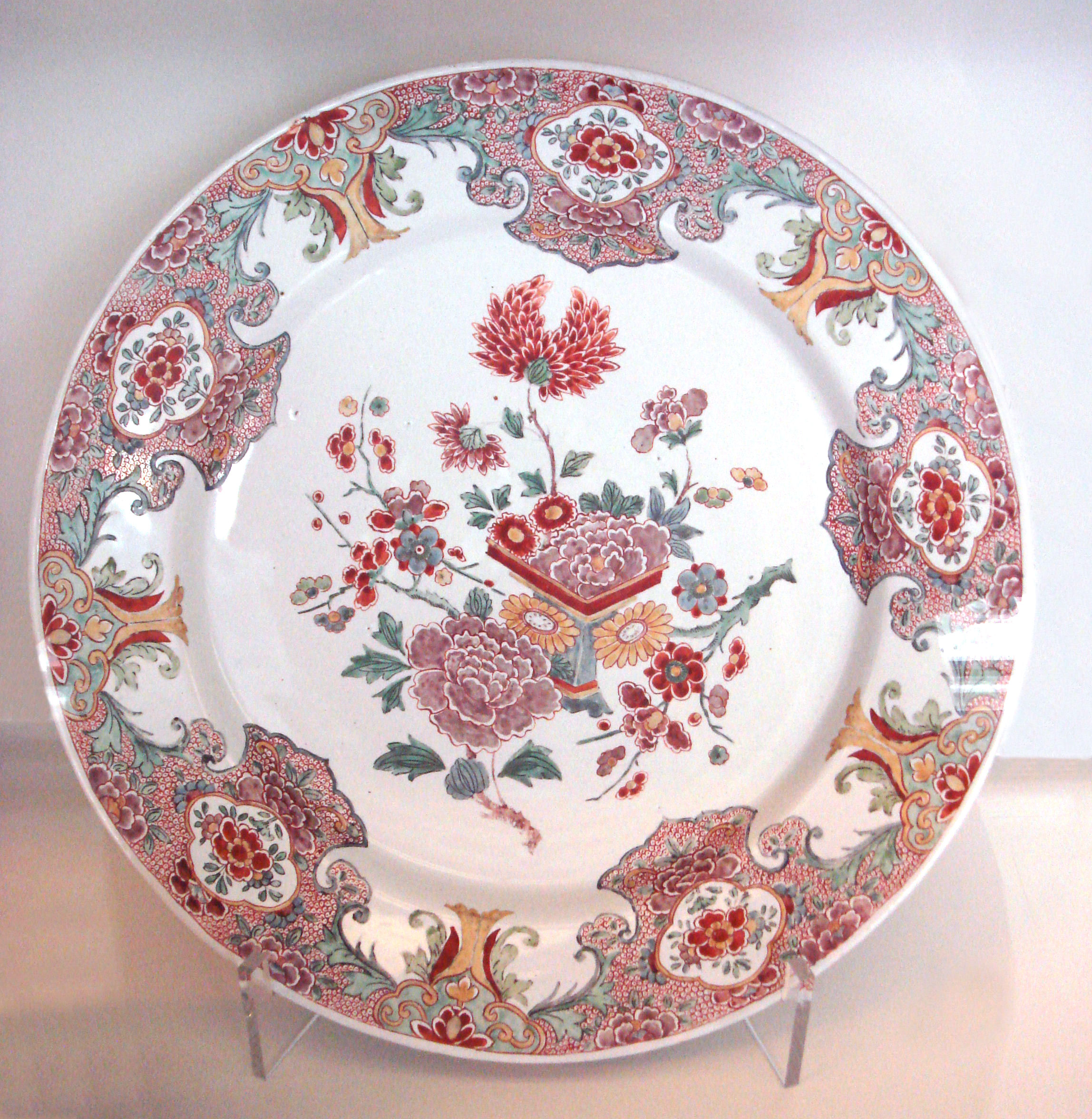
Dutch Delftware plate, faience, famille rose, 1760–1780
