= Kodos =

Kodos may refer to:

- Kodos the Executioner, a character from the Star Trek episode "The Conscience of the King"
- Kodos of Kang and Kodos, a character from The Simpsons
- Warlord Kodos, a character from the Sonic the Hedgehog comic book

== See also ==
- Kodo (disambiguation)
- Koedoes Residency, administrative division of Central Java province
- Codos, Aragon, Spanish municipality
- Codos or Commandos, guerrilla groups active in southern Chad 1983–1986
