= Wucai =

Style of Chinese porcelain decoration

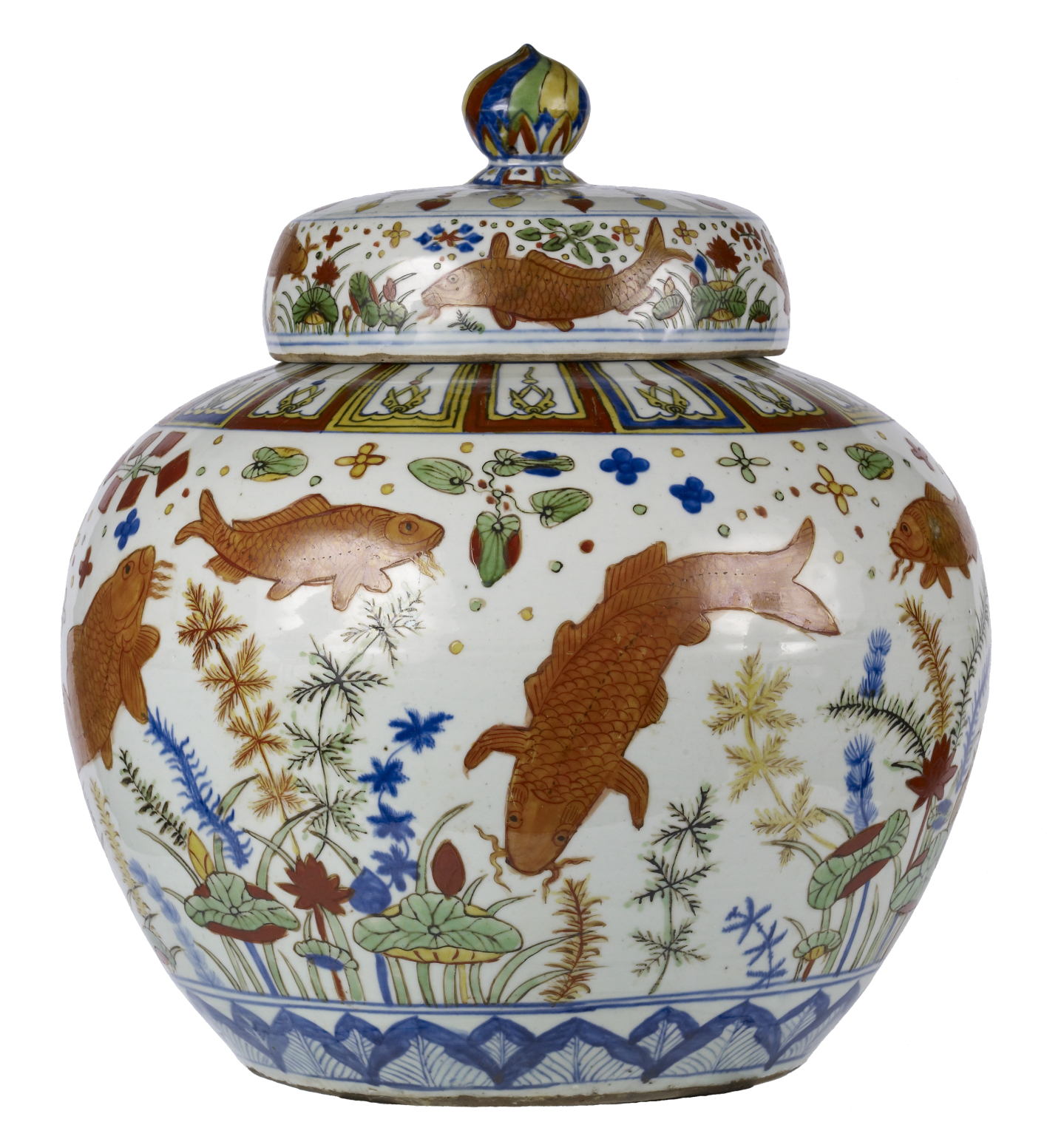
Wucai Goldfish Vase from the Jiajing period (1521–67) of the Ming dynasty

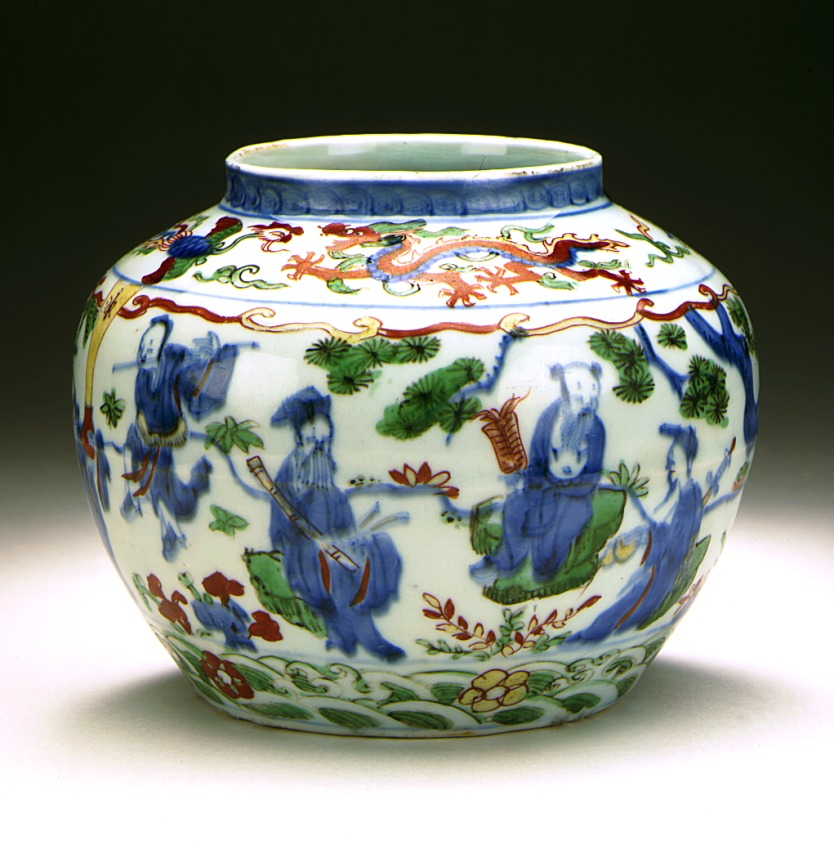
Wucai jar with the Eight Immortals, Wanli reign, 1573–1620

Wucai (五彩, "Five colours", "Wuts'ai" in Wade-Giles) is a style of decorating white Chinese porcelain in a limited range of colours. It normally uses underglaze cobalt blue for the design outline and some parts of the images, and overglaze enamels in red, green, and yellow for the rest of the designs. Parts of the design, and some outlines of the rest, are painted in underglaze blue, and the piece is then glazed and fired. The rest of the design is then added in the overglaze enamels of different colours and the piece fired again at a lower temperature of about 850°C to 900°C.

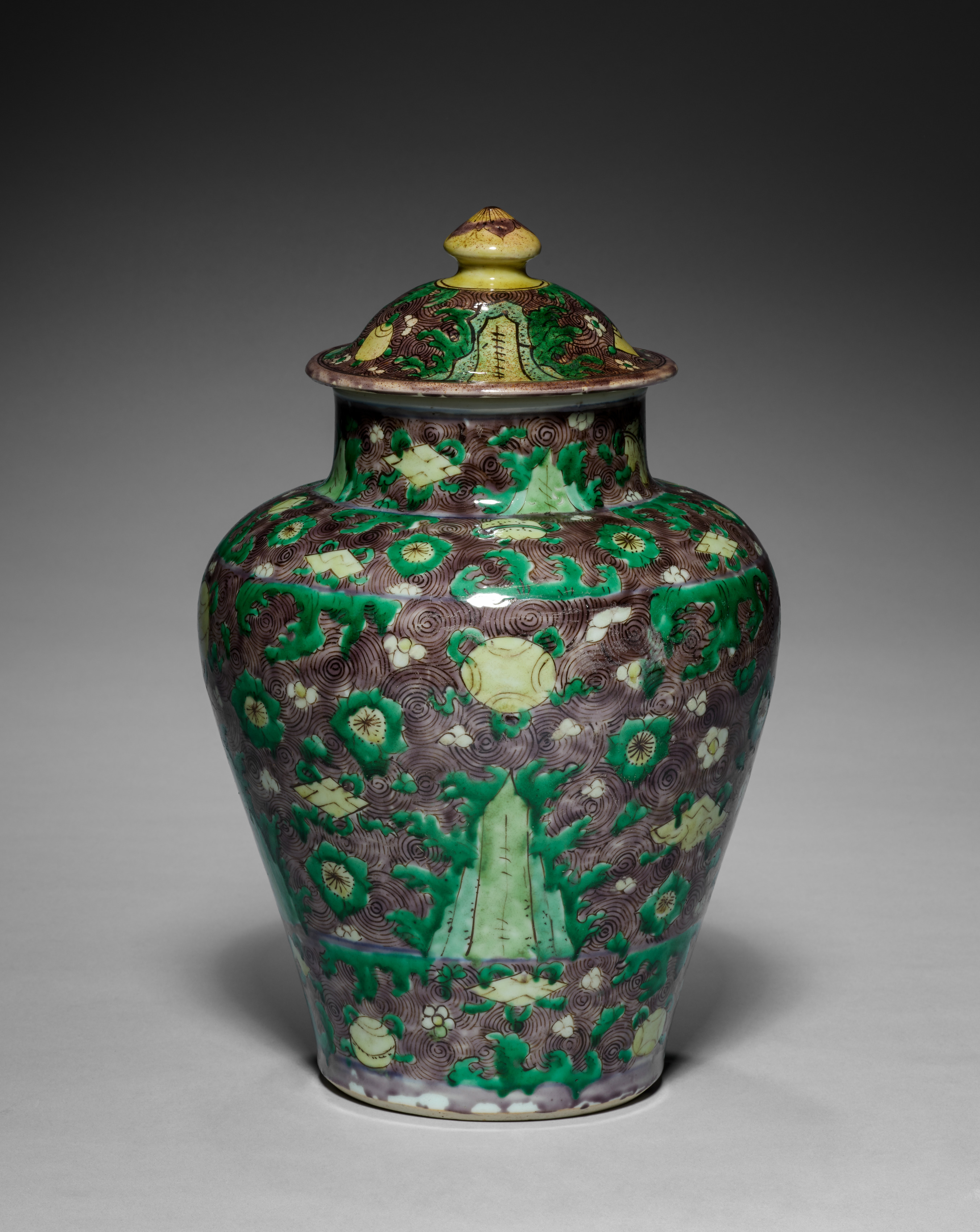
Wucai baluster jar and cover with overglaze enamel decoration, late Ming dynasty, Transitional period (c. 1640). Cleveland Museum of Art

It has its origins in the doucai technique. The usual distinction made with doucai, which also combines underglaze blue with overglaze enamels in other colours, is that in wucai only parts of the design include blue, and these cover wider areas, and are often rather freely painted. In doucai the whole design is outlined in the blue, even if parts are overlaid by the enamels and invisible in the finished product. Some parts may also be painted in the blue. However, this is not true of all pieces classified as doucai, especially from the 18th century onwards. Fragments of incomplete examples, only done in blue, have been excavated from waste tips at the kiln.

The next development, Famille verte (康熙五彩, Kangxi wucai, also 素三彩, Susancai), adopted in the Kangxi period (1662–1722), uses green and iron red with other overglaze colours developed from wucai, normally without any use of underglaze blue.

In Japan it is pronounced gosai and was initially imported. Kinrande is a form that developed out of this during the time of the Ming dynasty.

== See also ==
- Benjarong - In Thai case.
