= Kotō Prefectural Natural Park =

Natural park of Shiga prefecture, Japan

- 湖東県立自然公園
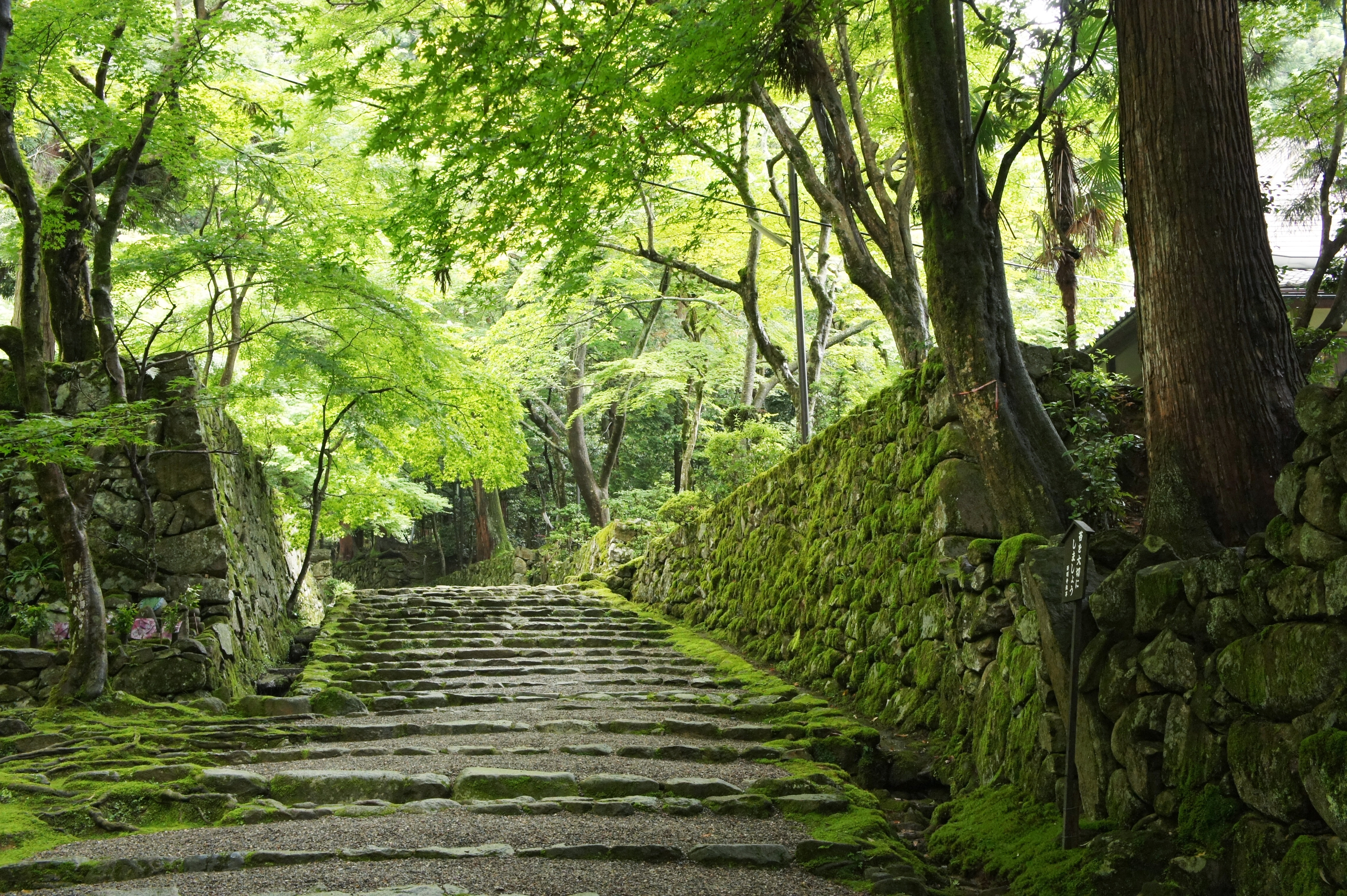
- Saimyō-ji
- Interactive map of Kotō Prefectural Natural Park
- Location: Shiga Prefecture, Japan
- Area: 43.67 km^{2} (16.86 sq mi)
- Established: 15 May 1987

Kotō Prefectural Natural Park (湖東県立自然公園, Kotō kenritsu shizen kōen) is a Prefectural Natural Park in Shiga Prefecture, Japan. Established in 1987, the park comprises areas of the eastern plains of Lake Biwa and the foothills of the Suzuka Mountains. It spans the municipalities of Aishō, Higashiōmi, Hikone, Kōra and Taga, and encompasses the temples of Hyakusai-ji (百済寺), Kongōrin-ji (金剛輪寺), and Saimyō-ji (西明寺).

== See also ==
- National Parks of Japan
- Biwako Quasi-National Park
