= Kotō ware =

Type of Japanese porcelain ware

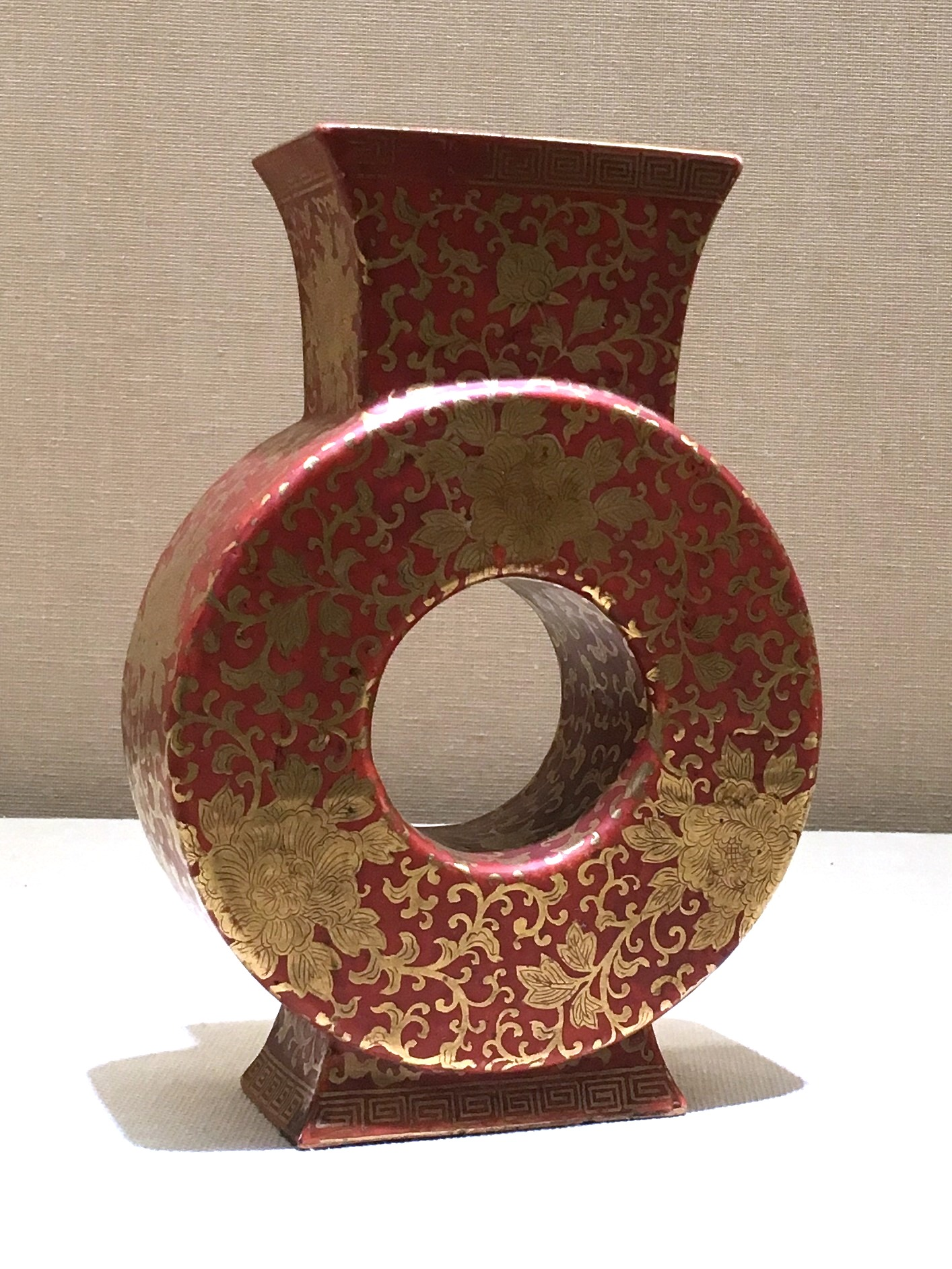
Kotō ware flower vase, overglaze red and gold kinrande. Edo period, 19th century

Kotō ware (湖東焼, Kotō-yaki) is a type of Japanese porcelain traditionally made in Hikone, Shiga in the former Ōmi Province.

== History ==
Hikone lies on the eastern shore of Lake Biwa. Production is centered around Hikone Castle. The Ii lords of Hikone Domain became the patrons and continued this tradition until the Meiji restoration in the years Tenpō 13 ~ Bunkyū 2 (1842 ~ 1862). The 15th lord, Ii Naosuke, was an enthusiastic and accomplished practitioner of the Japanese tea ceremony in the Sekishūryū style. His writings include at least two works on the tea ceremony. He invited potters and painters from all over Japan to come and further develop Kotō ware. Painters such as Kosai and Meiho improved the art form. Lord Ii Naosuke was assassinated during the Sakuradamon Incident (1860), the downfall of the family began, and the patronage of the production of kotō ware was gradually lost, ceasing in 1895.

The kiln (kama-ba ato (窯場跡)) has been inscribed by the government into the List of Historic Sites of Japan (Shiga). There are attempts to revive it.

== Characteristics ==
Many pieces of high quality were produced, such as aka-e kinsai, blue and white pottery, a wide variety of other wares such as celadon, copies of ko-Kutani ware, Oribe ware, and Nonomura Ninsei's wares.
