= Koto, Konjic =

Village in Bosnia and Herzegovina

Koto
- Village
- Location within Bosnia and Herzegovina
- Country: Bosnia and Herzegovina
- Entity: Federation of Bosnia and Herzegovina
- Canton: Herzegovina-Neretva
- Municipality: Konjic

Area
  - Total: 1.12 sq mi (2.90 km^{2})

Population (2013)
  - Total: 15
  - Density: 13/sq mi (5.2/km^{2})
- Time zone: UTC+1 (CET)
  - Summer (DST): UTC+2 (CEST)

Koto is a village in the municipality of Konjic, Bosnia and Herzegovina.

== Demographics ==
According to the 2013 census, its population was 15, all Bosniaks.
