= Codo =

Codo may refer to:

- Codo, Aragon, a municipality in the province of Zaragoza, Aragon, Spain
- Codó, a city in Maranhão, Brazil
- "Codo", a 1983 single by the Austrian group DÖF

== See also ==
- Kodo (disambiguation)
- CODOE, combined diesel or electric type propulsion in US Navy vessels
- Cờ Đỏ, township (thị trấn) and capital of Cờ Đỏ District, Cần Thơ, Vietnam
