= Kōdo Station =

Kōdo Station may refer to two different train stations in Japan:

- Kōdo Station (Kyoto) (興戸駅), on the Kintetsu Kyoto Line in Kyōtanabe, Kyoto, Japan, opened 1954
- Kōdo Station (Hiroshima) (河戸駅), a former train station on the Kabe Line in Asakita-ku, Hiroshima, Japan, operated 1956–2003
