= Bernard Koto =

Malagasy politician

Bernard Koto is a Malagasy politician. A member of the National Assembly of Madagascar, he was elected under the Tiako I Madagasikara party in the 2007 Malagasy parliamentary elections. He represented the constituency of Ifanadiana.

He was named Minister of Environment in 2007. During his mandate there had been illegal cuts of rosewood for which he had been accused being responsible by the Malagasy Bureau of Investigations (Bianco). He now works for an NGO: Seeds Madagascar.
