= Koto Ishiwatari =

Japanese nurse

- Born: 1874; Tokyo, Japan
- Died: 1947 (aged 72–73)
- Occupation: Nurse
- Known for: Japan's first nurse in leprosy hospital under Kensuke Mitsuda

Koto Ishiwatari (石渡こと, 1874–1947) was a Japanese nurse who worked for Hansen's disease patients for 34 years from 1902 to 1936. She was a pioneer in this field and assisted Kensuke Mitsuda and other workers well in Hansen's disease hospitals.

== Life ==
Born in 1874 in Tokyo, she began to work for leprosy patients in 1901. Kensuke Mitsuda made a special leprosy ward called Kaishun Byoshitsu in Tokyo Metropolitan Yoiku-In which was established by Tokyo City (director was Eiichi Shibusawa) in 1901 and she became the nurse in charge of the ward. At that time she helped Kensuke Mitsuda to do autopsy late at night. At the start of Zensho Byoin, Tama Zenshoen Sanatorium, she was made the top nurse in 1909. She became the nurse director of the sanatorium in 1924. At the start of the Zensho Hospital, there were only 3 physicians and five nurses. She devised a portable boat-like bathtub for washing leprosy patients and her devotion and treatments of patients by the Mitsuda fashion were well appreciated. She retired in 1936 and died in 1947. Her photographs were found in a book entitled The 120 year history of Kouyama Fukusei Byoin. In another book, Fumio Hayashi wrote a chapter on Ishiwatari with admiration when she retired.
