= List of downloadable songs for the SingStar series =

SingStar is a series of music video games developed by London Studio and published by Sony Computer Entertainment for the PlayStation 2, PlayStation 3 and PlayStation 4 video game consoles. Gameplay in the SingStar games requires players to sing along to music in order to score points, using SingStar-specific USB microphones which ship with the game. Over 70 different SingStar SKUs have been released worldwide, featuring over 1,500 disc-based songs.

Editions of SingStar for the PlayStation 3 & PlayStation 4 support downloadable content in the form of additional songs for the game. Almost all songs are available for purchase individually, although some songs can only be purchased in themed packs of five. Over 1600 songs have been made available as downloadable content, including a total of 569 English-language songs. Songs are made available worldwide where possible, although regional differences exist due to licensing and censorship restrictions. The success of the SingStore exceeded the expectations of the game's developers, with over 2.2 million songs purchased from the online service as of August 2008.

== Downloadable songs ==
=== Danish ===
Year	Artist	Title	DK	UK	US
2001	Blå Øjne	"Fiskene I Havet"	Yes	Yes	No
2000	Brødrene Olsen	"Smuk Som Et Stjerneskud"	Yes	Yes	No
1971	John Mogensen	"Der Er Noget Galt I Danmark"	Yes	Yes	Yes
2005	Johnny Deluxe	"Drenge Som Mig"	Yes	Yes	Yes
2004	Johnny Deluxe	"Vi Vil Ha' Mer'"	Yes	Yes	Yes
2004	Johnny Deluxe feat. Anna Nordell	"Drømmer Jeg?"	Yes	Yes	No
2009	Jooks	"Hun vil ha' en rapper"	Yes	Yes	No
2005	Magtens Korridorer	"Picnic Pa Kastellet"	Yes	Yes	No
2006	Nik & Jay	"Boing"	Yes	Yes	No
2002	Nik & Jay	"Hot"	Yes	Yes	No
2003	Nik & Jay	"En Dag Tilbage"	Yes	Yes	No
2003	Nik & Jay	"Lækker"	Yes	Yes	No
2006	Rasmus Nøhr	"Sommer I Europa"	Yes	Yes	Yes
2001	Rollo & King	"Der Står Et Billed Af Dig På Mit Bord"	Yes	Yes	Yes
2004	Swan Lee	"I Don't Mind"	Yes	Yes	Yes
2005	TV-2	"De Første Kærester På Månen"	Yes	Yes	Yes
2007	TV-2	"Randers Station"	Yes	Yes	Yes

=== Dutch ===
Year	Artist	Title	NL	UK	US
2006	Ali B Ft. Yes-R & The Partysquad	"Rampeneren"	Yes	Yes	Yes
1981	Andre Hazes	"Zij Gelooft In Mij"	Yes	Yes	No
1981	Benny Neyman	"Vrijgezel"	Yes	Yes	Yes
1983	Circus Custers	"Verliefd"	Yes	Yes	Yes
1986	Erik Mesie	"Zonder Jou"	Yes	Yes	Yes
2007	Fixkes	"Kvraagetaan"	Yes	Yes	No
1996	Fluitsma En Van Tijn	"15 Miljoen Mensen"	Yes	Yes	No
1985	Frank Boeijen	"Kronenburg Park"	Yes	Yes	Yes
2003	Frans Bauer	"Heb je even voor mij"	Yes	Yes	Yes
2007	Gerard Joling	"Maak Me Gek"	Yes	Yes	No
2009	Guus Meeuwis	"Ik Ook Van Jou"	Yes	Yes	No
2009	Guus Meeuwis	"Laat Mij In Die Waan"	Unknown	Yes	Unknown
1995	Guus Meeuwis & Vagant	"Het is een nacht... Live versie"	Yes	Yes	No
2007	Guus Meeuwis	"Proosten"	Yes	Yes	No
1996	Guus Meeuwis	"Verliefd Zijn"	Yes	Yes	No
1986	Hans de Booy	"Alle Vrouwen"	Yes	Yes	Yes
1999	Heideroosjes	"Iedereen Is Gek"	Yes	Yes	No
1982	Het Goede Doel	"Belgie"	Yes	Yes	Yes
1986	Johan Verminnen	"Mooie Dagen"	Yes	Yes	Yes
1983	Kadanz	"Intimiteit"	Yes	Yes	Yes
1993	De Kast	"Morgen Wordt Het Beter"	Yes	Yes	Yes
1988	Koos Alberts	"Zijn Het Je Ogen"	Yes	Yes	Yes
2008	Peter Van De Veire	"Neem Me Mee"	Yes	Yes	No

=== Finnish ===
Year	Artist	Title	FI	UK	US
1995	Aki Sirkesalo	"Naispaholainen"	Yes	Yes	Yes
2003	Anssi Kela	"1972"	Yes	Yes	No
2001	Anssi Kela	"Milla"	Yes	Yes	No
2005	Antti Tuisku	"Tyhjä huone"	Yes	Yes	Yes
1997	Don Huonot	"Hyvää yötä ja huomenta"	Yes	Yes	No
1997	Don Huonot	"Riidankylväjä"	Yes	Yes	No
1995	Don Huonot	"Seireeni"	Yes	Yes	Unknown
2003	Egotrippi	"Matkustaja"	Yes	Yes	No
2006	Egotrippi	"Nämä ajat eivät ole meitä varten"	Yes	Yes	No
2003	Egotrippi	"Älä koskaan ikinä"	Yes	Yes	Unknown
1986	Eppu Normaali	"Joka päivä ja joka ikinen yö"	Yes	Yes	Unknown
1985	Eppu Normaali	"Vuonna '85"	Yes	Yes	Yes
2003	Jonna Tervomaa	"Rakkauden haudalla"	Yes	Yes	No
2008	Happoradio	"Che Guevara"	Yes	Yes	Unknown
2008	Happoradio	"Hirsipuu"	Yes	Yes	Unknown
2008	Happoradio	"Puhu äänellä jonka kuulen"	Yes	Yes	No
2008	Idols 2008	"Hyvää yötä ja huomenta"	Yes	Yes	No
2004	Indica	"Ikuinen virta"	Yes	Yes	Yes
2007	Indica	"Linnansa vanki"	Yes	Yes	Unknown
2005	Indica	"Pidä kädestä"	Yes	Yes	Unknown
2008	Indica	"Valoissa"	Yes	Yes	Unknown
1985	J. Karjalainen ja Mustat Lasit	"Doris"	Yes	Yes	Yes
2003	Jore Marjaranta	"Haaveet kaatuu"	Yes	Yes	No
2007	Katri Ylander	"Valehdellaan"	Yes	Yes	No
2003	Kotiteollisuus	"Helvetistä itään"	Yes	Yes	Yes
2003	Kotiteollisuus	"Tämän taivaan alla"	Yes	Yes	Yes
1986	Leevi and the Leavings	"Laura Jenna Ellinoora Alexandra Camilla Jurvanen"	Yes	Yes	No
1986	Leevi and the Leavings	"Pohjois-Karjala"	Yes	Yes	Yes
1997	Neljä Baritonia	"Pop-musiikkia"	Yes	Yes	Unknown
1992	Neljä Ruusua	"Juppihippipunkkari"	Yes	Yes	Yes
1999	Paula Koivuniemi	"Kuuntelen Tomppaa"	Yes	Yes	Unknown
1980	Pelle Miljoona Oy	"Moottoritie on kuuma"	Yes	Yes	Yes
2009	PMMP	"Lautturi"	Yes	Yes	No
2005	PMMP	"Pikkuveli"	Yes	Yes	Yes
2006	PMMP	"Tässä elämä on"	Yes	Yes	Unknown
1994	Popeda	"Tahdotko mut tosiaan"	Yes	Yes	No
1995	Samuli Edelmann + Sani	"Tuhat yötä"	Yes	Yes	Unknown
2004	Stella	"Aamun kuiskaus"	Yes	Yes	Yes
2008	Stella	"Korkokengät"	Yes	Yes	Yes
1991	Suurlähettiläät	"Elokuun 11."	Yes	Yes	Yes
2004	Tiktak	"Heilutaan"	Yes	Yes	No
2005	Uniklubi	"Huomenna"	Yes	Yes	Unknown
2007	Uniklubi	"Luotisade"	Yes	Yes	Unknown
1984	Yö	"Joutsenlaulu"	Yes	Yes	Yes
2003	Yö	"Rakkaus on lumivalkoinen"	Yes	Yes	Yes
2007	Yö	"Rakkautta vain"	Yes	Yes	No

=== French ===
Year	Artist	Title	FR	UK	US
1999	113	"Tonton du bled"	Yes	Yes	No
1993	Alain Souchon	"Foule sentimentale"	Yes	Yes	Yes
1993	Alain Souchon	"L'amour à la machine"	Yes	Yes	No
1999	Alain Souchon	"Le Baiser"	Yes	Yes	Yes
2008	Alain Souchon	"Parachute Dore"	Yes	Yes	Yes
1988	Alain Souchon	"Quand Je Serai KO"	Yes	Yes	Yes
1993	Alain Souchon	"Sous Les Jupes des Filles"	Yes	Yes	Yes
1988	Alain Souchon	"Ultra Moderne Solitude"	Yes	Yes	Yes
2007	Alizée	"Mademoiselle Juliette"	Yes	Yes	No
2007	Amel Bent	"Tu n'es plus là"	Yes	Yes	No
2004	Anggun	"Cesse La Pluie"	Yes	Yes	Yes
2005	Anggun	"Être Une Femme"	Yes	Yes	No
2006	Anggun	"Juste Avant Toi"	Yes	Yes	Yes
2003	Arkol	"Vingt ans"	Yes	Yes	No
2008	Bébé Lilly	"Dans L'espace"	Yes	Yes	Yes
2007	Bébé Lilly	"Les Cowboys"	Yes	Yes	No
2007	Bébé Lilly	"Les Pirates"	Yes	Yes	Yes
2001	Bénabar	"Y'a une fille qu'habite chez moi"	Yes	Yes	No
2004	Camille	"Ta Douleur"	Yes	Yes	No
2009	Christophe Willem	"Berlin"	Yes	Yes	No
2007	Christophe Willem	"Double Je"	Yes	Yes	No
2007	Christophe Willem	"Jacques a dit"	Yes	Yes	No
2006	Clara Morgane	"Sexy Girl"	Yes	Yes	No
2006	Emmanuel Moire	"Le Sourire"	Yes	Yes	No
2005	Eskobar avec Emma Daumas	"You Got Me"	Yes	Yes	No
2007	Étienne Daho	"L'Invitation"	Yes	Yes	Yes
2005	Fatal Bazooka	"Fous ta cagoule"	Yes	Yes	No
2001	Frédéric Lerner	"On partira"	Yes	Yes	Yes
2007	Frédéric Lerner	"Plus Là"	Yes	Yes	Yes
2008	Gaëtane Abrial	"68-2008"	Yes	Yes	No
2008	Gilles Gabriel	"Flou de toi"	Yes	Yes	No
2008	Grégoire	"Rue des étoiles"	Yes	Yes	Yes
2008	Grégoire	"Ta main"	Yes	Yes	No
2008	Grégoire	"Toi + Moi"	Yes	Yes	No
2009	Helmut Fritz	"Ça m'énerve"	Yes	Yes	No
2006	Jane Fostin en duo avec Medhy Custos	"Pas de glace"	Yes	Yes	No
2007	Julien Doré	"Moi Lolita"	Yes	Yes	No
2006	Kamini	"Marly-Gomont"	Yes	Yes	No
2007	Kenza Farah	"Je Me Bats"	Yes	Yes	No
2005	K.Maro	"Histoires de Luv"	Yes	Yes	No
2002	Kyo	"Je Cours"	Yes	Yes	Yes
2002	Kyo	"Dernière danse"	Yes	Yes	No
2004	Kyo	"Qui Je Suis"	Yes	Yes	Yes
2002	Kyo	"Je Saigne Encore"	Yes	Yes	No
2002	Kyo feat. Sita	"Le Chemin"	Yes	Yes	No
1999	Lââm	"Jamais Loin De Toi"	Yes	Yes	No
2005	Lââm	"Pour être libre"	Yes	Yes	Yes
2004	Lââm	"Petite sœur"	Yes	Yes	No
2008	Leslie	"Mise Au Point"	Yes	Yes	No
2007	Little	"J'veux Des Violons"	Yes	Yes	No
2008	Loane	"Jamais Seule"	Yes	Yes	No
2004	Luke	"Hasta siempre"	Yes	Yes	No
2004	Luke	"La sentinelle"	Yes	Yes	No
2004	Luke	"Soledad"	Yes	Yes	No
2004	Lynnsha	"S'Evader"	Yes	Yes	No
2006	Mademoiselle K	"Ça Me Vexe"	Yes	Yes	No
2008	Mademoiselle K	"Grave"	Yes	Yes	Yes
2007	Magic System	"On Va Samize"	Yes	Yes	No
2007	Magic System	"Zouglou Dance"	Yes	Yes	Yes
2008	Manu	"Tes Cicatrices"	Yes	Yes	Yes
2007	Mokobé feat. Patson	"C'est dans la joie"	Yes	Yes	No
2007	Neïman	"Viens"	Yes	Yes	No
2007	NZH	"Princess"	Yes	Yes	No
2008	Olivia Ruiz	"J'traîne des pieds"	Yes	Yes	No
2007	Pauline	"Âllo le monde"	Yes	Yes	No
2003	Pearl	"J'ai Des Choses À Te Dire"	Yes	Yes	No
1982	Philippe Lavil	"Il tape sur des bambous"	Yes	Yes	No
2006	Plastiscines	"Loser"	Yes	Yes	No
2006	Pleymo	"Adrenaline"	Yes	Yes	No
2003	Pleymo	"Moddadiction"	Yes	Yes	No
2008	Raphaël	"Adieu Haïti"	Yes	Yes	Yes
2005	Raphaël	"Caravane"	Yes	Yes	Yes
2006	Shy'm	"Femme de couleur"	Yes	Yes	No
2006	Shy'm	"Oublie Moi"	Yes	Yes	No
2006	Shy'm	"T'es Parti"	Yes	Yes	No
2006	Shy'm	"Victoire"	Yes	Yes	No
2006	Sinclair	"A Chaque Seconde"	Yes	Yes	No
2001	Sinclair	"Ca m'fait plus mal"	Yes	Yes	No
1997	Sinclair	"Ensemble"	Yes	Yes	Yes
1998	Sinclair	"Si C'est Bon Comme Ça"	Yes	Yes	Yes
2001	Sinclair	"Supernova Superstar"	Yes	Yes	No
1993	Sinclair	"Votre Image"	Yes	Yes	No
2007	Soha	"Tourbillon"	Yes	Yes	No
2007	Soprano – Blacko	"Ferme Les Yeux Et Imagine Toi"	Yes	Yes	No
2007	Subway	"Paris"	Yes	Yes	Yes
2003	Tété	"La faveur de l'automne"	Yes	Yes	No
2005	Têtes Raides	"Fragile"	Yes	Yes	No
1999	Tina Arena	"Aller plus haut"	Yes	Yes	No
2007	Tina Arena	"Entends-tu le monde?"	Yes	Yes	No
2007	Vegastar	"5h Dans Ta Peau"	Yes	Yes	No
2007	Viky	"Viky le petit dauphin"	Yes	Yes	Yes
2007	Vitaa	"A fleur de toi"	Yes	Yes	No
2003	Willy Denzey	"Le Mur Du Son"	Yes	Yes	No
2003	Willy Denzey	"L'Orphelin"	Yes	Yes	No
2007	Yelle	"A Cause Des Garçons"	Yes	Yes	No
2007	Yelle	"Ce Jeu"	Yes	Yes	No
2008	Zaho	"C'est Chelou"	Yes	Yes	Yes

=== German ===
Year	Artist	Title	DE	UK	US
2006	2raumwohnung	"36grad"	Yes	Yes	Yes
2007	2raumwohnung	"Besser Geht's Nicht"	Yes	Yes	Yes
2005	2raumwohnung	"Melancholisch Schön"	Yes	Yes	Yes
2001	2raumwohnung	"Nimm Mich Mit – Das Abenteuer Liebe Usw"	Yes	Yes	Yes
2004	2raumwohnung	"Spiel Mit"	Yes	Yes	Yes
2000	2raumwohnung	"Wir Trafen Uns In Einem Garten"	Yes	Yes	No
2007	Almklausi	"Ich Vermiss Dich (Wie Die H?lle)"	Yes	Yes	No
2008	Almklausi	"LoLoLos Geht’s"	Unknown	Yes	Unknown
2011	Andreas Bourani	"Nur In Meinem Kopf"	Yes	No	No
2010	Anna-Maria	"Wer Ist Dieser DJ"	Yes	Yes	No
2010	Bakkushan	"Baby Du Siehst Gut Aus"	Unknown	Yes	Unknown
1981	BAP	"Verdamp lang her"	Yes	Yes	Yes
2006	Blumentopf	"Horst"	Yes	Yes	Yes
2014	Broilers	"Ist Da Jemand?"	Yes	Yes	Yes
2004	Buddy	"Ab In Den Süden 2004"	Yes	Yes	No
2000	Büne Huber	"Juanita la luna"	Yes	Yes	No
2010	Chris Marlow	"Santa Maria"	Yes	No	No
2005	Christina Stürmer	"Ich Lebe 2005"	Yes	No	No
2006	Christina Stürmer	"Immer an euch geglaubt"	Yes	No	No
2006	Christina Stürmer	"Nie genug"	Yes	No	No
2007	Christina Stürmer	"Scherbenmeer"	Yes	No	No
2008	Clueso	"Keinen Zentimeter"	Yes	Yes	Yes
2005	Clueso	"Kein Bock Zu Geh'n"	Yes	Yes	No
2008	Clueso	"Mitnehm"	Yes	Yes	Yes
2009	Culcha Candela	"Schöne Neue Welt"	Yes	No	No
1995	Dieter Thomas Kuhn	"Es War Sommer (Die Wahre Geschichte)"	Yes	Yes	No
1989	Die Toten Hosen	"1000 gute Gründe"	Yes	Yes	Yes
2009	Die Toten Hosen	"Alles was war"	Yes	Yes	Yes
1988	Die Toten Hosen	"Hier kommt Alex"	Yes	Yes	Yes
2002	Die Toten Hosen	"Nur zu Besuch"	Yes	Yes	Yes
2008	Die Toten Hosen	"Strom"	Yes	Yes	Yes
2012	Die Toten Hosen	"Tage Wie Diese"	Yes	Yes	Yes
2010	DJ Abschleppdienst	"Party, Palmen, Weiber Und’n Bier (Beach Mix)"	Unknown	Yes	Unknown
2008	DJ Ötzi	"Noch in 100.000 Jahren"	Yes	Yes	No
2007	DJ Ötzi & Nik P.	"Ein Stern (...der deinen Namen trägt)"	Yes	Yes	No
1995	Die Doofen	"Mief! (Nimm mich jetzt, auch wenn ich stinke!)"	Yes	Yes	No
1999	Echt	"Weinst Du"	Yes	Yes	No
1981	Extrabreit	"Flieger, Grüß Mir Die Sonne"	Yes	Yes	No
1998	Falco	"Out Of The Dark"	Yes	Yes	Yes
1985	Falco	"Rock Me Amadeus"	Yes	Yes	Yes
2006	Die Familie	"Und Tschüss"	Yes	Yes	No
1997	Die Fantastischen Vier	"Der Picknicker"	Yes	Yes	No
1992	Die Fantastischen Vier	"Die da!?"	Yes	Yes	No
2004	Die Fantastischen Vier	"Geboren"	Yes	Yes	Yes
2007	Die Fantastischen Vier	"IchIsIchIsIchIsIch"	Yes	Yes	No
1993	Die Fantastischen Vier	"Lass die Sonne rein"	Yes	Yes	No
1999	Die Fantastischen Vier	"MfG – Mit freundlichen Grüßen"	Yes	Yes	No
1995	Die Fantastischen Vier	"Sie Ist Weg"	Yes	Yes	No
2003	Franziska	"Schau Mir Ins Gesicht"	Yes	Yes	Yes
1997	Freundeskreis	"A-N-N-A"	Yes	Yes	No
2006	Fritz and the Downhill Gang	"Genie Auf Die Ski"	Yes	Yes	No
2005	Glashaus	"Haltet Die Welt An"	Yes	Yes	Yes
2011	Glasperlenspiel	"Echt"	Yes	No	No
1998	Guildo Horn & Die Orthopädischen Strümpfe	"Guildo Hat Euch Lieb"	Yes	Yes	No
2007	Helge Schneider	"Käsebrot"	Yes	Yes	Yes
2007	Höhner	"Wenn Nicht Jetzt, Wann Dann (Weltmeister Version)?"	Yes	Yes	No
2003	Höhner	"Viva Colonia (Da Simmer Dabei, Dat Is Prima!)"	Yes	Yes	No
2005	Hund Am Strand	"Jungen Mädchen"	Yes	Yes	Yes
2005	Ich + Ich	"Du Erinnerst Mich An Liebe"	Yes	Yes	No
2007	Ich + Ich	"Stark"	Yes	Yes	No
2005	Ich + Ich	"Umarme Mich"	Yes	Yes	No
1983	IXI	"Der Knutschfleck"	Yes	Yes	No
2006	Jan Delay	"Für immer und dich"	Yes	Yes	No
2006	Jan Delay	"Klar"	Yes	Yes	No
2002	Jennifer Rostock	"Was Auch Immer"	Yes	Yes	No
2008	Joy Denalane	"Kopf Oder Zahl"	Yes	Yes	No
2004	Juli	"Geile Zeit"	Yes	Yes	No
2004	Juli	"Perfekte Welle"	Yes	Yes	No
2006	Juli	"Wir beide"	Yes	Yes	No
2006	Jumpy & Mungo Jerry	"In Der Winterzeit"	Yes	Yes	Yes
1999	Jürgen Drews	"König Von Mallorca"	Unknown	Yes	Unknown
1984	Klaus Lage	"1000 Und 1 Nacht"	Yes	Yes	No
1984	Killerpilze	"Ich kann auch ohne dich"	Yes	Yes	No
2005	Klee	"Gold"	Yes	Yes	Yes
2008	Krümel	"Mädchen Mädchen"	Yes	Yes	No
2007	Krümel	"Zieh Dich Aus Wir Müssen Reden"	Yes	Yes	Yes
2003	Laith Al-Deen	"Alles An Dir"	Yes	Yes	No
2000	Laith Al-Deen	"Bilder Von Dir"	Yes	Yes	No
2007	Laith Al-Deen	"Es wird nicht leicht sein"	Yes	Yes	No
2005	Laith Al-Deen	"Leb Den Tag"	Yes	Yes	No
2006	Die Lollies	"Wenn Du denkst Du denkst, dann denkst Du nur Du denkst"	Yes	Yes	No
1994	Lucilectric	"Mädchen"	Yes	Yes	No
2002	Luka Neuser	"Zeit Für Helden"	Yes	Yes	No
2006	Luttenberger*Klug	"Super Sommer"	Yes	Yes	Yes
2008	Marco Bandero	Herzfest	Unknown	Yes	Unknown
2004	Max Herre	"Du weisst (Bye Bye Baby)"	Yes	Yes	No
2007	Maya Saban	"Hautnah"	Yes	Yes	No
2005	Maya Saban + Cosmo Klein	"Das Alles Ändert Nichts Daran"	Yes	Yes	No
2004	Mellow Mark	"Was Geht Ab Mit Der Liebe"	Yes	Yes	Yes
2007	MIA.	"Engel"	Yes	Yes	Yes
2002	MIA.	"Alles neu"	Yes	Yes	Yes
2008	MIA.	"Mein Freund"	Yes	Yes	Yes
2007	MIA.	"Tanz Der Moleküle"	Yes	Yes	Yes
2006	MIA.	"Zirkus"	Yes	Yes	Yes
2009	Mia Aegerter	"Land In Sicht"	Yes	Yes	Yes
2010	Michael Wendler	"Nina"	Yes	Yes	No
2004	Michael Wendler	"Sie Liebt Den DJ"	Yes	Yes	No
2006	Mickie Krause	"Laudato Si"	Yes	Yes	Yes
2006	Mondscheiner	"Das Was Wir Sind"	Yes	Yes	No
2007	Mondscheiner	"Dieser Tag"	Yes	Yes	No
1997	Mozart	"Queen Of The Night Aria"	Yes	Yes	No
1985	Münchener Freiheit	"Ohne Dich (Schlaf' Ich Heut' Nacht Nicht Ein)"	Yes	Yes	Yes
1983	Nena	"99 Luftballons"	Yes	Yes	Yes
1983	Nino de Angelo	"Jenseits von Eden"	Yes	Yes	Yes
2006	Ohrbooten	"An alle Ladies"	Yes	Yes	No
2007	Ohrbooten	"Bewegung"	Yes	Yes	No
2009	Ohrbooten	"Mit dem Kopf durch die Wand"	Yes	Yes	No
2004	Olaf Henning	"Cowboy und Indianer"	Yes	Yes	No
2006	Olesoul	"Was Kostet Die Welt"	Yes	Yes	No
2004	Oomph!	"Augen Auf"	Yes	Yes	Yes
1996	Patent Ochsner	"W. Nuss Vo Bümpliz"	Yes	Yes	No
2008	Peter Wackel	"Joana"	Yes	Yes	No
2005	Peter Wackel	"Ladioo"	Yes	Yes	No
2006	Peter Wackel	"Ü 30"	Yes	Yes	No
2005	Pohlmann.	"Wenn Jetzt Sommer Wär"	Yes	Yes	Yes
2007	PS Alex	"Eine Frau Die Mich Nach Hause Trägt"	Yes	Yes	No
1995	Pur	"Abenteuerland"	Yes	Yes	Yes
1996	Pur	"Ein Graues Haar	Yes	Yes	Yes
2004	QL	"Ewigi Liebi"	Yes	Yes	Yes
1988	Rainbirds	"Blueprint"	Yes	Yes	Yes
2004	De Randfichten	"Lebt Denn Dr Alte Holzmichl Noch...?"	Yes	Yes	Yes
2006	Revolverheld	"Freunde Bleiben"	Yes	Yes	No
2005	Revolverheld	"Generation Rock"	Yes	Yes	Yes
2007	Revolverheld	"Ich Werd' Die Welt Verändern"	Yes	Yes	No
2006	Revolverheld	"Mit Dir Chilln"	Yes	Yes	Yes
2005	Revolverheld	"Die Welt Steht Still"	Yes	Yes	Yes
1986	Rio Reiser	"König Von Deutschland"	Yes	Yes	Yes
1980	Roland Kaiser	"Santa Maria"	Yes	No	No
2006	Rosenstolz	"Auch Im Regen"	Yes	No	No
2007	Rosenstolz	"Aus Liebe Wollt Ich Alles Wissen"	Yes	No	No
2001	Rosenstolz	"Es Könnt' Ein Anfang Sein"	Yes	No	No
2008	Rosenstolz	"Gib mir Sonne"	Yes	No	No
2006	Rosenstolz	"Ich Bin Ich (Wir Sind Wir)"	Yes	No	No
2006	Rosenstolz	"Ich Geh In Flammen Auf"	Yes	No	No
2008	Rosenstolz	"Wie Weit Ist Vorbei"	Yes	No	No
2004	Rosenstolz	"Willkommen"	Yes	No	No
2007	Rühmann's (Sch)erben	"Ein Freund, Ein Guter Freund"	Yes	Yes	No
2006	Sebastian Hämer	"Sommer Unseres Lebens"	Yes	Yes	Yes
1995	Selig	"Ist Es Wichtig?"	Yes	Yes	Yes
2009	Selig	"Schau schau"	Yes	Yes	Yes
2008	Schäfer Heinrich	"Das Schäferlied"	Yes	No	No
1981	Spider Murphy Gang	"Skandal im Sperrbezirk"	Yes	Yes	No
2010	Sportfreunde Stiller	"54, ' 74, ' 90, 2010"	Yes	Yes	Yes
2009	Stefan Peters	Schwarze Natascha	Unknown	Yes	Unknown
2008	Tim Toupet	"Ich bin Ein Döner"	Unknown	Yes	Unknown
2008	Tim Toupet	"So A Schöner Tag (Der Flieger)"	Yes	Yes	No
2002	Tocotronic	"This Boy is Tocotronic"	Yes	Yes	Yes
2007	Virginia Jetzt!	"Mehr als das"	Yes	Yes	No
1983	Udo Lindenberg	"Sonderzug Nach Pankow"	Yes	Yes	No
2010	Unheilig	"Geboren um zu leben"	Yes	Yes	No
2012	Unheilig	"So Wie Du Warst"	Yes	Yes	No
1990	Westernhagen	"Freiheit"	Yes	Yes	No
1989	Westernhagen	"Sexy"	Yes	Yes	No
1989	Westernhagen	"Weil Ich Dich Liebe"	Yes	Yes	No
2003	Wir Sind Helden	"Aurélie"	Yes	Yes	No
2003	Wir Sind Helden	"Denkmal"	Yes	Yes	No
2007	Wir Sind Helden	"Endlich Ein Grund Zur Panik"	Yes	Yes	No
2005	Wir Sind Helden	"Nur Ein Wort"	Yes	Yes	Yes
2007	Wir Sind Helden	"Soundso"	Yes	Yes	Yes
2005	Wir Sind Helden	"Von Hier An Blind"	Yes	Yes	Yes
2006	Wir Sind Helden	"Wenn Es Passiert"	Yes	Yes	No
2001	Wise Guys	"Jetzt Ist Sommer"	Yes	Yes	No
1983	Wolfgang Petry	"Wahnsinn"	Yes	Yes	Yes
2006	Yvonne Catterfeld	"Erinner Mich Dich Zu Vergessen"	Yes	Yes	Yes

=== Hindi ===
Year	Artist	Title	NL	UK	US
1989	Aashiqui	"Nazar Ke Samne"	Yes	Yes	No
2003	Chalte Chalte	"Suno Na Suno Na"	Yes	Yes	No
2003	Chameli	"Sajna Ve Sajna"	Yes	Yes	No
2001	Dil Chahta Hai	"Koi Kahe Kehta Rahe"	Yes	Yes	No
2004	Main Hoon Na	"Tumse Milke Dil Ka Hai Jo Haal"	Yes	Yes	No

=== Italian ===
Year	Artist	Title	IT	UK	US
1993	883	"Come mai"	Yes	Yes	Yes
1993	883	"Sei un mito"	Yes	Yes	No
1995	883	"Una canzone d'amore"	Yes	Yes	Yes
2005	Alexia	"Da grande"	Yes	Yes	Yes
2002	Alexia	"Dimmi come"	Yes	Yes	No
2003	Alexia	"Egoista"	Yes	Yes	Yes
1999	Anna Oxa	"Senza pietà"	Yes	Yes	Yes
2002	Daniele Silvestri	"Salirò"	Yes	Yes	Yes
2007	Finley	"Adrenalina"	Yes	Yes	Yes
2006	Finley	"Diventerai una star"	Yes	Yes	Yes
2005	Finley	"Sole di settembre"	Yes	Yes	Yes
2002	Fiorello	"Vivere a colori"	Yes	Yes	No
2003	Giorgia	"Gocce di memoria"	Yes	Yes	Yes
1985	Gruppo Italiano	"Tropicana"	Yes	Yes	Yes
1995	Irene Grandi	"Bambine cattive"	Yes	Yes	No
2005	Irene Grandi	"Lasciala andare"	Yes	Yes	Yes
1990	Litfiba	"El diablo"	Yes	Yes	No
1983	Loredana Bertè	"Il mare d'inverno"	Yes	Yes	Yes
2008	Lost	"Ascolta"	Yes	Yes	No
2008	Lost	"Nel silenzio"	Yes	Yes	No
2008	Lost	"Oggi"	Yes	Yes	No
2008	Lost	"Standby"	Yes	Yes	No
2008	Lost	Tra pioggia e nuvole	Yes	Yes	No
1984	Lu Colombo	"Maracaibo"	Yes	Yes	No
2004	Luca Dirisio	"Calma e sangue freddo"	Yes	Yes	Yes
2004	Luca Di Risio	"Il mio amico vende il tè"	Yes	Yes	No
2004	Max Gazzè	"Cara Valentina"	Yes	Yes	No
1998	Max Gazzè	"Favola di Adamo ed Eva"	Yes	Yes	Yes
2000	Max Gazzè	"L’uomo Più Furbo"	Yes	Yes	No
1999	Max Gazzè	"Una musica può fare"	Yes	Yes	Yes
2004	Max Pezzali	"Lo strano percorso"	Yes	Yes	Yes
2000	Paola & Chiara	"Blu"	Yes	Yes	Yes
2000	Paola & Chiara	"Vamos a bailar (Esta vida nueva)"	Yes	Yes	Yes
2005	Simone Cristicchi	"Vorrei cantare come Biagio"	Yes	Yes	Yes
2002	Subsonica	"Nuova ossessione"	Yes	Yes	Yes
2000	Subsonica	"Tutti i miei sbagli"	Yes	Yes	No
2004	Sugarfree	"Cleptomania"	Yes	Yes	Yes
2006	Tiziano Ferro	"E fuori è buio"	Yes	Yes	No
2006	Tiziano Ferro	"E Raffaella è mia"	Yes	Yes	No
2006	Tiziano Ferro	"Ed ero contentissimo"	Yes	Yes	No
2003	Tiziano Ferro	"Sere nere"	Yes	Yes	No
2006	Tiziano Ferro	"Stop! Dimentica"	Yes	Yes	No
2006	Tiziano Ferro	"Ti scatter? una foto"	Yes	Yes	No
2007	Vasco Rossi	"Basta poco"	Yes	Yes	No
1988	Vasco Rossi	"Io no"	Yes	Yes	Yes
1994	Vasco Rossi	"Senza parole"	Yes	Yes	No
2001	Vasco Rossi	"Siamo soli"	Yes	Yes	No
1983	Vasco Rossi	"Vita spericolata"	Yes	Yes	No
2002	Velvet	"Funzioni primarie"	Yes	Yes	Yes
2005	Zeropositivo	"Fasi"	Yes	Yes	Yes

=== Norwegian ===
Year	Artist	Title	NO	UK	US
1994	Anne Grete Preus	"Månens Elev"	Yes	Yes	Yes
1994	Anne Grete Preus	"Millimeter"	Yes	Yes	Yes
1984	Dollie de Luxe	"Lenge leve livet"	Yes	Yes	Yes
2007	Erik og Kriss	"Den låta"	Yes	Yes	Yes
2007	Erik og Kriss	"Dra tilbake"	Yes	Yes	Yes
2008	Erik og Kriss feat. Finn Wang	"Det e'kke meg det er deg"	Yes	Yes	No
1997	Jan Eggum	"På'an igjen"	Yes	Yes	Yes
1981	Jannicke	"Svake mennesker"	Yes	Yes	No
2002	Kaptein Sabeltann	"Vi seiler vår egen sjø"	Yes	Yes	Yes
1982	Lillebjørn Nilsen	"Tanta til Beate"	Yes	Yes	Yes
2007	Ole Ivars	"Nei, så tjukk du har blitt"	Yes	Yes	No
2005	Phillip & Sandra	"Sommerflørt"	Yes	Yes	Yes
1996	Postgirobygget	"En solskinnsdag"	Yes	Yes	No
1996	Postgirobygget	"Idyll"	Yes	Yes	No
1993	Prepple Houmb & Morten Abel	"Hodet over vannet"	Yes	Yes	No
2003	Tine	"Vil ha deg"	Yes	Yes	Yes
2002	Vamp	"Månemannen"	Yes	Yes	Yes
1993	Vamp	"Tir n'a Noir"	Yes	Yes	Yes

=== Portuguese ===
Year	Artist	Title	PT	UK	US
2008	4TASTE	"Diz Mais Uma Vez"	Yes	Yes	Yes
2006	4TASTE	"Sempre Que Te Vejo (Sinto Um Desejo) (Ao Vivo)"	Yes	Yes	Yes
1998	Adelaide Ferreira	"Dava Tudo"	Yes	Yes	Yes
2004	Adriana Calcanhoto	"Fico Assim Sem Você"	Yes	Yes	No
2006	André Sardet	"Foi feitiço"	Yes	Yes	Yes
2008	Angelico	"Bailarina"	Yes	Yes	Yes
2007	Anjos	"Eu Estou Aqui (Yo soy aquél)"	Yes	Yes	Yes
2007	Avô Cantigas	"Fantasminha Brincalhão"	Yes	Yes	No
2006	Balla	"O Fim Da Luta"	Yes	Yes	Yes
2005	Boss AC	"Hip-hop (sou eu e és tu)"	Yes	Yes	Yes
2008	Boss AC	"Princesa (Beija-me Outra Vez) Feat. Berg"	Yes	Yes	No
2008	Buraka Som Sistema	"Kalemba (Wegue Wegue)"	Unknown	Yes	Unknown
2000	Clã	"Dançar na corda bamba"	Yes	Yes	Yes
2000	Clã	"Sopro Do Coração"	Yes	Yes	Yes
2007	Clã	"Tira A Teima"	Yes	Yes	No
2007	Da Weasel	"Dialectos da Ternura"	Yes	Yes	No
1997	Da Weasel	"Dúia"	Yes	Yes	No
1999	Da Weasel	"Outro Nivel"	Yes	Yes	No
2008	Dama Bete	"Definição de Amor"	Yes	Yes	No
2008	Diana Lucas	"Desculpa L?"	Yes	Yes	Yes
2005	D’ZRT	"Querer Voltar"	Yes	Yes	Yes
2005	D'ZRT	"Para Mim Tanto Faz (Ao Vivo)"	Yes	Yes	Yes
2005	D'ZRT	"Percorre O Meu Sonho"	Unknown	Yes	Yes
2008	D'ZRT	"Stuttgart 4TO"	Yes	Yes	Yes
2006	D'ZRT	"Verão Azul"	Yes	Yes	Yes
1997	Entre Aspas	"Uma Pequena Flor"	Yes	Yes	Yes
2007	EZ Special	"Sei Que Sabes Que Sim"	Yes	Yes	Yes
2006	The Gift	"Fácil de Entender"	Yes	Yes	Yes
2004	Humanos	"Maria Albertina"	Yes	Yes	No
2004	Humanos	"Muda De Vida"	Yes	Yes	Yes
1997	João Pedro Pais	"Louco (por ti)"	Yes	Yes	Yes
2000	João Pedro Pais	"Mentira"	Yes	Yes	Yes
2013	Joka Fantasminha	"A Dança do Joka	Yes	Yes	Yes
2007	Jorge Cruz	"Nada"	Yes	Yes	No
2007	Jorge Palma	"Encosta-te A Mim"	Yes	Yes	Yes
2007	Just Girls	"Bye, Bye (Vou-me Divertir)"	Yes	Yes	Yes
2008	Just Girls	"Entre O Sonho E A Ilus?o"	Yes	Yes	Yes
2007	Just Girls	"Passa O Vento"	Yes	Yes	Yes
1998	Los Hermanos	"Anna Júlia"	Yes	Yes	Yes
2006	Mercano Negro	"Leoa Tigresa"	Yes	Yes	No
2004	Mesa c/ Rui Reininho	"Luz Vaga"	Yes	Yes	Yes
1997	Mind Da Gap	"Dedicatória"	Yes	Yes	Yes
2007	Mundo Cão	"Morfina"	Yes	Yes	No
2008	NBC	"Segunda Pele"	Yes	Yes	Yes
2007	OIOAI	"Jardim Das Estatuas"	Yes	Yes	Yes
2005	Os Azeitonas	"Um Tanto Ou Quanto Atarantado"	Yes	Yes	Yes
2007	Paulo Gonzo	"Sei-te de Cor"	Yes	Yes	Yes
2007	Paulo Gonzo com Lucia Moniz	"Leve Beijo Triste"	Yes	Yes	Yes
2007	Paulo Gonzo c/ Olavo Bilac	"Jardins Proibidos"	Yes	Yes	Yes
2007	Paulo Praça	"(Diz) A Verdade"	Yes	Yes	Yes
2008	Polo Norte	"Asa Livre"	Yes	Yes	No
1980	Sérgio Godinho	"Com Um Brilhozinho Nos Olhos"	Yes	Yes	Yes
1987	Sétima Legião	"Sete Mares"	Yes	Yes	Yes
2010	Sir Giant	"Doce Cereja"	Yes	Yes	Yes
1993	Três Tristes Tigres	"O Mundo A Meus Pés"	Yes	Yes	Yes
2008	TT	"Faz Acontecer"	Yes	Yes	No
2004	Xutos e Pontapés	"Ai Se Ele Cai"	Yes	Yes	No

=== Spanish ===
Year	Artist	Title	ES	UK	US
1986	Aerolíneas Federales	"No Me Beses En Los Labios"	Yes	Yes	Yes
1982	Al Bano y Romina Power	"Felicidad"	Yes	Yes	Yes
1986	Alaska Y Dinarama	"A Quién Le Importa"	Yes	Yes	Yes
1982	Alaska Y Los Pegamoides	"Bailando"	Yes	Yes	Yes
1998	Alejandro Sanz	"Corazón partío"	Yes	Yes	Yes
2003	Alejandro Sanz	"No Es Lo Mismo"	Yes	Yes	Yes
1998	Alejandro Sanz	"Y, ¿si fuera ella?"	Yes	Yes	Yes
2003	Álex Ubago	"Sin Miedo A Nada"	Yes	Yes	Yes
2008	Amaia Montero	"Quiero Ser"	Unknown	Yes	Yes
2005	Amaral	"El Universo Sobre Mí"	Yes	Yes	Yes
2005	Amaral	"Revolución"	Yes	Yes	Yes
2002	Amaral	"Sin Ti No Soy Nada"	Yes	Yes	Yes
1991	Amistades Peligrosas	"Estoy Por Ti"	Yes	Yes	Yes
1986	Ana Belén y Víctor Manuel	"La Puerta De Alcalá"	Yes	Yes	Yes
2007	Andy Y Lucas	"Quiéreme"	Yes	Yes	No
1980	Antonio Flores	"No Dudaría"	Yes	Yes	Yes
1996	Azúcar Moreno	"Sólo Se Vive Una Vez"	Yes	Yes	Yes
2004	Bebe	"Ella"	Yes	Yes	Yes
2004	Bebe	"Siempre Me Quedar?"	Yes	Yes	Yes
2006	Belle Perez	"El Mundo Bailando"	Yes	Yes	No
2004	Bunbury	"Canto (El Mismo Dolor)"	Yes	Yes	Yes
2004	Bunbury	"Que Tengas Suertecita"	Yes	Yes	Yes
1979	Burning	"¿Qué Hace Una Chica Como Tú..?"	Yes	Yes	Yes
1999	Café Quijano	"La Lola"	Yes	Yes	Yes
2001	Café Quijano	"Nada de ná"	Yes	Yes	Yes
1972	Cecilia	"Dama Dama"	Yes	Yes	Yes
2007	Chambao	"Papeles Mojados"	Yes	Yes	Unknown
2003	Chayanne	"Caprichosa"	Yes	Yes	Yes
2007	Conchita	"Nada que perder"	Yes	Yes	No
2007	Conchita	"Tres Segundos"	Yes	Yes	Yes
2002	Coti	"Antes que ver el sol"	Yes	Yes	No
1988	Danza Invisible	"Sabor de amor"	Yes	Yes	Yes
1989	Dinamita Pa Los Pollos	"Purita Dinamita"	Yes	Yes	Yes
1986	Duncan Dhu	"Cien Gaviotas"	Yes	Yes	Yes
1987	Duncan Dhu	"En Algún Lugar"	Yes	Yes	Yes
1961	Duo Dinamico	"Quisiera Ser"	Yes	Yes	Yes
2006	Edurne	"Amores dormidos"	Yes	Yes	Yes
1980	Ejecutivos Agresivos	"Mari Pili"	Yes	Yes	Yes
2004	El Arrebato	"Búscate Un Hombre Que Te Quiera"	Yes	Yes	No
2008	El Arrebato	"Dame Cari?o"	Yes	Yes	Yes
2006	El Arrebato	"Duele"	Yes	Yes	Yes
2007	El Barrio	"Pa’ Madrid"	Yes	Yes	Yes
2006	El canto del loco	"Besos"	Yes	Yes	No
1996	El Fary	"El Toro Guapo"	Yes	Yes	Yes
2007	El sueño de Morfeo	"Para toda la vida"	Yes	Yes	Yes
1996	Ella Baila Sola	"Amores De Barra "	Yes	Yes	Yes
1996	Ella Baila Sola	"Cuando Los Sapos Bailen Flamenco"	Yes	Yes	Yes
1996	Ella Baila Sola	"Lo Echamos A Suertes"	Yes	Yes	Yes
2004	Estopa	"Tragicomedia"	Yes	Yes	Yes
1999	Estopa	"Como Camarón"	Yes	Yes	Yes
1996	Extremoduro	"So Payaso"	Yes	Yes	No
2004	Fangoria	"Retorciendo Palabras"	Yes	Yes	Yes
2003	Fito y Fitipaldis	"La Casa Por El Tejado"	Yes	Yes	No
2003	Fran Perea	"Uno Más Uno Son Siete"	Yes	Yes	Yes
1986	Gabinete Caligari	"El Calor Del Amor En Un Bar"	Yes	Yes	No
2004	Gabinete Caligari	"La Culpa Fue Del Cha-Cha-Chá"	Yes	Yes	Yes
2003	Gloria Estefan	"Hoy"	Yes	Yes	Yes
1990	La Guardia	"Cuando Brille El Sol"	Yes	Yes	Yes
2003	Hamlet	"Antes Y Después"	Yes	Yes	Yes
1995	Héroes Del Silencio	"Iberia Sumergida"	Yes	Yes	No
1995	Héroes Del Silencio	"La Chispa Adecuada"	Yes	Yes	
1993	Héroes del Silencio	"La Herida"	Yes	Yes	Yes
1990	Héroes Del Silencio	"Maldito Duende"	Yes	Yes	Yes
1988	Héroes Del Silencio	"Mar adentro"	Yes	Yes	Yes
1985	Hombres G	"Devuélveme A Mi Chica"	Yes	Yes	No
2002	Hombres G	"Lo Noto"	Yes	Yes	Yes
2003	Hombres G	"No Te Escaparás"	Yes	Yes	No
2009	Ilsa	"La Sonrisa De La Luna"	Yes	Yes	Yes
2005	Iván Ferreiro	"Turnedo"	Yes	Yes	Yes
1998	Jarabe de Palo	"Depende"	Yes	Yes	No
1996	Jarabe de Palo	"La Flaca"	Yes	Yes	Yes
2002	Jarabe de Palo	"Yin Yang"	Yes	Yes	Yes
1971	Jeanette	"Soy Rebelde"	Yes	Yes	Yes
1994	Joaquín Sabina	"El Blues De Lo Que Pasa En Mi Escalera"	Yes	Yes	No
1979	Jose Luis Perales	"Un Velero Llamado Libertad"	Yes	Yes	Yes
1996	Karina	"El Baúl De Los Recuerdos"	Yes	Yes	Yes
2006	Kiko Y Shara	"Puede Ser"	Yes	Yes	Yes
2010	Kiko Y Shara	"Y yo queria"	Yes	Yes	Yes
2008	La Oreja De Van Gogh	"Inmortal"	Yes	Yes	Yes
2009	Labuat	"Soy Tu Aire"	Yes	Yes	Yes
1983	Loquillo y Trogloditas	"Cadillac Solitario"	Yes	Yes	No
1989	Loquillo y Trogloditas	"El Rompeolas"	Yes	Yes	Yes
1983	Loquillo y Trogloditas	"Ritmo De Garaje"	Yes	Yes	Yes
1978	Los Chunguitos	"¡Ay! Que Dolor"	Yes	Yes	Yes
2006	Los Delinquentes Y Bebe	"Después"	Yes	Yes	Yes
2014	Los Payos	"María Isabel"	Yes	Yes	Yes
2014	Los Secretos	"Déjame "	Yes	Yes	Unknown
2000	M Clan	"Carolina"	Yes	Yes	No
2004	M Clan	"Miedo"	Yes	Yes	Yes
2009	Macaco	"Tengo"	Yes	Yes	Yes
2003	Mago De Oz	"La Costa Del Silencio"	Yes	Yes	Yes
2001	Malú	"Toda"	Yes	Yes	Yes
1993	Marta Sanchez	"Desperada"	Yes	Yes	No
1992	Medina Azahara	"Necesito Respirar"	Yes	Yes	Yes
2007	Melendi	"Caminando Por La Vida"	Yes	Yes	Yes
2003	Melendi	"Con La Luna Llena"	Yes	Yes	No
2003	Melendi	"Con sólo una sonrisa"	Yes	Yes	No
2003	Melendi	"Hablando En Plata"	Yes	Yes	No
2006	Melendi	"Kisiera yo saber"	Yes	Yes	Yes
2007	Melocos	"Cada Golpe"	Yes	Yes	No
2007	Melocos	"Fuiste Tu"	Yes	Yes	No
2009	Melocos	"Somos"	Yes	Yes	Yes
2008	Melocos con Natalia Jimenez	"Cuando Me Vaya"	Yes	Yes	Yes
1999	Melon Diesel	"Contracorriente"	Yes	Yes	Yes
2007	Miguel Bosé	"Morenamía"	Yes	Yes	No
1990	Miguel Bosé con Rafa Sánchez	"Manos vacías"	Yes	Yes	No
2003	Mikel Erentxun	"Mañana"	Yes	Yes	Yes
2004	Mürfila	"Loko"	Yes	Yes	No
2002	Natalia Lafourcade	"En El 2000"	Yes	Yes	Yes
1995	Navajita Plateá	"Frío Sin Ti"	Yes	Yes	Yes
1993	Navajita Plateá	"Noches de Bohemia"	Yes	Yes	Yes
2006	Nena Daconte	"En Qué Estrella Estar?"	Yes	Yes	Unknown
1985	Los Nikis	"El Imperio Contraataca"	Yes	Yes	Yes
2002	Niña Pastori	"De boca en boca"	Yes	Yes	Yes
2003	Las Niñas	"Ojú!"	Yes	Yes	Yes
2003	La Oreja de Van Gogh	"20 De Enero"	Yes	Yes	Yes
2006	La Oreja de Van Gogh	"Dulce Locura"	Yes	Yes	Yes
2006	La Oreja de Van Gogh	"Muñeca de trapo"	Yes	Yes	Yes
2003	La Oreja de Van Gogh	"Puedes Contar Conmigo"	Yes	Yes	Yes
2003	La Oreja de Van Gogh	"Rosas"	Yes	Yes	Yes
1981	Paloma San Basilio	"Juntos"	Yes	Yes	Yes
1999	Pastora Soler	"Dámelo Ya"	Yes	Yes	No
2001	Patricia Manterola	"Que el ritmo no pare"	Yes	Yes	Yes
2003	Pereza	"Pienso En Aquella Tarde"	Yes	Yes	Yes
1995	Los Piratas	"Promesas Que No Valen Nada"	Yes	Yes	Yes
2006	Presuntos Implicados	"Cómo Hemos Cambiado"	Yes	Yes	Yes
1982	Raffaella Carrà	"Que Dolor"	Yes	Yes	Yes
1998	Los Rebeldes	"Mediterráneo"	Yes	Yes	No
1992	Revólver	"Si Es Tan Sólo Amor"	Yes	Yes	Yes
1981	Rocio Jurado	"Como Una Ola"	Yes	Yes	Yes
1989	Los Ronaldos	"Adiós Papá"	Yes	Yes	Yes
1992	Rosario	"Mi Gato"	Yes	Yes	Yes
1998	Rosendo	"Vaya Ejemplar De Primavera"	Yes	Yes	Yes
2003	Roser	"Quiero Besarte"	Yes	Yes	Yes
1997	Saratoga	"Perro Traidor"	Yes	Yes	Yes
1994	Seguridad Social	"Chiquilla"	Yes	Yes	Yes
1993	Seguridad Social	"Quiero Tener Tu Presencia"	Yes	Yes	No
2007	Sidonie	"Los Olvidados"	Yes	Yes	Yes
2005	Las Supremas de Móstoles	"Eres Un Enfermo"	Yes	Yes	Yes
1999	Tam Tam Go	"Atrapados en la red"	Yes	Yes	Yes
1990	Tam Tam Go	"Espaldas Mojadas"	Yes	Yes	Yes
1988	Tam Tam Go	"Manuel Raquel"	Yes	Yes	Yes
1983	Tino Casal	"Embrujada"	Yes	Yes	Yes
2009	Zahara	"Merezco"	Yes	Yes	No
2009	Zenttric	"Solo Quiero Bailar"	Yes	Yes	Yes
1980	Zombies	"Groenlandia"	Yes	Yes	Yes

=== Swedish ===
Year	Artist	Title	SE	UK	US
2004	After Dark	"La Dolce Vita"	Yes	Yes	No
1986	Anna Book	"ABC"	Yes	Yes	Yes
1986	Arja Saijonmaa	"Högt över havet"	Yes	Yes	Yes
2002	Barbados	"Världen utanför"	Yes	Yes	Yes
2006	Basshunter	"Boten Anna"	Yes	Yes	Yes
2002	Brandsta City Släckers	"Kom och ta mig"	Yes	Yes	Yes
1991	Carola	"Fångad av en stormvind"	Yes	Yes	Yes
2006	Elias feat. Frans	"Who's da Man"	Yes	Yes	No
1981	Freestyle	"Fantasi"	Yes	Yes	Yes
1984	Herreys	"Diggi-Loo Diggi-Ley"	?	Yes	?
1995	Jan Johansen	"Se på mig"	Yes	Yes	Yes
2004	Johnny Deluxe feat. Anna Nordell	"Drömmer jag?"	?	Yes	?
1996	Kent	"Kräm (så nära får ingen gå)"	Yes	Yes	?
1996	Kent	"Om du var här"	Yes	Yes	?
2002	Kikki, Bettan & Lotta	"Vem é dé du vill ha"	Yes	Yes	Yes
2008	Kristian Anttila	"Vill ha dig"	Yes	Yes	No
1986	Lasse Holm & Monica Törnell	"É dé det här du kallar kärlek?"	Yes	Yes	Yes
2004	Lena Philipsson	"Det gör ont"	Yes	Yes	Yes
1992	Lisa Nilsson	"Himlen runt hörnet"	Yes	Yes	Yes
2007	Magnus Uggla	"För kung och fosterland"	Yes	Yes	Yes
2004	Magnus Uggla	"Värsta grymma tjejen"	Yes	Yes	Yes
2006	Marit Bergman	"No Party"	Yes	Yes	Yes
1988	Mauro Scocco	"Sarah"	Yes	Yes	Yes
1999	Patrik Isaksson	"Du får göra som du vill"	Yes	Yes	Yes
1999	Patrik Isaksson	"Hos dig är jag underbar"	Yes	Yes	Yes
2006	Petter Askergren	"Det går bra nu"	Yes	Yes	No
1987	Ratata & Frida	"Så länge vi har varann"	Yes	Yes	Yes
2000	Roger Pontare	"När vindarna viskar mitt namn"	Yes	Yes	Yes
2008	Sanna Nielsen	"Empty Room"	Yes	Yes	Yes
2004	Shirley Clamp	"Min kärlek"	Yes	Yes	Yes
2007	Sonja Aldén	"För att du finns"	Yes	Yes	Yes
1989	Tommy Nilsson	"En dag"	Yes	Yes	No
