= Astrid North =

German soul singer-songwriter (1973–2019)

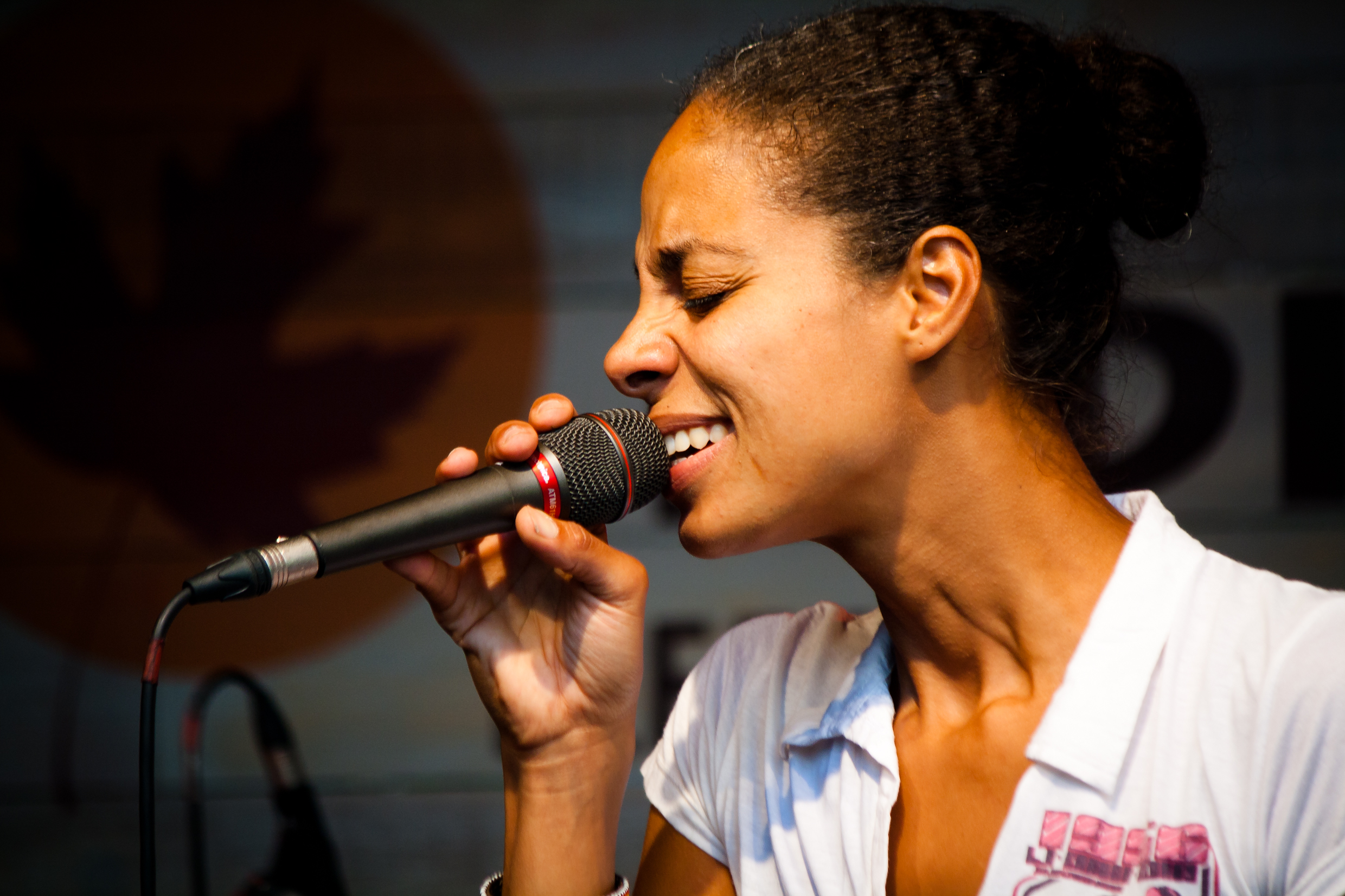
- 2012 in Hamburg

Background information
- Also known as: Astrid North
- Born: Astrid Karina North Radmann; 24 August 1973; West Berlin, West Germany
- Origin: Berlin
- Died: 25 June 2019 (aged 45) Berlin, Germany
- Genres: Soul
- Occupations: Singer, songwriter, lecturer
- Instrument: piano
- Years active: 1992–2019
- Labels: Astrid North Records
- Website: AstridNorth.com

Astrid North (Astrid Karina North Radmann; 24 August 1973, West Berlin – 25 June 2019, Berlin) was a German soul singer and songwriter. She was the singer of the German band Cultured Pearls, with whom she released five Albums. As guest singer of the band Soulounge she published three albums.

== Career ==
North had her first experiences as a singer with her student band Colorful Dimension in Berlin. In March 1992, she met B. La (Bela Braukmann) and Tex Super (Peter Hinderthür) who then studied at the Hochschule für Musik und Theater Hamburg and who were looking for a singer for their band Cultured Pearls. The trio entered the German charts with four singles and four albums.

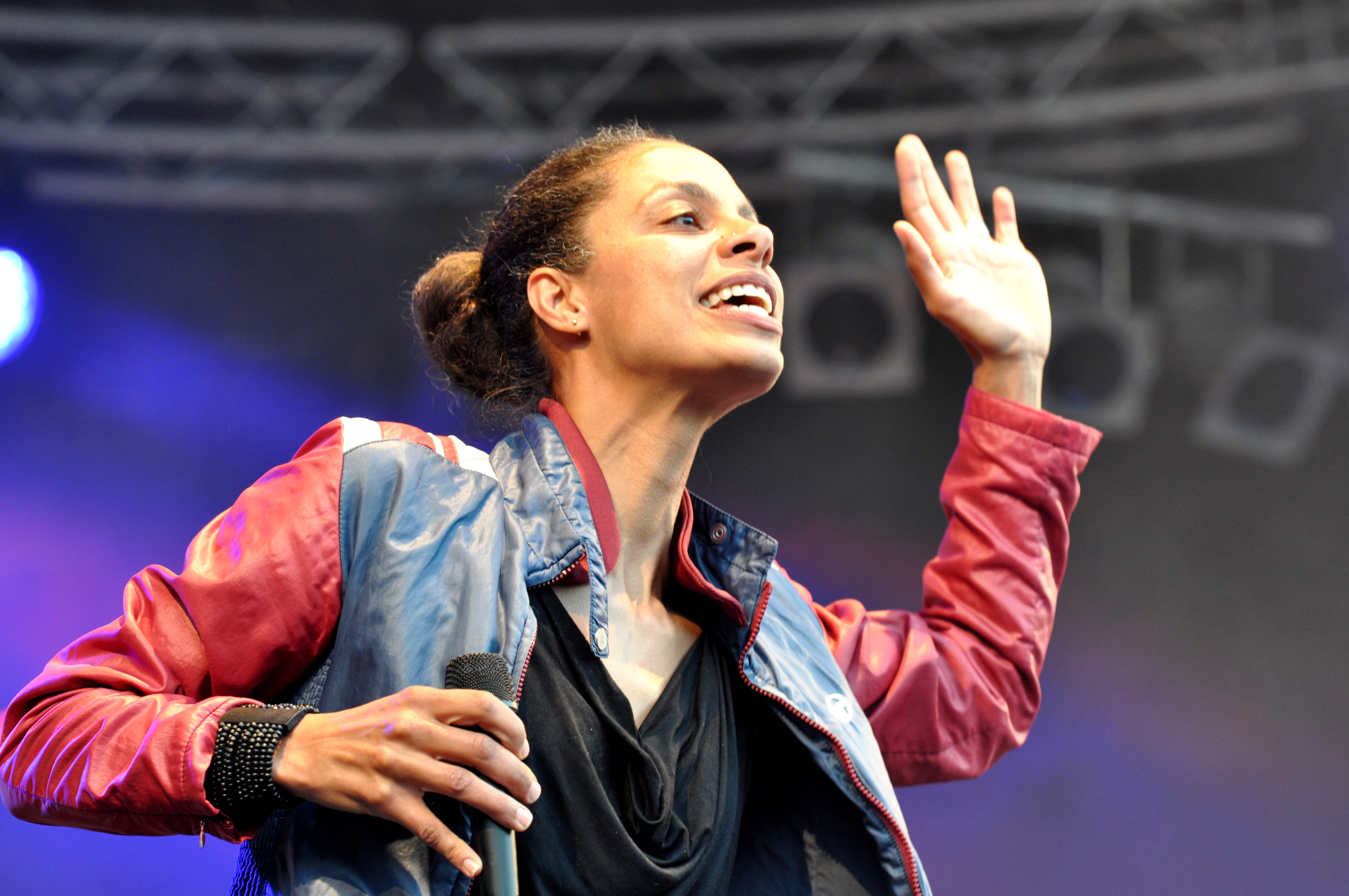
2015 at Bardentreffen in Nürnberg

In 1994 North sang for the dance-pop band Big Light on their hit single Trouble Is. In 1996 she was a guest on the side project Little Red Riding Hood by Fury in the Slaughterhouse brothers Kai and Thorsten Wingenfelder which resulted in the release of the single Life's Too Short from the eponymous album.

The song Sleepy Eyes, texted and sung by North, appears in the soundtrack of the movie Tor zum Himmel (2003) by director Veit Helmer. In 2003 she appeared at the festival Das Fest in Karlsruhe and sang alongside her own songs a cover version of the Aerosmith hit Walk This Way together with the German singer Sasha. North also toured with the American singer Gabriel Gordon.

After the end of her band Cultured Pearls in 2003 North moved 2004 to New York City to write new songs, work with a number of different musicians and to experiment with her music.

In 2005 she joined the charity project Home, which produced an album for the benefit of the orphans from the Beluga School for Life in Thailand which have been affected by the Indian Ocean earthquake in 2004 and the subsequent tsunami. Beside the orphans themselves also the following artists have been involved, guitarist Henning Rümenapp (Guano Apes), Kai Wingenfelder (Fury in the Slaughterhouse), Maya Saban and others. With Bobby Hebb Astrid North recorded a new version of his classic hit Sunny. It was the first time Hebb sung this song as duett and it appeared on his last album That's All I Wanna Know.

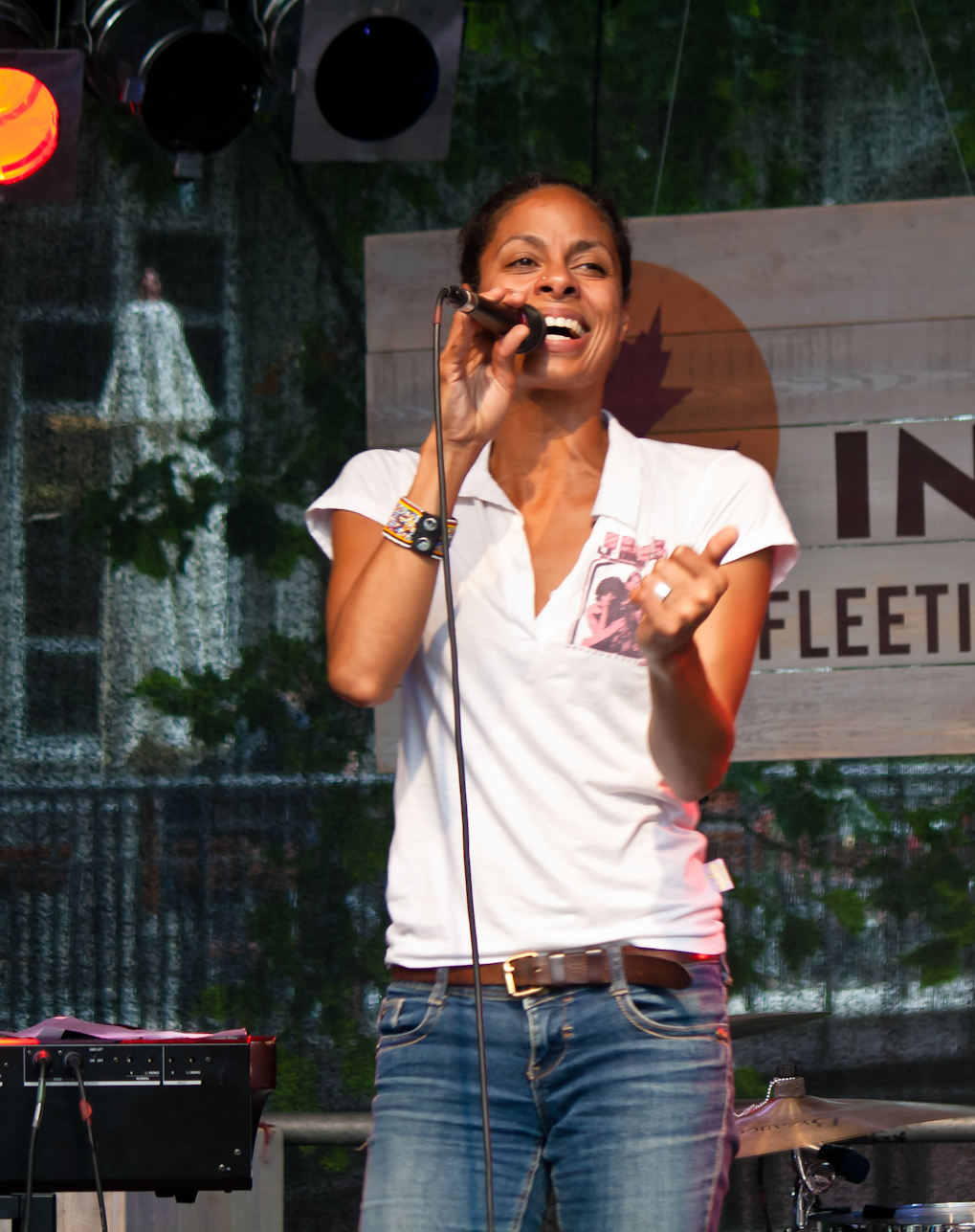
Indian Summer Festival, Fleetinsel in Hamburg 2012

North sang in 2006 My Ride, Spring Is Near and No One Can Tell on the album The Ride by Basic Jazz Lounge, a project by jazz trumpeter Joo Kraus. In addition, she worked as a workshop lecturer of the Popkurs at the Hochschule für Musik und Theater Hamburg.

In spring 2010 North performed as the opening act of the Fakebling-Tour of Miss Platnum. The magazine Der Spiegel described her as one of the "leading ladies of the local soul scene". On 20 July 2012 her solo debut album North was released.

On 16 September 2016 Astrid North released her second solo album, Precious Ruby, dedicated to her grandmother Precious Ruby North. North used crowdfunding to finance the album. The first single published from this album was the song Miss Lucy. In 2016 she also started her concert series North-Lichter in Berlin's Bar jeder Vernunft to which she invited singers such as Katharina Franck, Elke Brauweiler, Lizzy Scharnofske, Mia Diekow, Lisa Bassenge or Iris Romen.

== Life ==
Astrid North was born in West Berlin, West Germany to Sondria North and Wolf-Dieter Radmann. She commuted between her birth city and her family in Houston, Texas until she was nine years old. In the USA she lived mainly with her grandparents and her time there significantly shaped her musical development.

Besides her music career Astrid North worked also as lecturer in Hamburg at the Hochschule für Musik und Theater and as yoga teacher. North was the mother of two children, her daughter was born in 2001 and her son in 2006. Her sister Ondria North works as make-up artist and hair stylist in the German film industry.

She died in June 2019 at the age of 45 years from pancreatic cancer.

== Discography ==
with Cultured Pearls
Albums

- 1996: Sing Dela Sing (German chart position 92, 3 weeks)
- 1997: Space Age Honeymoon (German chart position 54, 6 weeks)
- 1999: Liquefied Days (German chart position 19, 9 weeks)
- 2002: Life on a Tuesday (German chart position 74, 1 week)

Singles

- 1996: Tic Toc (1996) (German chart position 65, 10 weeks)
- 1997: Sugar Sugar Honey (German chart position 72, 9 weeks)
- 1998: Silverball (German chart position 99, 2 weeks)
- 1999: Kissing the Sheets (German chart position 87, 9 weeks)

with Soulounge

- 2003: The Essence of the Live Event – Volume One
- 2004: Home
- 2006: Say It All

Solo

- 2005: Sunny (Single, Bobby Hebb feat. Astrid North)
- 2012: North (Album, 20. Juli 2012)
- 2013: North Live (Album, live recordings from different venues in Germany)
- 2016: Sunny (Compilation, Bobby Hebb feat. Astrid North)
- 2016: Precious Ruby (Album, 16. September 2016)

as guest singer

- 1994: Trouble Is – Big Light (Single)
- 1996: Life's Too Short – Little Red Riding Hood (Single)
- 2006: Basic Jazz Lounge: The Ride – Joo Kraus (Album)
