= Hanseatic School for Life =

Childrens' charity in Thailand

The Hanseatic School for Life is a non-profit organization in Thailand that cares for children and adolescents in need. The Hanseatic School for Life pursues an educational concept on the basis of the "situational approach", which UNESCO classified as a "... much needed world-class innovative effort in the field of education" and a "new standard of educational excellence for the world community of the 21st century". Through family-like living and project-oriented learning, the children and adolescents gain skills which can give their life a positive direction. The intellectual father of the situational approach is the Berlin educationalist Prof. em. Dr. Jürgen Zimmer, who founded the International Academy for Innovative Pedagogy, Psychology and Economics gGmbH (INA) at the Free University Berlin.

== History ==
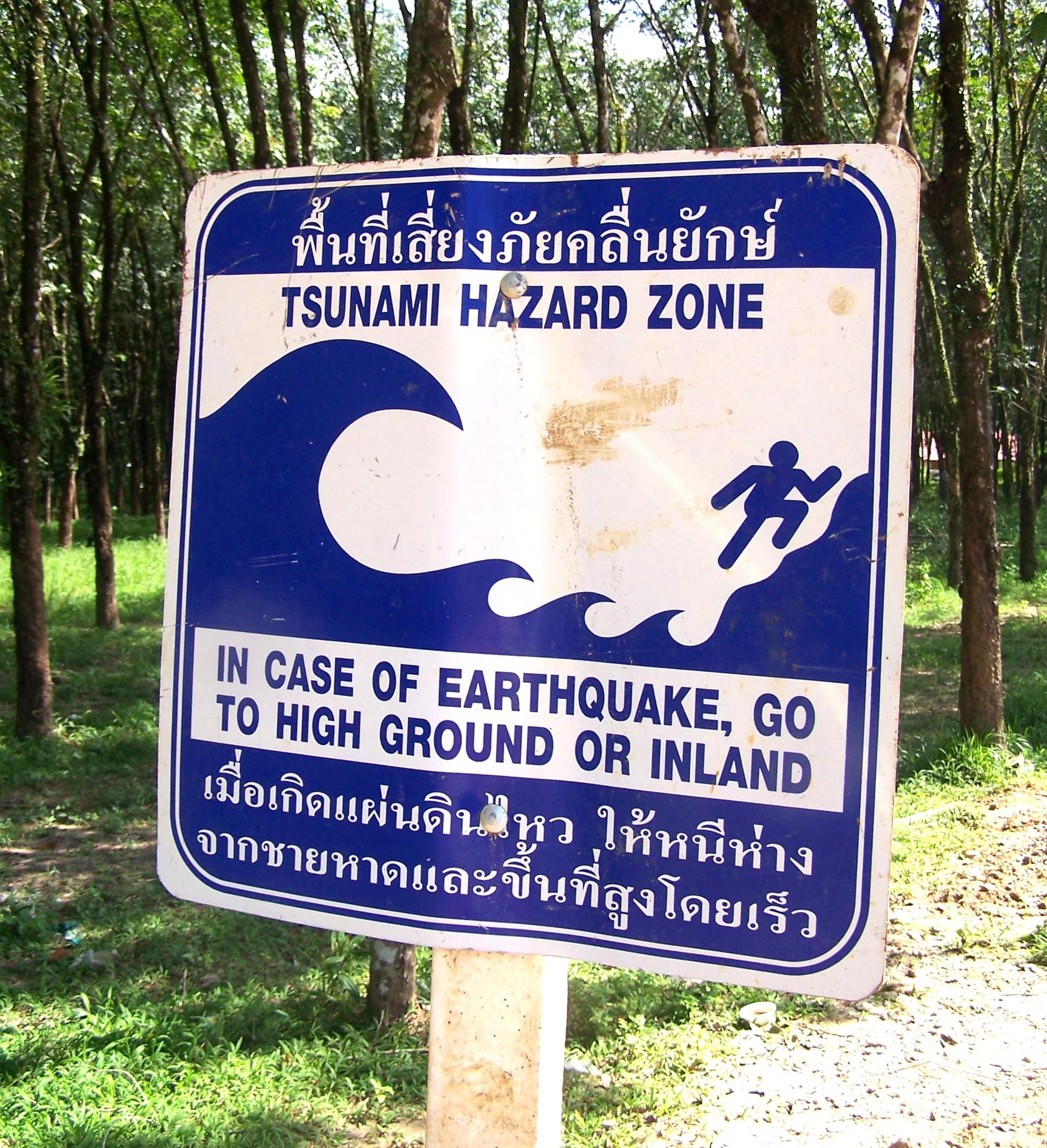
Tsunami warning sign in Khao Lak

Hanseatic School for Life, formerly Beluga School for Life, in Na Nai ("village in a rice field") near Khao Lak in the south of Thailand was founded by Niels Stolberg and inaugurated in October 2006. The aim was to help the children in Thailand who had lost their parents due to the tsunami in the Indian Ocean on December 26, 2004. Thailand was among the regions most affected by the natural disaster.

The children live in family-like structures, similar to those of the worldwide SOS Children's Villages. Education takes place in "Learning Centers" on the premises. The focus of the school is no longer exclusively aimed at the victims of the 2004 tsunami catastrophe, but also at local children and adolescents in need.

The former premises of a coconut plantation in the heartland of Thailand have been continuously developed since the opening of the school. Currently, 150 children and adolescents live in the newly built village. The age of the children ranges from infancy through adolescence. The Hanseatic School for Life is open to the public, and since 2007 it has also been possible to temporarily live on the premises as a visitor.

The first School for Life following the concept of Professor em. Dr. Jürgen Zimmer was founded in 2003 in the north of Thailand, near the provincial capital Chiang Mai. This facility focused on AIDS orphans, as AIDS had caused the death of many parents in the region and left children in utmost poverty.

The School for Life near Chiang Mai is located a 45-minute drive away from the provincial capital on the farm "Suan Suo Fha Sai", which in English means "clear skies over beautiful gardens". Today the school cares for and teaches more than 120 orphans.

== Activity ==
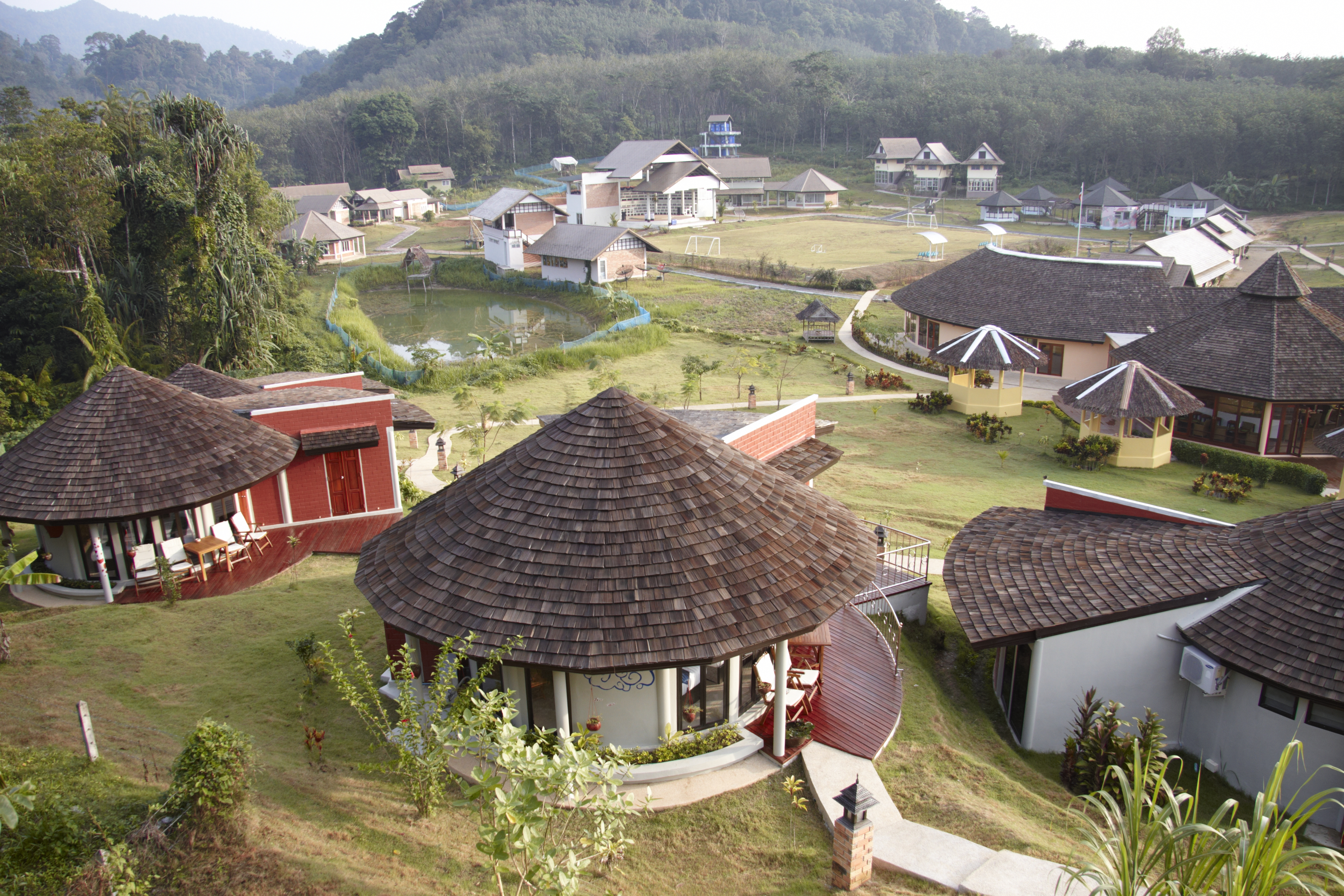
Partial overview of the Beluga School for Life campus

The objective of the Hanseatic School for Life, and a distinguishing feature compared to similar aid projects, is the orientation towards the transfer of practical skills which allow the students to set up their own business in the future and thus to even create new jobs. The concept is based on the idea of "helping people to help themselves", and aims at lastingly reducing poverty.

The guest area of the village, the Hotel Training Institute, serves as a learning center. At the institute, school graduates learn how to cater to vacationers and qualify for employment in the hotel business during a one-year training course. Six subject areas are offered:

- Organic farming
- Culture sensitive tourism
- Nutrition and health
- Body and soul
- Cultural heritage and development
- International communication

The organization of the school and the education on-site are the responsibility of a total of 60 employees. Five of them are German nationals, the rest are from Thailand.

== Financing ==
The Hanseatic School for Life primarily finances itself by means of donations and sponsorships. Legally the Hanseatic School for Life is operated by the charitable Hanseatic School for Life gGmbH. In October 2005, Thai Beluga S.L. Ltd. was founded, which acts as owner of the premises and buildings. The plan for the near future is that the project will be able to largely finance itself on the basis of proceeds from "culture sensitive tourism" at the Beluga School for Life, which began in 2007. As guests of the Hanseatic School for Life, culturally interested vacationers receive insights into life in Southeast Asia on equal footing with the Thai residents. To this end, guest bungalows have been erected on the premises.

== Awards ==
On September 30, 2007, the Hanseatic School for Life was selected by the initiative "Germany – Land of Ideas" as a "Landmark in the Land of Ideas". In November 2008, the Hanseatic School for Life received a personal award from Willi Lemke, UN Special Adviser to the Secretary-General on Sport for Development and Peace.

== Sponsors ==
Sports, art and entertainment celebrities act as ambassadors for and sponsors of the Hanseatic School for Life: The HOME band, composed of eight German pop musicians, has recorded a CD in support of the Hanseatic School for Life. The band consists of organizer, vocalist and documentary director Kai Wingenfelder (former member of the band "Fury In The Slaughterhouse"), producer Jens Krause, vocalist Thomas Hanreich ("Vivid"), the artists Astrid North ("Cultured Pearls") and Maya Saban, both vocalists as well; Stephan Eggert ("Selig") on the drums, bass player Stephan Gade ("The Land"), keyboarder Gunter Papperitz ("Soulounge"), as well as guitarist Henning Rümenapp ("Guano Apes"). The band has released the album "HOME" as well as the single "No Place Like Home". The album also contains a documentary DVD about the recordings on-site.

Following the motto "HOME meets Classic” the band played two concerts in support of the Beluga School for Life together with the Bremen Philharmonic Orchestra. The concerts took place in October 2008 at the Staatstheater Oldenburg and Die Glocke in Bremen.

The German soccer and Bundesliga club Werder Bremen is involved with the Hanseatic School for Life. Other ambassadors are Katharina Wagner, Director of the Bayreuther Festspiele, the actress Susanne Gärtner, TV presenter and journalist Miriam Pielhau, the UN Special Advisor on Sport in the Service of Development and Peace, Willi Lemke, Lutz Stratmann, Minister for Science and Culture in Lower Saxony, as well as Prof. Dr. Bernd Stecker from the Bremen University of Applied Sciences.

== Criticism ==
The Hanseatic School for Life uses on its website, the words "We are a UNESCO project school". According to Volker Hörold, coordinator of the UNESCO-school network, the use of this information is prohibited in this form. In addition, it is not awarded the German DZI seal, which certifies the proper use of donations. The shipowner Niels Stolberg, founder of the predecessor of the Hanseatic School for Life is, according to prosecutor Frank Passade, embezzling donations of school.
