= Das was wir sind =

Single by Mondscheiner

from the album Diese Stadt
- Released: 7 July 2006
- Genre: Rock
- Length: 3:58 (Single Edition)
- Label: Sony BMG

Mondscheiner singles chronology
"Das was wir sind" (2006)	"Mittendrin" (2007)

"Das was wir sind" is the debut single from the album Diese Stadt, by the Austrian band Mondscheiner. It was released on 7 July 2006 and reached #10 on the Austrian charts.

== Track list ==
1. "Das was wir sind"
2. "Romeo und Julia"
3. "Tagebuch eines Dichters"
4. "Schön ist die Welt"

== Chart performance ==
=== Weekly charts ===
Chart (2006–07)	Peak position
Austria (Ö3 Austria Top 40)	10

=== Year-end charts ===
Chart (2007)	Position
Austria (Ö3 Austria Top 40)	54
