= Cosmo Klein =

German singer and songwriter (born 1978)

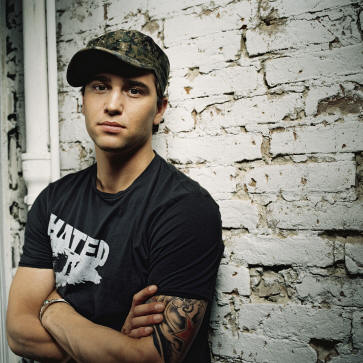
- Cosmo Klein

Background information
- Born: 1 November 1978 (age 46)
- Origin: Lippstadt, North Rhine-Westphalia, Germany
- Genres: Rock, Pop, House, Electronic
- Occupation(s): Singer, songwriter, producer
- Years active: 2003–present
- Labels: Warner Music, 105 Music, Weplay Music, Armada, Pacha Rec., Zouke Rec., Ultra Rec, Vidisco, Cosmopolytix
- Website: cosmoklein.de

Cosmo Klein (born Marcus Klein on 1 November 1978) is a German singer and songwriter.

== Biography ==
Cosmo Klein was born in Lippstadt, Germany. At the age of ten, he and his parents moved to Texas, where he expanded his interest in music and started playing the guitar. Three years later, the family returned home after the end of his father's deployment in El Paso.

Back in (Germany), Klein decided to leave high school before graduating, instead founding his own event agency, Smartcorehotel. By a fortunate coincidence he was introduced to singer Sasha, who engaged Klein to write for his second album and helped him to sign a contract with Warner Music.

As a result, Klein released his bilingual debut album, This Is My Time, in 2003. The CD spawned three singles, including the radio hits "All I Ever Need" and "Baby Don't Cry". Afterwards, he teamed up with newcomer Maya Saban for their duet "Das Alles Ändert Nichts Daran". The song managed to peak at number 11 on the German singles charts and became Klein's biggest chart success to date.

Klein's second album, Human, was released in August 2006. The album spawned two singles: "Nothing to Lose" and "I Love You".

The 2008 song "Beautiful Lie", a cooperation with Keemo and Tim Royko, became a No. 1 Hit in Portugal and Brazil.

Teaming up with Syke n Sugarstarr and DBN from Hamburg in 2010, Klein reached the dance charts in several countries, including Britain, Spain, Austria, France, staying at No. 1 for several weeks in Germany with "My Belief".

In 2013, Klein teamed up with 8th Note from Israel and their partner Nilson from the Netherlands, on "Too good to be true".

== Discography ==
=== Albums ===
- This Is My Time (2003)
- Human (2006)
- Let's Work (The Phunkguerilla & Cosmo Klein) (2013) / Cosmopolytix

=== Singles ===
- 2003: "All I Ever Need"
- 2003: "Baby Don't Cry"
- 2004: "Addicted"
- 2005: "Das Alles Ändert Nichts Daran" (with Maya Saban)
- 2006: "Nothing to Lose"
- 2006: "I Love You"
- 2008: Beautiful Lie – Keemo & Tim Royko feat. Cosmo Klein (Alphabet city/ Kontor)
- 2010: My Belief – Syke n Sugarstarr feat. Cosmo Klein (Weplay Rec.)
- 2010: Sexual Insanity – Tim Royko feat. Cosmo Klein (Pacha Rec.)
- 2011: Feel Alive – Jean Elan feat. Cosmo Klein (Weplay Rec.)
- 2011: No Satisfaction – Syke n Sugarstarr feat. Cosmo Klein
- 2012: By Tonight – Cosmo Klein
- 2012: Gimme some love – Mark Bale feat. Cosmo Klein (Weplay Rec.)
- 2012: All About Us – Jean Elan & Cosmo Klein
- 2013: Pray Now! – The Phunkguerilla & Cosmo Klein (Cosmopolytix)
- 2013: Too good to be True – The 8th Note & Nilson feat. Cosmo Klein
- 2013: Big City Nights – Cosmo Klein & Tim Royko (Cosmopolytix)
