= Diese Stadt =

Studio album by Mondscheiner
- Released: September 2006 (rerelease:May 2007)
- Recorded: 2006
- Genre: Pop/rock
- Label: Sony BMG

Mondscheiner chronology
La belle captive (2004)	Diese Stadt (2006)

Diese Stadt is Mondscheiner's second album.

== Background information ==
After their album La belle captive and their Extended Play Die Kunst der Verführung, which were not so successful, Mondscheiner signed a contract with Sony BMG, they recorded a new album and their first single. It took six months to get into the Austrian Top 40 charts.

== Tracks ==
1. Das was wir sind
2. Heitere Gelassenheit
3. Dieser Tag
4. Anwendung der Aufrichtigkeit
5. Durcheinander
6. Was ich sehe
7. Tanzen
8. Romeo und Julia
9. Penelope
10. Schön ist die Welt
11. Ich kann nicht reden
12. Ende der Zeit

Bonus:

- Mittendrin
