= Laith Al-Deen =

German singer

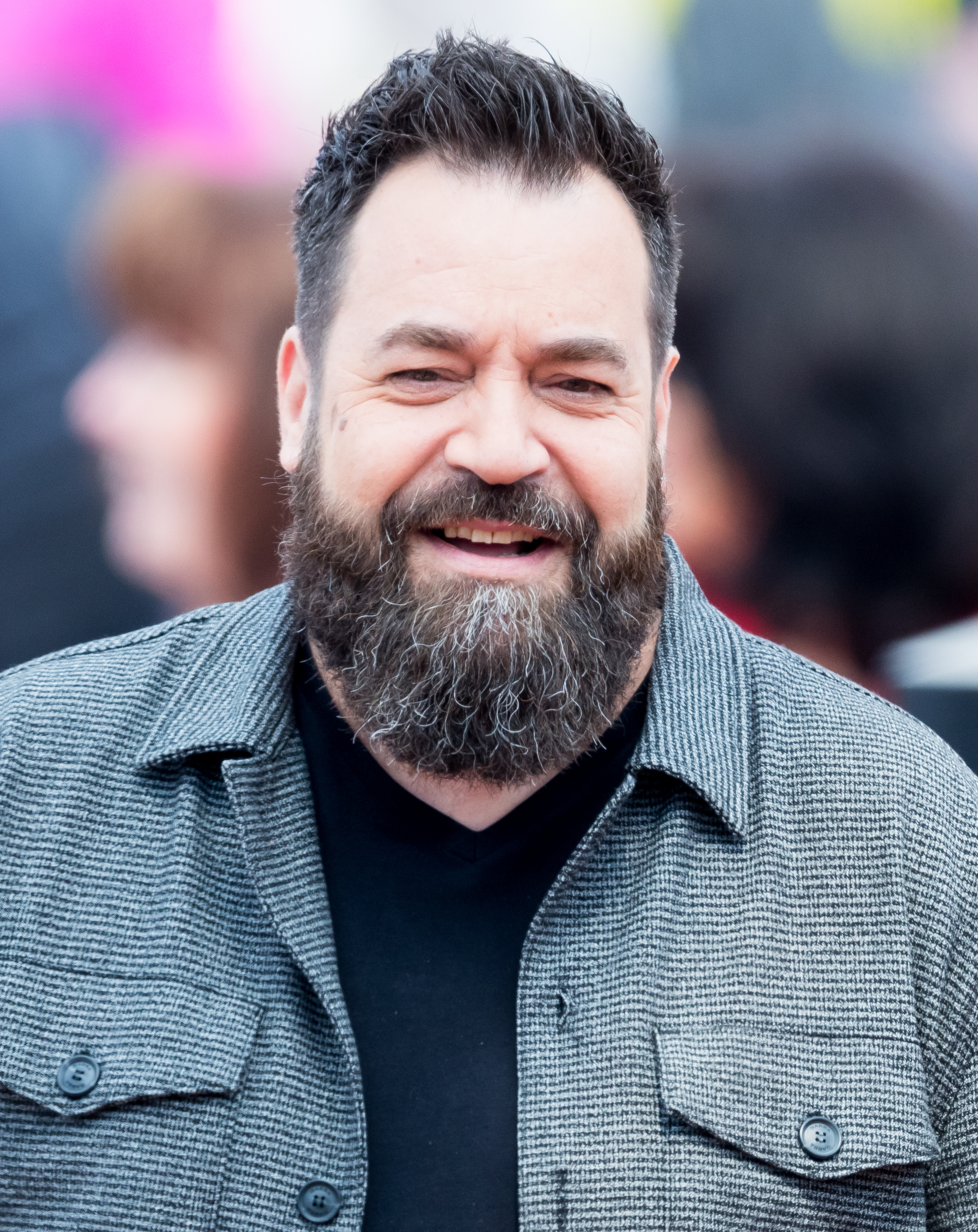
Laith Al-Deen in 2024

Laith Al-Deen (born 20 February 1972) is a German pop singer.

== Biography ==
Born to an Iraqi father and German mother in Karlsruhe, Laith grew up in the United States and Mannheim, West Germany. He achieved first fame with his debut album, Ich will nur wissen (English: I Only Want to Know), from which came his first two singles, Bilder von Dir (English: Pictures of you, German version of the 1995 hit Everlasting Pictures of B-Zet with Darlesia) and Kleine Helden (English: Little Heroes). His second album, Melomanie, released in 2002, resulted in the singles Dein Lied (English: Your Song) and Jetzt, Hier, Immer (English: Now, Here, Always), and was just as successful as his debut album. Laith was also nominated for the Comet, a music award given by the German broadcaster VIVA in the category of Hip hop/R&B, which he declined, saying that he would only seek recognition for German-language music rather than an international award

At the beginning of 2004, Laith released the album Für Alle (English: For Everyone), which was seen a continuation of his previous musical style. The album reached the top spot on the German album charts and was Laith's greatest commercial success. The single taken from Für Alle, Alles an dir (English: Everything About You), reached #21 on the German charts, the highest position for one of Laith's singles up to that point. The second single taken from the album, Höher (English: Higher) was one of the finalists for Germany in the Eurovision Song Contest 2004. In the fall of 2004, Laith produced a live album, which performed well on the German charts for several weeks. In September 2005 a DualDisc of this live album was released, with the entire album rerecorded in 5.1 surround sound. In June 2007 a new album, Die Liebe zum Detail (English: The Love For Detail) and a new single, Keine wie du (English: No One Like You), were released. The album reached #3 on the German charts, and Keine wie du reached sixteenth position on the German singles charts.

== Discography ==
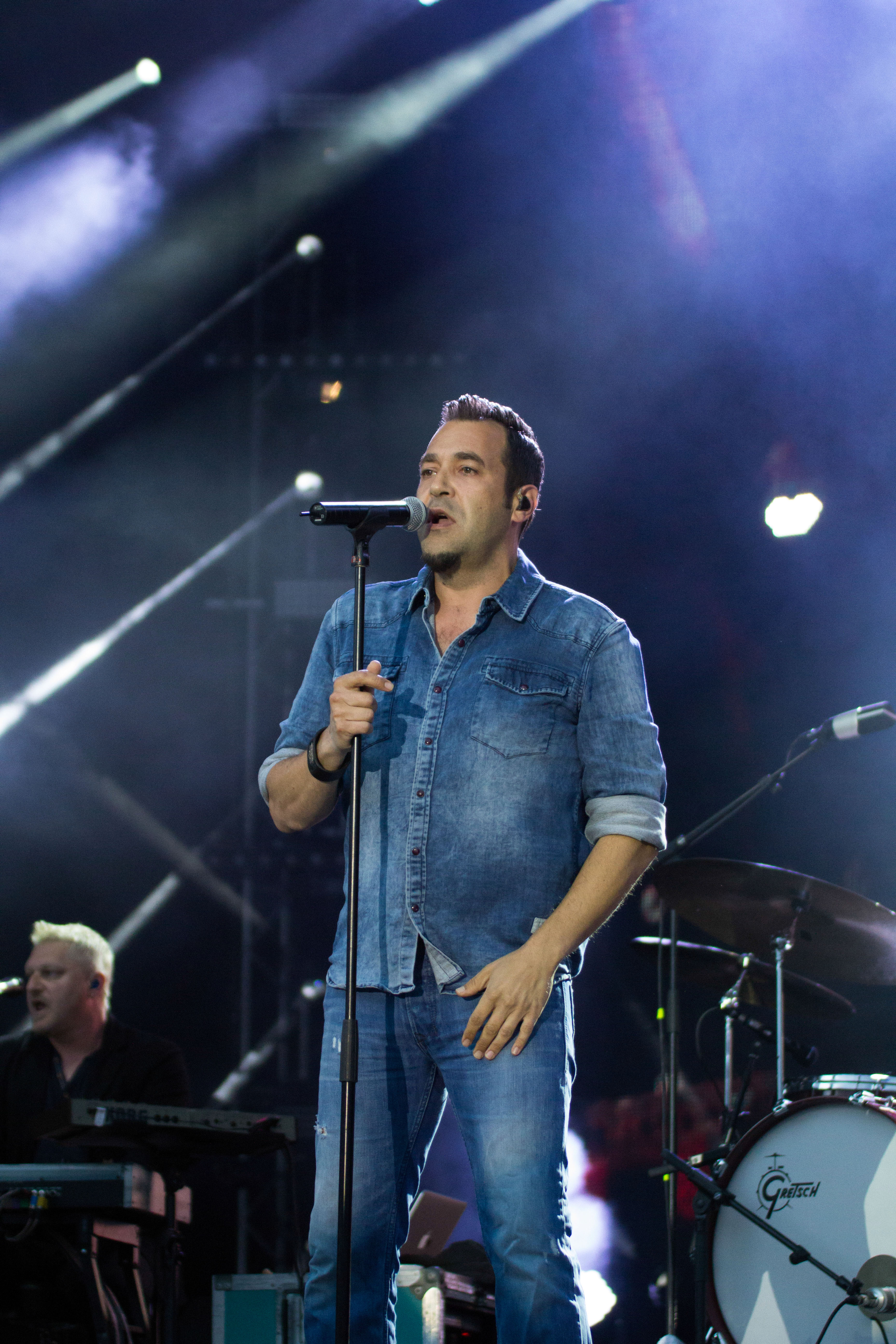
Laith Al-Deen performing in 2017

=== Albums ===
- 2000: Ich will nur wissen ...
- 2001: Ich will nur wissen ... (New-Edition)
- 2002: Melomanie
- 2004: Für Alle
- 2004: Live
- 2005: Die Frage wie
- 2007: Die Liebe zum Detail
- 2009: Session
- 2011: Der letzte deiner Art
- 2014: Was wenn alles gut geht
- 2016: Bleib unterwegs
- 2020: Kein Tag umsonst
- 2024: Dein Begleiter

=== Singles ===
- 2000: The Invitation (Ich will nur wissen)
- 2000: Bilder von dir
- 2000: Kleine Helden
- 2001: Noch lange nicht genug
- 2002: Dein Lied
- 2002: Jetzt, hier, immer
- 2003: Traurig
- 2003: Alles an dir
- 2004: Höher
- 2004: Meilenweit (featuring Zoe)
- 2005: Leb den Tag
- 2005: Warten und Schweigen (Download-Single)
- 2007: Keine wie du
- 2007: Es wird nicht leicht sein
- 2008: Du
- 2008: Wie soll das gehen?
- 2009: Evelin
- 2009: Lay Your Love on Me
- 2009: If I Ever Lose My Faith
- 2011: Sicher sein
- 2011: Wieder tun
- 2014: Was wenn alles gut geht
- 2014: Steine
- 2015: Nur wenn sie daenzt
- 2016: Geheimnis
- 2016: Bleib unterwegs
- 2017: Alles dreht sich
- 2024: Alles anders
- 2024: Dein Begleiter
