= Nessuno è solo =

2006 Tiziano Ferro album

Studio album by Tiziano Ferro
- Released: 23 June 2006 (Italy); 5 January 2007 (Turkey)
- Genre: Pop; R&B
- Length: 56:13
- Label: EMI
- Producer: Tiziano Ferro; Michele Canova

Tiziano Ferro chronology
111 (2003)	Nessuno è solo (2006)	Alla mia età (2008)

Singles from Nessuno è solo
- 1. "Stop! Dimentica" Released: 12 May 2006; 2. "Ed ero contentissimo" Released: 25 August 2006; 3. "Ti scatterò una foto" Released: 5 January 2007; 4. "E Raffaella è mia" Released: 18 May 2007; 5. "E fuori è buio" Released: 14 September 2007

Nessuno è solo (and its Spanish-language version Nadie está solo) is the third studio album released by Italian singer-songwriter Tiziano Ferro. The album was released in Italy on 23 June 2006 by EMI Italiana.

Nessuno è solo is preceded by the lead single "Stop! Dimentica", which became his third number one single in Italy. The album contains a duet with Italian singer Biagio Antonacci, "Baciano le donne" and a tribute to singer and TV presenter Raffaella Carrà ("E Raffaella è mia").

It is Ferro's first album in three years after 111 and the first to feature a more traditional pop sound, rather than the heavenly R&B-influenced predecessors. According to the Federazione Industria Musicale Italiana (FIMI), Nessuno è solo was the best-selling album of 2007 in Italy. To promote the album, Ferro embarked the Nessuno è solo Tour 2007, which lasted from January to August 2007.

The third single from the album, "Ti scatterò una foto", and the song "La paura che..." were included in the soundtrack of the movie Ho voglia di te, directed by Luis Prieto and based on the book with the same title by Federico Moccia.

== Track listing ==
Italian edition CD: 0724353655426 (jewelcase) – 0724353655426 (slidepack)
No.	Title	Writer(s)	Producer(s)	Length
1.	"Tarantola d'Africa"	Tiziano Ferro	Tiziano Ferro, Michele Canova	4:40
2.	"Ti scatterò una foto"	Ferro	Ferro, Canova	4:33
3.	"Ed ero contentissimo"	Ferro	Ferro, Canova	4:13
4.	"Stop! Dimentica"	Ferro	Ferro, Canova	3:49
5.	"E fuori è buio"	Ferro, Diana Tejera	Ferro, Canova	3:43
6.	"Salutandotiaffogo"	Ferro	Ferro, Canova	3:43
7.	"E Raffaella è mia"	Ferro	Ferro, Canova	3:15
8.	"La paura che..."	Ferro	Ferro, Canova	4:00
9.	"Baciano le donne" (feat. Biagio Antonacci)	Ferro	Ferro, Canova	3:09
10.	"Già ti guarda Alice"	Ferro	Ferro, Canova	4:08
11.	"Mio fratello" (Silence starts at 4:50 mark and lasts until 13:50, where the hidden tracks "Il cielo" and "Gli occhi" appear, recorded by a young Ferro in 1987)	Ferro	Ferro, Canova	16:40

(Bonus CD+DVD) CD+DVD: 0094636809021
No.	Title	Length
1.	"Interview"
2.	"Stop! Dimentica" (Music video)
3.	"Stop! Olvídate" (Music video)
4.	"Making of the video"
5.	"Stop! Dimentica" (Studio PlayBack)
6.	"Stop! Olvídate" (Studio PlayBack)
7.	"Photo Gallery"

Nadie está solo (Spain) CD: 0094636887227
No.	Title	Writer(s)	Producer(s)	Length
1.	"Tarántula de África"	Ferro	Ferro, Canova	4:40
2.	"Te tomaré una foto"	Ferro	Ferro, Canova	4:33
3.	"Y estaba contentísimo"	Ferro	Ferro, Canova	4:13
4.	"Stop! Olvídate"	Ferro	Ferro, Canova	3:49
5.	"Y está oscuro"	Ferro, Tejera	Ferro, Canova	3:43
6.	"Despidiendoteahogo"	Ferro	Ferro, Canova	3:43
7.	"Y Raffaella es mía"	Ferro	Ferro, Canova	3:15
8.	"El miedo que..."	Ferro	Ferro, Canova	4:00
9.	"Baciano le donne" (feat. Biagio Antonacci)	Ferro	Ferro, Canova	3:09
10.	"Già ti guarda Alice"	Ferro	Ferro, Canova	4:08
11.	"Mio fratello"	Ferro	Ferro, Canova	4:55

Nadie está solo (Latin America and USA) CD:094636648927
No.	Title	Writer(s)	Producer(s)	Length
11.	"Mio fratello" (Silence starts at 4:50 mark and lasts until 13:40, where the hidden tracks "Il cielo" and "Gli occhi" appear, recorded by a young Ferro in 1987)	Ferro	Ferro, Canova	16:40
12.	"Mi credo" (feat. Pepe Aguilar)	Ferro	Ferro, Canova	5:03
13.	"Stop! Dimentica"	Ferro	Ferro, Canova	4:40

== Chart positions ==
=== Weekly charts ===
Chart (2006)	Peak position
Austrian Albums (Ö3 Austria)	6
Belgian Albums (Ultratop Flanders)	73
Belgian Albums (Ultratop Wallonia)	8
French Albums (SNEP)	166
German Albums (Offizielle Top 100)	44
Italian Albums (FIMI)	1
Mexican Albums (Top 100 Mexico)	14
Spanish Albums (Promusicae)	11
Swiss Albums (Schweizer Hitparade)	1
U.S Billboard Top Latin Albums	68

=== Year-end charts ===
Chart (2006)	Position
Austrian Albums Chart	46
Belgian Albums Chart (Wallonia)	79
Italian Albums Chart	7
Swiss Albums Chart	13
Chart (2007)	Position
Italian Albums Chart	1

== Certifications ==
Region	Certification	Certified units/sales
Italy (FIMI)	Diamond	400,000^{*}
Switzerland (IFPI Switzerland)	2× Platinum	60,000^{^}
Venezuela (APROFON)	Gold	5,000^{x}
^{*} Sales figures based on certification alone.^{^} Shipments figures based on certification alone.
