= E Raffaella è mia =

Single by Tiziano Ferro

from the album Nessuno è solo
- Released: 18 May 2007
- Recorded: 2006
- Genre: Disco-pop; Hi-NRG
- Length: 3:15
- Label: EMI
- Songwriter: Tiziano Ferro
- Producer: Michele Canova

Tiziano Ferro singles chronology
"Ti scatterò una foto" (2007)	"E Raffaella è mia" (2007)	"E fuori è buio" (2007)

"E Raffaella è mia" ("And Raffaella Is Mine") is a song by Italian singer-songwriter Tiziano Ferro. It was released on 18 May 2007 as the fourth single from his third studio album, Nessuno è solo. The single served as a tribute to the Italian recording artist Raffaella Carrà, who also appeared in the music video. The two performed the song at Ferro's concert at PalaLottomatica in a duet. The single was also released in Spain, where Carrà was particularly appreciated.

== Versions ==
1. "E Raffaella è mia"
2. "E Raffaella è mia (Paolo Aliberti Melodica Moody Edit Mix)"
3. "E Raffaella è mia (Paolo Aliberti Melodica Moody Mix)"
4. "E Raffaella è mia (Psychi Radio Remix)"
5. "Y Raffaella es mía" (Spanish language)

== Music video ==
The video begins with images of a fake music television program, vaguely reminiscent of the 60s, called Il mondo di Raffaella ("Raffaella's World"). The presenter of the show, played by Ferro, presents a 'young' singer (again Ferro) who sings the song. The video then cuts to a young male's home (again Ferro), who is watching the transmission enthusiastically. Midway though, the presenter reappears to announce the winner of a competition to spend an evening with Raffaella Carrà ("The lucky winner is: Ferro, Tiziano!"). The young viewer jumps up and down, whilst the door opens halfway to reveal Carrà. The video continues with Ferro singing the song and dancing with Carrà, whilst the viewer is at home playing with Carrà, in a surreal dreamlike atmosphere.

== Charts ==
Chart (2007)	Peak position
Italy (FIMI)	3

== Certifications ==
Region	Certification	Certified units/sales
Italy (FIMI)	Platinum	20,000^{*}
^{*} Sales figures based on certification alone.
