= Johnny Deluxe =

Danish band

- Origin: Denmark
- Genres: Rock, pop
- Years active: 2003–2012, 2015-present
- Label: Copenhagen Records
- Members: Noam Halby; Jakob S. Glæsner
- Past members: Morten Lynggaard; Søren Itenov
- Website: Official

Johnny Deluxe is a Danish music band. Formed in London by the lead singer Noam Halby, bassist Jakob S. Glæsner and guitarist Søren Itenov in 2000, the group was later joined by Morten Lynggaard in 2002.

== History ==
The band took part in KarriereKanonen run by Danish radio station P3 in 2003, and released the EP Elskovspony in November of the same year. In January 2004, the group signed a contract with Copenhagen Records and subsequently released their debut album, Johnny Deluxe on 24 May 2004. The album has been certified two times platinum for having sold more than 60,000 copies. The group was awarded "Best Danish Debut" at the Zulu Awards in November 2004.

In 2005, the group played more than 100 concerts, including the Grøn Koncert tour, and released their second album, LUXUS, in October 2005. As their debut album, this album has also been certified platinum with more than 40,000 sold.

In 2008, Johnny Deluxe released their third album, De knuste hjerters klub.

In 2009, they took part in Dansk Melodi Grand Prix, the Danish national selection for the Eurovision Song Contest.

In the beginning of 2010 drummer Morten Lynggaard and Guitarist Soren Itenov parted with the band and JD signed a deal with the label Black Pelican In August 2010, JD released a greatest hits album with 8 old hits and 2 new songs. The first single from that album is called Flex and is out June 14, 2010.

On January 27, 2012 the band announced the split up of the band.

During spring 2015 the band was reunited, and through the summer 2015 they went on tour to festivals and clubs.

== Discography ==
=== Albums ===
- Johnny Deluxe (2004)
- LUXUS (2005)
- De knuste hjerters klub (2008)
- De største af de første (2010)

=== Singles ===
- "Elskovspony" (EP) (2003)
- "Drømmer jeg?" (feat. Anna Nordell) (2004)
- "Vi vil ha' mer" (2004)
- "Sommeren er forbi" (2005)
- "Det du gør" (2005)
- "Drenge som mig" (2005)
- "En for alle" (2006)
- "Så er det sommer" (2008)
- "Aldrig" (feat. Szhirley) (2008)
- "Sindssyg" (2009)
- "Flex" (2010)
- "Vild med din veninde" (2011)
- "Til Verdens ende" (2016)
- "Systembolaget" (feat. Mange Schmidt) (2017)
- "Er du hos ham nu" (2017)
- "Så blir Drenge til mænd" (feat. Emmelie de Forest) (2018)
- "Kun som en Ven" (2022)
- "Usynlig" (2026)
