= Lost (band) =

Italian pop band

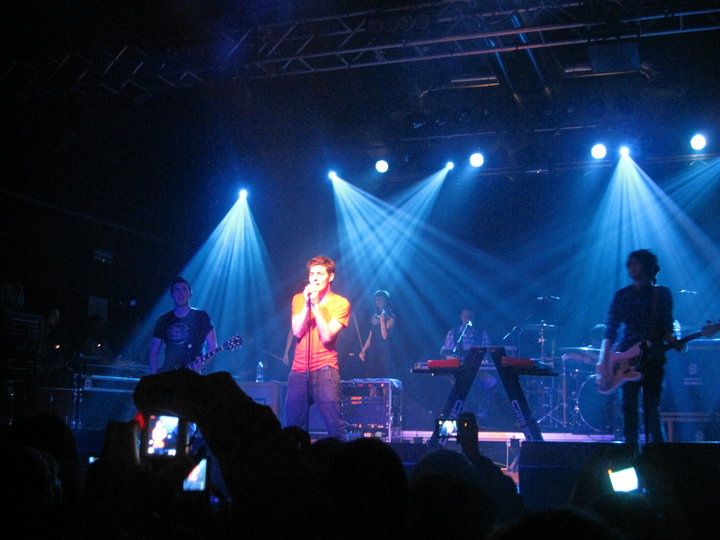
- Lost live at "Magazzini Generali" in Milan, 2010.

Background information
- Origin: Thiene, Italy
- Genres: Pop
- Years active: 2003-2011
- Label: Carosello
- Members: Walter Fontana; Roberto Visentin; Luca Donazzan
- Past members: Matthew Miller; Giulio Dalla Stella; Filippo Spezzapria; Alessandro Michelazzo
- Website: www.instagram.com/lost__band/

Lost is an Italian pop band consisting of musicians from Vicenza and Thiene, in Northern Italy.

== History ==
Lost officially came together in the middle of 2003, through the friendship of the band's singer Walter Fontana, and the guitarist Roberto Visentin, who were soon joined by the drummer Filippo Spezzapria, bassist Matthew Miller and guitarist Giulio Dalla Stella. A few months after their formation they played their first show at a local festival. In 2006, due to internal disputes, Miller was replaced by the new bassist Luca Donazzan.

The publication of their demo track My (?) on MySpace in 2006 proved to be an unexpected success amongst the social network users. Following this, Lost signed a contract with Bass Department records and the producers Matteo Franzan and Stefano Florino, in 2006.

In the middle of 2007 the group signed up for the Cornetto Free Music Audition and was chosen by the director of the TRL Extra Live Italian Music channel. Thanks to this, and the showing of their music video Oggi (Italian for "Today"), Lost was talent-spotted by the record company Carosello, who offered the band a contract in September 2007

The single Oggi was released on 15 November 2007, and the following week entered the Italian singles chart in twenty-seventh place, mainly thanks to the single's promotion on MTV Italy. At the end of the year, Lost was nominated as the best Italian "riempipiazza 2007" (Meaning the band which could best fill a town square during their show), beside other Italian and international artists. In the new year, the band released their second single Tra pioggia e nuvole (Between rain and clouds) which was also promoted by Total Request Live (TRL).

On 25 January 2008 their first album XD was published. The album entered the Italian album chart in twenty-seventh position. After the release of the album the group embarked on their first Italian tour: XD Live Tour 2.0.

In the middle of 2008, Lost opened two dates of Tokio Hotel's Italian tour, in Rome and in Modena.

In late 2008 Lost's guitarist, Giulio Dalla Stella, left to continue his studies at university and obtain a degree.

In 2009, Lost released a single with Joel Madden from the pop-punk band Good Charlotte, called "Sulla Mia pelle", meaning On My Skin. It immediately went to number one on TRL and Lost won the Best Band on TRL Italy. "Sulla mia pelle" is the first single of the new album "Sospeso". The album reached gold status in Italy. The second single from "Sospeso" is the ballad "Sopra il mondo". The band recently went on to win the Best Italian Act for the MTV Europe Music Awards and were also nominated for Best European Act.

On April 4, 2018, the Lost through their social network accounts officially communicate their return.

As of April 15, 2018, all Lost albums are available on the Spotify platform.

On April 18, 2018, the Lost communicate their very first date after the reunion. They will perform in the group's hometown, Thiene (VI), on June 21, 2018, in Piazza Chilesotti at 21:35.

On May 29, 2019 (11 years after the release of the single "Standby") the new single "Una canzone buona" was released.

On Dic 12, 2019 was released a new single called "I suoi vent'anni".

== Interaction with fans ==
Since their very beginnings the group has had direct contact with its listeners through the internet, with different initiatives to facilitate this contact being used on their official site and their MySpace page. In February 2008, the group launched an official podcast in which they publish backstage clips and things relating to the band not concerning live shows.

== Break Up ==
Lost in 2011 decided to take a break from the scene. Walter has decided to release a solo album in the meantime, while others are dedicated to another project.

Lost in 2018 decided to come back with new music.

== Awards ==
Awards won in bold.

- 2007 - Italian MTV TRL Awards - Best Riempipiazza (nominated)
- 2009 - **Italian MTV TRL Awards - Best Band**
- 2009 - Italian MTV TRL Awards - Best #1 Of The Year (nominated)
- 2009 - Italian MTV TRL Awards - Best TRL Artist Of The Year (nominated)
- 2009 - Italian MTV TRL Awards - Best Riempipiazza (nominated)
- 2009 - **Wind Music Awards - F.I.M.I. Award for Young Artist**
- 2009 - **MTV Europe Music Awards 2009 - Best Italian Act**
- 2009 - **Gold Disc for the album "Sospeso"**
- 2009 - **Platinum DVD for the DVD "Lost live@Mtv"**
- 2010 - **Italian MTV TRL Awards - Best Fan Club**
- 2010 - Italian MTV TRL Awards - Best Band (nominated)
- 2010 - Italian MTV TRL Awards - Best TRL Video (nominated)
- 2010 - **Wind Music Awards - F.I.M.I. Award for Young Artist**
- 2010 - **Rome Videoclip "Il cinema incontra la musica" with "Il Cantante"**

== Discography ==
Albums

**Sweet Memories to Still Believe**

- Official Release: 2006
- Tracks
1. Intro
2. Tour Holiday
3. My Anthem
4. Don't call me
5. Another day
6. Sweet Memories to still Believe
7. These Emotions
8. Superstar
9. Faith
10. Summer Love
11. American College
12. A long epic story something indeed anonymous

Albums

**XD**

- Official Release: 28 January 2008 (ITALY)
- Chart: #27 (ITA)
- Sold: 20,000 +
- Tracks
1. Standby
2. Oggi
3. Nel silenzio
4. Tra pioggia e nuvole
5. Di fronte a te
6. Ascolta
7. Troppe volte
8. In cerca di una scusa
9. Una nuova scena
10. Sul tuo viso
11. My (?)
- Official Singles:
  - 2008: "Tra pioggia e nuvole"
  - 2008: "Oggi"
  - 2008: "Ascolta"
  - 2008: "Standby"
  - 2008: "Nel silenzio"

Albums

**Sospeso**

- Official Release: 29 May 2009
- Sold: 40,000 +
- Tracks
1. Sopra Il Mondo 4.05
2. Sulla Mia Pelle feat. Joel Madden 3.33
3. Immagini 3.50
4. Vieni Con Me 3.31
5. Sospeso 3.37
6. SexyBack cover 3.27
7. In Mille Pezzi 3.44
8. Dentro i Tuoi Occhi 3.10
- Official Singles:
  - 2009: "Sulla Mia Pelle"
  - 2009: "Sopra Il Mondo"

Albums

**Allora sia buon viaggio**

- Official Release: 4 May 2010 (ITALY)
- Tracks
1. Aria
2. Come in un quadro di Chagall
3. Due ore all'alba
4. L'applauso del cielo
5. Per te
6. Il cantante
7. Un mondo da inventare
8. Allora sia buon viaggio
9. Un segreto
10. Blu
11. Pugni al vento e calci alle nuvole
- Official Singles:
  - 2010: "L'applauso del cielo"
  - 2010: "Il cantante"
  - 2010: "Blu"

Albums

**Singles**

  - 2019: "Una canzone buona"
  - 2019: "I suoi vent'anni"
