= Happoradio =

Finnish rock band

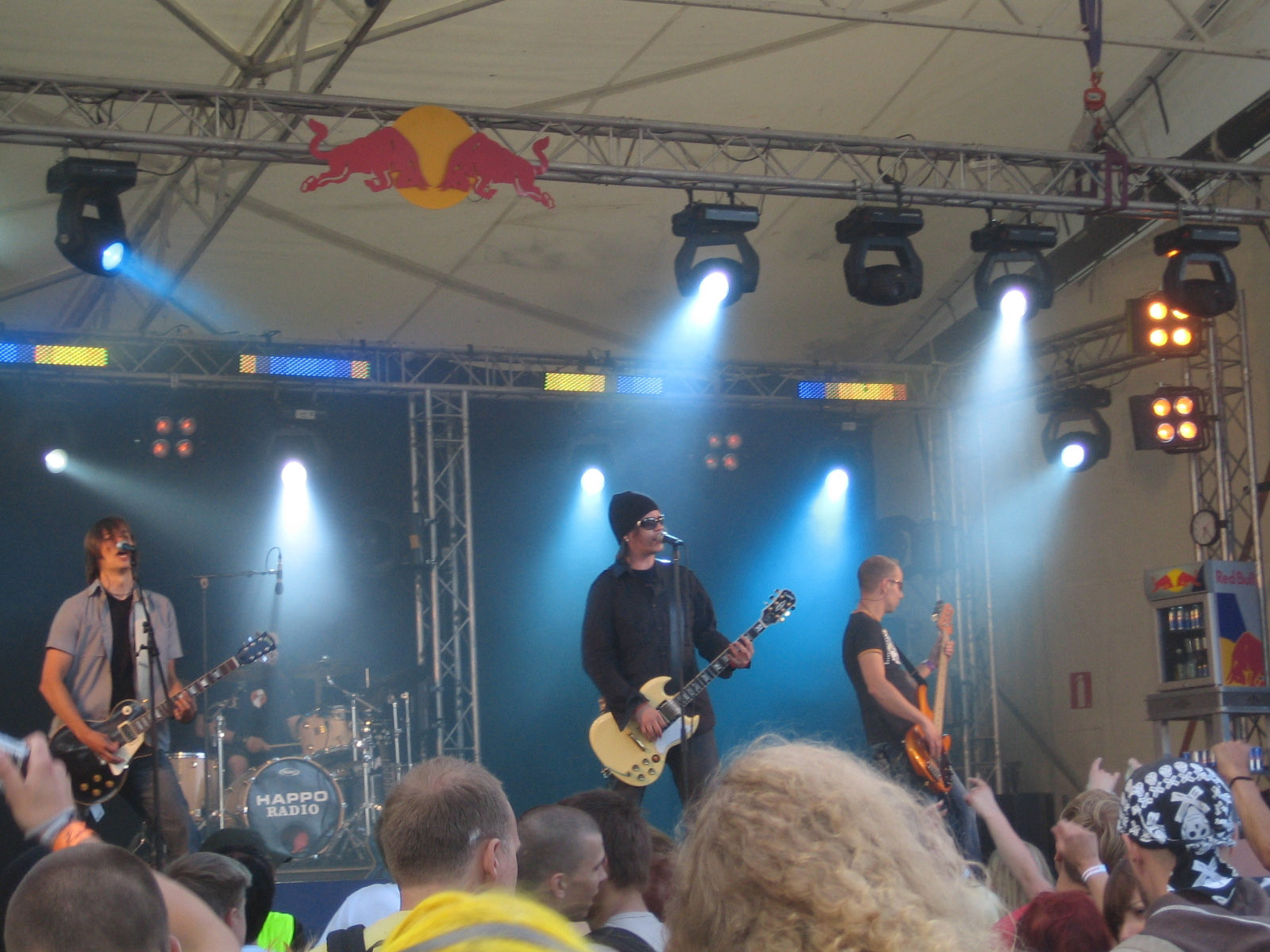
- Happoradio on stage in 2006.

Background information
- Origin: Helsinki, Finland
- Genre: Rock
- Years active: 2001–present
- Label: Epic
- Members: Aki Tykki; AH Haapasalo; Jatu Motti; Markku DeFrost; Klaus Suominen
- Past members: Miki Pii
- Website: http://www.happoradio.net

Happoradio (Finnish for Acid Radio) is a Finnish rock band formed in 2001. They achieved their first success with the single "Pois Kalliosta" (2003). "Tavikset", "Che Guevara", "Ahmat tulevat" and "Pelastaja" are some of their other hits in the Scandinavian market.

== Members ==
- Aki Tykki (voice, guitar)
- Mika "AH" Haapasalo (guitar)
- Jatu Motti (bass)
- Markku DeFrost (drums)
- Klaus Suominen (Keyboard)

== Discography ==
=== Studio albums ===
Title and details	Peak position	Notes
Title and details	FIN	Notes
Asemalla: Year released: 2003; Meaning: At the station	24	1. Asemalla (At the station); 2. Pahoille teille (To bad roads); 3. Pohjalta (From the bottom); 4. Tuhkaa hangelle (Ash to the snow); 5. Pois Kalliosta (Away from Kallio); 6. Sinä (You); 7. Kaksi tarinaa (Two stories); 8. Ikävä ihollesi (Missing your skin); 9. Happoa (Acid); 10. Väärä mies (The wrong man); 11. Nolla (Nothing)
Pienet ja keskisuuret elämät: Year released: 2004; Meaning: Small and medium-sized lives	28	1. Älä huuda (Don't Shout); 2. Linnusta sammakoksi (From a bird to a frog); 3. Kaupunki täynnä ihmisiä (A city full of people); 4. Liittymät kiinni (Junctions closed); 5. Hitaasti (Slowly); 6. Tanssi (Dance); 7. Pelko (Fear); 8. Sitä et tahdo (That's not what you want); 9. Muistoksi (In memory); 10. Omatunto (Conscience); 11. Pikkuveli (Little brother)
Vuosipäivä: Year released: 2006; Meaning: Anniversary	23	1. Varo miestä (Beware of the man); 2. HC-sää (HC-weather); 3. Suru on (Sorrow is); 4. Palaset (Pieces); 5. Lumen alle (Under the snow); 6. Tomu (Dust); 7. Tavikset (Ordinary People); 8. Pumppu (Pump); 9. Tytön täytyy tehdä (The girl has to do); 10. Encore
Kaunis minä: Year released: 2008; Meaning: Beautiful me	1	1. Olette kauniita (You are beautiful); 2. Che Guevara; 3. Itä-Suomessa tuulee (It's windy in Eastern Finland); 4. Hirsipuu (Gallows); 5. Nukahdistus (combination of two Finnish words, nukahtaminen (= falling asleep) and ahdistus (= anguish)); 6. Puhu äänellä jonka kuulen (Speak with a voice I can hear); 7. Uhrille (Välisoitto) (For the victim (intermission)); 8. Kostaja (Avenger); 9. Monta miestä (Many men); 10. Ruumiinavauspöytäkirja (Autopsy report); 11. Kallioniemi; 12. Unelmia ja toimistohommia (Dreams and office jobs - the original is by Leevi and the Leavings)
Puolimieli: Year released: 2010; Meaning: Halfmind	1	1. Ahmat tulevat (Wolverines are coming); 2. Ihmisenpyörä (Human wheel); 3. 01:30 (elossa) "(01:30 (alive))" 4. Anna anteeksi "(Forgive me)" 5. Sahattu oksa, poltettu silta (The sawed bough, the burned bridge); 6. Pohtija (The thinker); 7. Pelastaja (Savior); 8. Umpisolmu (Quagmire); 9. Häävalssi mollissa (Wedding waltz in minor); 10. Ottaisitko silti minut (Would you still take me)
Elefantti: Year released: 2014; Meaning: Elephant	1	1. Pimeäntaite (Edge of darkness); 2. Luonasi on linnani (With you is my castle); 3. Kuusi jalkaa kevätjäälle (Six feet to spring ice); 4. Älä anna paskiaisten päättää (Don't let the bastards decide); 5. Sinä & hän (You and (s)he); 6. Kaunis ihminen (Beautiful person); 7. Elefantti (Elephant); 8. Rakkaus on sotku (Välisoitto III) (Love is a mess (intermission III); 9. Vakava nainen (Serious woman); 10. Loistava tulevaisuus (Glorious future); 11. Ateistin aamuhartaus (Atheist's morning devotion)
Kauniin kääntöpiiri: Year released: 2017; Meaning: Beautiful tropic	1	1. Valopallo (Ball of light); 2. Ihan hyvät ihmiset (Pretty good people); 3. Puhuit linnuista (You talked of birds); 4. Älä puhu huomisesta (Don't talk of tomorrow); 5. Sinun vaikka hajoat (Yours, though you're breaking); 6. Ihan rauhassa (Take it easy); 7. Mies vailla huomista (Man without tomorrow); 8. Jokainen hetki on väärin (Every moment is wrong); 9. Leevin laulu (Leevi's song); 10. Pidä pinnalla pää (Keep your head above surface)
Majakka: Year released: 2021; Meaning: Lighthouse	5	
Me tarvitsemme toisiamme: Year released: 2026; Meaning: We Need Each Other	7	

=== Compilation albums ===
Title & Details	Peak position
Title & Details	FIN
Jälkiä 2001-2011: Year released: 2011; Meaning: Best 2001-2011	6
Ihmisen mittainen – Tarinoita 2002–2022: Released: 2022	14

=== Singles ===
Single	Year	Peak positions	Album
Single	Year	FIN	Album
"Pahoille teille"	2002	19	Asemalla
"Sinä"	2003	13	Asemalla
"Kaupunki täynnä ihmisiä"	2004	14	Pienet ja keskisuuret elämät
"Che Guevara"	2008	2	Kaunis minä
"Puhu äänellä jonka kuulen"	2008	3	Kaunis minä
"Ihmisenpyörä"	2010	14	Puolimieli
"Pelastaja"	2010	5	Puolimieli

== Videos ==
- Sinä (2003) Director: Tero Rajala
- Pois Kalliosta (2003) Director: Tuukka Temonen
- Linnusta sammakoksi (2005) Director: Aleksi Koskinen
- Tavikset (2006) Director: Kusti Manninen
- Suru on (2006) Director: Mikko Kallio
- Hirsipuu (2008) Director: Kusti Manninen
- Che Guevara (2008) Director: Kusti Manninen, Jaakko Manninen
- Puhu äänellä jonka kuulen (2008) Director: Ari Matikainen
- Olette kauniita (2009) Director: Jussi Mäkelä
- Pelastaja (2010) Director: Hannu Aukia
- Ahmat tulevat (2011) Director: Ari Matikainen
- Hiljaa niin kuin kuolleet (2011) Director: Jaani Kivinen
- Sinä & Hän (2013) Director: Ville Juurikkala
