= Anna Nordell =

Swedish singer

Anna Sara Christina Engh (born Nordell, 19 February 1982) is a Swedish singer. "Drømmer jeg?", performed with Danish Johnny Deluxe reached the top 5 on the MTV Up North chart. Nordell also wrote a song for the soundtrack of the Swedish movie Det blir aldrig som man tänkt sig and performed "I'll Still Love You Then" for the soundtrack of the Message in a Bottle.

Nordell's voice is featured in Bomfunk MC's' "Turn It Up", 2005 Rock Angelz album and in Celine Dion's album One Heart. Her other back vocals include those provided for Victoria Beckham, Tata Young, Dannii Minogue, Fredrik Kempe, Mauro Scocco, Glenmark Eriksson Strömstedt, E-Type and Vanessa Hudgens' "Whatever Will Be". Nordell also did some dubbing.

When she was 14, Nordell got to play the part of Liesl in the musical The Sound of Music at Göta Lejon Theatre in Stockholm. One of Nordell's songs, "Giving up", ended up on a compilation record Fame Factory 4.
