= Mondscheiner =

- Origin: Austria
- Genres: Rock, pop rock
- Years active: 2002-present
- Label: Sony BMG
- Members: Manuel Rubey; Stefan Laczkovics; Boris Fiala; July Skone
- Past members: Karl Kühn (2002-2005); Heimo Korak (2002-2006)
- Website: Mondscheiner.com

Mondscheiner was an Austrian pop rock band, which was established 2002 in Vienna.

They started out playing in local bars and discos. Their first EP was Die Kunst der Verführung(2003).

In 2004 they tried to become famous with their debut album La belle captive, but their attempt failed.

In spring 2006, they signed a disk contract with Sony BMG. On 4 July their debut single "Das was wir sind" was played the first time. In the end of the summer 2006, they brought out their 2nd album Diese Stadt. It was much more successful than all their other CDs.

In December 2006, Heimo Korak was kicked out of the band. Months later July Skone came as his successor

Their music style is similar to Echt, Wir sind Helden and Sportfreunde Stiller.

== Discography ==
=== Albums ===
| Year | Title | Chart Positions | |
| Year | Title | AUT | AuH |
|---|---|---|---|
| 2006 | Diese Stadt: 1st studio album; Released: 25 August 2006 | 14 | 4 |

- La belle captive (2004)
- Diese Stadt (2006)

=== EPs ===
- Die Kunst der Verführung (2003)

=== Singles ===
| Year | Title | Chart Positions | | Album |
| Year | Title | AUT | AuH | Album |
|---|---|---|---|---|
| 2006 | "Das was wir sind" | 10 | 2 | Diese Stadt |
| 2007 | "Mittendrin" | 46 | - | Diese Stadt |
| 2007 | "Dieser Tag" | 18 | 3 | Diese Stadt |

- "Das was wir sind" (2006)
- "Mittendrin" (for Mitten im 8en, 2007)

== Nominations ==
- Austrian Newcomer Award 2007 (Das was wir sind)
