= Stop! Dimentica =

Single by Tiziano Ferro

from the album Nessuno è solo
- Released: May 26, 2006
- Recorded: 2006
- Genre: Pop rock
- Length: 3:48
- Label: EMI
- Songwriter: Tiziano Ferro
- Producer: Michele Canova

Tiziano Ferro singles chronology
| "Universal Prayer" (2004) | "Stop! Dimentica" (2006) | "Ed ero contentissimo" (2006) |

Alternative cover

"Stop! Dimentica" is a song written and recorded by Italian singer-songwriter Tiziano Ferro, released on 26 May 2006 as the lead single from his third studio album Nessuno è solo. The song was written by Ferro and produced by Michele Canova. The song samples Kelly Osbourne's "One Word".

It received positive reviews from music critics, who noted that it was a catchy radio hit. Commercially, the song topped the charts in Italy and Austria, while it reached the top-ten in Spain and Switzerland.

The song's music video was recorded in Bulgaria and directed by Antti Jokinen. The model Victoria Dzhumparova collaborated on the music video.

== Track listing ==
1. Stop! Dimentica
2. Stop! Dimentica (Kelly Osbourne One Word Remix)
3. Stop! Dimentica (Melodica Dimentica Remix)
4. Stop! Dimentica (Melodica Edit Remix)
5. Stop! Olvidate
6. Stop! Dimentica (Acoustic Version) - exclusive for iTunes Store

== Charts ==
=== Peak positions ===
| Chart (2006) | Peak position |
|---|---|
| Austria (Ö3 Austria Top 40) | 1 |
| Belgium (Ultratop 50 Wallonia) | 14 |
| CIS Airplay (TopHit) | 139 |
| Europe (European Hot 100) | 69 |
| Germany (GfK) | 50 |
| Italy (FIMI) | 1 |
| Spain (Promusicae) | 10 |
| Switzerland (Schweizer Hitparade) | 3 |

=== Year-end charts ===
| Chart (2006) | Position |
|---|---|
| Austrian Singles Chart | 7 |
| Belgian Singles Chart (Wallonia) | 51 |
| Italian Singles Chart | 8 |
| Swiss Singles Chart | 13 |

== Certifications and sales ==
Certifications for Stop! Dimentica
| Region | Certification | Certified units/sales |
|---|---|---|
| Austria (IFPI Austria) | Gold | 15,000^{*} |
| Italy | — | 100,000 |
| Switzerland (IFPI Switzerland) | Gold | 15,000^{^} |
^{*} Sales figures based on certification alone.^{^} Shipments figures based on certification alone.
