= Peter Wackel =

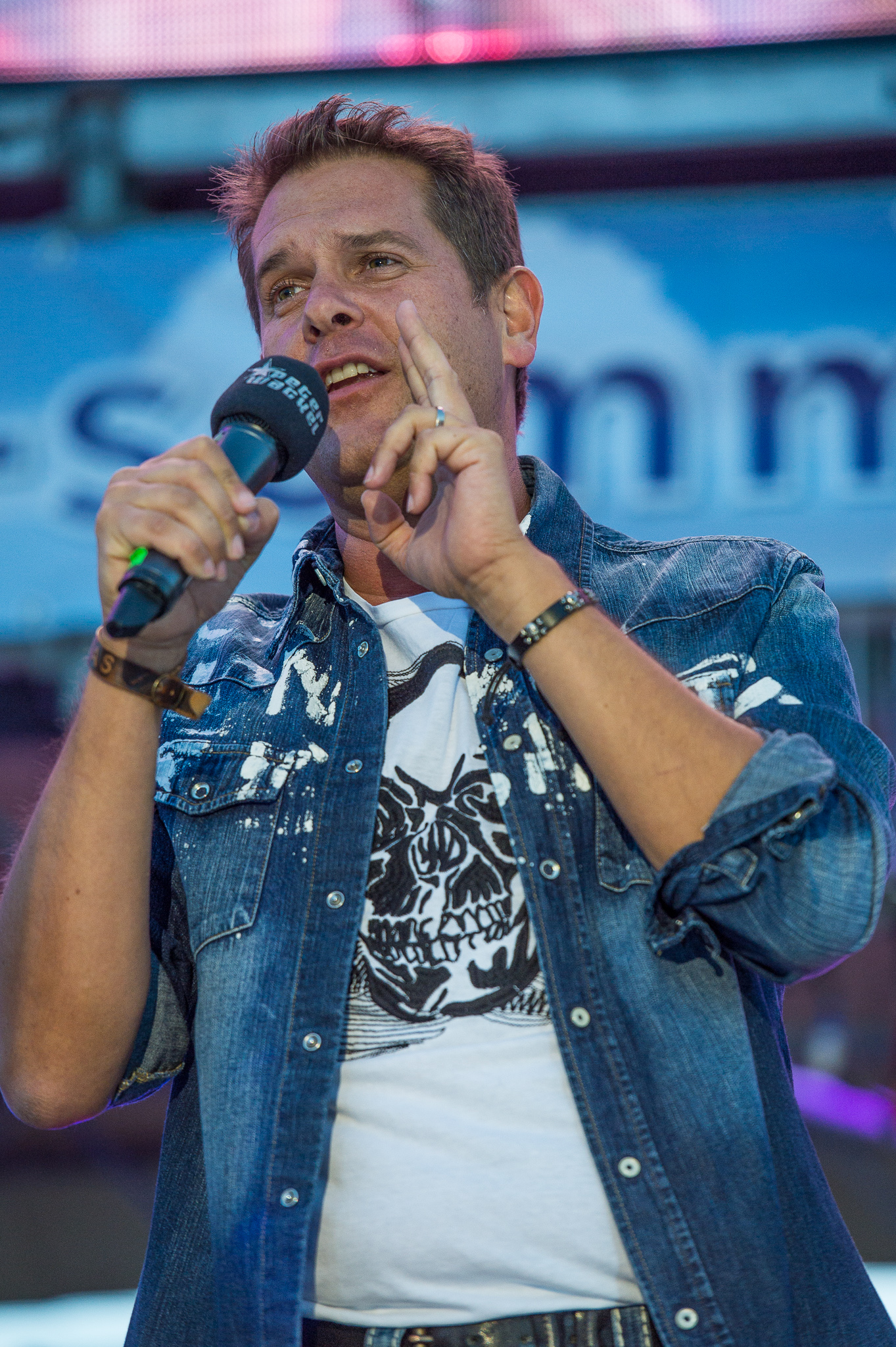
- Wackel in 2016

Background information
- Born: January 4, 1977 (age 49); Erlangen, Bavaria, West Germany
- Genres: Schlager
- Occupation: Singer
- Years active: 1998–present
- Website: www.wackel.de

Peter Wackel (born Steffen Peter Haas on 4 January 1977 in Erlangen) is a German singer.

== Life ==
Wackel sings German Schlager songs. He is very popular in Mallorca. Wackel is also a big hit in the German city of Düsseldorf and is often played in their biggest night time hot spot Anton's.

== Discography ==
Albums

- 1999: Jetzt wackelts im Karton
- 2000: Liebe, Sünde Leidenschaft
- 2001: Wackelkontakt
- 2003: Livealbum
- 2006: Wackel Peter – Das Best of Peter Wackel Album
- 2008: Wackel Total!
- 2009: DVD 11 Jahre Peter Wackel

Singles

- 1998: Vier (nachts stand ich vor ihr)
- 1999: Party, Palmen, Weiber und 'n Bier
- 2001: I’ve Had the Time of My Life (with Sharon Williams)
- 2003: So schmeckt der Sommer
- 2004: Nüchtern bin ich so schüchtern
- 2005: Das Lied über mich (featuring Power Wuschel)
- 2006: Ladioo
- 2007: Ü30
- 2007: Joana (Du geile Sau) / Heimweh nach der Insel (featuring Chriss Tuxi)
- 2008: Joana Mallorca at live Version (featuring Chriss Tuxi)
- 2008: Manchmal möchte ich schon mit dir … (with Chriss Tuxi)
- 2009: In den Bergen ist's am Besten / Auf Mallorca ist's am Besten
- 2009: Kenn nicht deinen Namen – scheißegal (Besoffen)
- 2009: Eviva Espana
- 2010: Kenn jetzt deinen Namen (Schabracke)
- 2010: Es gibt nur ein Gas – Vollgas
- 2010: Elvira ist schwanger
- 2010: Deutschlaaand Deutschlaaand
- 2011: Woochenende!
- 2011: Bye bye Belinda
- 2012: Ich kauf mir lieber einen Tirolerhut
- 2012: Bongiorno (feat. Ikke Hüftgold & Lena Nitro)
- 2012: Alt wie ein Baum
- 2012: Heute Nacht geht es ab (with Klaus & Klaus)
- 2013: Erika (Komm mit mir nach Amerika)
- 2013: Scheiß drauf! Mallorca ist nur einmal im Jahr
- 2013: Bier her
