= Hund am Strand =

German pop band

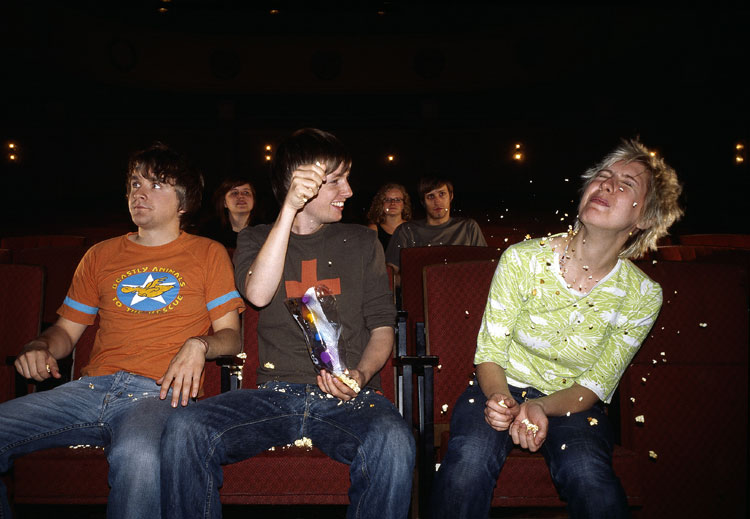

Background information
- Genres: Pop rock
- Years active: 2004–2007
- Members: Guitar, vocals: Fabian Schwinger drums: Martin "Marv" Thomas; Bass: Tina Mamczur
- Website: http://www.hundamstrand.de

Hund am Strand (literally 'Dog at the Beach') was a German pop rock band from Berlin.

Their first album Adieu Sweet Bahnhof (Goodbye Sweet Train station) first appeared on 30 September 2005. The first single was the song "Jungen Mädchen" (Boys Girls), after which followed "Neues Lied" (New Song). A tour through Germany and Austria began following the release of the album.

== Band history ==
Fabian Schwinger (Guitar) and Tina Mamczur (Bass) first met at university. Drummer Martin "Marv" Thomas completed the group.

Tobias Siebert heard Fabian, Tina and Marv play and began the first steps for their 2004 EP release. Through the internet, it reached the ears of Bielefeld Label Tenstaag and thus led to the band's first recording contract in May 2005. By September 2005, "Adieu Sweet bahnhof" had already been re-released, this time with Motor Music.

In the summer of 2006, the live-EP Werkstatt Live (Workshop live) was released, which included five tracks from the band's appearances in Rüsselsheim and Potsdam in May 2006. Among these, three new titles could be found which were mixed in Düsseldorf in the Stattwerk-Studios and thus the album's name.

In May 2007, the band announced their breakup on their website.

== Discography ==
=== Albums ===
- Adieu Sweet Bahnhof (2005)

=== EPs ===
- Werkstatt Live (2006)

=== Singles ===
- Jungen Mädchen (2005)
- Neues Lied (2006, Online release only)
