= Maya Saban =

German singer (born 1978)

Maya Saban (Jewdyssee)
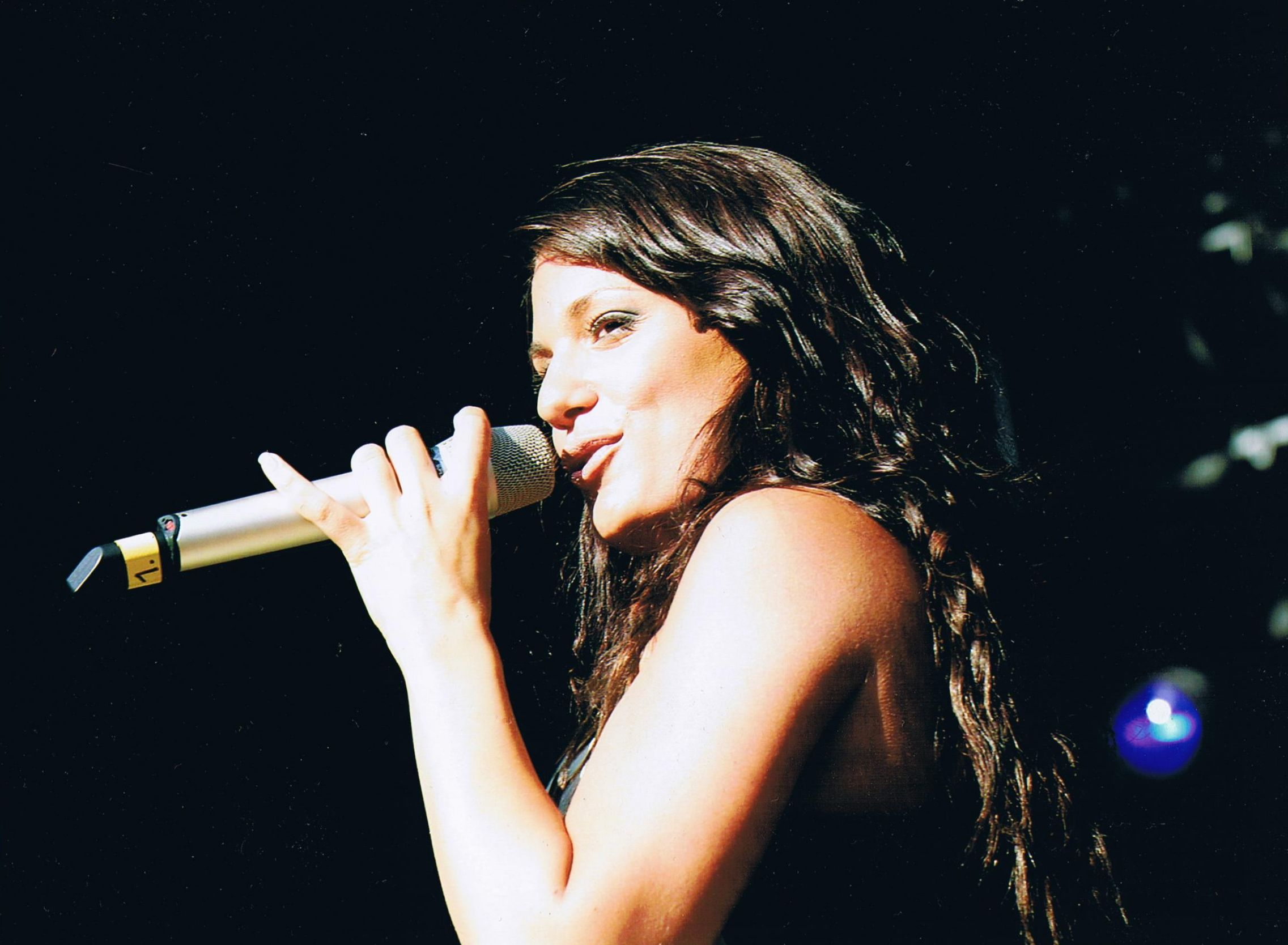

Background information
- Born: 8 October 1978 (age 47); Berlin, Germany
- Website: www.mayasaban.de

Maya Saban (born 8 October 1978) is a German singer. She was born in Berlin, Germany to an Israeli father, Shlomo Saban, and a German mother. As a child, she took music and dance lessons. Saban sang backing vocals for singer Sabrina Setlur and later appeared on the album Leben by German electronic act Schiller. On 25 July 2005, she released her solo debut album, Mit Jedem Ton (With Every Note), with Virgin Records.

She provided the vocal's for Schiller's songs "I've Seen it All" and "I Miss You". She also provided backing vocals for Satellite, the winning song of the Eurovision Song Contest 2010.
