= Rosenstolz discography =

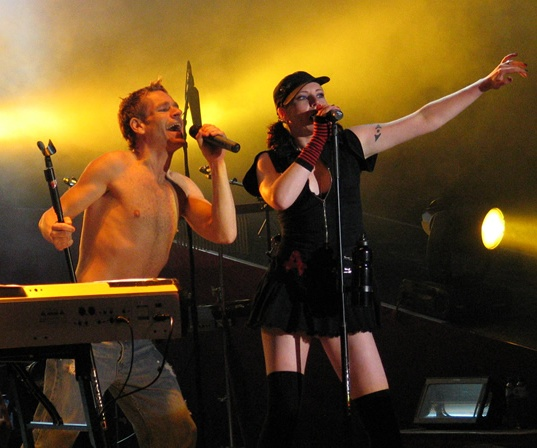
- Rosenstolz performing live in Leipzig (2004)
- Studio albums: 12
- Live albums: 4
- Compilation albums: 7
- Singles: 40
- Video albums: 6

The discography of Rosenstolz, a German pop duo from Berlin, includes 12 studio albums and at least 40 singles, released between 1992 and 2012. The band also released a number of live albums, six compilation albums and video albums.

Rosenstolz's first chart hit was "Herzensschöner", which reached No. 34 in the German singles chart in 1998. However, it was not until 2000 with the release of the single "Amo Vitam" that the band received frequent airplay on German music television stations. The following year, "Es könnt' ein Anfang sein" became the band's first German top 10 single. Rosenstolz's great breakthrough in Germany then came in 2004 with the album Herz, which reached triple platinum status and gave rise to four top 20 singles, including "Liebe ist alles" and "Willkommen". Major chart hits from later albums were "Ich bin ich (Wir sind wir)", "Gib mir Sonne" and "Wir sind am Leben", which peaked at No. 2, No. 1 and No. 3, respectively, in the German singles chart.

Although none of Rosenstolz's songs from the early to mid-nineties entered the charts, some of them remained regular features of Rosenstolz concerts in later years. These songs included "Schlampenfieber", "Nur einmal noch", "Lachen", "Der Moment", "Die Schlampen sind müde" and "Königin". A notable song was "Schlampenfieber", which was performed in a different musical style for each concert tour.

Five of Rosenstolz's studio albums went straight to No. 1 in the German albums chart: Kassengift (2000), Herz (2004), Das große Leben (2006), Die Suche geht weiter (2008) and Wir sind am Leben (2011). The last three of these albums also reached No. 1 in Austria and charted highly in Switzerland. Rosenstolz's most commercially successful album was Das große Leben, which sold over one million copies in Germany and also received platinum and gold statuses in Austria and Switzerland, respectively.

== Albums ==
=== Studio albums ===
Year	Title	Peak chart positions			Certifications
Year	Title	GER	AUT	SWI	Certifications
1992	Soubrette werd' ich nie	93 (Note: This chart position relates to the 2007 re-release of the album. The original 1992 release did not enter the charts.)	—	—	
1994	Nur einmal noch	—	—	—	
1995	Mittwoch is' er fällig	—	—	—	
1996	Objekt der Begierde	—	—	—	
1997	Die Schlampen sind müde	31	—	—	
1999	Zucker	2	—	—	
2000	Kassengift	1	—	—	GER: Gold
2002	Macht Liebe	3	51	—	GER: Gold
2004	Herz	1	20	55	GER: 3× Platinum
2006	Das große Leben	1	1	10	GER: 11× Gold; AUT: Platinum; SWI: Gold
2008	Die Suche geht weiter	1	1	2	GER: 3× Platinum; AUT: Gold; SWI: Gold
2011	Wir sind am Leben	1	1	3	GER: 3× Gold; AUT: Gold
"—" denotes releases that did not chart or were not released in that country.

=== Live albums ===
Year	Title	Peak chart positions			Certifications
Year	Title	GER	AUT	SWI	Certifications
1999	Zuckerschlampen:live	5	—	—	
2003	Live aus Berlin	11	—	—	
2006	Das große Leben live	*	19	*	
2009	Die Suche geht weiter live	*	30	*	
"—" denotes releases that did not chart or were not released in that country. "*" indicates sales figures for the live album were combined with those for the corresponding studio album.

=== Compilation albums ===
Year	Title	Peak chart positions			Certifications
Year	Title	GER	AUT	SWI	Certifications
1994	Sanfte Verführer (Note: Limited edition charity album)	—	—	—	
1997	Raritäten	—	—	—	
1998	Alles Gute (Note: This album was later re-released with an updated album cover and the new title Alles Gute – Das Beste von 92 bis 98. Another version of the album containing a bonus CD was also released with the title Alles Gute – Die Goldedition – Das Beste von 92 bis 01.)	10	—	—	GER: Gold
2000	Stolz der Rose – Das Beste und mehr	—	—	—	
2000	Raritäten 2	—	—	—	
2016	Das Beste	54	—	—	
2018	Lass es Liebe sein – Die schönsten Lieder	2	22	36	
"—" denotes releases that did not chart or were not released in that country.

=== Video albums ===
Year	Title	Peak chart positions	Certifications
Year	Title	GER	Certifications
2003	Die Videos 1995–2001 (VHS & DVD)	—	
2003	Live aus Berlin (DVD)	—	GER: Platinum
2004	Herz (DVD)	—	GER: Gold
2004	Willkommen in unserer Welt (DVD)	27	GER: Platinum
2006	Das große Leben live (DVD)	—	
2009	Die Suche geht weiter live (DVD)	—	
"—" denotes releases that did not chart or were not released in that country.

=== Karaoke albums ===
Year	Title
2003	Ohne Worte

=== Other albums ===
In 1998, Rosenstolz parted ways with producer Tom Müller. He retained control of some of Rosenstolz's earlier recordings and these have been re-released over the years as various compilation albums by record label Musik für Erwachsene (MfE). The following MfE compilations are not listed in the discography on the official Rosenstolz website.

Year	Title	Peak chart positions	
Year	Title	GER	AUT
2003	Kuss der Diebe	80	—
2004	Erwarten se nix	47	—
2005	Wenn du aufwachst	68	—
2006	Mondkuss	16	—
2008	Traum vom Fliegen	23	25
2010	Frauen schlafen nie (Note: Released by Weltbild Musik with permission from Musik für Erwachsene)	—	—
2011	Strahlende Nächte	48	—
2012	Balladen	—	—
2013	Lebend Erwacht	—	—
"—" denotes releases that did not chart or were not released in that country.

== Singles ==
Year	Title	Peak chart positions			Album
Year	Title	GER	AUT	SWI	Album
1992	"Ich geh' auf Glas"	—	—	—	Soubrette werd' ich nie
1993	"Schlampenfieber"	—	—	—	Soubrette werd' ich nie
1994	"Nur einmal noch"	—	—	—	Nur einmal noch
1994	"Kuss der Diebe"	—	—	—	Nur einmal noch
1995	"Mittwoch is' er fällig"	—	—	—	Mittwoch is' er fällig
1995	"Lachen" (Radio Version)	—	—	—	Mittwoch is' er fällig
1996	"Sex im Hotel"	—	—	—	Objekt der Begierde
1996	"Der Moment"	—	—	—	Objekt der Begierde
1997	"Objekt der Begierde" / "Lass es regnen"	—	—	—	Objekt der Begierde
1997	"Ich stell' mich an die nächste Wand (Monotonie)" / "Die Schlampen sind müde"	—	—	—	Die Schlampen sind müde
1998	"Herzensschöner" / "Königin" (Note: Both songs also released as alternative single titled "Königin")	34	—	—	Alles Gute
1998	"Nur einmal noch '98" / "Herzensschöner"	75	—	—	Alles Gute
1998	"Lachen" (Radio Version) (Note: Promo CD)	—	—	—	Alles Gute
1999	"Perlentaucher"	40	—	—	Zucker
1999	"Fütter deine Angst" / "Ja, ich will (Hochzeitssong)" (with Hella von Sinnen)	52	—	—	Zucker
1999	"Zucker III" (Note: Promo CD)	—	—	—	Zucker
1999	"Ein anderes Gefühl von Schmerz" (Note: Promo CD)	—	—	—	Zucker
2000	"Amo Vitam"	19	—	—	Kassengift
2000	"Kinder der Nacht"	63	—	—	Kassengift
2001	"Total Eclipse" / "Die schwarze Witwe" (with Marc Almond / Nina Hagen)	22	—	—	Kassengift
2001	"Es könnt' ein Anfang sein"	8	—	—	Alles Gute – Die Goldedition
2002	"Sternraketen" / "Macht Liebe" (Note: Also released as DVD single)	11	—	—	Macht Liebe
2002	"Es tut immer noch weh"	21	—	—	Macht Liebe
2003	"Was kann ich für eure Welt"	12	—	—	Live aus Berlin (Note: Song is included in the single-CD edition of the album, but not in the double-CD edition.)
2004	"Liebe ist alles"	6	47	—	Herz
2004	"Ich will mich verlieben"	8	64	—	Herz
2004	"Willkommen" (from "Summer Storm") / "Der größte Trick"	8	44	—	Herz
2004	"Ich komm an dir nicht weiter"	14	69	—	Herz
2006	"Ich bin ich (Wir sind wir)"	2	5	16	Das große Leben
2006	"Nichts von alledem (tut mir leid)"	11	47	59	Das große Leben
2006	"Ich geh in Flammen auf" / "Das Glück liegt auf der Straße"	7	12	87	Das große Leben
2006	"Auch im Regen" / "Mein Sex"	8	35	—	Das große Leben
2007	"Aus Liebe wollt ich alles wissen"	15	40	66	Das große Leben
2008	"Gib mir Sonne"	1	3	13	Die Suche geht weiter
2008	"Wie weit ist vorbei"	8	37	—	Die Suche geht weiter
2009	"Blaue Flecken"	10	45	—	Die Suche geht weiter
2009	"Ich bin mein Haus"	29	—	—	Die Suche geht weiter
2011	"Wir sind am Leben" (Note: Also released as double single "Wir sind am Leben" / "Weil wir Freunde sind")	3	17	35	Wir sind am Leben
2011	"Weil wir Freunde sind"	—	—	—	
2012	"Lied von den Vergessenen" / "Wie lang kann ein Mensch tanzen?"	27	—	—	Wir sind am Leben
"—" denotes releases that did not chart or were not released in that country.

== Box sets ==
Year	Title	Contents
2007	Die Singles 92–07	Singles from 1992 to 2007
2007	3-CD Box	Kuss der Diebe; Erwarten se nix; Wenn du aufwachst
2009	Mal vier	Nur einmal noch; Mittwoch is' er fällig; Raritäten; Raritäten 2
2012	2 for 1	Das große Leben; Herz

== Demo cassettes ==
Prior to the release of the debut album Soubrette werd' ich nie, Rosenstolz produced three different music cassettes that were sold privately. A selection of demo songs from these cassettes can be found in the 2007 deluxe edition of Soubrette werd' ich nie as a bonus CD. In addition, the limited super deluxe edition of Wir sind am Leben includes a Rosenstolz music cassette from 1991 as well as a CD version of the cassette.
