= Total Eclipse/Die schwarze Witwe =

"Total Eclipse" / "Die schwarze Witwe"
- Front cover of CD 1, featuring Peter Plate, AnNa R. and Marc Almond (from left to right)

Single by Rosenstolz featuring Marc Almond and Nina Hagen

from the album Kassengift
- Released: 5 March 2001
- Genre: Pop
- Label: Polydor (Universal)

Nina Hagen singles chronology
"Der Wind hat mir ein Lied erzählt" (2000)	"Total Eclipse" / "Die schwarze Witwe" (2001)	"Seemann" (2003)

Alternative cover
- Front cover of CD 2, featuring Peter Plate, Nina Hagen and AnNa R. (from left to right)

"Total Eclipse" / "Die schwarze Witwe" is a double A-side single released in 2001 by German pop duo Rosenstolz, featuring guest singers Marc Almond (on "Total Eclipse") and Nina Hagen (on "Die schwarze Witwe"). The single reached No. 22 in the German singles chart.

== Background ==
Rosenstolz's collaboration with Almond came about after the English singer received one of the pop duo's CDs from a journalist and then contacted the duo a few days later. The song they chose to work on together, "Total Eclipse", was written by American musician Kristian Hoffman and originally recorded by German singer Klaus Nomi, appearing on Nomi's 1981 debut album. Both AnNa R. and Peter Plate of Rosenstolz were fans of Nomi. Almond also met Nomi in New York many years earlier.

For Rosenstolz's collaboration with Hagen, the duo themselves contacted the German singer. They felt that the song they had written, "Die schwarze Witwe" (The black widow), was tailor-made for her.

"Total Eclipse" and "Die schwarze Witwe" also appear on Rosenstolz's 2000 album Kassengift. However, the album's versions of the songs do not feature Almond and Hagen on vocals.

== Track listing ==
CD 1

Rosenstolz and Marc Almond are featured on the single cover.

1. "Total Eclipse" (Radio Version - Rosenstolz + Marc Almond) – 3:29
2. "Die schwarze Witwe" (Tarantula Radio Mix - Rosenstolz + Nina Hagen) – 4:22
3. "Du atmest nicht" (Rosenstolz + 2raumwohnung) – 3:50
4. "Enfants des nuits" – 5:23

CD 2

Rosenstolz and Nina Hagen are featured on the single cover.

1. "Total Eclipse" (Long Version - Rosenstolz + Marc Almond) – 3:59
2. "Die schwarze Witwe" (Rosenstolz + Nina Hagen) – 3:53
3. "Kassengift" (Drag Mix) – 4:44
4. "Les Larmes de Septembre" – 4:43
