= SingStar The Dome =

2005 video game

- PAL cover art
- Developer(s): SCEE Studio London
- Publisher(s): SCEE
- Series: SingStar
- Platform(s): PlayStation 2
- Release: EU: 1 June 2005
- Genre(s): Karaoke
- Mode(s): Single-player, multiplayer

SingStar The Dome is a variant of the game SingStar Pop and was only released in the German-speaking countries Germany and Austria.

== Track list ==
- Annett Louisan – Das Spiel
- Ashlee Simpson – Pieces of Me
- Avril Lavigne – Sk8er Boi
- Beyoncé – Crazy in Love
- The Black Eyed Peas – Shut Up
- Blink 182 – What's My Age Again?
- The Dandy Warhols – Bohemian Like You
- Die Fantastischen Vier – Geboren
- Good Charlotte – I Just Wanna Live
- Hoobastank – The Reason
- Jamelia – Stop
- Joss Stone – Super Duper Love
- Keane – Somewhere Only We Know
- Kylie Minogue – In Your Eyes
- Laith Al-Deen – Alles An Dir
- Manfred Mann – Do Wah Diddy Diddy
- Martin Kesici – Angel of Berlin
- McFly – Obviously
- Natasha Bedingfield – These Words
- OutKast – Roses
- Pur – Abenteuerland
- Reamonn – Supergirl
- Robbie Williams – Let Me Entertain You
- Robbie Williams & Kylie Minogue – Kids
- Ronan Keating – Father and Son
- Rosenstolz – Willkommen
- Sister Sledge – We Are Family
- Steppenwolf – Born to Be Wild
- Tom Jones – It's Not Unusual
- The Clash – Should I Stay or Should I Go
