= Wir sind am Leben =

Studio album by Rosenstolz
- Released: 23 September 2011
- Recorded: February 2009 – July 2011
- Studio: Praxis (Berlin, Germany)
- Genre: Pop
- Language: German
- Label: Island (Universal)
- Producer: Daniel Faust, Ulf Leo Sommer, Peter Plate

Rosenstolz chronology
Die Suche geht weiter live (2009)	Wir sind am Leben (2011)

Singles from Wir sind am Leben
- 1. "Wir sind am Leben" Released: 9 September 2011; 2. "Lied von den Vergessenen" / "Wie lang kann ein Mensch tanzen?" Released: 10 February 2012

Wir sind am Leben (We are alive) is the twelfth and final studio album by German pop duo Rosenstolz. Released in 2011 by Island Records, the album reached No. 1 in the German and Austrian albums charts and No. 3 in the Swiss albums chart.

== Background ==
The release of Wir sind am Leben in September 2011 marked Rosenstolz's comeback following the premature end to the band's concert tour in January 2009, which was caused by musician Peter Plate of Rosenstolz suffering from burnout. During Rosenstolz's break of nearly three years, Plate and songwriting partner Ulf Leo Sommer worked individually on new songs, asking singer AnNa R. of Rosenstolz to provide vocals. Each song was recorded separately as its own entity and it was only later that the band realized that the songs went well together and could form an album. The entire album was produced without the pressure of having to meet a deadline. In an interview before the release of Wir sind am Leben, Plate stated that it was important that the band made a positive album and looked forward.

In contrast to Rosenstolz's last two studio albums, Wir sind am Leben contains a mix of calmer songs and more uptempo songs. The album also includes collaborations with other artists. For the song Überdosis Glück, Rosenstolz wanted to use the sound of real horns and approached German reggae/dancehall band Seeed to provide this. In the case of Beautiful, Rosenstolz asked Australian singer-songwriter Scott Matthew to add a positive end to what is a sad song by singing the mantra from his song German.

== Release ==
Three different editions of Wir sind am Leben were released on 23 September 2011. The first contains a CD with 11 songs, and the second is a deluxe version which contains the same CD plus a bonus DVD including the mini-musical Irgendwo in Berlin (featuring some of the songs from the album). The third is a limited edition super deluxe version: besides the aforementioned CD and DVD, this version includes a bonus CD containing demo songs, a bonus CD/cassette containing demo recordings from 1991, and a canvas print.

Two songs from Wir sind am Leben were released as singles: Wir sind am Leben and Lied von den Vergessenen. Both were hits in Germany, reaching No. 3 and No. 27, respectively, in the singles chart.

== Critical reception ==
In a review in German daily national newspaper Süddeutsche Zeitung, Tobias Dorfer indicated that Wir sind am Leben was not a blockbuster album: while all the songs were catchy and well produced, there were, however, no genuinely catchy songs as found on previous Rosenstolz albums. A brief review in German regional newspaper Westdeutsche Zeitung described the sound of Wir sind am Leben as unmistakably Rosenstolz, with the album containing melancholic moments, huge anthems and tender ballads. Leonie Schwarzer of German women's magazine AVIVA-Berlin wrote that Rosenstolz had stayed true to themselves and conjured up another album full of deep emotions and poetic lyrics.

== Track listing ==
The songs of Wir sind am Leben were written by Peter Plate, Ulf Leo Sommer, Daniel Faust and Scott Matthew as indicated.

1. "Wir sind am Leben" (Plate, Sommer)
2. "Überdosis Glück" (Plate, Sommer)
3. "Lied von den Vergessenen" (Plate, Sommer)
4. "Sprachlos" (Plate, Sommer)
5. "Mein Leben im Aschenbecher" (Plate)
6. "Marilyn" (Plate)
7. "Wir küssen Amok" (Plate)
8. "E.N.E.R.G.I.E." (Plate)
9. "Flugzeug" (Plate, Sommer)
10. "Irgendwo in Berlin" (Plate, Sommer)
11. "Beautiful" (Sommer, Faust, Matthew)

Bonus songs (super deluxe version, demo songs)

1. "Marilyn (Demo)"
2. "Lied von den Vergessenen (Demo)"
3. "Was willst du sagen (Demo)"
4. "Electric Rain (Demo)"
5. "Aeronautics (Demo)"

Bonus songs (super deluxe version, 1991 demo songs)

1. "Ich geh' jetzt aus (sonst geh' ich ein)"
2. "Zauberstern"
3. "Anna Galaktika"
4. "Wunderwelt"
5. "Illusion"
6. "Frühling"
7. "Bunte Herzen"
8. "Schlampenfieber"
9. "Ödenreich"
10. "Durchgedreht"
11. "Niemals, niemals mit dir"
12. "Komm zurück"
13. "Dann & wann"

== Charts and certifications ==
=== Weekly charts ===
Chart (2011)	Peak position
Austrian Albums (Ö3 Austria)	1
German Albums (Offizielle Top 100)	1
Swiss Albums (Schweizer Hitparade)	3

=== Year-end charts ===
Chart (2011)	Position
Austrian Albums (Ö3 Austria)	34
German Albums (Offizielle Top 100)	6
Swiss Albums (Schweizer Hitparade)	93

=== Certifications ===
Region	Certification	Certified units/sales
Austria (IFPI Austria)	Gold	10,000^{*}
Germany (BVMI)	3× Gold	300,000^{^}
^{*} Sales figures based on certification alone.^{^} Shipments figures based on certification alone.
