= Alles Gute =

- Front cover of original 1998 release

Compilation album by Rosenstolz
- Released: April 1998
- Genre: Pop, rock, chanson
- Length: 72:56
- Language: German
- Label: Polydor

Rosenstolz chronology
Raritäten (1997)	Alles Gute (1998)	Zucker (1999)

Alternative cover
- Front cover of 2001 re-release

Alles Gute (All the best) is a compilation album by German pop duo Rosenstolz, featuring a selection of songs from the early part of the band's career during the nineties. Following its initial release in 1998 by Polydor Records, the album reached No. 10 in the German albums chart. The album was later re-released in 2001 with a bonus CD containing newer songs.

== Release history ==
Alles Gute was first released in April 1998, containing songs from Rosenstolz's first five studio albums: Soubrette werd' ich nie (1992), Nur einmal noch (1994), Mittwoch is' er fällig (1995), Objekt der Begierde (1996) and Die Schlampen sind müde (1997). New songs were "Herzensschöner", which had previously been released as a single in 1998, "Lass sie reden" and "Süßer Vogel". Another song, "Nur einmal noch '98", is a remix of the original version from 1994.

The album was re-released in December 2001 as Alles Gute – Die Goldedition – Das Beste von 92 bis 01 with an updated album cover and a bonus CD containing five newer songs. The additional tracks originate from the studio albums Zucker (1999) and Kassengift (2000) and from the single "Es könnt' ein Anfang sein" (2001). Two of the bonus songs are re-recordings of the original studio-album versions: "Amo Vitam", which features English singer Marc Almond on vocals, and "Mon ange de tristesse", which is the French version of "Engel der Schwermut". The re-released album received gold status even before its official release owing to the pre-order of 150,000 copies.

The original single-CD version of Alles Gute was re-released in December 2004 with the new title Alles Gute – Das Beste von 92 bis 98. In addition, the original album cover was replaced with that for Alles Gute – Die Goldedition – Das Beste von 92 bis 01.

== Critical reception ==
In her review of the 2001 re-release, Andrea Vetter of German music magazine laut.de stated that, while the album was superfluous for die-hard Rosenstolz fans, it was ideal for convincing sceptical friends of the quality of Rosenstolz. Felix Kosel of German music magazine bloom also reviewed the 2001 re-release and remarked that the compilation showed the band's development, with the increasing use of electronic sounds displacing the raw guitar sound heard on "Nur einmal noch". In addition, although he did not feel that Rosenstolz's music had become more mainstream, he did sense a gradual disappearance of the band's indefinable quirky touch over time.

== Track listing ==
1. "Herzensschöner" – 3:02
2. "Nur einmal noch '98" – 3:18
3. "Königin" – 3:20
4. "Die Schlampen sind müde" – 4:34
5. "Lachen" – 4:20
6. "Die Zigarette danach" – 3:20
7. "Nymphoman" – 3:39
8. "Schlampenfieber" – 2:58
9. "Ich geh auf Glas" – 3:53
10. "Der Moment" – 3:35
11. "Süßer Vogel" – 4:20
12. "Sex im Hotel" – 3:06
13. "Soubrette werd' ich nie" – 3:40
14. "Alles wird besser" – 5:17
15. "Objekt der Begierde" – 3:03
16. "Lass sie reden" – 4:37
17. "Sei mein Gott" – 4:29
18. "Wenn du jetzt aufgibst" – 5:23
19. "Juni (Herzensschöner)" – 3:02

Bonus CD

1. "Es könnt' ein Anfang sein (long version)"
2. "Bastard"
3. "Fütter deine Angst"
4. "Amo Vitam [Rosenstolz + Marc Almond]"
5. "Mon ange de tristesse"

== Charts and certifications ==
Charts

Chart (1998)	Peak position
German Albums (Offizielle Top 100)	10

=== Year-end charts ===
Chart (1998)	Position
German Albums Chart	60

Certifications

Region	Certification
Germany (BVMI)	Gold
