= Macht Liebe =

Studio album by Rosenstolz
- Released: 9 September 2002
- Recorded: Freudenhaus Studio, Audio Tonstudios, The Werkstatt, Bleibtreustudios, Saal 2
- Genres: Pop, rock, chanson
- Length: 46:33
- Language: German
- Label: Polydor (Universal)
- Producers: Patrik Majer, Peter Plate, Ulf Leo Sommer

Rosenstolz chronology
| Raritäten II (2000) | Macht Liebe (2002) | Live aus Berlin (2003) |

Singles from Macht Liebe
- 1. "Sternraketen" / "Macht Liebe" Released: 19 August 2002; 2. "Es tut immer noch weh" Released: 25 November 2002

Macht Liebe (meaning either "Power – love" or "Make love") is the eighth studio album by German pop duo Rosenstolz, released in 2002 by Polydor Records. Featuring a mix of electropop and ballads, the album reached gold status in Germany.

== Composition ==
A change in Rosenstolz's musical style can be found in Macht Liebe, with the album containing electropop songs influenced by the Neue Deutsche Welle (New German Wave), such as "Sternraketen", "Macht Liebe" and "Paradies". According to musician Peter Plate of Rosenstolz, the electronic influences in the album were due in part to nostalgia, the band having attempted to make purely electropop at the start of its career. Plate had stumbled across some demo tapes made by Rosenstolz in 1991 and, feeling enthusiastic about the tapes, decided it was time for the band to have another go at electropop. Plate also stated that the idea behind "Sternraketen" was to pay a small homage to the Neue Deutsche Welle era. In addition to the electropop songs, Macht Liebe also contains ballads, such as "Es tut immer noch weh" and "Prinzessin auf dem Abstellgleis".

Some of the songs in Macht Liebe were written by Rosenstolz in cooperation with other artists. These songs include "Macht Liebe", which was co-written by Inga Humpe, the singer from German pop duo 2raumwohnung, and "Es tut immer noch weh", which was co-written by Ralf Lübke, Rosenstolz's live guitarist.

== Release ==
Macht Liebe was released on 9 September 2002. In addition to the standard album, there was also a limited edition album.

Two singles were released from Macht Liebe. The first was the double single "Sternraketen" / "Macht Liebe", which came out before the album and peaked at No. 11 in the German singles chart. The second single was "Es tut immer noch weh", which was released a few months after the album came out and reached No. 21 in the German singles chart.

Following the release of Macht Liebe, Rosenstolz went on a concert tour between 1 November 2002 and 21 December 2002. All the concerts were performed at venues within Germany. Six concerts were given in the Columbiahalle (Columbia Hall) in Berlin, where Rosenstolz's live performance was recorded. This recording was later released on CD and DVD in 2003 as the live album Live aus Berlin.

== Critical reception ==
Linus Schwanke of German music magazine laut.de commented that Macht Liebe was a wonderful album with much to discover. Felix Kosel of German music magazine bloom was tempted to say that Macht Liebe was the best Rosenstolz album so far and described it as being novel, refreshing, emotional, danceable, melancholic, varied and still typical Rosenstolz. Anja Kesting of German women's magazine AVIVA-Berlin talked of the varied and high-octane sound of Macht Liebe.

== Track listing ==
Songs were written by Peter Plate, Ulf Leo Sommer, AnNa R., Inga Humpe, Ralf Lübke and Patrik Majer as indicated.

1. "Sternraketen" (Plate, Sommer, AnNa R.) – 4:06
2. "Macht Liebe" (Plate, Humpe, Sommer, AnNa R.) – 3:56
3. "Paradies" (Plate, Humpe, Sommer, AnNa R.) – 4:51
4. "Es tut immer noch weh" (Plate, Lübke, Sommer, AnNa R.) – 4:13
5. "Komm doch mit" (Plate, Sommer, AnNa R.) – 3:22
6. "Heiss" (Plate, Majer, Sommer, AnNa R.) – 3:28
7. "Ich verbrauche mich" (Plate, Sommer, AnNa R.) – 4:18
8. "Unsterblich" (Plate, Sommer, AnNa R.) – 3:16
9. "Raubtier" (Plate, Lübke, Sommer, AnNa R.) – 4:39
10. "48 Stunden" (Plate, Sommer, AnNa R.) – 3:45
11. "Prinzessin auf dem Abstellgleis" (Plate, Sommer, AnNa R.) – 3:54
12. "Tag in Berlin (November)" (Plate, Sommer, AnNa R.) – 2:45

== Charts and certifications ==
=== Weekly charts ===
| Chart (20029) | Peak position |
|---|---|
| Austrian Albums (Ö3 Austria) | 51 |
| German Albums (Offizielle Top 100) | 3 |

=== Year-end charts ===
| Chart (2002) | Position |
|---|---|
| German Albums (Offizielle Top 100) | 89 |

=== Certifications ===
| Region | Certification |
|---|---|
| Germany (BVMI) | Gold |
