= Kassengift =

Studio album by Rosenstolz
- Released: 4 September 2000
- Recorded: July 1999 – June 2000
- Studios: Audio Ton Studios (Berlin, Germany); Chameleon Studios (Hamburg, Germany); CTS Studios (London, England)
- Genres: Pop, chanson
- Length: 55:40
- Languages: German, Latin, English
- Label: Polydor (Universal)
- Producers: Peter Plate, Patrik Majer, Ulf Leo Sommer

Rosenstolz chronology
Zucker-schlampen:live (1999)	Kassengift (2000)	Stolz der Rose – Das Beste und mehr (2000)

Singles from Kassengift
- 1. "Amo Vitam" Released: 21 August 2000; 2. "Kinder der Nacht" Released: 20 November 2000; 3. "Total Eclipse" / "Die schwarze Witwe" Released: 5 March 2001

Kassengift (Box-office poison) is the seventh studio album by German pop duo Rosenstolz, released in 2000 by Polydor Records. The album was the first Rosenstolz album to reach No. 1 in the German albums chart and includes "Amo Vitam", a song sung entirely in Latin that reached the top 20 of the German singles chart.

== Composition ==
The title song of Kassengift is about the music business. In an interview, musician Peter Plate of Rosenstolz stated that the word Kassengift was taken from the biography of German actress Marlene Dietrich, where it was used to describe the actress during her period of lack of commercial success (box-office poison). He added that the song reflected Rosenstolz's own experiences, with the band being ignored by the media despite achieving sell-out concerts and significant album sales. The song includes the lines "Ich bin der Song, der nie gespielt wird / Ich bin das Video, das nicht läuft" ("I am the song which is never played / I am the video which does not get shown").

Other songs of the album are of a private nature. The song "Achterbahn" was written by Plate following a state of panic in his flat which caused him to shout "Ich kann nicht mehr! Ich will nicht mehr!" ("I can't go on any longer! I want to end it all!"). These words are sung at the start of the song. Another song, "Amo Vitam", initially contained the lines "Ich liebe das Leben, ich liebe den Sex, doch warum bin ich einsam?" ("I love life, I love sex, but why am I lonely?"). The lines, written by Plate, were translated into Latin for the final produced song by a friend with the help of his former Latin teacher. Latin was used because Plate felt that the language sounded very dramatic.

The album also includes the cover song "Total Eclipse", which was originally sung by German singer Klaus Nomi. Plate and singer AnNa R. of Rosenstolz discovered that they were both fans of Nomi when they first met, and since the formation of their band, they had talked about recording a cover version of "Total Eclipse".

== Release ==
Kassengift was released on 4 September 2000 and re-released on 4 November 2002. In addition, two songs from the album were released as singles in 2000: "Amo Vitam" and "Kinder der Nacht". They reached No. 19 and No. 63, respectively, in the German singles chart.

Two further songs from Kassengift were re-recorded in collaboration with guest singers: "Total Eclipse", featuring English singer Marc Almond, and "Die schwarze Witwe", featuring German singer Nina Hagen. The songs were released together in 2001 as a double single (two different editions released) and reached No. 22 in the German singles chart.

The collaboration with Almond occurred after he received a copy of Kassengift from a journalist. Enthusiastic about the album, Almond contacted Rosenstolz a few days later and it was decided that they should meet. Together, they re-recorded not only "Total Eclipse", but also "Amo Vitam", which appears on the Rosenstolz compilation album Alles Gute – Die Goldedition (2001). For the other collaboration, Hagen was approached by Rosenstolz, who felt that "Die schwarze Witwe" was tailor-made for the singer.

Immediately following the release of Kassengift, Rosenstolz went on a concert tour, which took place from 26 September 2000 to 25 November 2000. The first concert was held in Vienna and the second in Zurich. The concert tour then continued in Germany and included four concerts in Berlin in the Columbiahalle (Columbia Hall).

== Reception ==
Kassengift went straight to No. 1 in the German albums chart and this coincided with music television stations MTV and VIVA starting to regularly play Rosenstolz's music. This took AnNa R. and Plate by surprise, who remarked that they had spent six years trying to crack the music stations. The accompanying concert tour was a sell-out, and in a review of one of the Berlin concerts, Felix Kosel of German music magazine bloom commented that the band's gay audience had become a more diverse audience.

Kassengift was positively received by German music magazine laut.de. Finding elements of pop, trance and opera in the album, the magazine praised Rosenstolz for being unconventional and innovative.

== Track listing ==
All songs were written by Peter Plate, AnNa R. and Ulf Leo Sommer, except where indicated.

1. "Kassengift" – 3:55
2. "Bastard" – 5:31
3. "Kinder der Nacht" – 5:21
4. "Amo Vitam" – 3:32
5. "Septembergrau" – 4:40
6. "Achterbahn" – 4:30
7. "Es ist vorbei" – 4:02
8. "Engel der Schwermut" – 4:29
9. "Du atmest nicht" – 3:33
10. "Total Eclipse" (Kristian Hoffman) – 4:02
11. "Die schwarze Witwe" – 3:53
12. "Sag doch" – 4:20
13. "Mir grauts vor diesen Leuten" – 3:52

== Charts and certifications ==
=== Weekly charts ===
Chart (2000)	Peak position
German Albums (Offizielle Top 100)	1

=== Year-end charts ===
Chart (2000)	Position
German Albums (Offizielle Top 100)	72

=== Certifications ===
Region	Certification	Certified units/sales
Germany (BVMI)	Gold	150,000^{^}
^{^} Shipments figures based on certification alone.
