= Willkommen in unserer Welt =

Video by Rosenstolz
- Released: 8 November 2004
- Recorded: 12 June 2004
- Venue: Kindl-Bühne Wuhlheide (Berlin, Germany)
- Genre: Pop, rock, chanson
- Length: Approx. 120:40
- Language: German
- Label: Island (Universal)

Rosenstolz chronology
Herz (2004)	Willkommen in unserer Welt (2004)	Das große Leben (2006)

Willkommen in unserer Welt (Welcome to our world) is a live video album by German pop duo Rosenstolz, released on DVD in 2004 by Island Records. The recording was done during the band's 2004 Herz tour at the final concert, which took place at Kindl-Bühne Wuhlheide, an open-air venue in Berlin.

== Critical reception ==
Nicole Mons of German music magazine laut.de compared Willkommen in unserer Welt favourably with Live aus Berlin (2003), Rosenstolz's previous live video album. She wrote that whereas the latter had been recorded inside a hall in front of 3500 fans, the former raised the bar by showing an outdoor concert with 17,000 fans in attendance.

Felix Kosel of German music magazine bloom praised the production quality of the album. Positive aspects for him were the short introduction showing the immediate events leading up to the start of the concert as well as the integration of elements from a film with live concert footage. In addition, he remarked that Rosenstolz had taken a small step back to the band's roots by digging out old songs and that these songs had been reworked.

Anja Kesting of German women's magazine AVIVA-Berlin talked about songs which touched the heart and soul. Highlights of the concert for her were "Die Schlampen sind müde" and "Lachen", which were sung acoustically and had the entire audience participating by singing every word.

== Track listing ==
1. "Sternraketen"
2. "Alles wird besser"
3. "Eine Frage des Lichts"
4. "Es tut immer noch weh"
5. "Wenn Du aufwachst"
6. "Sex im Hotel"
7. "Das gelbe Monster"
8. "Die Schlampen sind müde"
9. "Lachen"
10. "Bastard"
11. "Schlampenfieber"
12. "Ausgesperrt"
13. "Die Zigarette danach"
14. "Ohne dich"
15. "Die Liebe ist tot"
16. "Es könnt' ein Anfang sein"
17. "Willkommen"
18. "Amo Vitam"
19. "Liebe ist alles"
20. "Ich will mich verlieben"
21. "Königin"
22. "Das Beste im Leben"
23. "Der Moment"
24. "Augenblick (Dezember)"

== Charts and certifications ==
=== Charts ===
Chart (2004)	Peak position
German Albums (Offizielle Top 100)	27

=== Certifications ===
Region	Certification	Certified units/sales
Germany (BVMI)	Platinum	50,000^{^}
^{^} Shipments figures based on certification alone.
