= Soubrette werd' ich nie =

Studio album by Rosenstolz
- Released: 1992
- Recorded: April – September 1992
- Studio: Hansa Studios (Berlin, Germany)
- Genre: Pop, chanson
- Length: 47:17
- Language: German
- Label: Pool
- Producer: Tom Müller

Rosenstolz chronology
Soubrette werd' ich nie (1992)	Nur einmal noch (1994)

Singles from Soubrette werd' ich nie
- 1. "Ich geh' auf Glas" Released: 20 August 1992; 2. "Schlampenfieber" Released: 17 May 1993

Soubrette werd' ich nie (I'll never become a soubrette) is the debut album by German pop duo Rosenstolz, released in 1992 by Pool. The album was not a commercial success following its initial release. However, the 2007 re-release reached No. 93 in the German albums chart.

== Background ==
Soubrette werd' ich nie was recorded at Hansa Studios in Berlin between April and September 1992. The producer was Tom Müller, who had previously worked with German singer Nina Hagen. He saw Rosenstolz performing in the Galerie Bellevue in Berlin and introduced himself to band members AnNa R. and Peter Plate after their performance, expressing his interest in working with them. Before the meeting with Müller, Rosenstolz had produced three different music cassettes at home, but these were not widely distributed.

One of the songs on the album, "Schlampenfieber", was originally written for the soundtrack for an independent film. However, the film was never made. The song later became a regular feature at Rosenstolz concerts, with the band performing the song in a different musical style for each new concert tour. "Schlampenfieber" was released as a single, as was "Ich geh' auf Glas", another song from Soubrette werd' ich nie. However, both failed to enter the German singles chart.

== Release ==
Soubrette werd' ich nie was first released in 1992 by indie record label Pool. The label also brought out a limited edition album (100 copies) featuring an alternative album cover. The album was then re-released in 1993 with a new album cover.

In 1996 and 2002, Soubrette werd' ich nie was re-released by Polydor Records. In these re-releases, the song "Königin" was omitted because Rosenstolz was working on a new version of the song for the band's 1997 album Die Schlampen sind müde. The 1996 and 2002 re-releases also do not contain the short voice recording at the end of the original album where AnNa R. asks "OK?" and someone replies "Prima!"

In 2007, a remastered edition of Soubrette werd' ich nie was released by Island Records. In this edition, the original version of "Königin" and the short voice recording were reinstated. A deluxe remastered edition was also released, which includes a bonus CD containing early demo songs and a bonus DVD showing early television appearances. In contrast to the earlier editions of the album, the 2007 re-release entered the German albums chart, reaching No. 93.

== Track listing ==
All songs were written by AnNa R. and Peter Plate, except "Bestes Stück" and "Bunte Herzen", which were written by Peter Plate.

1. "Soubrette werd' ich nie" – 3:43
2. "Ich geh' auf Glas" – 3:55
3. "Wenn du aufwachst" – 3:36
4. "Schlampenfieber" – 3:02
5. "Kosmos" – 3:04
6. "Januar (Wenn die Mona Lisa weint)" – 3:07
7. "Erwarten 'se nix" – 2:37
8. "Klaus-Trophobie" – 3:19
9. "Voyeur" – 2:49
10. "Ich geh' jetzt aus (sonst geh' ich ein)" – 3:11
11. "Magnetisch" – 2:32
12. "Stolz der Rose" – 3:13
13. "Süchtig" – 2:53
14. "Königin" – 3:16
15. "Ich geh' auf Glas (Die Andere)" – 3:00

Bonus CD (included in 2007 deluxe edition)

1. "Diva" – 3:29
2. "AnNa Galaktika" – 2:47
3. "Durchgedreht" – 2:43
4. "Frühling" – 2:11
5. "Niemehr niemals mit dir" – 2:48
6. "Sinne nähmst" – 2:37
7. "Bestes Stück" – 2:53
8. "Ödenreich" – 2:29
9. "Bunte Herzen" – 2:27
10. "Schlampenfieber" – 2:22
11. "Ich leg dich flach" – 2:56
