= Herz (album) =

Studio album by Rosenstolz
- Released: 22 March 2004
- Recorded: January – December 2003
- Studios: Home Studio (Hamburg, Germany)
- Genres: Pop, rock
- Length: 47:52
- Language: German
- Label: Island (Universal)
- Producers: Ulf Leo Sommer, Peter Plate

Rosenstolz chronology
| Live aus Berlin (2003) | Herz (2004) | Willkommen in unserer Welt (2004) |

Singles from Herz
- 1. "Liebe ist alles" Released: 1 March 2004; 2. "Ich will mich verlieben" Released: 14 June 2004; 3. "Willkommen" Released: 13 September 2004; 4. "Ich komm an dir nicht weiter" Released: 22 November 2004

Herz (Heart) is the ninth studio album by German pop duo Rosenstolz, containing songs representing the different sides of love. Released in 2004 by Island Records, the album reached triple platinum status in Germany. It also yielded four top 20 hits in the German singles chart.

== Composition ==
Herz deals with the various aspects of love, including happiness, sex and partnership ("Liebe ist alles"), pain ("Die Liebe ist tot"), loss, sorrow and hope ("Gib mir mehr Himmel"), and jealousy ("Das gelbe Monster"). Speaking in an interview before the release of Herz, Rosenstolz described the new album as being the band's most personal to date. The band had not originally intended to make such an album, but after having written the first two songs, "Die Liebe ist tot" and "Ich will mich verlieben", felt that both songs were of such a personal nature that it would not have been appropriate to complete the album with less personal songs.

A range of song styles can be found in Herz, from ballads ("Liebe ist alles" or "Gib mir mehr Himmel") to pop ("Ich komm an dir nicht weiter") and rock ("Eine Frage des Lichts"). Speaking in an interview, musician Peter Plate of Rosenstolz revealed that English singer Beth Gibbons of English band Portishead and French singer Benjamin Biolay were a major influence on Herz and that the album was generally influenced by French pop music. In a later interview in 2008, Plate remarked that Herz was the start of the second phase of Rosenstolz, forming a trilogy with Das große Leben (2006), the band's tenth studio album, and Die Suche geht weiter (2008), the band's eleventh studio album.

== Release ==
Herz was released on 22 March 2004, and this was followed on 8 November 2004 by an expanded edition of the album containing five bonus songs. In addition, two limited edition albums were released, the first on 22 March 2004 and the second on 18 November 2005.

Four songs from Herz were released as singles: "Liebe ist alles", "Ich will mich verlieben", "Willkommen" and "Ich komm an dir nicht weiter". They reached No. 6, No. 8, No. 8 and No. 14, respectively, in the German singles chart.

== Video album ==
A video edition of Herz was also made, featuring a short film for each of the 12 songs of the album. The films were produced by Berlin production company Hans & Grete and starred Rosenstolz as well as German actors Nora Tschirner, Anna Bertheau, Franz Dinda and Axel Schreiber. The album was released on DVD on 19 April 2004 and was later certified gold in Germany.

== Concert tour and live album ==
At the same time as the release of Herz, Rosenstolz went on a two-month concert tour, which started on 15 April 2004 in the Columbiahalle (Columbia Hall) in Berlin and ended on 12 June 2004 at Kindl-Bühne Wuhlheide, an open-air venue in Berlin. The tour covered various cities in Germany as well as Vienna and Zurich. The last concert at Kindl-Bühne Wuhlheide was recorded and released on DVD as the live video album Willkommen in unserer Welt (2004). Later in 2004, Rosenstolz went on a second tour in November and December.

== Critical reception ==
In his review of Herz, Linus Schwanke of German music magazine laut.de complimented Rosenstolz on always being able to come up with something new and praised the band's creativity, self-will and positive energy. The editorial team at German women's magazine AVIVA-Berlin were unanimous in their opinion that Herz was Rosenstolz's best and most personal album to date. Johannes Mihram of German music magazine bloom commented that Herz was both the most rocking and most intimate album by Rosenstolz.

== Notable songs ==
- "Willkommen", one of the songs from Herz, was used as the title song for the 2004 German film Sommersturm (Summer Storm). Scenes from the film can be seen in the music video for "Willkommen".
- "Liebe ist alles", another song from Herz, was covered by French singer Grégory Lemarchal. His cover version is titled "Je Deviens Moi" and it appears in his 2005 album of the same name.
- In 2011, Plate co-produced Melanie C's cover version of "Liebe ist alles". The English singer's cover version is titled "Let There Be Love" and can be found in her 2011 album The Sea (German, Swiss, Austrian, East European & Scandinavian edition).

== Track listing ==
All songs were written by Peter Plate, Ulf Leo Sommer and AnNa R., except where indicated.

1. "Willkommen" – 4:19
2. "Liebe ist alles" – 3:29
3. "Ausgesperrt" – 4:06
4. "Eine Frage des Lichts" – 3:47
5. "Das gelbe Monster" – 2:22
6. "Die Liebe ist tot" – 3:41
7. "Ich will mich verlieben" – 4:38
8. "In den Sand gesetzt" – 2:34
9. "Ich komm an dir nicht weiter" – 4:40
10. "Das Beste im Leben" – 5:27
11. "Gib mir mehr Himmel" – 4:34
12. "Augenblick (Dezember)" – 4:15

Bonus songs

13. "Der größte Trick" – 4:46
14. "Alles über uns" (co-writer: Ralf Lübke) – 3:27
15. "Ohne dich" (Christian Neander, Jan Plewka) – 4:47
16. "Ausgesperrt bei Nacht" – 4:21
17. "Als ich fortging" (Dirk Michaelis, Gisela Steineckert) – 2:36

== Charts and certifications ==
=== Weekly charts ===
| Chart (2004) | Peak position |
|---|---|
| Austrian Albums (Ö3 Austria) | 20 |
| German Albums (Offizielle Top 100) | 1 |
| Swiss Albums (Schweizer Hitparade) | 55 |

=== Year-end charts ===
| Chart (2004) | Position |
|---|---|
| German Albums (Offizielle Top 100) | 3 |
| Chart (2005) | Position |
| German Albums (Offizielle Top 100) | 77 |

=== Certifications ===
| Region | Certification | Certified units/sales |
|---|---|---|
| Germany (BVMI) | 3× Platinum | 600,000^{^} |
^{^} Shipments figures based on certification alone.
