= Gleis 8 =

German pop group

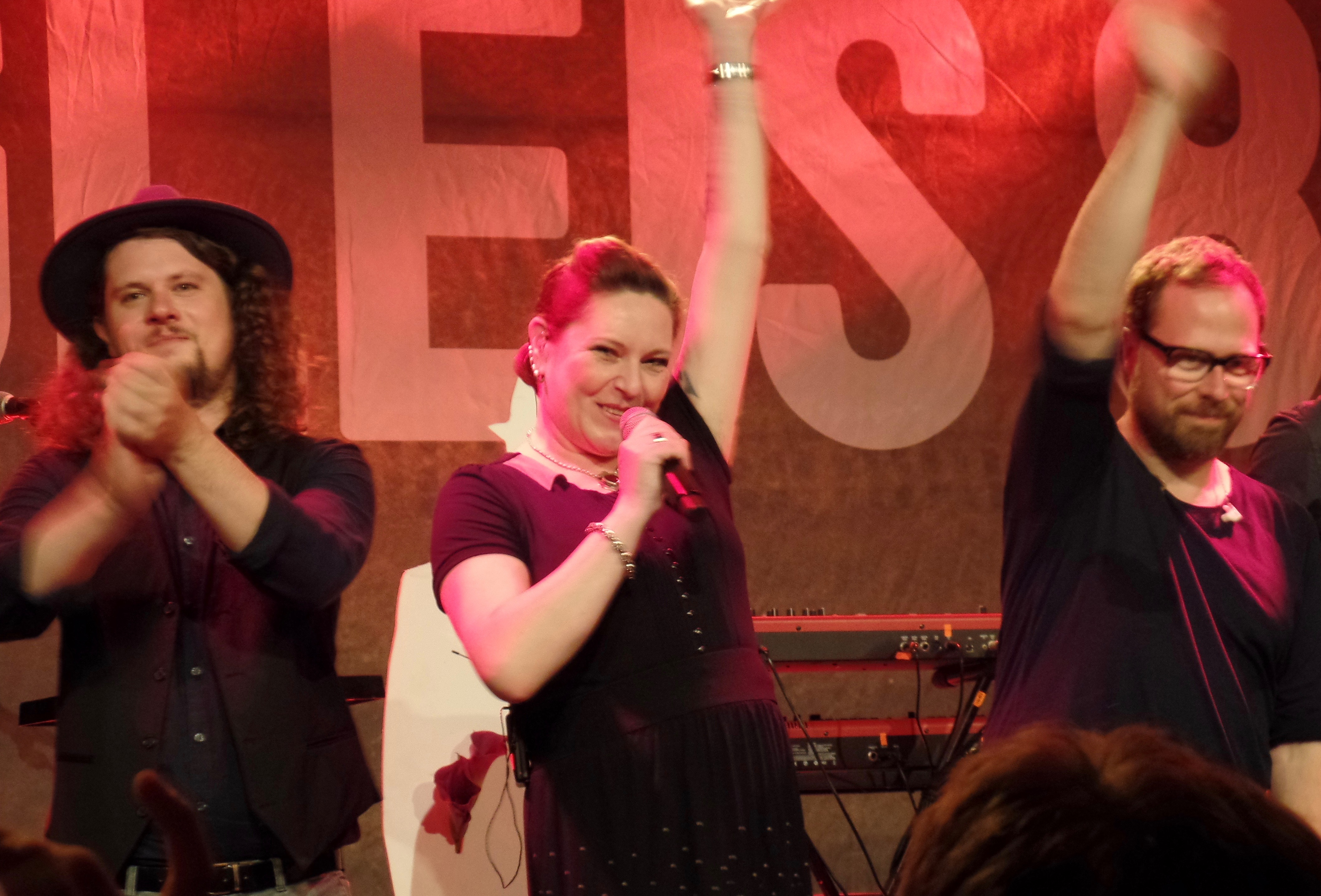

Background information
- Origin: Berlin/Hamburg, Germany
- Genres: Pop, rock
- Years active: 2012–present
- Label: Island (Universal)
- Members: Lorenz Allacher; Timo Dorsch; Manne Uhlig
- Past members: AnNa R. (deceased)
- Website: www.gleis8.net (in German)

Gleis 8 is a German pop group from Berlin and Hamburg that was formed in 2012. Their debut album Bleibt das immer so (2013) reached No. 7 in the German albums chart.

== History ==
Gleis 8 was formed by AnNa R., the singer from German pop duo Rosenstolz, and musicians Lorenz Allacher, Timo Dorsch and Manne Uhlig. The initial idea to work together came at AnNa R.'s birthday party in December 2011, and the four band members had their first music session in January 2012. They already knew each other for a long time prior to the formation of the band. Because AnNa R. and Allacher live in Berlin and Dorsch and Uhlig live in Hamburg, they named their band Gleis 8 (Platform 8), the platform at Berlin Hauptbahnhof (Berlin main station) from which trains to Hamburg depart.

AnNa R. had described the music of Gleis 8 as being pop music in the broadest sense. She had also stated that the band's music differs from that of Rosenstolz in that it is more upbeat and multifaceted and uses more guitars and real instruments. The band's debut album Bleibt das immer so, which was produced by Dorsch, was released in May 2013 and charted in Germany, Austria and Switzerland.

Gleis 8 gave their first live performances at the Astra Kulturhaus in Berlin-Friedrichshain in June 2013. The concerts took place on 25, 26, 28 and 29 June, with the first three concerts being sold out. Later that summer, they made an appearance in Wismar as one of the performing acts of the 2013 summer tour organized by German broadcaster NDR. At the end of 2013, Gleis 8 went on their first nationwide concert tour (the Bleibt das immer so tour), which took place over November and December and covered 12 cities in Germany.

AnNa R. died in Berlin on or before March 16, 2025, aged 55.

== Band members ==
=== Current members ===
- Timo Dorsch – multiple instruments
- Manne Uhlig – drums

=== Former members ===
- Lorenz Allacher – multiple instruments (deceased)
- AnNa R. – lead vocals (deceased)

== Discography ==
=== Studio albums ===
Title	Album details	Peak chart positions			Certifications
Title	Album details	GER	AUT	SWI	Certifications
Bleibt das immer so	Released: 24 May 2013; Label: Island (Universal Music Group); Formats: CD, digital download, vinyl	7	44	80	—
Endlich	Released: 12 February 2016; Label: Island (Universal Music Group); Formats: CD, digital download, vinyl	6	—	60	—

=== Singles ===
Year	Title	Peak chart positions			Album
Year	Title	GER	AUT	SWI	Album
2013	"Wer ich bin"	70	—	—	Bleibt das immer so
2013	"Geh nicht"	—	—	—	Bleibt das immer so
2015	"Vorbei"	—	—	—	
2015	"Dunkelrot"	—	—	—	
2016	"Trotzdem"	—	—	—	
"—" denotes single that did not chart or was not released.
