= Das große Leben =

Studio album by Rosenstolz
- Released: 3 March 2006
- Recorded: January – December 2005
- Studio: Gaga Tonstudio (Hamburg, Germany); Praxis Dr. Dan; Bleibtreu Studio; Teldex Studio (Berlin, Germany); VOX Klangstudio (Bendestorf, Germany)
- Genre: Pop
- Language: German
- Label: Island (Universal)
- Producer: Ulf Leo Sommer, Peter Plate, Daniel Faust

Rosenstolz chronology
Willkommen in unserer Welt (2004)	Das große Leben (2006)	Das große Leben live (2006)

Singles from Das große Leben
- 1. "Ich bin ich (Wir sind wir)" Released: 10 February 2006; 2. "Nichts von alledem (tut mir leid)" Released: 26 May 2006; 3. "Ich geh in Flammen auf" / "Das Glück liegt auf der Straße" Released: 1 September 2006; 4. "Auch im Regen" / "Mein Sex" Released: 10 November 2006; 5. "Aus Liebe wollt ich alles wissen" Released: 23 March 2007

Das große Leben (The great life) is the tenth studio album by German pop duo Rosenstolz, released in 2006 by Island Records. Consisting mostly of ballads, the album topped the German and Austrian albums charts and became Rosenstolz's biggest selling album, with over one million copies sold. Five singles from the album were top 20 hits in Germany.

== Background ==
Das große Leben was recorded by AnNa R. and Peter Plate of Rosenstolz during their one-year break from public appearances. In an interview at the time of the album's release, Plate revealed that the album was Rosenstolz's most private to date: "Denn im vergangenen Jahr konnten wir zu uns selbst zurückfinden und dann mit den neuen Liedern das erste Mal formulieren, was so wichtig ist und doch so schwer fällt – zu sagen: ich liebe mich selbst. Mit allen Zweifeln." ("Because we could rediscover ourselves in the past year and then express with the new songs for the first time what is very important and yet does not come very easily – to say: 'I love myself. With all doubts.'")

In another interview, Plate stated that friendship and strong bonds were the main themes of Das große Leben. In a further interview, AnNa R. compared Herz (2004), the band's previous studio album, with Das große Leben, declaring that the former was more upbeat, whereas the latter was more melancholic, but hopeful. Plate added that the idea behind the album's title (which literally means "The great life") was to indicate the enormity of each life.

In contrast to previous Rosenstolz studio albums, Das große Leben consists almost entirely of ballads. At first, AnNa R. and Plate were unsure about this bias. However, after playing their new songs to close friends, they received encouragement to continue with the album in this direction. To get back to basics, the album was recorded on analogue tapes. In addition, all instruments and vocals were recorded simultaneously to achieve the effect of a live atmosphere.

== Release ==
Two editions of Das große Leben were released on 3 March 2006: a standard edition with 12 songs, and a limited deluxe edition with the same 12 songs plus a bonus DVD. On 24 November 2006, two further editions of the album were released: one containing the original 12 songs plus 7 bonus songs, and the other containing these 19 songs plus a bonus DVD.

Five songs from the album were released as singles: "Ich bin ich (Wir sind wir)", "Nichts von alledem (tut mir leid)", "Ich geh in Flammen auf", "Auch im Regen" and "Aus Liebe wollt ich alles wissen". They all entered the top 20 of the German singles chart, whereas "Ich bin ich (Wir sind wir)" was a top 20 hit in the Austrian and Swiss singles charts. "Aus Liebe wollt ich alles wissen" was a charity song to raise money for the Deutsche AIDS-Stiftung (German AIDS foundation).

Das große Leben was the biggest selling album in Germany in 2006. Since its release in March 2006, the album stayed uninterrupted in the German albums chart for over a year, including four weeks at No. 1, and eventually sold over one million copies.

== Concert tour and live album ==
Following the release of Das große Leben, Rosenstolz went on a concert tour that took place in over 30 venues in Germany, Austria and Switzerland between April and September 2006. The concert in Arena Leipzig was recorded and released as the live album Das große Leben live (2006), which was also made available as a DVD video album. The live recording includes ten songs from Das große Leben: "Ich geh in Flammen auf", "Auch im Regen", "Aus Liebe wollt ich alles wissen", "Ich hab genauso Angst wie du", "Ein Wunder für mich", "Ich bin verändert", "Nichts von alledem (tut mir leid)", "Ich bin ich (Wir sind wir)", "Anders als geplant" and "Etwas zerstört".

== Critical reception ==
A positive review of Das große Leben was given by Harald Peters of German national daily newspaper Die Welt, who commented that the album contained exclusively mid-tempo piano-saturated guitar pop, lacking the aspects of Rosenstolz's sound that had previously often made the band's music unbearable. Furthermore, Felix Kosel of German music magazine bloom described Das große Leben as a very intimate, emotional album and praised the range of emotions shown by AnNa R.'s voice.

However, Das große Leben was poorly received by Artur Schulz of German music magazine laut.de, who found the album uninspired, trite and banal in contrast to previous Rosenstolz albums. In addition, Sebastian Handke of German daily newspaper Der Tagesspiegel found the album's lyrics sentimental and simplistic.

== Track listing ==
All songs were written by Peter Plate, Ulf Leo Sommer and AnNa R., except where indicated.

1. "Nichts von alledem (tut mir leid)"
2. "Ich bin ich (Wir sind wir)"
3. "Anders als geplant"
4. "Ich geh in Flammen auf"
5. "Ein Wunder für mich"
6. "Auch im Regen"
7. "Ich bin verändert"
8. "Bester Feind"
9. "Ich hab genauso Angst wie du"
10. "Aus Liebe wollt ich alles wissen"
11. "Etwas zerstört"
12. "Woran hält sich die Liebe"

Bonus songs

13. "Das Glück liegt auf der Straße"
14. "Mein Sex"
15. "Kannst du mich hochziehn"
16. "Alles falsch gemacht"
17. "Wo bist du" (Barton, Hassbecker, Danz)
18. "Horizont" (Udo Lindenberg, Bea Reszat)
19. "Ich bin ich (Akustik Version)"

== Charts and certifications ==
=== Weekly charts ===
Chart (2006)	Peak position
Austrian Albums (Ö3 Austria)	1
German Albums (Offizielle Top 100)	1
Swiss Albums (Schweizer Hitparade)	10

=== Year-end charts ===
Chart (2006)	Position
Austrian Albums (Ö3 Austria)	14
German Albums (Offizielle Top 100)	1
Swiss Albums (Schweizer Hitparade)	47

Chart (2007)	Position
German Albums (Offizielle Top 100)	8

=== Certifications ===
Region	Certification	Certified units/sales
Austria (IFPI Austria)	Platinum	30,000^{*}
Germany (BVMI)	11× Gold	1,100,000^{^}
Switzerland (IFPI Switzerland)	Gold	15,000^{^}
^{*} Sales figures based on certification alone.^{^} Shipments figures based on certification alone.
