= 2raumwohnung =

German band

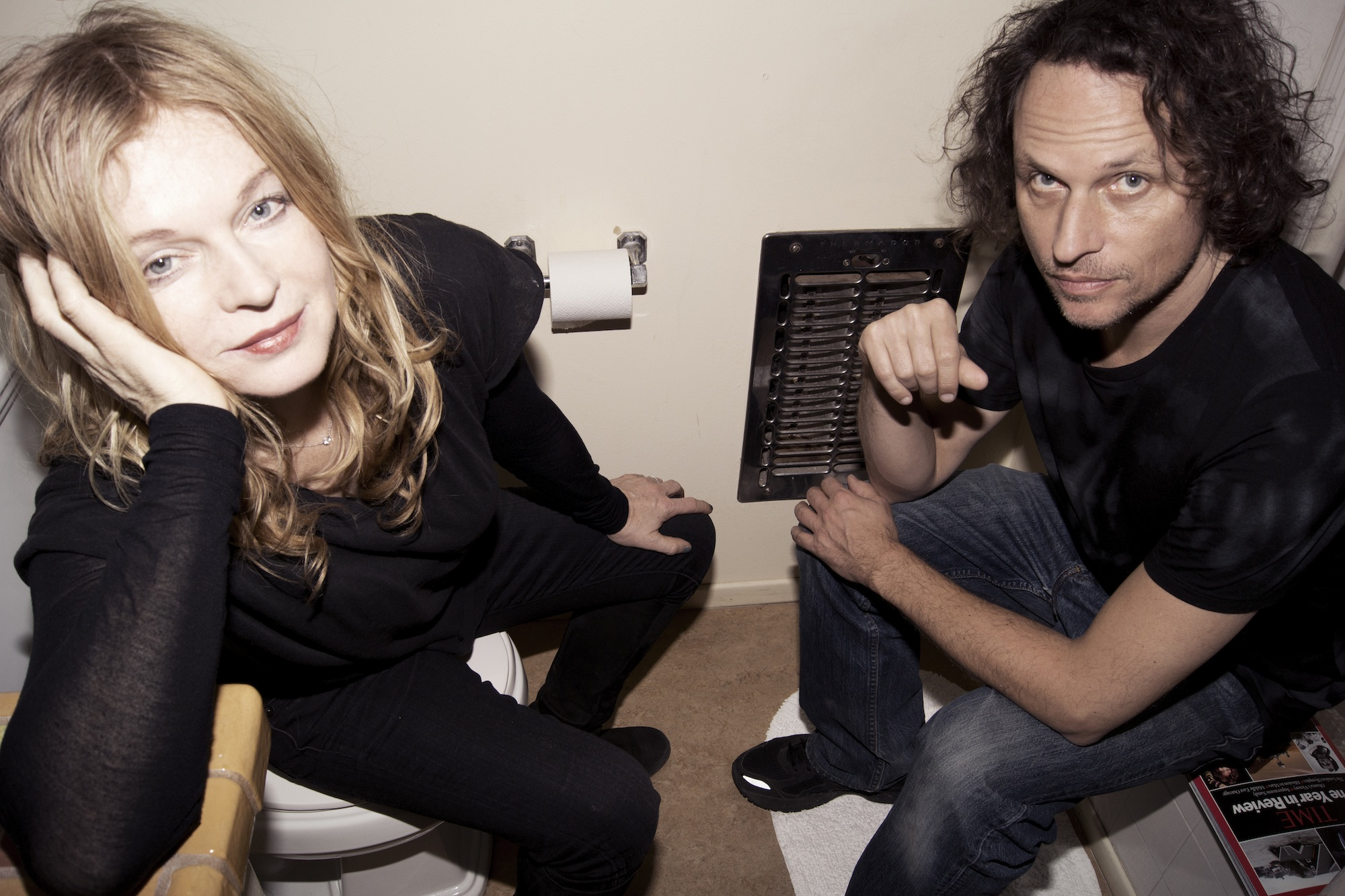
2raumwohnung (2012)

2raumwohnung (German: [ˈtsvaɪʁaʊmˌvoːnʊŋ]; meaning "2-Room Apartment") are a German electro-pop duo that was formed in 2000 in Berlin. Its two members are singer Inga Humpe and her life partner Tommi Eckart. They reached the high point of their career to date with the album "36 Grad" ("36 Degrees"), which remained in the German music charts for a total of 33 weeks. Their most successful single has been the album's eponymous title song. 2raumwohnung have also appeared internationally, e.g. at Expo 2010 and as a DJ team. The band releases its music on their own record label it-sounds.

== History ==
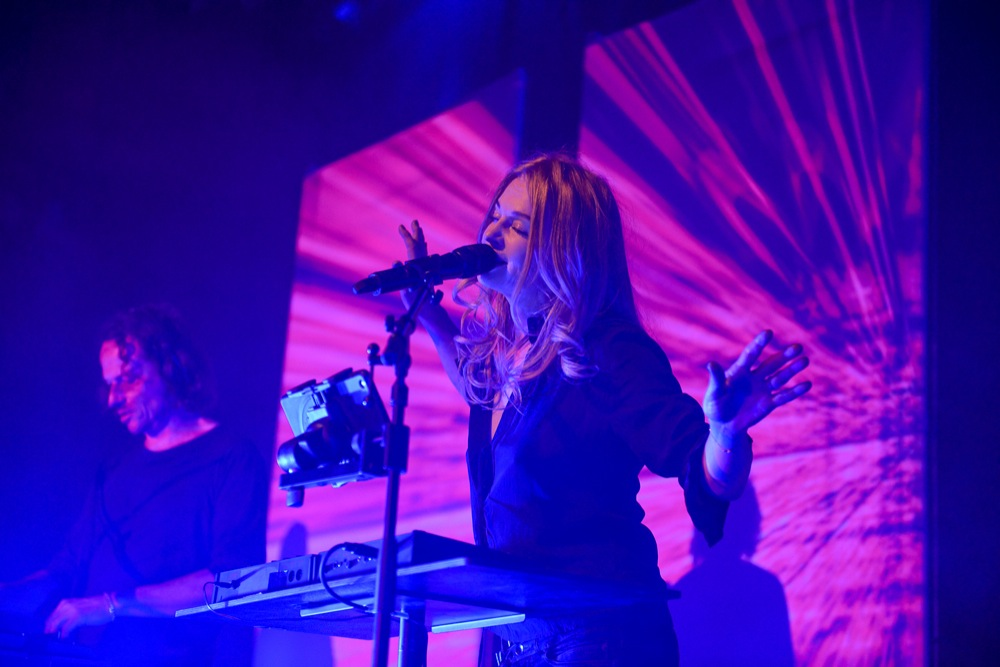
2raumwohnung in Darmstadt (2014)

2raumwohnung first met in East Berlin where they both settled shortly after German reunification in 1990. The band's first appearance was in Sternradio in 2001, a legendary club at Alexanderplatz. Before their formation as a band, the duo had been collaborating as a studio project, releasing their music under a pseudonym.

Recordings from that period were used in advertisements, such as for Imperial Tobacco's "Cabinet" brand ("Wir trafen uns in einem Garten" ("We Met in a Garden")) and for HypoVereinsbank. The latter used the song "2 von Millionen von Sternen" ("Two Out of Millions of Stars") as a jingle in a TV advertisement for the introduction of the Euro, although the wider public remained unaware of the song's performers at that point in time.

The group released its debut album under the title "Kommt zusammen" ("Come Together") on 2 July 2001. It included a total of 13 songs and was ultimately released by Goldrush on the record label BMG. The reviews were mostly positive and ranged from a "new feeling of lightness" to "esoteric children's disco". Due to successful sales, a remixed version of "Kommt zusammen", which combined house and electro elements, was also produced in January 2002. "In wirklich" ("In Real") appeared in September of the same year and furthered the band's success that had been established with the debut album. Although some critics felt it was lacking the characteristic charm of their previous album, it nevertheless quickly rose to #5 in the German charts. 2raumwohnung had the following to say during the release of "In wirklich":

We make music for people who reflect on life – those who are not so influenced by RTL television.

— Inga Humpe, KulturSpiegel 10/2002

"In wirklich" earned 2raumwohnung the German Dance Award for "Best Album". Their next album, "Es wird Morgen" ("It Will Be Tomorrow" / "It Will Be Morning"), soon followed in August 2004, contained twelve songs and was sold in three different CD editions. Reviewers felt the songs echoed the musical stylings of the '80s. Reviewers also felt that 2raumwohnung exhibited an impressive musical maturity, even though a certain lack of relevance was simultaneously mentioned. The record was performed live on tour throughout Germany and various neighboring European countries, with Jansen and Kowalski appearing as the opening act. The summer album, "Melancholisch schön" ("Melancholically Beautiful"), followed in 2005 and featured twelve of the band's most well-known songs, which were re-recorded and remixed in Bossa Nova style. The album included "Sexy Girl", a single that had been previously released on "Kommt zusammen", where it had become somewhat popular nationwide. In 2005, 2raumwohnung also received the Goldene Stimmgabel for "Best Duo".

In February 2007, following after a short break, 2raumwohnung composed two singles with Peter Plate from Rosenstolz and producer Ulf Leo Sommer for the album "36 Grad". With the first single, "Besser geht's nicht" ("It Can't Get Any Better Than This"), the duo made it into the top thirty of the German charts for the first time. The song was also featured in an AOK commercial. The second single, "36 Grad" ("36 Degrees"), was even more successful and placed directly in the top ten of the charts. It became a massive summer hit in 2007 and continues to be frequently played during the summer on national radio. Inga Humpe compared the song to George Michael's "Last Christmas", stating that it has maintained its summer popularity throughout the years, with ongoing possibilities of re-recordings and remixes. One such re-recording of "36 Grad" was produced in 2008 for the record Rhythms del Mundo, in which 2raumwohnung collaborated with Cuban musicians. Other German bands featured on this record included Rosenstolz, Culcha Candela, Ich + Ich and Jan Delay.

"36 Grad" has been 2raumwohnung's most commercially successful album to date, entering the charts on #7 and reaching #63 in the 2007 year end charts. Various remixes of the album's songs were produced with Paul van Dyk and Oliver Huntemann, among others. During the summer of 2007 and leading up to the tour for "36 Grad", it became known that Inga Humpe and Tommi Eckart were planning to live separately from each other. At that time, they were still living together in Berlin's Mitte district. Both artists spoke publicly about their age and the necessary distance without which their creativity was at risk. The tour covered a total of 17 cities, including Berlin, Cologne and Munich, as well as Vienna und Zürich. 2raumwohnung subsequently released a live "36 Grad" video DVD that included both the entire concert at Berlin's Columbia Hall as well as performances from 2003 to 2005.

Although a new record was not released in 2008, "Lasso" finally came out in August 2009. The name was chosen with reference to Orlando di Lasso. The album contained a total of 13 songs, including the singles "Wir werden sehen" ("We Will See") and "Rette mich später" ("Save Me Later"). Although Lasso could not quite match the success that "36 Grad" had acquired, reviewers saw the album as an expression of "Berliners' sense of and approach to life in understandable musical language". Inga Humpe admitted in an interview that the urban jungle has significantly influenced "Lasso". 2raumwohnung also went on tour with the album (Lasso Tour 2009), along with German-American-Persian musician Malakoff Kowalski. Furthermore, a remix album of Lasso appeared in 2010, in collaboration with Paul Kalkbrenner, Blake Baxter and Abe Duque, among others.

In 2010, 2raumwohnung had two guest appearances in the television soap opera GZSZ. The episodes were aired on February 12 and 15, with 2raumwohnung performing both "36 Grad" and "Rette mich später" in the so-called Mauerwerk. The appearance helped promote the new album and the following tour. In addition to television, 2raumwohnung have also found their way into contemporary German literature: specifically, in Oliver Bendel's "Nachrückende Generationen" ("Coming Generations"). In the novel, there is a scene of a boy dancing to the song "Wir sind die anderen" ("We Are The Others"). In addition, the band received the "Kulturpreis"-award (a cultural award) by Berliner Zeitung in January 2010. In 2011, 2raumwohnung played Gustav Mahler's 5th Symphony together with the Frankfurt Radio Symphony conducted by the composer Moritz Eggert. The purpose of this collaboration, called "Music Discovery Project", aimed to merge different musical worlds.

On 6 September 2013 the album "Achtung fertig" ("Ready Set") was released. It was produced in Los Angeles, among other places, and the first single "Bei dir bin ich schön" ("With You I'm Beautiful") was released in August of the same year. During the release of the album, the song "Ich mag's genau so" ("I Like It Just Like That") was provided as a free download. The videos for these two songs were shot by actor Henning Gronkowski. In October and November 2013 and in March 2014, 2raumwohnung went on tour with "Achtung fertig" throughout Germany, Austria, Luxembourg and Switzerland. The concerts received mixed reviews by critics.

=== Inga Humpe ===
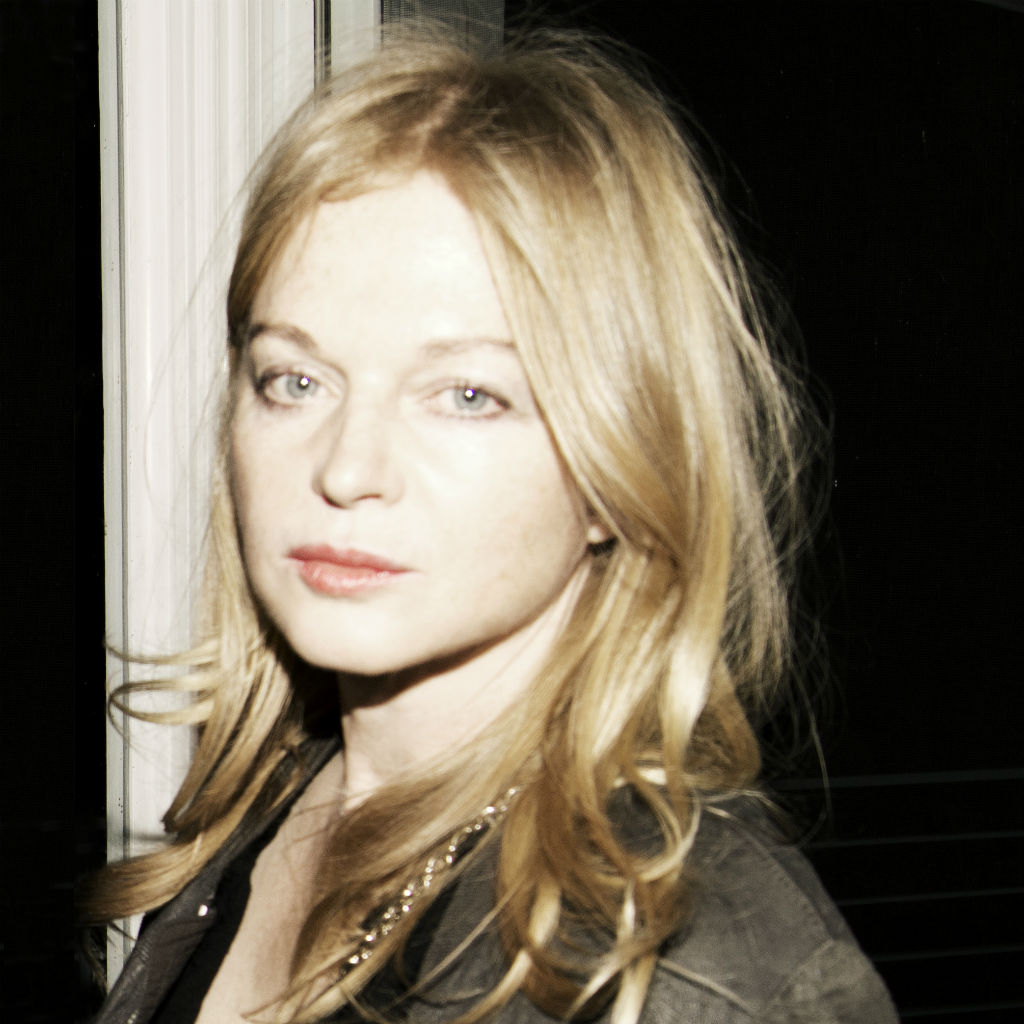
Inga Humpe (2013)

Humpe grew up in Herdecke on the Ruhr, where her parents owned a pastry shop. After graduating from high school, she began her studies in Art History and Comparative Literature at the RWTH Aachen in 1975. The following year, she switched to the Free University of Berlin. Occasionally she attended acting courses at the Max Reinhardt School. Following her first musical projects, she founded the punk band Neonbabies in the late 1970s, in which she was active as a singer until 1983. Humpe became known to a larger public as a member of the group DÖF with their hit "Codo". In the second half of the 1980s she recorded two albums in a duo with her sister Annette Humpe.

=== Tommi Eckart ===
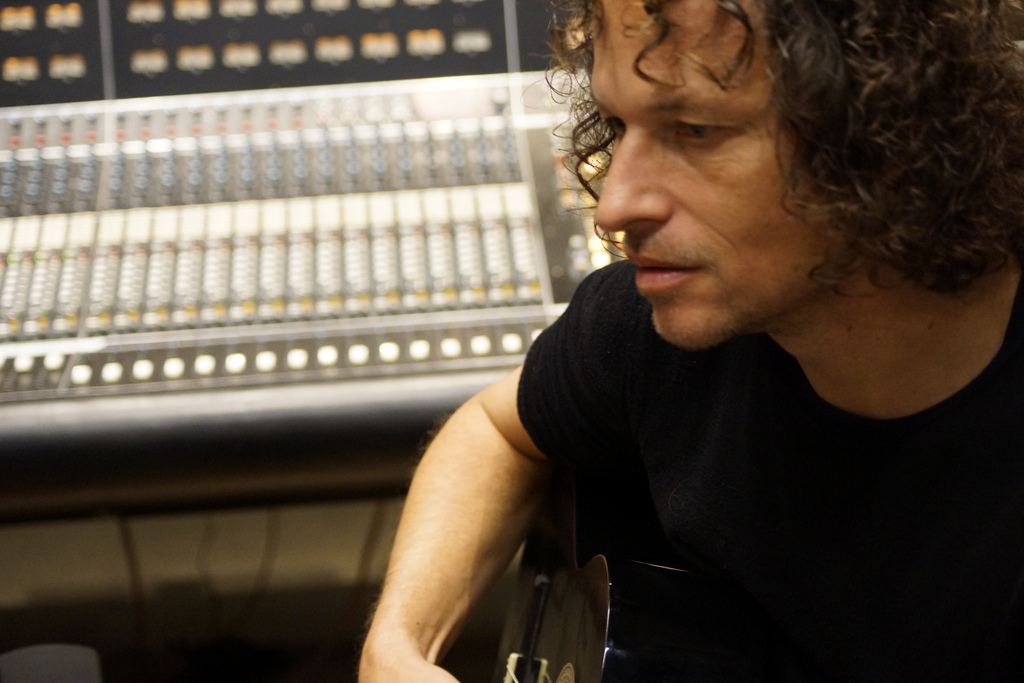
Tommi Eckart (2011)

Eckart was born in West Berlin and spent parts of his childhood in Munich. Together with colleagues, he founded the punk band Alternative Arschlöcher. His collaboration with Andreas Dorau began in the late 1980s and lasted into the 1990s. After the fall of the Berlin Wall, Eckart moved to East Berlin, where he lived in a former wiretapped apartment of the Ministry of State Security. In 1992, he and Ralf Hertwig from Palais Schaumburg founded the trance projects Transform and Perry & Rhodan, releasing the single "The Beat Just Goes Straight On & On" (Rising High Records) in 1993, among others. Eckart also worked with Klaus Löschner.

== Awards ==
- Dance Music Award 2003: Best Album for "In wirklich"
- Dance Music Award 2005: Best Album for "Es wird Morgen"
- Goldene Stimmgabel 2005: Best Duo
- Musikexpress Style-Award 2010: Best Performer Domestic
- B.Z. Kulturpreis 2010

== Discography ==
=== Albums ===
| Year | Album | Peak positions | | |
| Year | Album | GER | AUT | SWI |
|---|---|---|---|---|
| 2001 | Kommt zusammen | 30 | 18 | — |
| 2002 | In wirklich | 4 | 8 | 20 |
| 2004 | Es wird Morgen | 2 | 15 | 24 |
| 2005 | Melancholisch schön | 8 | 29 | 22 |
| 2007 | 36 Grad | 7 | 15 | 11 |
| 2009 | Lasso | 3 | 10 | 5 |
| 2013 | Achtung fertig | 4 | 16 | 3 |
| 2017 | Nacht und Tag | 23 | 33 | 36 |
| 2020 | 20Jahre 2raumwohnung | 30 | — | 69 |

=== Singles ===
| Year | Single | Peak positions | | |
| Year | Single | GER | AUT | SWI |
|---|---|---|---|---|
| 2000 | Wir trafen uns in einem Garten; Kommt zusammen | 90 | — | — |
| 2001 | Nimm mich mit – Das Abenteuer Liebe usw Kommt zusammen | 82 | 70 | — |
| 2001 | Sexy Girl; Kommt zusammen | — | — | — |
| 2001 | 2 von Millionen von Sternen; Kommt zusammen | 95 | — | — |
| 2002 | Ich und Elaine; In wirklich | 58 | — | — |
| 2002 | Ich weiss warum In wirklich | — | — | — |
| 2003 | Freie Liebe; In wirklich | 91 | — | — |
| 2004 | Spiel mit Es wird Morgen | 39 | — | — |
| 2004 | Wir sind die Anderen; Es wird Morgen | 72 | — | — |
| 2005 | Sasha (Sex Secret); Es wird Morgen | 96 | — | — |
| 2005 | Melancholisch schön Melancholisch schön | — | — | — |
| 2007 | Besser geht's nicht 36 Grad | 28 | 58 | 81 |
| 2007 | 36 Grad; 36 Grad | 22 | — | 17 |
| 2007 | Mir kann nichts passieren 36 Grad | — | — | — |
| 2008 | 36 Grad; Rhythms del Mundo – Cubano Alemán | 28 | 30 | — |
| 2009 | Wir werden sehen Lasso | 43 | — | 37 |
| 2009 | Body Is Boss; Lasso | 23 | — | 56 |
| 2010 | Rette mich später Lasso | — | — | — |
| 2010 | Der letzte Abend auf der Welt; Lasso | — | — | — |
| 2013 | Bei dir bin ich schön Achtung Fertig | 29 | — | 35 |
| 2014 | Bye Bye Bye | — | — | — |
| 2017 | Somebody Lonely and Me; Nacht und Tag | — | — | — |
| 2017 | Hotel Sunshine; Nacht und Tag | — | — | — |
| 2017 | Ich bin die Bass Drum; Nacht und Tag | — | — | — |
| 2017 | Ich hör Musik wenn ich dich seh Nacht und Tag | — | — | — |

== Miscellaneous ==
In April 2008, 2raumwohnung and about 200 other artists signed an open letter of the German Music Industry Association to chancellor Angela Merkel, which was published in the Süddeutsche Zeitung and Frankfurter Allgemeine Zeitung newspapers, among others. In the letter they argued in favor of increased protection of intellectual property, which was being prejudiced by file sharing in particular. In the wake of the Fukushima nuclear disaster, 2raumwohnung and other artists initiated another open letter and a held a vigil in front of the Federal Chancellery, with the aim of phasing-out nuclear power without delay.

2raumwohnung have repeatedly represented German music at major international events, such as a concert on the German National Day at Expo 2010 in Shanghai, along with other artists such as Nobelpenner and Konrad Chef. In June 2010, at the invitation of the Goethe Institute and the German Embassy in Pretoria, 2raumwohnung were guests at the FIFA World Cup 2010 in South Africa. They appeared together with Frank Dellé at the Soccer Meets Culture event.

The pseudonym 2raumwohnung was developed due to the fact that the two artists did not want to be associated with music for commercials. Working in this field was frowned upon in certain circles. The duo initially used the spelling "Zweiraumwohnung", but later changed this since the corresponding domain had already been registered.

2raumwohnung have been active throughout their career as a DJ team, appearing in New York City among other cities. In 2008, they played as part of Moguai & Friends at Weststadthalle in the city of Essen, and on Munich's Praterinsel during the Smirnoff Experience in 2003 (also with Moguai).
