= Zucker (Rosenstolz album) =

Studio album by Rosenstolz
- Released: 23 April 1999
- Studios: Hansa Ton Studios, Berlin, Germany
- Genres: Pop, chanson
- Length: 65:51
- Language: German
- Label: Polydor
- Producer: Peter Plate

Rosenstolz chronology
Alles Gute (1998)	Zucker (1999)	Zucker-schlampen:live (1999)

Singles from Zucker
- 1. "Perlentaucher" Released: 8 March 1999; 2. "Fütter deine Angst" / "Ja, ich will (Hochzeitssong)" Released: 26 April 1999; 3. "Ein anderes Gefühl von Schmerz (Promo CD)" Released: 1999; 4. "Zucker III (Promo CD)" Released: 1999

Zucker (Sugar) is the sixth studio album by German pop duo Rosenstolz. Released in 1999 by Polydor Records, it was the first Rosenstolz album to enter the top 10 of the German albums chart.

== Background ==
Following its release in April 1999, Zucker went straight to No. 2 in the German albums chart. In an interview, singer AnNa R. of Rosenstolz described the album as being more personal than earlier Rosenstolz albums. She further stated that the album was more mature in terms of the lyrics and the themes dealt with, attributing this to the fact that the band members were getting older.

"Perlentaucher" and "Fütter deine Angst", two songs from Zucker, reached No. 40 and No. 52, respectively, in the German singles chart. "Fütter deine Angst" was part of a double single with "Ja, ich will", and the latter together with "Zucker III" were included in a re-release of Zucker as bonus songs. "Ja, ich will" was a collaboration with German comedian Hella von Sinnen, calling for the introduction of same-sex marriage.

== Concert tour and live album ==
Songs from Zucker were introduced in the Rosenstolz concert tour which took place in Germany and Switzerland during May and June 1999. These songs included "Zucker II", "Ein anderes Gefühl von Schmerz", "Fütter deine Angst" and "Schieß mich jetzt ab". During the tour, Rosenstolz's first live album was recorded. Titled Zuckerschlampen:live, the album was released in September 1999 by Polydor Records and reached No. 5 in the German albums chart.

== Track listing ==
All songs were written by Peter Plate, AnNa R. and Ulf Leo Sommer, except "Heut' Nacht" (Manfred Praeker) and "Ja, ich will (Hochzeitssong)" (Plate, AnNa R. and Hella von Sinnen).

1. "ZuckerRoterMond" – 4:21
2. "Schieß mich jetzt ab" – 3:36
3. "Fütter deine Angst" – 4:00
4. "Perlentaucher" – 4:35
5. "Nackt (Juli)" – 4:40
6. "Schlange" – 4:04
7. "Nirwana" – 4:46
8. "Ein anderes Gefühl von Schmerz" – 4:47
9. "Heut' Nacht" – 4:13
10. "Das Ende meiner Karriere" – 4:09
11. "Cleopatra" – 3:26
12. "Vom Wesen der Liebe" – 4:39
13. "Ich und mein Prinz" – 3:42
14. "Mir muss es nicht gutgeh'n" – 4.33
15. "Nackt (Reprise)" – 1:29
16. "Zucker II" – 4:51

Bonus songs

17. "Ja, ich will (Hochzeitssong)" (with Hella von Sinnen) – 4:24
18. "Zucker III (Remix)" – 3:35
