= Die Suche geht weiter =

Studio album by Rosenstolz
- Released: 26 September 2008
- Recorded: November 2006 – June 2008
- Studio: Praxis (Berlin Germany); Bleibtreu Studio (Berlin, Germany); Gaga Studio (Hamburg, Germany)
- Genre: Pop
- Language: German
- Label: Island (Universal)
- Producer: Ulf Leo Sommer, Peter Plate, Daniel Faust

Rosenstolz chronology
Das große Leben live (2006)	Die Suche geht weiter (2008)	Die Suche geht weiter live (2009)

Singles from Die Suche geht weiter
- 1. "Gib mir Sonne" Released: 29 August 2008; 2. "Wie weit ist vorbei" Released: 5 December 2008; 3. "Blaue Flecken" Released: 2 April 2009; 4. "Ich bin mein Haus" Released: 11 September 2009

Die Suche geht weiter (The search goes on) is the eleventh studio album by German pop duo Rosenstolz. Released in 2008 by Island Records, the album reached No. 1 in the German and Austrian albums charts and No. 2 in the Swiss albums chart.

== Background ==
Die Suche geht weiter was produced following the unexpected death of the mother of Ulf Leo Sommer, co-writer and co-producer of Rosenstolz's songs and the then partner of musician Peter Plate of Rosenstolz. The first song written for the album, "An einem Morgen im April", concerns her death, and the sadness of the song determined the direction of the rest of the album.

In an interview before the album's release, Plate explained that the album deals with the issues of loss, death and grief and also with overcoming grief and embracing life. In another interview, singer AnNa R. of Rosenstolz stated: "Wir sagen mit diesen Liedern: Wenn du dir nicht selbst in den Arsch trittst, dann tut das kein anderer." ("What we're saying with these songs is: if you don't push yourself, then no one else is going to do it for you.") In addition, Plate compared the album's title Die Suche geht weiter (which means "The search goes on") to a personal life motto: "Es geht um Aufbruch und das permanente innere Unterwegs-Sein." ("It's about awakening and being on a continuous inner journey.")

== Release ==
Various editions of Die Suche geht weiter were released on 26 September 2008: one containing a CD with 12 songs, one containing the CD plus a bonus DVD, and one combining the CD with a T-shirt. Three further editions of Die Suche geht weiter were also later released, each containing a different set of bonus songs. The Tchibo exclusive edition (2008) contains 5 bonus songs sung in French. The edition released on 17 April 2009 contains 4 bonus songs, and the edition released on 18 September 2009 contains these 4 bonus songs plus 3 additional ones.

Die Suche geht weiter gave rise to four singles. The first was "Gib mir Sonne", which reached No. 1, No. 3 and No. 13 in the German, Austrian and Swiss singles charts, respectively. The other three singles – "Wie weit ist vorbei", "Blaue Flecken" and "Ich bin mein Haus" – were top 30 hits in Germany.

"Gib mir Sonne" was used as the title song for German telenovela Anna und die Liebe. Although originally invited to write a song specifically for the television show, Rosenstolz felt unable to do this and offered "Gib mir Sonne" instead, as the single was nearing completion. At the 2009 ECHO Awards, Rosenstolz won the award for best national video for "Gib mir Sonne". This was voted for by the German public via the websites of music television stations MTV and VIVA.

== Concert tour and live album ==
The concert tour associated with the release of Die Suche geht weiter started in the Columbiahalle (Columbia Hall) in Berlin on 7 November 2008 and was planned to take place over almost one year. However, the tour ended prematurely in January 2009 owing to Plate suffering from burnout. Despite the tour cancellation, a recording from the tour in the Münchner Olympiahalle (Munich Olympic Hall) was released as the live album Die Suche geht weiter live (2009), which was made available in CD and DVD formats. The live recording includes nine songs from Die Suche geht weiter: "Kein Lied von Liebe", "Ich bin mein Haus", "Irgendwo dazwischen", "Unerwartet (Ein Fenster zum Himmel)", "Wie weit ist vorbei", "An einem Morgen im April", "Gib mir Sonne", "Blaue Flecken" and "Bist du dabei".

== Track listing ==
All songs were written by Peter Plate, Ulf Leo Sommer and AnNa R.

1. "Ich bin mein Haus"
2. "Gib mir Sonne"
3. "Blaue Flecken"
4. "Irgendwo dazwischen"
5. "Kein Lied von Liebe"
6. "Wie weit ist vorbei"
7. "An einem Morgen im April"
8. "Unerwartet (Ein Fenster zum Himmel)"
9. "Bist du dabei"
10. "Herz schlägt auch im Eis"
11. "Wann kommst du (Autos fahr'n an mir vorbei)"
12. "Die Suche geht weiter"

Bonus songs (Tchibo exclusive edition)

13. "Tout déraille"
14. "À zéro"
15. "Mon fantôme"
16. "Mens moi"
17. "La descente"

Bonus songs (edition released on 17 April 2009)

13. "Mich hat die Liebe gekannt"
14. "Grüße an mein Leben"
15. "Schmetterlinge aus Eis"
16. "Fuego de vida (Gib mir Sonne)"

Bonus songs (edition released on 18 September 2009)

13. "Mich hat die Liebe gekannt"
14. "Schmetterlinge aus Eis"
15. "Alles ist erleuchtet"
16. "Grüße an mein Leben"
17. "Susi im roten Kleid"
18. "Ich bin mein Haus (Metro Radio Edit)"
19. "Fuego de vida (Gib mir Sonne)"

== Charts ==
=== Weekly charts ===
Chart (2008)	Peak position
Austrian Albums (Ö3 Austria)	1
German Albums (Offizielle Top 100)	1
Swiss Albums (Schweizer Hitparade)	2

=== Year-end charts ===
Chart (2008)	Position
Austrian Albums (Ö3 Austria)	32
German Albums (Offizielle Top 100)	15
Swiss Albums (Schweizer Hitparade)	54

Chart (2009)	Position
German Albums (Offizielle Top 100)	21

== Certifications ==
Region	Certification	Certified units/sales
Austria (IFPI Austria)	Gold	10,000^{*}
Germany (BVMI)	3× Platinum	600,000^{^}
Switzerland (IFPI Switzerland)	Gold	15,000^{^}
^{*} Sales figures based on certification alone.^{^} Shipments figures based on certification alone.
