= AnNa R. =

German singer (1969–2025)

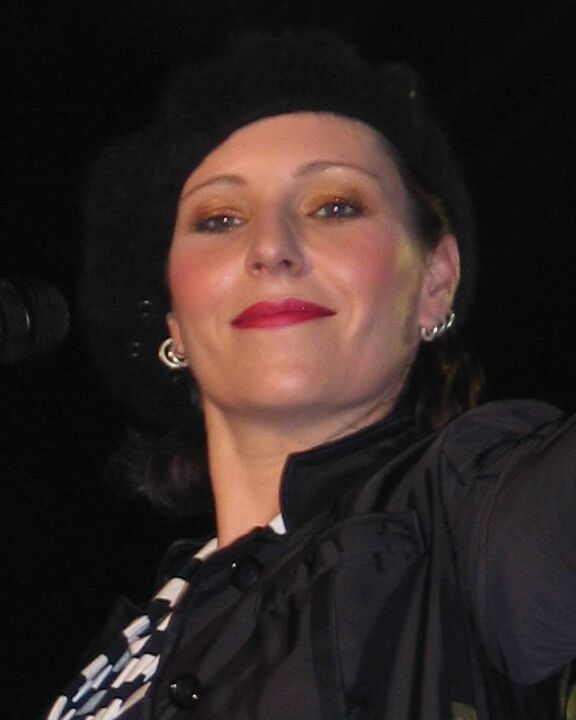
- AnNa R. in 2006

Background information
- Also known as: Andrea Neuenhofen
- Born: Andrea Rosenbaum; 25 December 1969; East Berlin, East Germany
- Died: 16 March 2025 (aged 55) Berlin, Germany
- Genre: Pop
- Occupations: Singer; songwriter
- Years active: 1991–2025
- Labels: Pool; Beaux (Traumton); Polydor; Island (Universal)
- Website: gleis8.net (in German)

Andrea Neuenhofen (née Rosenbaum; 25 December 1969 – 16 March 2025), better known by her stage name AnNa R., was a German singer and songwriter who provided the lead vocals for pop group Gleis 8. She was previously the main vocalist of Rosenstolz, a pop duo that was active between 1991 and 2012 and had chart hits in Germany, Austria and Switzerland.

== Early life ==
AnNa R. was born Andrea Rosenbaum on 25 December 1969 in Berlin-Friedrichshain and grew up in the former East Germany. She sang in a choir during her youth. After she had finished her secondary education, she auditioned for a place at Musikschule Friedrichshain (Friedrichshain music school), but was not accepted. Consequently, she took up private singing lessons. She also trained as a laboratory assistant after finishing her secondary education, but soon changed career to become a sheet music salesperson.

== Career ==
=== 1991–2012: Rosenstolz ===
Looking for a pianist to help her to realize her aim of becoming a bar singer, AnNa R. was introduced by a friend to Peter Plate, a keyboard player who had just moved to Berlin and needed a singer. Although they had different musical aspirations, with AnNa R. preferring to sing chanson and Plate wanting to make English-language pop music, the pair got together to write songs, performing them as pop duo Rosenstolz.

Although their early records were not commercially successful, AnNa R. and Plate achieved increasing success over Rosenstolz's two-decade history, eventually having charts hits not only in their native Germany but also in Austria and Switzerland. These included five No. 1 studio albums in Germany. During their Rosenstolz career, AnNa R. and Plate undertook various initiatives to raise money for AIDS charities, and both were awarded the Bundesverdienstkreuz (Order of Merit of the Federal Republic of Germany) in 2011 in recognition of their efforts. In 2012, the duo decided to split up. AnNa R. stated that both she and Plate wanted to take a break from each other and try something new.

AnNa R. was the main vocalist of Rosenstolz and also contributed to writing the lyrics of the band's songs with Plate and Ulf Leo Sommer. Towards the end of Rosenstolz, AnNa R. felt that she was not contributing as much to songwriting as she had done earlier in the band's history.

=== 2012–2025: Gleis 8 ===
In January 2012, AnNa R. started working with musicians Lorenz Allacher, Timo Dorsch and Manne Uhlig. The following year, they officially announced their formation as the band Gleis 8. Their debut album Bleibt das immer so, which was released in May 2013, reached No. 7 in the German albums chart. AnNa R. wrote the band's songs in cooperation with her band colleagues. She described the band as being democratic, with all the members being of equal standing.

A few weeks prior to her death, she took to Instagram to promote her "Courage to Love" tour, which was scheduled to start in October 2025.

== Personal life and death ==
AnNa R. married Nilo Neuenhofen in 2002. Her activities in her spare time included cooking and boxing.

On 17 March 2025, it was announced that AnNa R. had died of an undisclosed disease in Berlin, at the age of 55.

== Discography ==
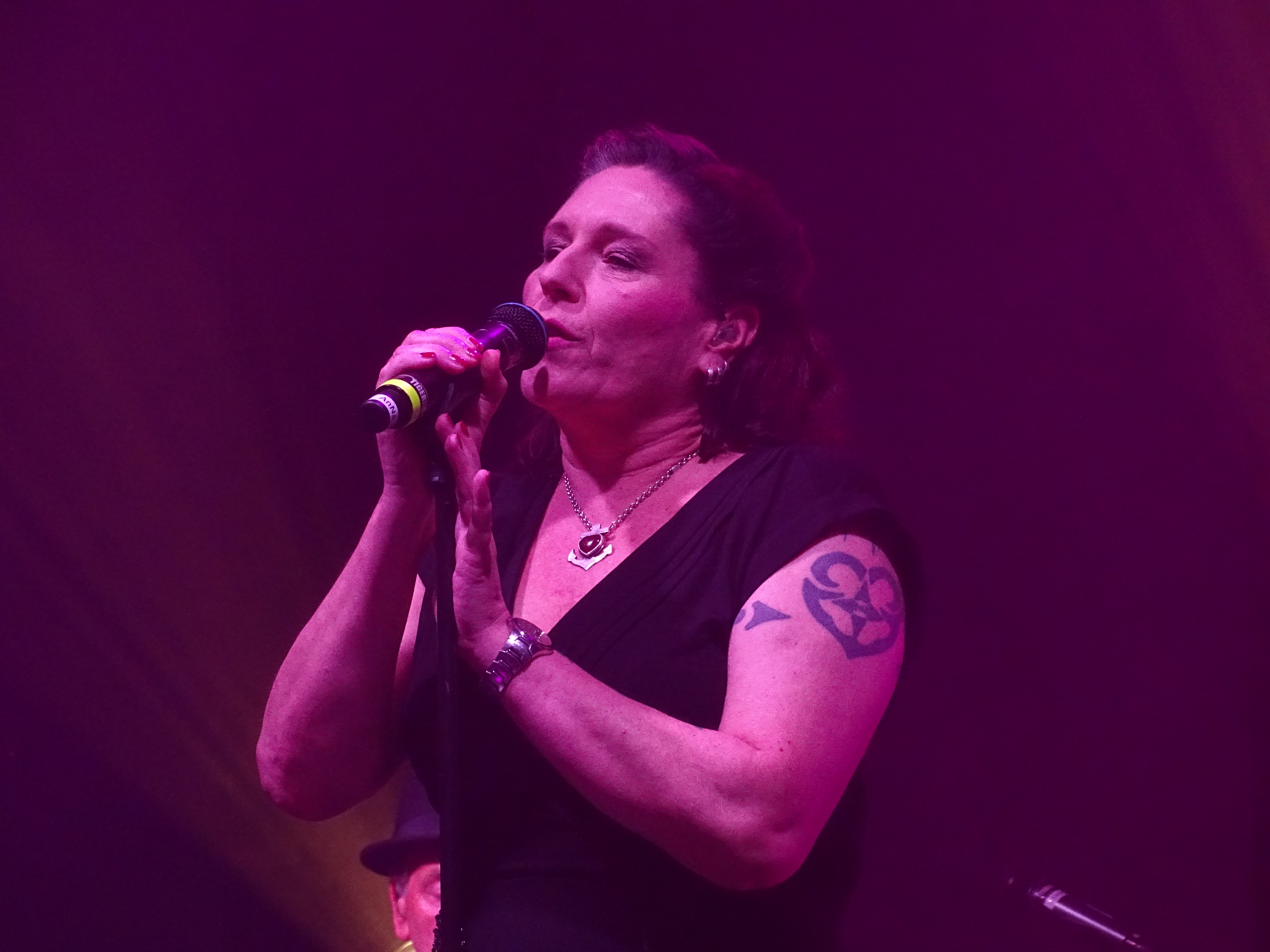
AnNa R. in 2022

Studio albums (Rosenstolz)

- Soubrette werd' ich nie (1992)
- Nur einmal noch (1994)
- Mittwoch is' er fällig (1995)
- Objekt der Begierde (1996)
- Die Schlampen sind müde (1997)
- Zucker (1999)
- Kassengift (2000)
- Macht Liebe (2002)
- Herz (2004)
- Das große Leben (2006)
- Die Suche geht weiter (2008)
- Wir sind am Leben (2011)

Studio albums (Gleis 8)

- Bleibt das immer so (2013)
- Endlich (2016)

Solo albums

- König:in (2023)
- Mut zur Liebe (2025)
