= Live aus Berlin (Rosenstolz album) =

Live album by Rosenstolz
- Released: 26 May 2003
- Recorded: 29 and 30 November 2002
- Venues: Columbiahalle (Berlin, Germany)
- Genres: Pop, rock, chanson
- Language: German
- Label: Island (Universal)
- Producers: Peter Plate, Ulf Leo Sommer

Rosenstolz chronology
Macht Liebe (2002)	Live aus Berlin (2003)	Herz (2004)

Live aus Berlin (Live from Berlin) is a live album by German pop duo Rosenstolz that was recorded in the Columbiahalle (Columbia Hall) in Berlin during the band's 2002 Macht Liebe tour. The album was released in 2003 by Island Records on single CD, double CD, and DVD.

== Critical reception ==
The double-CD edition of Live aus Berlin containing all 24 songs of the Columbiahalle concert was favourably reviewed by Linus Schwanke of German music magazine laut.de, who felt that the album faithfully captured the live performance. Felix Kosel of German music magazine bloom was also impressed with the double-CD album, commenting that it reflected the feelings and atmosphere in the Columbiahalle. However, he was less impressed with the video recording on the DVD album, criticizing the unsharp pictures, the editing and the cinematography. By contrast, the DVD album was seen in a positive light by Anja Kesting of German women's magazine AVIVA-Berlin, as it provided a glimpse behind the scenes.

== Track listing ==
=== Single-CD edition ===
1. "Intro: Macht Liebe / Fütter deine Angst" – 5:15
2. "Bastard" – 4:41
3. "Lass sie reden" – 3:43
4. "Sex im Hotel" – 4:11
5. "Laut" – 3:55
6. "Der Moment" – 4:50
7. "Komm doch mit" – 3:23
8. "Megapower (Schlampenfieber)" – 3:46
9. "Nur einmal noch" – 3:55
10. "Es tut immer noch weh" – 4:13
11. "Es könnt' ein Anfang sein" – 5:25
12. "Königin" – 4:29
13. "Sternraketen" – 5:08
14. "Die Schlampen sind müde" – 4:49
15. "Herzensschöner" – 4:22
16. "Tag in Berlin (November)" – 3:01
17. "Was kann ich für eure Welt" – 3:51

=== Double-CD edition ===
CD 1

1. "Intro: Macht Liebe / Fütter deine Angst" – 5:15
2. "Bastard" – 4:40
3. "Ich verbrauche mich" – 4:34
4. "Lass sie reden" – 3:43
5. "Sex im Hotel" – 4:12
6. "Heiss" – 3:36
7. "Ich geh auf Glas" – 3:14
8. "Laut" – 3:59
9. "Raubtier" – 5:01
10. "Lachen" – 6:23
11. "Wenn du jetzt aufgibst" – 4:12
12. "Der Moment" – 4:50

CD 2

13. "Komm doch mit" – 3:27
14. "Die Zigarette danach" – 3:16
15. "Megapower (Schlampenfieber)" – 3:46
16. "Nur einmal noch" – 3:55
17. "Es tut immer noch weh" – 4:12
18. "Es könnt' ein Anfang sein" – 5:25
19. "Königin" – 4:53
20. "Sternraketen" – 5:07
21. "Die Schlampen sind müde" – 4:56
22. "Tag in Berlin" – 3:02
23. "Das verkaufte Lachen" – 3:46
24. "Herzensschöner" – 4:33

=== DVD edition ===
The track listing for the DVD edition is identical to that for the double-CD edition.

== Charts ==
Chart (2003)	Peak position
German Albums (Offizielle Top 100)	11

== Certifications ==
Region	Certification	Certified units/sales
Germany (BVMI)	Gold	100,000^{‡}
Germany (BVMI) DVD	Platinum	50,000^{^}
^{^} Shipments figures based on certification alone.^{‡} Sales+streaming figures based on certification alone.
