= Die Schlampen sind müde =

Studio album by Rosenstolz
- Released: 29 September 1997
- Studio: Vielklang Studio; Hansa Tonstudio (Berlin, Germany)
- Genre: Pop, chanson
- Length: 61:14
- Language: German
- Label: Polydor
- Producer: Peter Plate, Tom Müller

Rosenstolz chronology
Objekt der Begierde (1996)	Die Schlampen sind müde (1997)	Raritäten (1997)

Singles from Die Schlampen sind müde
- 1. "Ich stell' mich an die nächste Wand (Monotonie)" / "Die Schlampen sind müde" Released: 11 August 1997

Die Schlampen sind müde (The tarts are tired) is the fifth studio album by German pop duo Rosenstolz. Released in 1997 by Polydor Records, it was the first Rosenstolz album to enter the German albums chart.

== Background ==
Die Schlampen sind müde was released on 29 September 1997 and re-released on 4 November 2002. The initial release reached No. 31 in the German albums chart despite lack of attention from radio stations and music television stations and was followed by a winter concert tour, where Rosenstolz introduced songs from the new album such as "Die öffentliche Frau".

== Track listing ==
All songs were written by Peter Plate and AnNa R., except where indicated.

1. "Die öffentliche Frau" – 4:16
2. "Die Schlampen sind müde" – 4:35
3. "Die Psychologin" – 3:35
4. "Königin" – 3:19
5. "Dunkle Wolken (Mai)" – 4:41
6. "Party mit mir selbst" – 3:29
7. "Lass mich dein Schlafzimmer sein" – 3:41
8. "Die Einsamkeit der Rosen" – 3:31
9. "Es lebe der König" – 5:02
10. "Vergoldet" – 3:32
11. "Ich stell' mich an die nächste Wand (Monotonie)" – 4:02
12. "Alles wird besser" – 5:12
13. "Wir tanzen Tango" (Wolfgang W. Wallroth, Werner Mangalin) – 3:23
14. "Duett" – 3.31
15. "Wenn du jetzt aufgibst" – 5:25

CD-ROM track

"Königin"
