= Rosenstolz =

German pop duo

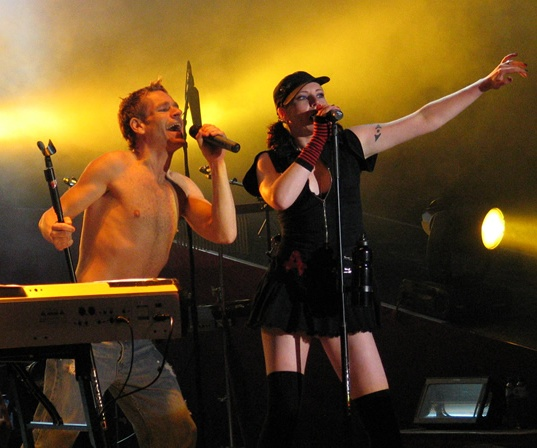
- Rosenstolz performing in 2004

Background information
- Origin: Berlin, Germany
- Genres: Pop; rock; chanson
- Years active: 1991–2012
- Labels: Pool, Beaux (Traumton), Polydor/Island (Universal)
- Past members: AnNa R.; Peter Plate
- Website: rosenstolz.de

Rosenstolz (German pronunciation: [ˈʁoːzənʃtɔlts]) was a German pop duo from Berlin that was active between 1991 and 2012 and had chart hits in Germany, Austria and Switzerland. The duo consisted of singer AnNa R. and musician Peter Plate, who occasionally provided vocals. Rosenstolz achieved major chart success after the nineties, with five studio albums going to No. 1 in the German albums chart. Although the duo split up to pursue separate music careers, they left open the possibility of a future reunion. AnNa R. died unexpectedly in March 2025, at the age of 55.

Rosenstolz's music was described by critics as containing elements of various genres, including pop and chanson. However, comparisons with Schlager were strongly disputed by the duo, who defined themselves simply as a pop group. Rosenstolz's repertoire included ballads and quirky pop songs, though later years saw the duo eschewing their quirky side. Common themes in the songs written by Rosenstolz were sex, love and emotions.

== History ==
=== 1991: Formation ===
Prior to the formation of Rosenstolz, native Berliner AnNa R. had ambitions of becoming a bar singer, whereas Plate was a member of a short-lived band while living in Braunschweig. The duo first met shortly after Plate had moved to Berlin in December 1990. They were put in contact with each other by the landlord of Plate's flat, who knew that singer AnNa R. was looking for a pianist and that keyboard player Plate needed a singer. The duo first met in AnNa R.'s flat and went on to Plate's flat the same evening, where they recorded a song together.

The duo began to meet regularly to work on new songs despite their different music tastes – AnNa R. had a preference for singing chanson, while Plate's interests lay in making English-language pop music. They initially attempted to work with English songs, but they were not satisfied with the results and consequently turned to German, their mother tongue. Within about four months, they had enough material to produce their first cassette and were eager to give their first concert. They considered various possibilities for the name of their band, one of the early favourites being A & P, but eventually settled on Rosenstolz, a made-up name which somehow occurred to them and which immediately appealed to them.

The first Rosenstolz concert took place on 4 October 1991 in Berlin at the Galerie Bellevue, where most of the people present were friends of the duo. The next concert at the SchwuZ gay club in Berlin on 7 December 1991 was in front of an audience of 400 people. However, the members of the audience, who were waiting for the main act, became restless after Rosenstolz had played a few songs and eventually shouted at the duo.

=== 1992–1995: Soubrette werd' ich nie, Nur einmal noch and Mittwoch is' er fällig ===
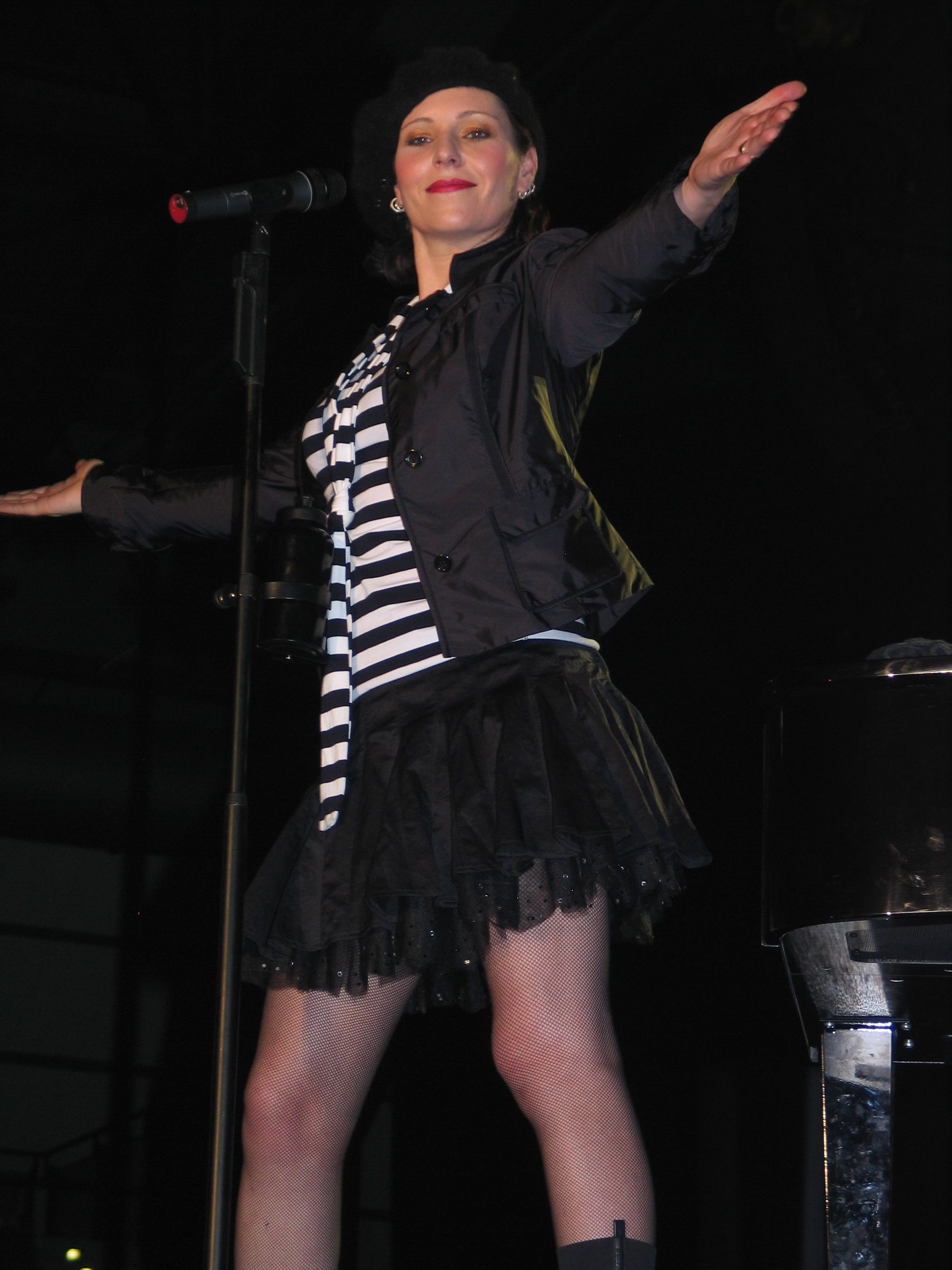
AnNa R. (2006)

Rosenstolz continued to perform live following the initial concerts and was soon discovered by record producer Tom Müller, who had previously worked with German singer Nina Hagen. Recording began on the band's debut album, Soubrette werd' ich nie, which was released towards the end of 1992 by indie label Pool. However, the album received little attention and was not a commercial success. Müller was not concerned whether the album would be a hit or not and provided AnNa R. and Plate with temporary financial support so that they could devote more time to writing new songs for the next Rosenstolz album and to performing live.

Eventually, Rosenstolz was giving around 10 concerts per month, mostly in the eastern states of Germany. By 1993, the band was able to hold – according to Plate – its first proper concert, which took place at the WABE culture centre in Berlin and had 600 fans attending. Two years later, the band's planned concert at the Metropol in Berlin quickly sold out, resulting in the band deciding to hold an additional concert at the same venue. The audience of 1500 people at the Metropol was the band's largest to date.

An article in Berlin newspaper Berliner Zeitung gave a preview of the Metropol concerts, one of the comments being: "Ihre Musik lebt von wohldosierten Stilbrüchen – von perlendem Sopran zu Synthesizerklängen, von Elektropopgedudel zu Texten von milder Melancholie und von AnNa R.s Rollenspielen zwischen göttlicher Garbo und Großstadtschlampe." ("Their music lives on well measured changes in style – from sparkling soprano to synthesizer sounds, from electropop racket to lyrics of mild melancholy, and on AnNa R.'s role plays from divine Garbo to big-city tart.")

Rosenstolz also recorded two further studio albums: Nur einmal noch (1994) and Mittwoch is' er fällig (1995). Both were released by Traumton Records, a small record label to which the band had moved following a disagreement with Pool. The first single from Nur einmal noch, also of the same name, received frequent airplay on local radio in Berlin, helping to give the band more exposure. At the same time, the discos in Berlin started to play Rosenstolz's music.

=== 1996–1999: Objekt der Begierde, Die Schlampen sind müde and Zucker ===
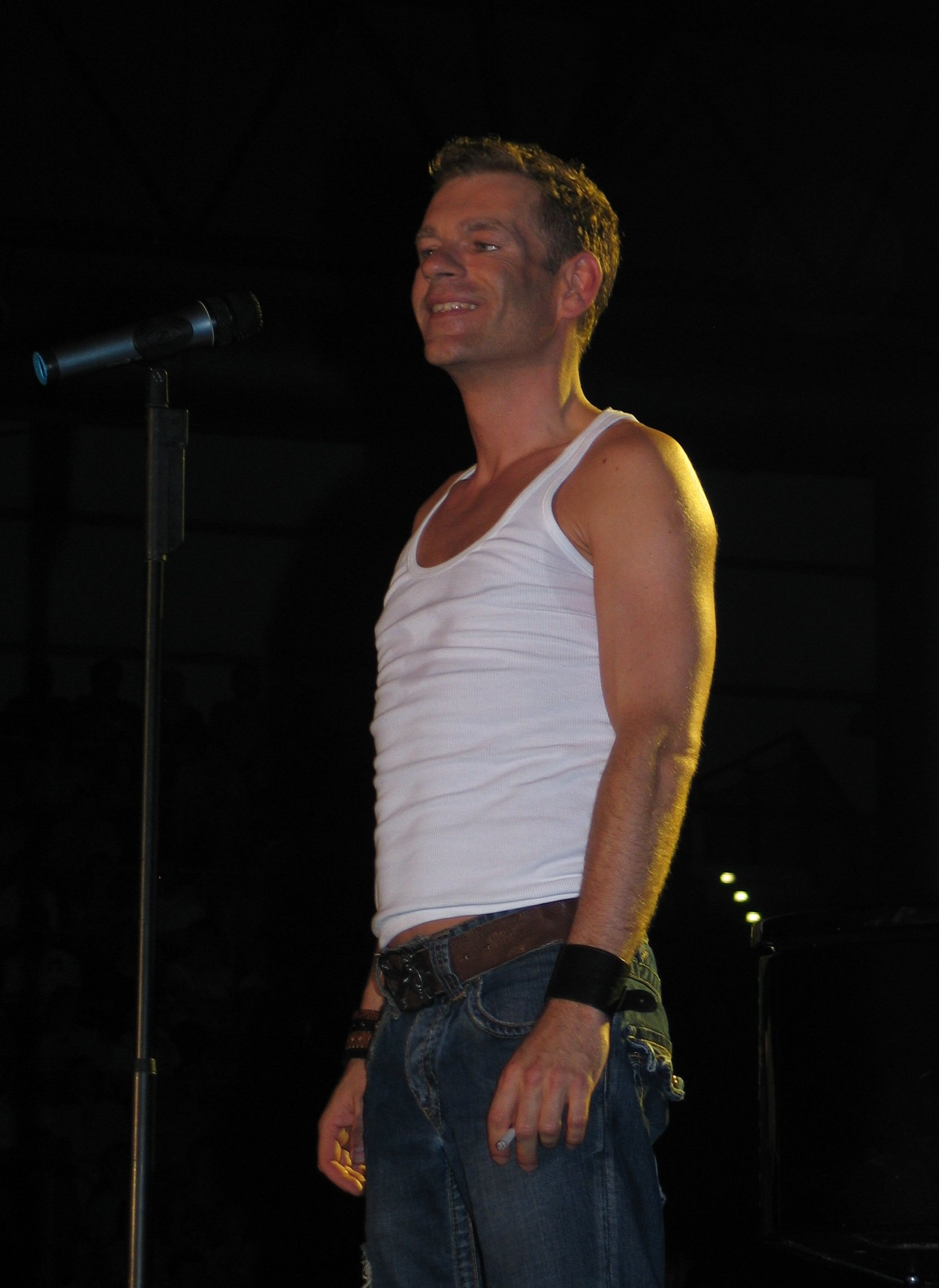
Peter Plate (2006)

By the mid-nineties, major record labels were starting to show an interest in Rosenstolz. After considering various offers, AnNa R. and Plate decided to switch to Polydor Records, where they were able to retain their artistic independence. The move to a major label meant that the costs of producing Rosenstolz's albums were no longer borne by Müller, but instead by the record label. In addition, more resources were now available to Rosenstolz, such as the use of a 20-piece string ensemble for the production of the song "Der Moment". The song was part of Rosenstolz's next studio album, Objekt der Begierde, which was released in 1996 and coincided with a tour that took place between May and December, with a break for the summer. During the tour, Rosenstolz saw increased audience numbers in the western states of Germany and performed in front of over 4000 people at the final concert in Berlin.

In 1997, Rosenstolz was invited by the Goethe-Institut to perform at a concert in Novosibirsk, Russia. The audience of about 10,000 people was the band's largest so far. Towards the end of the year, Rosenstolz went on a concert tour and entered the German charts for the first time with Die Schlampen sind müde, the band's fifth studio album. Despite the lack of airplay, the album remained in the charts for several weeks, peaking at No. 31.

Rosenstolz gained more exposure in 1998 by participating in the televised competition to find Germany's next representative for the Eurovision Song Contest. Although Rosenstolz did not win and came second, the song performed by the band, "Herzensschöner", was the first Rosenstolz song to enter the German singles chart, peaking at No. 34. "Herzensschöner" was included in the Rosenstolz compilation album Alles Gute, which was released in April 1998 and directly followed by a concert tour. The album itself reached No. 10 in the German albums chart.

Also in 1998, Rosenstolz parted ways with Müller. Rosenstolz's next studio album, Zucker, was produced by Plate and released in 1999. It charted more highly than the band's previous album, entering the charts at No. 2. Rosenstolz toured the same year and released the band's first live album, Zuckerschlampen:live, which also charted highly, entering the charts at No. 5.

Rosenstolz additionally released the song "Ja, ich will" in 1999, which was in support of the introduction of same-sex marriage. At the time, Germany had not yet legalized registered partnerships for same-sex couples. The song was a collaboration with German comedian Hella von Sinnen, who sang a duet with Plate in the song.

=== 2000–2004: Kassengift, Macht Liebe and Herz ===
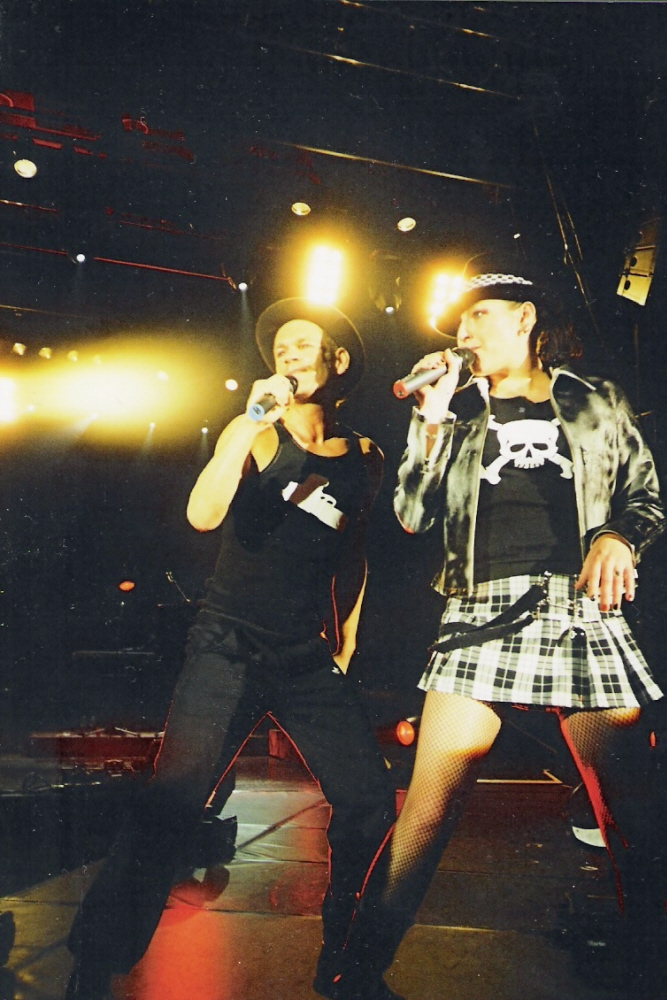
Peter Plate and AnNa R. during Rosenstolz's 2004 Herz tour

The start of the new millennium saw Rosenstolz topping the German albums chart for the first time with Kassengift, the band's seventh studio album. Released in September 2000, Kassengift was the first Rosenstolz album to credit Ulf Leo Sommer, Plate's partner since 1990, as both co-songwriter and co-producer. The release of the album coincided with Rosenstolz starting to receive airplay on music television stations through the music video for "Amo Vitam", a song from the album sung entirely in Latin. Immediately following the release of Kassengift, Rosenstolz went on a concert tour which included four concerts in the Columbiahalle in Berlin.

Two songs from Kassengift – "Total Eclipse" and "Die schwarze Witwe" – were re-recorded with guest singers Marc Almond and Nina Hagen, respectively, and released as a double single in March 2001. Later that year, Rosenstolz went on another concert tour and released the single "Es könnt' ein Anfang sein", which became the band's first top 10 hit in the German singles chart.

Rosenstolz's next studio album, Macht Liebe, came out in September 2002 and differed from earlier albums by featuring songs with electronic sounds reminiscent of the Neue Deutsche Welle. Macht Liebe reached No. 3 in the German albums chart, and the accompanying concert tour was a sell-out, including seven sold-out concerts in the Columbiahalle in Berlin. At the concerts, Rosenstolz performed "Laut", an anti-war protest song which preceded the 2003 invasion of Iraq.

The summer of 2003 saw the release of Rosenstolz's second live album and first live DVD album. Both were titled Live aus Berlin and recorded during the Macht Liebe tour. Rosenstolz's first open-air concert tour also took place that summer, ending in Berlin in front of an audience of 17,000 people at the Kindl-Bühne Wuhlheide.

In March 2004, Rosenstolz's ninth studio album, Herz, was released, featuring a mix of ballads and pop and rock songs. Herz reached Gold status after one week and then Platinum status shortly afterwards. It also went to No. 1 in the German albums chart. The singles "Liebe ist alles", "Ich will mich verlieben", and "Willkommen" from the album were top 10 hits in the German singles chart, and over 150,000 fans attended the concert tour following the album's release. The last concert of the tour, which took place outdoors at the Kindl-Bühne Wuhlheide in Berlin, was recorded and released as the live DVD album Willkommen in unserer Welt (2004). The song "Liebe ist alles" was later covered by singers Melanie C and Grégory Lemarchal: their versions of the song are titled "Let There Be Love" (2011) and "Je Deviens Moi" (2005), respectively.

=== 2005–2011: Das große Leben, Die Suche geht weiter and Wir sind am Leben ===
During the whole of 2005, Rosenstolz took a break from public appearances and worked on Das große Leben, the band's tenth studio album, which was released in March 2006. Consisting mostly of ballads, the album was the most successful in the band's history, staying at No. 1 in the German albums chart for four consecutive weeks and selling over one million copies. It was also the band's first album to top the Austrian albums chart and to enter the top 10 of the Swiss albums chart. All the singles from the album entered the German top 20: "Ich bin ich (Wir sind wir)", "Nichts von alledem (tut mir leid)", "Ich geh in Flammen auf", "Auch im Regen", and "Aus Liebe wollt ich alles wissen". The accompanying concert tour encompassed 36 concerts and concluded in Berlin with three sold-out open-air concerts at the Kindl-Bühne Wuhlheide in Berlin. One of the concerts from the tour was recorded and released as Das große Leben live (2006), a live album made available in both CD and DVD format.

In August 2008, Rosenstolz topped the German singles chart for the first time with "Gib mir Sonne". The song was from the band's eleventh studio album, Die Suche geht weiter, which was more reflective than earlier albums and written following the death of Sommer's mother. The album itself went to No. 1 in Germany and Austria and No. 2 in Switzerland. Two further singles from the album, "Wie weit ist vorbei" and "Blaue Flecken", reached the top 10 of the German singles chart. In November 2008, Rosenstolz began its 2008/2009 Bist du dabei tour, which ended prematurely in Hamburg in January 2009. It was later announced that Plate was suffering from burnout and that all future tour dates were cancelled. During the band's forced break, Rosenstolz released another live CD/DVD album, Die Suche geht weiter live (2009), which was recorded during the tour in Munich.

After a break of nearly three years, Rosenstolz returned to public attention in September 2011 with the release of the single "Wir sind am Leben" and a new studio album of the same name. Wir sind am Leben was well received by fans, reaching No. 1 in the German and Austrian albums charts and No. 3 in the Swiss albums chart. 2011 was also Rosenstolz's 20th anniversary. To mark this occasion, German broadcaster ARD broadcast the one-hour documentary Rosenstolz – Wir sind Wir! – Die Erfolgsgeschichte eines Popduos by Marc Boettcher.

=== 2012: Indefinite break & AnNa R. death ===
In February 2012, there were rumours in the media of Rosenstolz splitting up. These rumours were fuelled by cancellations of appearances on a television show and at the 2012 ECHO awards. However, the band's record label said the cancellations were due to illness.

At the end of 2012, AnNa R. and Plate posted a message on the official Rosenstolz website and on Facebook and Twitter to announce that they would be taking a break from Rosenstolz for an indefinite period of time. After many years together, the duo felt now was the best time to give each other some space and to go their separate ways. In 2013, the duo announced their new music projects, with Plate releasing a solo album and AnNa R. becoming a member of Gleis 8, a newly formed four-piece band. On March 17, 2025, AnNa R. died at the age of 55.

== Musical style ==
In terms of music genres, Rosenstolz's music fluctuated stylistically between pop, chanson and rock according to the press release for the 2011 biographical documentary Rosenstolz – Wir sind Wir! – Die Erfolgsgeschichte eines Popduos. Ernst Hofacker, editor of German music magazine Musikexpress, commented in 2002 that Rosenstolz's music flowed between chanson, German songs from the twenties, schlager and modern pop music. Other journalists also saw elements of pop, chanson and schlager in Rosenstolz's music. However, comparisons with schlager were strongly disputed by Rosenstolz, who expressed a dislike of that particular genre of music. In a 2008 interview, Plate refused to pigeonhole Rosenstolz's music and AnNa R. defined Rosenstolz simply as a pop group because of the broad definition of pop.

The early years of Rosenstolz saw the German media create the term Mondänpop to refer to the band's music because it was unlike other music. The term was invented by a journalist who remarked that AnNa R. looked mondän (chic) in a photo of her wearing a hat. Writing in 1995, Regina Kerner of Berliner Zeitung described Mondänpop as "freche Texte über Erotik und Musik ohne Angst vor Kitsch mit Schlagerelementen" ("impudent lyrics dealing with eroticism and music which does shy away from kitsch and features elements of schlager"). A further explanation was given by Tanja Stidinger, also of Berliner Zeitung, in 1996: "Beherzt klauen die beiden das Beste aus Schlager, Chanson und Neuer Deutsche Welle, rühren kräftig um, würzen das Ganze ab mit Diva-Allüren und Synthesizerklängen." ("The duo courageously lift the best bits from schlager, chanson and Neue Deutsche Welle, stir thoroughly, and season the whole thing with diva affectations and synthesizer sounds.")

Rosenstolz's range of song styles was summarized by Björn Döring in his review of the band's sixth studio album, Zucker (1999), in Berliner Zeitung:

Rosenstolz bedienen sich der Songmodelle, die sie auf ihren vorhergehenden Platten erfolgreich formuliert haben. Da gibt es den exaltierten, jauchzenden Popsong und die streichergeschwängerten Balladen. Da trällert Anna R. manchmal grandios im Belcanto herum oder begibt sich in die Tiefen ihrer Trauer. Die Keyboards geben den Ton an, auf Strophe folgt Refrain, auf angedeutete Experimente folgt eine Ballade in alter Form.

(Rosenstolz make use of the song styles that they have successfully shaped on their previous albums. There is the quirky, exulting pop song and the string-laden ballads. AnNa R. warbles grandiosely in bel canto at times or plunges into the depths of her sorrow. The keyboards set the sound, verse is followed by chorus, intimated experimental songs are followed by a traditional ballad.)

Rosenstolz changed musically over the years: in its biography of the band, German music magazine laut.de indicated that the term Mondänpop did not apply to the later years, as the band had become part of the mainstream. Critics contrasted Rosenstolz's later albums with earlier recordings by the band. In his review of Das große Leben (2006) in German newspaper Die Welt, Harald Peters found that Rosenstolz had dispensed with the (in his opinion) disagreeable musical and vocal elements from earlier years, focusing instead on mid-tempo piano-saturated guitar pop. While writing about Die Suche geht weiter (2008), Stefan Rother of German newspaper Badische Zeitung commented that the over-the-top vocals of AnNa R. were no longer to be heard and that Rosenstolz now dealt with more serious issues. In an interview in 2008, Plate stated that there were two phases of Rosenstolz, the first one ending with Macht Liebe (2002) and the second one starting with Herz (2004).

In a 1999 interview, AnNa R. explained that the Rosenstolz songwriting process usually involved the music first being composed by Plate, followed by the lyrics being co-written by the duo. She further stated that "Die Ideen kommen immer aus dem Leben, aus dem, was man sieht, was man fühlt oder träumt" ("The ideas always come from life experiences, from what one sees, what one feels or dreams"). Common themes in Rosenstolz songs were sex, love and emotions.

== Charity work ==
Rosenstolz was active in raising money for AIDS charities. At the band's concerts, donations were collected for Deutsche AIDS-Hilfe (German AIDS aid) and the issue of AIDS was highlighted.

In 1993, Rosenstolz released the limited edition CD Sanfte Verführer and donated the proceeds to Deutsche AIDS-Hilfe. In 1997, Rosenstolz raised money for Berliner AIDS-Hilfe (Berliner AIDS aid) by releasing the charity CD Rot ist die Liebe in collaboration with other artists and then holding a benefit concert in the Theater des Westens (Theatre of the west) in Berlin.

In March 2007, Rosenstolz released the charity single "Aus Liebe wollt ich alles wissen", with all proceeds going to the Deutsche AIDS-Stiftung (German AIDS foundation). Rosenstolz then held a benefit concert on 18 June 2007 in the Columbiahalle in Berlin, where the duo presented a cheque for 100,000 euros to the Governing Mayor of Berlin, Klaus Wowereit, who accepted it on behalf of the Deutsche AIDS-Stiftung.

Rosenstolz received two official awards in recognition of the band's efforts in the fight against AIDS. The first was the Sächsische Ehrenmedaille »Für herausragende Leistungen im Kampf gegen HIV und Aids" (Saxon medal of honour "for outstanding achievements in the fight against HIV and AIDS"), which was awarded on World AIDS Day 2009. The second was the Bundesverdienstkreuz (Order of Merit of the Federal Republic of Germany), which was awarded on 31 August 2011.

== Music awards ==
Various German music awards were awarded to Rosenstolz during the band's career. These included a Goldene Stimmgabel (six times), an ECHO award (five times) and a Comet award (two times). Multiple awards were won in 2003 and 2007.

In 2003, the band won three awards. These were an ECHO award for best website by an artist, a Comet award for best national music video ("Es tut immer noch weh"), and a Goldene Stimmgabel for best German pop duo.

A few years later in 2007, Rosenstolz received six awards. The band won a Goldene Kamera for best national pop act, an ECHO award for best national rock/pop group, and two DIVA awards, one for best artist and the other for best album. In addition, the band was awarded the Fred-Jay-Preis for song writing and Plate received the Paul-Lincke-Ring in recognition of his contribution to music.

== Film, television and other media ==
- Scenes from one of Rosenstolz's first concerts can be seen in the 14th episode of German gay television series Licht und Schatten by Andreas Weiß.
- The song "Willkommen" from the album Herz (2004) forms part of the soundtrack for Sommersturm (2004), a German film about a teenage boy coming out, and is played during the closing credits. Scenes from the film can be seen in the music video for "Willkommen".
- Another song by Rosenstolz, "Gib mir Sonne" from the album Die Suche geht weiter (2008), was used as the title song for Anna und die Liebe, a German telenovela starring Jeanette Biedermann.
- Rosenstolz wrote and sang the title song for Tiger Taps, a series of German audio dramas for children about the adventures of a tiger and his jungle friends. The title of the song is "Weil wir Freunde sind (Der Tiger Taps Song)" (2011).

== Band members ==
- AnNa R. – vocals, lyrics (deceased)
- Peter Plate – keyboards, occasional vocals, composition, lyrics, production

== Discography ==
Studio albums

- Soubrette werd' ich nie (1992)
- Nur einmal noch (1994)
- Mittwoch is' er fällig (1995)
- Objekt der Begierde (1996)
- Die Schlampen sind müde (1997)
- Zucker (1999)
- Kassengift (2000)
- Macht Liebe (2002)
- Herz (2004)
- Das große Leben (2006)
- Die Suche geht weiter (2008)
- Wir sind am Leben (2011)
