= Peter Plate =

German musician and record producer (born 1967)

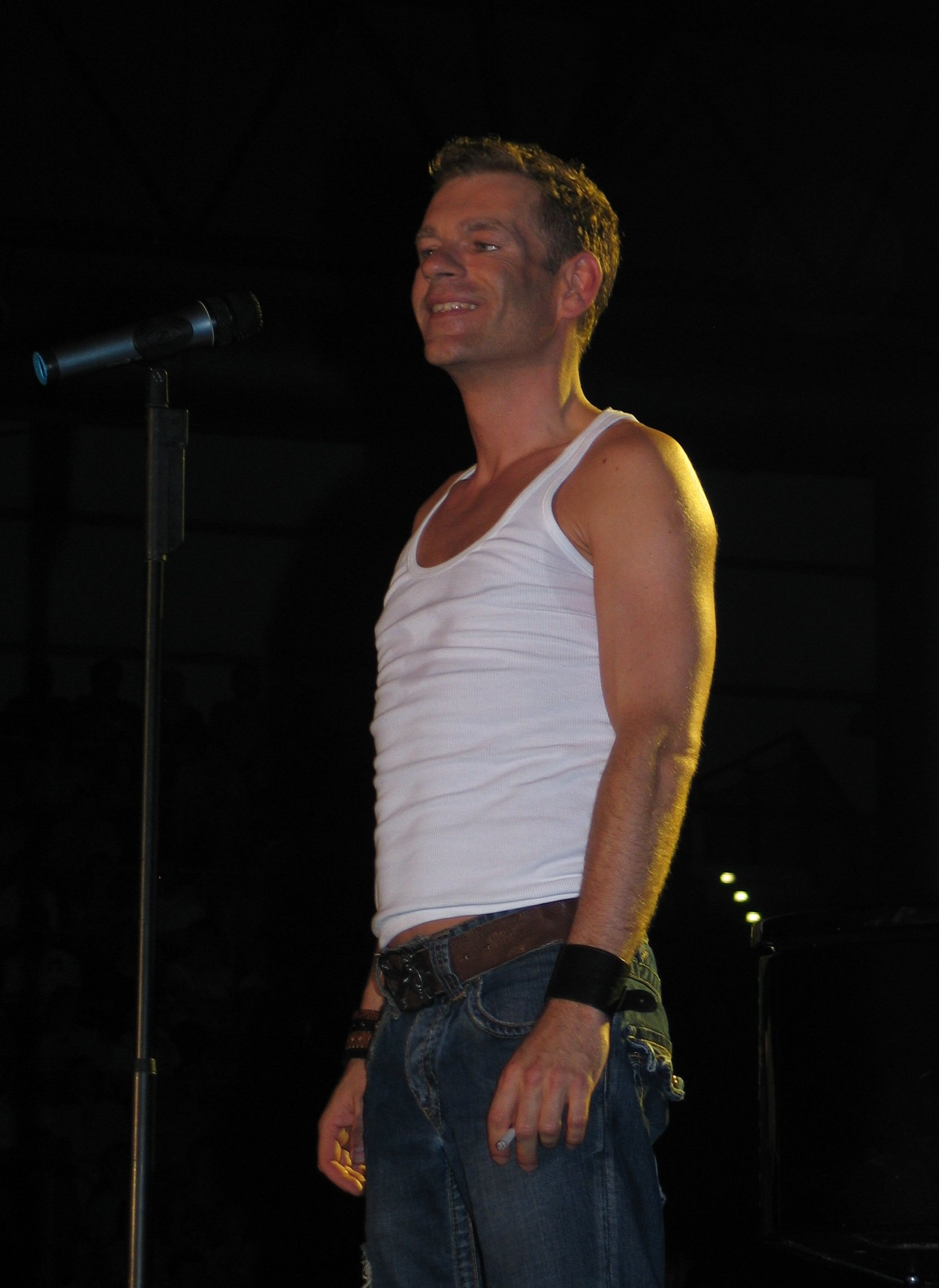
- Plate in 2006

Background information
- Born: 1 July 1967 (age 59); New Delhi, India
- Origin: Berlin, Germany
- Genre: Pop
- Occupations: Musician, singer, songwriter, record producer
- Instrument: Keyboards
- Years active: 1991–present
- Labels: Pool, Beaux (Traumton), Polydor/Island (Universal)
- Formerly of: Rosenstolz
- Website: www.peter-plate.de (in German)

Peter Plate (born 1 July 1967) is a German musician, singer, songwriter and record producer. Between 1991 and 2012, he was the keyboardist and occasional vocalist of Rosenstolz, a German pop duo that had chart hits in Germany, Austria and Switzerland.

== Early life ==
Peter Plate was born on 1 July 1967 in New Delhi, where his grandfather was a diplomat, and came to Germany at the age of three, spending his childhood first in Hamburg and then in Goslar. He learnt to play the electronic organ during his youth and wrote a musical with friends at the age of 17. As a young adult, he moved to Braunschweig, where he did his civilian service in a retirement home. While living in Braunschweig, he became a student of social pedagogy, but did not complete his studies, and was also a member of a short-lived band. In December 1990, he moved with his partner Ulf Leo Sommer to Berlin, where he found a job in a hair salon.

== Music career ==
=== 1991–2012: Rosenstolz ===
Plate met singer AnNa R. shortly after moving to Berlin. They got together to write songs, performing them at local venues as pop duo Rosenstolz. The duo were soon discovered by record producer Tom Müller, after which they were able to work on studio albums and develop their fanbase. Over Rosenstolz's two-decade history, the duo released 12 studio albums, 4 live albums and over 40 singles and achieved chart success in Germany, Austria and Switzerland. Five of Rosenstolz's studio albums went to No. 1 in the German albums chart. The duo split up at the end of 2012, but left open the possibility of a future reunion.

As the musician in Rosenstolz, Plate composed the music of the band's songs and co-wrote the songs' lyrics with colleague AnNa R. In later Rosenstolz albums, he also co-wrote the songs with his partner Sommer. Plate was also involved in producing Rosenstolz's studio albums, Objekt der Begierde (1996) being the first album which he co-produced.

=== 2012–present: Solo career ===
In April 2013, Plate released his debut solo album Schüchtern ist mein Glück. Most of the songs of the album were co-written by Plate with Sommer and/or with Daniel Faust, a producer and musician who was previously involved in recording Rosenstolz's albums. The album reached No. 29 in the German albums chart.

The team of Plate, Sommer and Faust was also involved in other projects. They composed the songs and film music for Bibi & Tina (2014), a German children's film directed by Detlev Buck. In addition, they composed the songs for Romeo & Julia (2014), a German musical based on a retranslation of William Shakespeare's Romeo and Juliet by intendant Daniel Karasek and dramaturge Kerstin Daiber.

=== Collaborations ===
Plate has collaborated with various musical artists. They include French singer Patricia Kaas, for whom he was involved in writing and producing the song "Herz eines Kämpfers" (2005). Plate has also collaborated with German pop duo 2raumwohnung. Together with Sommer, he worked with the duo to write their singles "Besser geht's nicht" and "36 Grad" (both 2007) and "Rette mich später" (2009). A further collaboration was with English singer Melanie C, who came to Berlin to record "Let There Be Love" (2011), a cover version of the Rosenstolz hit "Liebe ist alles" (2004).

== Activism ==
During their years with Rosenstolz, Plate and AnNa R. undertook various activities to raise money for AIDS charities. For their efforts in the fight against HIV and AIDS, they were awarded the Bundesverdienstkreuz (Order of Merit of the Federal Republic of Germany) in 2011.

At Rosenstolz concerts, Plate regularly spoke out against the views of the Pope on homosexuality. In 1999, Rosenstolz released the single "Ja, ich will" in support of the introduction of same-sex marriage. A few years later, the duo wrote "Laut", an anti-war protest song.

In December 2013, Plate, together with Carolina Bigge, initiated a campaign to highlight the situation of homosexuals in Russia following the passing of laws banning "homosexual propaganda". They released the charity single "Zehn (Für Natascha und Olga)", with proceeds going to support groups in Russia, and also headed a demonstration outside the Russian embassy in Berlin.

== Personal life ==
Plate first met Sommer in 1990, and they entered into a registered partnership in 2002. The couple later separated around 2010, having been together for 20 years. In an interview in 2011, Plate stated that he and Sommer remained on good terms with each other and were neighbours.

== Discography ==
=== Studio albums ===
Title	Album details	Peak chart positions		
Title	Album details	GER	AUT	SWI
Schüchtern ist mein Glück	Released: 5 April 2013; Label: Island (Universal Music Group); Formats: CD, digital download, vinyl	29	—	—
"—" denotes album that did not chart or was not released.

=== Singles ===
Year	Title	Peak chart positions			Album
Year	Title	GER	AUT	SWI	Album
2013	"Wir beide sind Musik"	86	—	—	Schüchtern ist mein Glück
2013	"Elektrisch"	—	—	—	Schüchtern ist mein Glück
"—" denotes single that did not chart or was not released.
