= Don't Look Back Into the Darkness =

Studio album by The Grand Opening
- Released: 2013
- Recorded: 2012
- Genres: alternative rock, slowcore
- Label: Tapete Records
- Producer: John Roger Olsson

The Grand Opening chronology
In the Midst of Your Drama (2010)	Don't Look Back Into the Darkness (2013)

Professional ratings
Review scores
Source	Rating
Ikon 1931	(4/5)
Staf Magazine	(8/10)
Whisperin and Hollerin	(7/10)
Violent Success	(9,5/10)
Daily Express	(4/5)
Nöjesguiden	(5/6)

Don't Look Back Into the Darkness is the fourth full-length recording by Swedish band The Grand Opening. Originally released on Hamburg label Tapete Records.

== Track listing ==
1. "Blacker Than Blue"
2. "False Light"
3. "Towards Your Final Rest"
4. "Free"
5. "There Is Always Hope"
6. "Old News"
7. "Target"
8. "The Living"
9. "Over the Fences"
10. "Tired Eyes"

== Personnel ==
- John Roger Olsson: vocals, electric guitar, acoustic guitar, keyboards, upright piano, vibraphone, xylophone, organ, percussion
- Jens Pettersson: drums
- Otto Johansson: baritone guitar
- Patric Thorman: electric bass, double bass
- Leo Svensson Sander: cello, organ, saw, synthesizer
- Anna Ödlund: backing vocals
- Johan Krantz: backing vocals
- Johan Norin: trumpet
