= Ten Thousand Bars =

- Ten Thousand Bars

Studio album by Ezio
- Released: 2006
- Recorded: 2006
- Genre: Folk
- Length: 52:10
- Language: English
- Label: Tapete Records
- Producer: Lee Russell

Ezio chronology
Live:Cambridge (2004)	Ten Thousand Bars (2006)	Lost and Found (Volume 2) (2006)

Ten Thousand Bars is the eighth album, and the sixth studio album, by Ezio, released in 2006.

== Track listing ==
All songs written by Ezio Lunedei.

1. "All I really want" – 3:11
2. "Thin line" – 5:14
3. "Mandolin song" – 3:01
4. "Hotel Motel" – 2:43
5. "Holding you now" – 4:11
6. "All for you" – 3:57
7. "Ten thousand bars" – 3:42
8. "I want you back" – 3:47
9. "Friends again" – 5:41
10. "Woohoohoo" – 4:26
11. "Call me up" – 5:03
12. "If you want to go" – 4:09
13. "Circus revisited" – 3:06

== Credits ==
- Ezio – guitar, vocals
- Booga – guitar
- Lidia Cascarino – bass
- Alex Reeves – drums
- Lee Russell – percussion

Guest performances from:

- Peter van Hooke – drums
- Ian Close
- Tiffany Gore – vocals
- Rebecca Hayne

== Production ==
- Produced and engineered by Lee Russell at Dulcitone
- Additional engineering and mixing by Graham Bonnett
- Artwork by Lena Rocker
