= Sinnbus =

German record label

Sinnbus / Records + Publishing
- Founded: 2003
- Genre: Indie-pop, noise, postrock, electronica
- Country of origin: Germany
- Location: Wedding, Berlin
- Official website: www.sinnbus.de

Sinnbus is an independent record label and music publisher founded in Berlin, Germany, in 2003. The style of music released by Sinnbus varies from post-rock, post-punk, indie, and electronica.

It first started as a loose network of friends, musicians, and artists releasing albums and booking gigs independently. They started with a sampler of local bands. Their first album they had released was SDNMT 2003.

In 2013 Sinnbus celebrated its 10th anniversary and has released its 50th full album since they've started.

== Artists ==
- Alarma Man
- Audrey
- Barra Head
- Bodi Bill
- Einar Stray Orchestra
- Me and My Drummer
- Rue Royale
- The/Das
- Troy von Balthazar
- We Are the City
