= Friends Again =

Friends Again may refer to:

In music:

- Friends Again (band)
- Friends Again, a single by My Morning Jacket
- Friends Again, a soundtrack of the television series Friends
- "Friends Again", a song from album Friends for Life by Montserrat Caballé
- "Friends Again", a song from album Rub It Better by General Public
- "Friends Again", a song from album Ten Thousand Bars by Ezio

In television:

- Friends Again (TV series)
- "Friends Again", an episode of The Real World: Sydney
- "Friends Again???", an episode of The Story of Tracy Beaker
