= Darlo =

Darlo may refer to:

- Darlington, a town in north east England.
  - Darlington F.C., an English football club
- Darlinghurst, New South Wales, an inner-city suburb of Sydney, Australia.
- Darlo (band), German alternative, indie, rock band, on Tapete Records
