= This Is Nowhere to Be Found =

This Is Nowhere to be Found

Studio album by The Grand Opening
- Released: 2006
- Recorded: 2006
- Genre: Ambient, alternative rock, slowcore
- Label: Tapete Records
- Producer: John Roger Olsson

The Grand Opening chronology
Location EP (2005)	This Is Nowhere to be Found (2006)	Beyond the Brightness (2008)

Professional ratings
Review scores
Source	Rating
Soundmag	(7/10)
Göteborgs Posten	(2/5)
Americana UK	(6/10)

This Is Nowhere to be Found is the first full-length recording by Swedish band The Grand Opening. Originally released on Hamburg label Tapete Records.

== Track listing ==
1. "This Time I Might"
2. "Don't Drop Off"
3. "Forever"
4. "Darkness Save Us"
5. "Blood on the Moon"
6. "Secret View"
7. "Ensillre"
8. "Get Out"
9. "So Be It"
10. "Twist and Turn"

== Personnel ==
- John Roger Olsson: vocals, guitar, drums, bass, Fender Rhodes
- Jens Pettersson: drums
