= Anajo =

German band

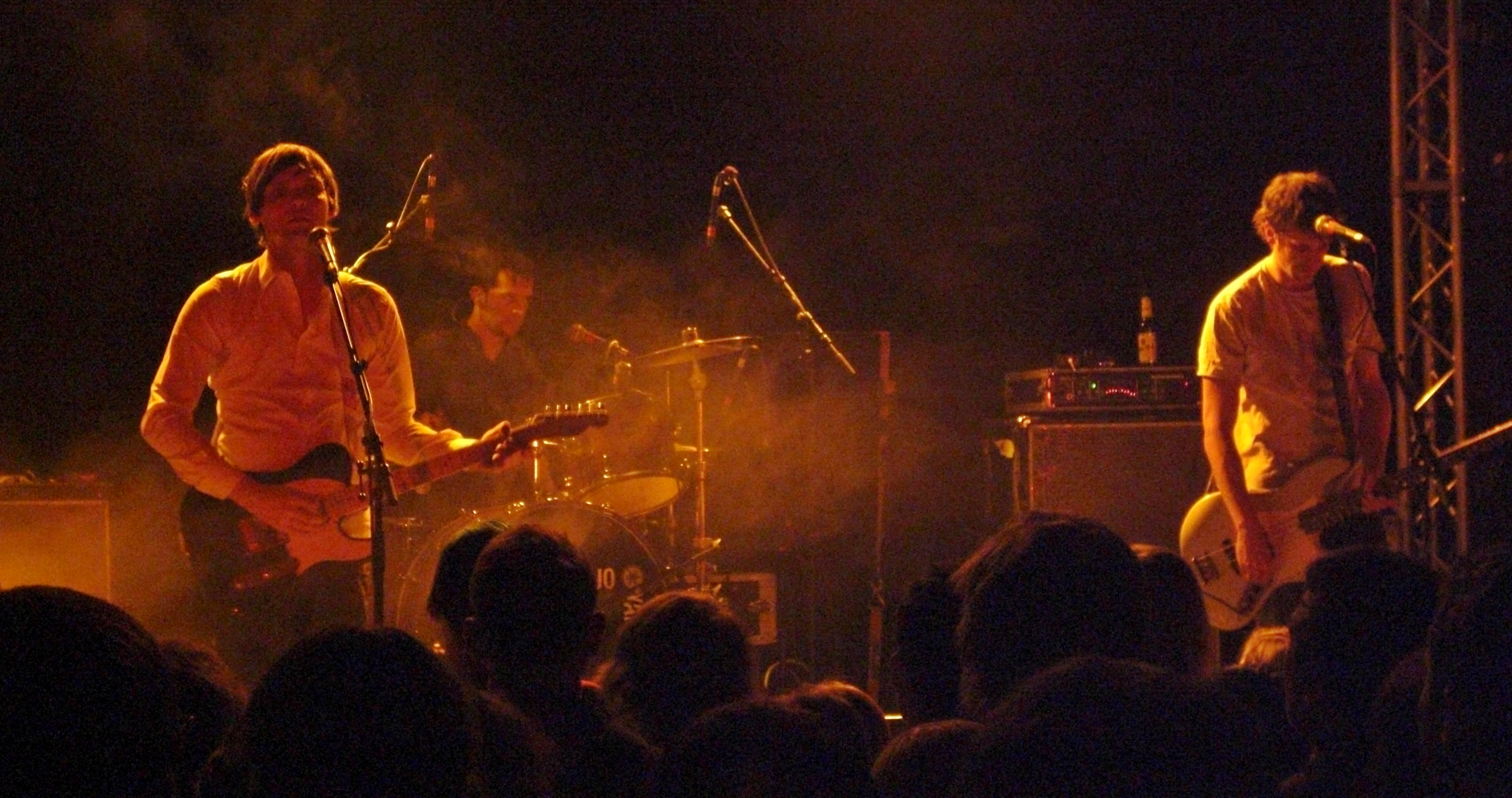
- Anajo performing at the Lido club in Berlin, Germany in 2009

Background information
- Origin: Augsburg, Germany
- Genre: Indie pop
- Years active: 1999–2014
- Label: Tapete
- Past members: Oliver Gottwald; Michael Schmidt; Ingolf Nössner
- Website: www.anajo.de (in German)

Anajo (German pronunciation: [aˈnaːjo]) was an indie pop band from Augsburg, Germany that was active between 1999 and 2014. Consisting of Oliver Gottwald (vocals, guitar), Michael Schmidt (bass, keyboards) and Ingolf Nössner (drums), the band produced guitar pop with electronic sounds, these being more prominent in earlier recordings. Anajo's debut album was released in 2004 and the band went on to record three further albums, the most commercially successful reaching No. 51 in the German charts.

== History ==
=== Early years ===
Anajo was formed in Augsburg in 1999 after school friends Oliver Gottwald and Michael Schmidt, who had both already had experience of playing in other bands, got in contact with drummer Ingolf Nössner via a local ad. The name of the band came about by accident while the band members were watching Italian-German film Banana Joe on a defective television, where the only part of the title that was visible was "ana Jo".

During the early years of Anajo, the band recorded various demo CDs, selling them at concerts and on the band's website. One of the band's early songs was "Ich hol dich hier raus" (I'm getting you out of here), which was based on the theme tune of German television series Ein Fall für zwei. The song entered the top 5 of the listeners' chart of Austrian youth radio station FM4 and was later released in May 2004 as a single after the band had signed with Hamburg indie label Tapete Records.

=== Album releases ===
Anajo's debut album, Nah bei mir (Close to me), was released in October 2004. Consisting of songs from the band's demo CDs, the album was positively received by Rainer Henze of music magazine laut.de, who described the band's sound as fresh, breezy, absolutely contemporary guitar pop with subtly playful electronic elements. Linus Volkmann, writing in music magazine Intro, found good songs throughout the whole album, the highlights for him being "Monika Tanzband" (Monika dance band) and "Honigmelone" (Honeydew).

New songs were written for Anajo's second album, Hallo, wer kennt hier eigentlich wen? (Hello, who here actually knows whom?), which came out in February 2007. Three of the new songs were introduced beforehand in the EP Spätsommersonne (Late summer sun), which was released in 2006 and also contained two live recordings. The new album saw a development in Anajo's sound, with the band making greater use of guitars and less use of programmed sounds. The album entered the German albums chart, where it peaked at No. 51.

Also in 2007, Anajo competed in the Bundesvision Song Contest on German television, performing the song "Wenn du nur wüsstest" (If only you knew), which featured a duet with singer Suzie Kerstgens from German band Klee. Representing the German state of Bavaria, Anajo finished in ninth place in the competition. The song was also released as a single, which reached No. 58 in the German singles chart.

For Anajo's tenth anniversary, the band re-recorded various songs with the pop orchestra from the University of Augsburg, releasing them on the album Anajo und das Poporchester (Anajo and the pop orchestra) in November 2009. The album also featured "Jungen weinen nicht", a cover of the song "Boys Don't Cry" by English rock band The Cure.

Anajo's fourth album, Drei (Three), was released in February 2011. For the recording of the album, the band virtually avoided using electronic devices and recorded all instrumentation live, using a fourth musician, Albrecht Schröder, to provide the keyboard sounds.

=== Indefinite break ===
In 2014, the members of Anajo decided to part ways. On the official Anajo website, they stated that they were taking an indefinite break from the band owing to family commitments. In addition, Gottwald announced the upcoming release of his debut solo album in February 2015.

== Live performances ==
As well as touring Germany, Austria and Switzerland, Anajo also performed in Ukraine (2006) and Russia (2006 and 2010) following invitations from the Robert Bosch Stiftung and the Goethe-Institut, respectively. In 2008, Anajo toured with the pop orchestra from the University of Augsburg, holding concerts in Germany, Austria and Switzerland.

== Musical style ==
Anajo was described as an indie pop band by various journalists. In its biography of Anajo, music magazine laut.de referred to the clever melodies, unpretentious instrumentation and well chosen words in the band's music. Music website CDstart.de stated that Anajo made "feel-good" music ("Gute-Laune"-Musik) and remarked on the catchiness of the band's music and the simple song structures.

In response to accusations that the band sounded too poppy, Gottwald admitted in a 2007 interview that Anajo was a band that divided opinion, but added that the band's music came from the heart, which was why it sounded poppy and at times kitsch.

The lyrics for Anajo's songs were mostly written by Gottwald. In a 2011 interview, he stated that the lyrics were multifaceted, containing something for those feeling melancholic in a good way as well as for those in a good mood.

== Band members ==
- Oliver Gottwald – vocals, guitar
- Michael Schmidt – bass, keyboards
- Ingolf Nössner – drums

== Discography ==
=== Albums ===
- Nah bei mir (Tapete Records/Indigo, October 2004)
- Hallo, wer kennt hier eigentlich wen? (Tapete Records/Indigo, February 2007)
- Anajo und das Poporchester (Tapete Records/Indigo, November 2009)
- Drei (Tapete Records/Indigo, February 2011)

=== Extended plays ===
- Spätsommersonne (Tapete Records/Indigo, September 2006)

=== Singles ===
- "Ich hol dich hier raus" (Tapete Records/Indigo, May 2004)
- "Monika Tanzband" (Tapete Records/Indigo, April 2005)
- "Wenn du nur wüsstest" (Tapete Records/Indigo, January 2007)
- "Hotelboy" (Tapete Records/Indigo, 2007) – promo
- "Jungs weinen nicht" (Tapete Records/Indigo, October 2009)
- "Mädchenmusik" (Tapete Records/Indigo, November 2010)

=== Self-released demo CDs ===
- Pop und die Welt (1999)
- Geboren für die Stadt (2000)
- Tanz Tanz Band (2002)
- Vorhang auf (2003)

== Awards ==
- 2001: Winner of the Augsburg competition Band des Jahres (Band of the year)
- 2007: Bayrischer Musiklöwe (Bavarian music lion) for best Bavarian indie band
