= Angel Song =

(The) Angel Song may refer to:

- Angel Song (album), a 1997 album by Kenny Wheeler, or the title track
- Angel Song (song), a 2024 song by Nothing More featuring David Draiman
- The Angel Song (album), a 1993 album by Ezio
- The Angel Song (song), a 1989 single by Great White

== See also ==
- Angel Song (Eve no Kane), a single by the Brilliant Green
- Angelsong, a song by Coldplay from Moon Music
