= In the Midst of Your Drama =

Studio album by The Grand Opening
- Released: 2010
- Recorded: 2010
- Genre: Ambient, alternative rock, slowcore
- Label: Tapete Records
- Producer: John Roger Olsson

The Grand Opening chronology
| Beyond the Brightness (2008) | In the Midst of Your Drama (2010) | Don't Look Back Into the Darkness (2013) |

Professional ratings
Review scores
| Source | Rating |
|---|---|
| Sunday Times | (4/5) |
| Uncut | (4/5) |
| White Tapes | (3,5/5) |
| Nöjesguiden | (4/6) |
| nyaskivor.se | (3/5) |

In the Midst of Your Drama is the third full-length recording by Swedish band The Grand Opening. Originally released on Hamburg label Tapete Records.

== Track listing ==
1. "Through Your Shield"
2. "Habits"
3. "Be Steady"
4. "Faults and Errors"
5. "Exit"
6. "Breakdown"
7. "Forsaken"
8. "The Time Remaining"
9. "This Way Suits Me Well"
10. "In the Midst of Your Drama"

== Personnel ==
- John Roger Olsson: vocals, guitar, vibraphone
- Jens Pettersson: drums, backing vocals, bass, guitar
- Otto Johansson: guitar, bass
- Anders Ljung: wurlitzer
- Linus Giertta: piano
- Anna Ödlund: backing vocals
- Johannes Mayer: backing vocals
- Johan Jonsson: trumpet
