= Beyond the Brightness =

Studio album by The Grand Opening
- Released: 2008
- Recorded: 2008
- Genre: Ambient, alternative rock, slowcore, post-rock
- Label: Tapete Records
- Producer: John Roger Olsson

The Grand Opening chronology
This Is Nowhere to Be Found (2006)	Beyond the Brightness (2008)	In the Midst of Your Drama (2010)

Professional ratings
Review scores
Source	Rating
Sonic Magazine	(7/10)
It's a Trap!	(8/10)
The Gap	(7/10)

Beyond the Brightness is the second full-length recording by Swedish band The Grand Opening. Originally released on Hamburg label Tapete Records.

== Track listing ==
1. "Anxious Looks"
2. "Secrets Revealed"
3. "On the Losing End"
4. "Lonely Hearts Night Out"
5. "Beyond the Brightness"
6. "Dark Dark Dawn"
7. "Chainbreak"
8. "Convenient Situations"
9. "Trapdoor"

== Personnel ==
- John Roger Olsson: vocals, guitar, drums, bass, vibraphone, Fender Rhodes
- Jens Pettersson: drums, backing vocals
