= Sun Structures =

2014 studio album by Temples

Studio album by Temples
- Released: 5 February 2014
- Studios: Pyramid (Kettering, England)
- Genres: Neo-psychedelia; psychedelic pop
- Length: 52:48
- Label: Heavenly
- Producer: James Bagshaw

Temples chronology
Sun Structures (2014)	Volcano (2017)

Professional ratings
Aggregate scores
Source	Rating
AnyDecentMusic?	7.0/10
Metacritic	72/100
Review scores
Source	Rating
AllMusic	4/5 stars
Exclaim!	9/10
Financial Times	4/5 stars
The Guardian	3/5 stars
The Independent	3/5 stars
NME	8/10
Pitchfork	5.5/10
Q	3/5 stars
Rolling Stone	3/5 stars
Uncut	8/10

Sun Structures is the debut studio album by English rock band Temples, released on 5 February 2014 by Heavenly Recordings. The building shown on the album cover is the Rushton Triangular Lodge near Rushton, Northamptonshire. The song "Keep in the Dark" is played over the closing credits to the 2015 thriller film The Gift.

== Singles ==
"Shelter Song" was sent to US modern rock radio by Fat Possum Records on 15 April 2014.

== Track listing ==
Sun Structures – standard edition
No.	Title	Lyrics	Length
1.	"Shelter Song"	James Bagshaw	3:10
2.	"Sun Structures"	Thomas Walmsley	5:12
3.	"The Golden Throne"	Bagshaw	4:10
4.	"Keep in the Dark"	Walmsley	4:36
5.	"Mesmerise"	Bagshaw	3:42
6.	"Move with the Season"	Bagshaw; Walmsley	5:10
7.	"Colours to Life"	Bagshaw; Walmsley	5:11
8.	"A Question Isn't Answered"	Bagshaw; Walmsley	5:11
9.	"The Guesser"	Bagshaw	4:06
10.	"Test of Time"	Bagshaw	3:53
11.	"Sand Dance"	Walmsley	6:31
12.	"Fragment's Light"	Bagshaw; Walmsley	1:57
Total length:			52:48

Sun Structures – Japanese edition bonus tracks
No.	Title	Length
13.	"Shelter Song" (Society Remix)	3:09
14.	"Mesmerise" (Time and Space Machine Remix)	7:33
Total length:		1:03:30

Sun Structures – iTunes Store deluxe edition bonus tracks
No.	Title	Length
13.	"Shelter Song" (Jagwar Ma Jono's Wrong Mix)	5:26
14.	"Shelter Song" (Justin Robertson's Deadstock 33s Remix)	6:21
15.	"Mesmerise" (Time and Space Machine Remix)	7:33
16.	"Shelter Song" (Society Remix)	3:09
Total length:		1:15:17

== Personnel ==
Temples

- James Bagshaw
- Thomas Walmsley
- Adam Smith
- Samuel Toms

Technical

- James Bagshaw – production (all tracks); mixing (tracks 1, 12)
- Claudius Mittendorfer – mixing (tracks 2–11)
- Noel Summerville – mastering

Artwork

- Abbie Stephens – artwork, photography
- Zoë Maxwell – artwork, photography
- Thomas Caslin – design, layout

== Charts ==
Chart performance for "Sun Structures"
Chart (2014)	Peak position
Australian Albums (ARIA)	55
Austrian Albums (Ö3 Austria)	69
Belgian Albums (Ultratop Flanders)	80
Belgian Albums (Ultratop Wallonia)	58
Dutch Albums (Album Top 100)	36
French Albums (SNEP)	66
German Albums (Offizielle Top 100)	47
Irish Albums (IRMA)	69
Irish Independent Albums (IRMA)	10
Scottish Albums (Official Charts)	17
Swiss Albums (Schweizer Hitparade)	24
UK Albums (Official Charts)	7
UK Independent Albums (Official Charts)	2
US Billboard 200	163
US Heatseekers Albums (Billboard)	4
US Independent Albums (Billboard)	31
US Top Rock Albums (Billboard)	44
US Indie Store Album Sales (Billboard)	21

== Release history ==
Release history for Sun Structure
Region	Date	Label	Ref.
Japan	5 February 2014	Hostess	
Australia	7 February 2014	[PIAS] Australia	
Ireland	7 February 2014	Heavenly	
United Kingdom	10 February 2014	Heavenly	
France	10 February 2014	[PIAS] Cooperative	
United States	11 February 2014	Fat Possum	
Germany	14 February 2014	[PIAS] Cooperative	
