= Black Boots on Latin Feet =

- Black Boots on Latin Feet

Studio album by Ezio
- Released: 1995
- Recorded: 1995
- Genre: Folk
- Length: 57.4 minutes
- Language: English
- Label: Arista
- Producer: Rupert Hine

Ezio chronology
The Angel Song (1993)	Black Boots on Latin Feet (1995)	Diesel Vanilla (1997)

Black Boots on Latin Feet is the second studio album by Ezio, released in 1995. The album, which takes its name from the lyrics of its opening song, Saxon Street, was released on the Arista Records label. Much is made of the fact that Tony Blair picked track 4, Cancel Today, as one of his Desert Island Discs when he appeared on that show in 1996, as at the time few people had heard of the band.

== Track listing ==
All songs written by Ezio Lunedei

1. "Saxon Street" – 4:48
2. "30 and confused" – 4:31
3. "Just to talk to you again" – 4:24
4. "Cancel today" – 4:51
5. "Go" – 4:53
6. "Steal away" – 3:53
7. "The further we stretch" – 3:39
8. "Tuesday night" – 6:07
9. "Thousand years" – 4:20
10. "Agony" – 3:04
11. "Wild side" – 3:49
12. "Brave man" – 3:48
13. "Angel song" – 5:20

== Credits ==
- Ezio – guitar, vocals
- Booga – guitar
- Jean-Michel Biger – drums
- Sydney Thiam – percussion
- Rupert Hine – keyboards, bass and backing vocals

== See also ==
- 1995 in music
