= Ezio (band) =

British folk music band

- The Ezio logo

Background information
- Origin: Cambridge, England
- Genres: Folk
- Years active: 1990 – date
- Label: Tapete Records
- Members: Ezio; Booga; Lidia Cascarino; Lee Russell; Alex Reeves
- Past members: Peter Van Hooke
- Website: ezio.co.uk

Ezio is a folk band from Cambridge, England, formed in 1990. They are named after their lead singer and main composer, Ezio Lunedei.

== Members ==
- Ezio Lunedei, lead singer, guitar and main composer
- Mark "Booga" Fowell, guitar
- Lidia Cascarino, bass
- Lee Russell, percussion, steel guitar and other instruments
- Alex Reeves, drums.

The band vary their on-stage line-up depending on the venue; some gigs feature all five members in the line-up, whereas some gigs in smaller venues will have just Ezio and Fowell.

== Career ==
Ezio was formed 1988 or 1989 (age 36–37), by a duo of guitarists, Ezio Lunedei—of Italian descent—and Mark "Booga" Fowell—from Kenya. The former had been working as a surveyor and the latter studying to be a biochemist. The band self released their first two albums, before being picked up by Arista Records, in 1995.

Their profile was raised considerably when their song Cancel Today was chosen by Tony Blair for his Desert Island Discs selection. This led the song to enjoy "unforeseen airplay" and discussion, and reportedly led to shops selling out of their CDs.

The band has released eight studio albums, one compilation album, four live albums and three videos / DVDs.

== Discography ==
=== Studio albums ===
- The Angel Song (1993) – Salami Records
- Black Boots on Latin Feet (1995) – Arista Records
- Diesel Vanilla (1997) – Arista Records
- Higher (2000) – Salami Records
- The Making of Mr. Spoons (2003) – Eagle Records
- Ten Thousand Bars (2006) – Tapete Records
- This Is the Day (2010) – Tapete Records
- Adam and the Snake (2014) – Tapete Records
- Daylight Moon (2016) – Jazzhaus Records

=== Compilation albums ===
- Lost and Found (Volume 2) (2006) – Salami Records

=== Live albums ===
- Live at the Shepherds Bush Empire (1999) – Salami Records
- Live:Cambridge (2004) – Salami Records
- Das Bootleg – Live in Mannheim (Part 1) (2008) – Salami Records
- Ten Thousand Bars – Live (2008) – Tapete Records

=== DVDs ===
- Ezio Live (1996) – Salami Records
- Live at the Shepherds Bush Empire (1999) – Salami Records
- Live at the Junction (2005) – Salami Records
