= Lee Russell (music producer) =

English record produced and musician (born 1970)

Lee Russell (born 1970) is an English record producer and musician.

Lee has produced records for artists including:

- Kate Walsh
- Ezio
- Melanie Blatt
- Paul Carrack
- Dirk Darmstaedter
- John Butler (Diesel Park West)
- Nada Surf
- The Moons
- Liam Dullaghan
- Cheryl Cole
- My First Tooth
- Sukie
- Thrulk
- Birthday Sex
- Reuben Hollebon

Lee currently works mostly from his private recording studio (a converted chapel in the Northamptonshire countryside).
