= The Grand Opening (band) =

Swedish indie band

- Origin: Ånge, Sweden
- Genres: Alternative rock, indie rock, sadcore, slowcore, folk
- Instruments: Drums, guitar, keyboards, bass, trumpet, cello
- Years active: 1999–present
- Labels: Tapete, It's a Trap! Records
- Members: John Roger Olsson; Jens Pettersson; Otto Johansson
- Past members: Anders Ljung; Jimmy Ottosson; Leif Elverstig; Fredrik Pålsson; Johanna Ojala; Joakim Labraaten
- Website: www.tgomusic.com

The Grand Opening (TGO) is the musical alias of the Swedish musician John Roger Olsson. TGO releases records on the Hamburg, Germany based label Tapete Records. In July 2013 Tapete Records announced that TGO will release the new album Don't Look Back Into The Darkness on October 11.

== Biography ==
The Grand Opening started as four piece based in Ånge, Sweden in 1999. After being active as a band for two years, singer and songwriter John Roger Olsson moved to Stockholm and restarted the band. During the years, The Grand Opening has had many different members for both live shows and recordings. Their first release was the free digital EP Location which was released by It's a Trap! Records in 2005.

== Discography ==
Albums

- 2006: This Is Nowhere to Be Found (Tapete Records)
- 2008: Beyond the Brightness (Tapete Records)
- 2010: In the Midst of Your Drama (Tapete Records)
- 2013: Don't Look Back Into the Darkness (Tapete Records)

Singles and EPs

- 2005: Location EP (It's a Trap! Records)
- 2006: "Don't Drop Off/So Be It" 7"
- 2006: "Get Out" CDS
- 2010: "Be Steady" CDS

Compilation appearances

- Something Must Break Volume One
- It's a Trap! readers Companion Volume Two
- SPEX CD #69
- Tapete 100
- Did You D:qliq?
- Acoustic Songs 2
- This is Tapete Records!
