= Live at the Shepherds Bush Empire =

- Live at the Shepherds Bush Empire

Live album by Ezio
- Released: 1999
- Recorded: 5 March 1999
- Genre: Folk
- Length: 60.1 minutes
- Language: English
- Label: Salami Records
- Producer: Ezio Lunedei

Ezio chronology
Diesel Vanilla (1997)	Live at the Shepherds Bush Empire (1999)	Higher (2000)

Live at the Shepherds Bush Empire is the fourth album, and the first live album, by Ezio, recorded live at the Shepherds Bush Empire in London, England on 5 March 1999 and released later that year.

== Credits ==
- Ezio – guitar, vocals
- Booga – guitar
- Lidia Cascarino – bass
- Peter Van Hooke – drums
- Produced by Salami Records
- Directed by Phil Gaze
- Recorded and mixed by Graham Bonnett

== Track listing ==
All songs written by Ezio Lunedei except where noted.

1. "Angel Song" – 5:46
2. "The Oranges Song" – 4:27
3. "Go" – 4:53
4. "Alex" – 5:54
5. "At that moment" – 7:01
6. "Sweet Thing / Tuesday Night" – 10:55 (Van Morrison), (Lunedei)
7. "Deeper" – 4:45
8. "Just to talk to you again" – 4:02
9. "The further we stretch" – 5:15
10. "One more walk round the dancefloor" – 4:55
11. "Saxon Street" – 10:28
