= Einar Stray Orchestra =

Norwegian indie-pop and post-rock band

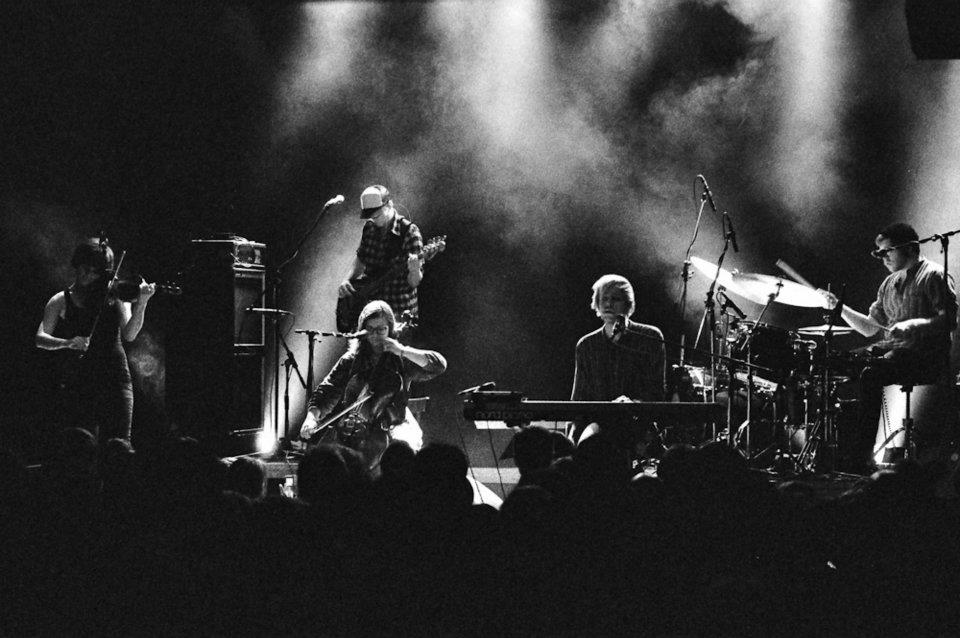
- Einar Stray Orchestra live in Prague, 2012

Background information
- Origin: Sandvika, Norway
- Genres: Indie pop, Post-rock
- Years active: 2006 - present
- Labels: Riot Factory, Sinnbus
- Members: Einar Stray; Maja Gravermoen Toresen; Ofelia Østrem Ossum; Steinar Glas; Lars Fremmerlid
- Past members: Hanna Vik Furuseth; Simen Aasen
- Website: www.einarstrayorchestra.com

Einar Stray Orchestra is a Norwegian indie-pop and post-rock band. The young quintet have released three albums to rave critics, two EP's, and have played more than 300 concerts in Europe/Asia. Combining classical and folk music with pop and rock they have played several sold-out headliner tours and festivals. Einar Stray Orchestra is influenced by bands such as Sufjan Stevens, Bright Eyes, and Godspeed You! Black Emperor.

== History ==
Einar Stray started recording songs in his bedroom in Sandvika, a little town located in the south west of Oslo in 2006 and uploaded them to Myspace. As an experimental singer/songwriter he brought musician friends with him on stage, and together they produced music both delicate and grandiose with strings, blows, percussion, choir parts, noisy guitars, and a classical inspired piano style - counting 11 band members at its most.

After meeting the Norwegian artist Moddi in 2008, they quickly joined forces and released their debut EPs together, as a split-vinyl. "Favors And Fields/Rubato EP" resulted in their first tour through Norway, including big festivals like Slottsfjell, By:larm and Øya. Moddi and Einar has appeared in each other's bands ever since.

In 2011, the band got compressed into a five-piece, and released their debut album, Chiaroscuro, in Germany, Austria, Switzerland, Japan and Norway of which Terese Blåklokke did the artwork.

With a range from noisy post-rock ballads to stripped down a cappella songs the band toured all of 2012, and gave also birth to "For The Country EP". They ended the year opening for Múm and Under Byen in Russia.

The second album Politricks was released in 2014 which had been rated by The Line of Best Fit as following:

“There's so much going on that it's difficult to glean much upon initial listens – it's probably a little alienating, but if you do manage to persevere and penetrate the gloopy outer shell, you'll be rewarded with an opulent, everchanging chimera of a record.”

It was Simen Sandbæk Skari of the band Team Me who did the artwork of this cover.

In May 2015 the band announced that they are working on their third album, coming out in 2016.

== Discography ==
=== Albums ===
- 2011: Chiaroscuro (Nordic version - Spoon Train Audio)
- 2012: Chiaroscuro (European version - Sinnbus)
- 2014: Politricks (Riot Factory/Sinnbus)
- 2017: Dear Bigotry (Sinnbus)

=== EPs ===
- 2008: Favors And Fields (EP - Spoon Train Audio)
- 2012: For the Country (EP - Sinnbus)
