= Eight Rounds Rapid =

British rock band

- Origin: Southend, Essex, England
- Genres: Punk rock, punk blues, pub rock
- Years active: 2010–present
- Label: Cadiz
- Members: David Burke (David Alexander); Lee Watkins; Simon Johnson; Jules Cooper
- Website: http://www.eightroundsrapid.com/

Eight Rounds Rapid are a British four-piece punk/blues band from Southend, Essex, England. The band was formed in 2010 by drummer Lee Watkins and vocalist David Alexander (David Burke), with guitarist Simon Johnson; they were joined in 2012 by bassist Jules Cooper. Saxophonist George Cleghorn has sometimes joined the band when recording and performing. The band released their first video Stalker in 2011, followed by Channel Swimmer in 2012, and Talent in 2013, the same year as their debut 7" single Writeabout/Steve, released on Podrophenia Records. All appeared on their well-received debut album Lossleader, issued in 2014 by Cadiz Music, bringing the group comparisons to Alternative TV and Wire as well as various pub rock bands.

The band gained radio support from Tom Robinson, Gary Crowley, and Mark Radcliffe and further positive reviews including ones from Uncut, Mojo, and Classic Rock.

Eight Rounds Rapid toured supporting Simon Johnson's father Wilko Johnson in 2013 and again in 2015.

Their second album Object D’Art was released in 2017, previewed by a new video for "I Like It" starring Ewen MacIntosh.

The band's third studio album was released in August 2020 on Hamburg label Tapete Records, to further critical acclaim. Narc magazine called it "Witty, caustic, clever, so catchy... [a] bittersweet love letter posted from an outpost in the pandemic provinces."

== Discography ==
=== Albums ===
- Lossleader, CD, 2014
- Object D'Art, LP/CD/DL, 2017
- Love Your Work, LP/CD/DL, 2020

=== Singles ===
- "Writeabout" / "Steve", 7", 2013

=== Compilation appearances ===
- "Channel Swimmer", Under the Gun, Vive Le Rock, 2014
- "Bully Boy", Dirty Mod, Well Suspect, 2016
