= Diesel Vanilla =

- Diesel Vanilla

Studio album by Ezio
- Released: 1997
- Recorded: 1997
- Genre: Folk
- Length: 44.1 minutes
- Language: English
- Label: Arista
- Producer: Ezio Lunedei

Ezio chronology
Black Boots on Latin Feet (1995)	Diesel Vanilla (1997)	Live at the Shepherds Bush Empire (1999)

Diesel Vanilla is the third studio album by Ezio, released in 1997.

== Track listing ==
1. "Deeper" – 4:14
2. "Moon" – 4:22
3. "Accordion Girl" – 4:50
4. "Cinderella" – 4:20
5. "One more walk round the dancefloor" – 4:56
6. "Maybe sometimes" – 4:18
7. "Alex" – 4:25
8. "Call you tomorrow" – 3:59
9. "All the dreams" – 4:38
10. "Back on your own again" – 4:06

== Personnel ==
- Mark "Booga" Fowell – guitar
- Ezio Lunedei – guitar
