= Higher (Ezio album) =

- Higher

Studio album by Ezio
- Released: 2000
- Recorded: 2000
- Genre: Folk
- Length: 50:01
- Language: English
- Label: Salami Records
- Producer: Ezio Lunedei

Ezio chronology
Live at the Shepherds Bush Empire (1999)	Higher (2000)	The Making of Mr. Spoons (2003)

Higher is the fifth album, and the fourth studio album, by Ezio, released in 2000. Produced by Peter Van Hooke, the record also features contributions from Paul Carrack and Rod Argent.

== Track listing ==
All songs written by Ezio Lunedei except Sweet Thing, written by Van Morrison.

1. "Still ice cold" – 4:32
2. "At that moment" – 7:00
3. "You're strange" – 3:38
4. "Perfect" – 4:00
5. "Higher" – 4:50
6. "Meet me in the Gods" – 6:17
7. "Oranges" – 4:57
8. "Anymore" – 4:41
9. "Freedom" – 5:15
10. "Sometimes silence" – 4:57

== See also ==
- 2000 in music
