= Volcano (Temples album) =

2017 studio album by Temples

Studio album by Temples
- Released: 3 March 2017
- Studios: Pyramid (Kettering, England); The Lodge (Northampton, England); Dulcitone
- Genres: Synth-pop; psychedelic pop; pop rock
- Length: 48:54
- Label: Heavenly
- Producer: James Bagshaw

Temples chronology
Sun Structures (2014)	Volcano (2017)	Hot Motion (2019)

Volcano is the second studio album by English rock band Temples, released on 3 March 2017 by Heavenly Recordings. The album was recorded at their home studio, and is self-produced.

Temples member James Bagshaw described the album as being "a result of implementing a load of things that we didn't know about the first time around [on Sun Structures]".

== Singles ==
"Certainty" was released as a single in September 2016. This was followed by a remixes EP of the single in November 2016, featuring remixes by Franz Ferdinand and Grumbling Fur Maschine. The second single "Strange or Be Forgotten" was released on 10 January 2017. This was also followed by a remix by Jono Ma of Jagwar Ma, titled "Strange or Be Forgottten" (Jono Ma Even Stranger Version) on 16 February 2017. A third single, "Born into the Sunset", was released on 27 February 2017.

== Critical reception ==
Professional ratings
Aggregate scores
Source	Rating
Metacritic	72/100
Review scores
Source	Rating
AllMusic	3.5/5 stars
Clash	8/10
Exclaim!	8/10
The Guardian	3/5 stars
The Independent	1/5 stars
NME	4/5 stars

At Metacritic, which assigns a normalised rating out of 100 to reviews from mainstream critics, the album received an average score of 72, based on 18 reviews, which indicates "generally favorable" reviews.

In a positive review, Clash said that the album was "rich in intricately layered synths, blending swathes of influences into a more distinctive sound". However, The Independent viewed Volcano in a more negative light, criticising the change in direction from their previous release, Sun Structures.

== Track listing ==
No.	Title	Lyrics	Music	Length
1.	"Certainty"	James Bagshaw	Bagshaw	4:24
2.	"All Join In"	Adam Smith; Tom Walmsley	Smith; Walmsley	4:08
3.	"I Wanna Be Your Mirror"	Bagshaw; Walmsley; Smith	Bagshaw	4:46
4.	"Oh! The Saviour"	Bagshaw	Bagshaw; Smith	3:45
5.	"Born into the Sunset"	Bagshaw; Walmsley	Bagshaw	4:46
6.	"How Would You Like to Go?"	Smith	Smith	3:35
7.	"Open Air"	Bagshaw	Bagshaw	4:46
8.	"In My Pocket"	Smith; Bagshaw; Walmsley	Smith; Bagshaw; Walmsley	3:03
9.	"Celebration"	Walmsley; Smith	Walmsley; Smith; Bagshaw	4:19
10.	"Mystery of Pop"	Bagshaw	Bagshaw	3:24
11.	"Roman God-Like Man"	Walmsley	Walmsley	3:50
12.	"Strange or Be Forgotten"	Bagshaw; Walmsley	Bagshaw	4:08
Total length:				48:54

Japanese edition bonus tracks
No.	Title	Length
13.	"Henry's Cake"	3:53
Total length:		52:47

French Fnac edition bonus tracks
No.	Title	Length
13.	"Fortune"	4:58
Total length:		53:52

== Personnel ==
=== Temples ===
- James Bagshaw
- Thomas Walmsley
- Adam Smith
- Samuel Toms

=== Technical ===
- James Bagshaw – production
- Eos Elka – mixing, additional programming
- Marta Salogni – mix engineering (tracks 1–4, 6–12)
- Claudius Mittendorfer – mix engineering (track 5)
- Guy Davie – mastering at Electric Mastering (London)

=== Artwork ===
- Jonathan Zawada – design
- Ed Miles – photography

== Charts ==
Chart performance for Volcano
Chart (2017)	Peak position
Australian Physical Albums (ARIA)	91
Belgian Albums (Ultratop Flanders)	128
Belgian Albums (Ultratop Wallonia)	33
Dutch Albums (Album Top 100)	69
French Albums (SNEP)	87
German Albums (Offizielle Top 100)	81
Scottish Albums (Official Charts)	35
Swiss Albums (Schweizer Hitparade)	39
UK Albums (Official Charts)	23
UK Independent Albums (Official Charts)	6
US Heatseekers Albums (Billboard)	2
US Independent Albums (Billboard)	13
US Top Album Sales (Billboard)	56
US Top Alternative Albums (Billboard)	25
US Top Current Album Sales (Billboard)	51
US Top Rock Albums (Billboard)	41
US Indie Store Album Sales (Billboard)	2
