= Suzie Kerstgens =

German singer

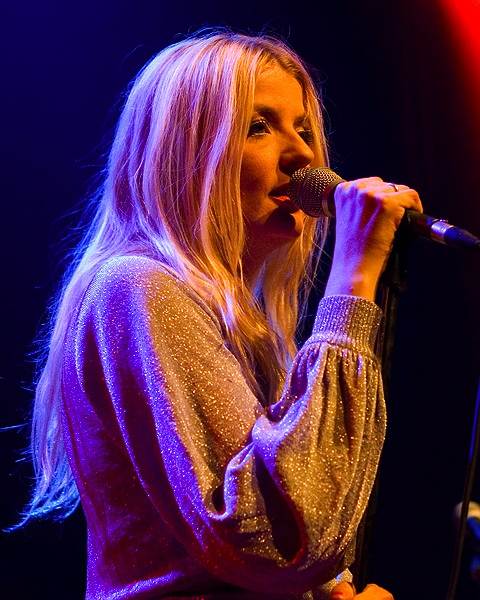
- Kerstgens performing in 2006

Background information
- Born: 1971 (age 54–55); Geldern, Germany
- Origin: Cologne, Germany
- Genre: Pop
- Occupations: Singer, songwriter
- Years active: Mid-nineties to present
- Labels: Logic (BMG), modernsoul (Ministry of Sound), Island (Universal)
- Website: www.kleemusik.de (in German)

Suzie Kerstgens (born 1971) is a German singer and lyricist. She is the lead vocalist and co-founder of German pop band Klee.

== Early life and education ==
Suzie Kerstgens was born in Germany, 1971, in the north-western town of Geldern and grew up in neighbouring Sonsbeck. During her youth, she received her secondary education at the gymnasium in Xanten and also completed classical ballet and dance training. She then studied philosophy and German studies at the University of Duisburg-Essen.

== Music career ==
In the mid-nineties, Kerstgens began working with musicians Sten Servaes and Tom Deininger in Cologne. With Kerstgens as lead vocalist, they formed the band Ralley, which was later renamed Klee. Klee is known for its songs about love, life and sorrow and the band members have been described as the great romantics of German pop by music magazine laut.de. Most of the lyrics for Klee's songs are written by Kerstgens and are based on her personal experiences. As a member of Ralley/Klee, Kerstgens has recorded seven albums, three of which have entered the top 20 of the German albums chart.

Kerstgens has made two appearances at the Bundesvision Song Contest, an annual competition shown on German television. The first was in 2005, when she performed the song "Gold" with Klee. The second was in 2007, when she sang a duet with German pop band Anajo on the band's song "Wenn du nur wüsstest".

Under the name "Kölsche Kylie", Kerstgens is active as a DJ at various venues in Cologne, including Gebäude 9.

=== Collaborations ===
Kerstgens has collaborated with English rock band The Wedding Present, contributing vocals on the 7" vinyl release of the band's single "I'm from Further North Than You" (2005). Another collaboration was with German rock band BAP on a re-recording of the band's song "Frau, ich freu mich" (2005).

== Social engagement ==
Kerstgens lends her support to various organizations in Germany, including Pro Asyl, Aktion Mensch, Fairtrade (Fair trade), Deutsche AIDS-Hilfe (German AIDS aid) and the National Paralympic Committee Germany. She is also a sponsor of the project "Schule ohne Rassismus – Schule mit Courage" (School without racism – school with courage) at her former gymnasium in Xanten.

== Personal life ==
Kerstgens lived in a flat share in the Sülz area of Cologne for 16 years. She then moved with her boyfriend to the Agnesviertel, another area of Cologne.

Kerstgens has been a fan of English rock bands The Cure and The Smiths since her childhood.

== Discography ==
Studio albums (Ralley)

- Ralley (1997)
- 1, 2, 3, 4 (1999)

Studio albums (Klee)

- Unverwundbar (2003)
- Jelängerjelieber (2004)
- Zwischen Himmel und Erde (2006)
- Berge versetzen (2008)
- Aus lauter Liebe (2011)
