= The/Das =

Berlin-based electronic music project

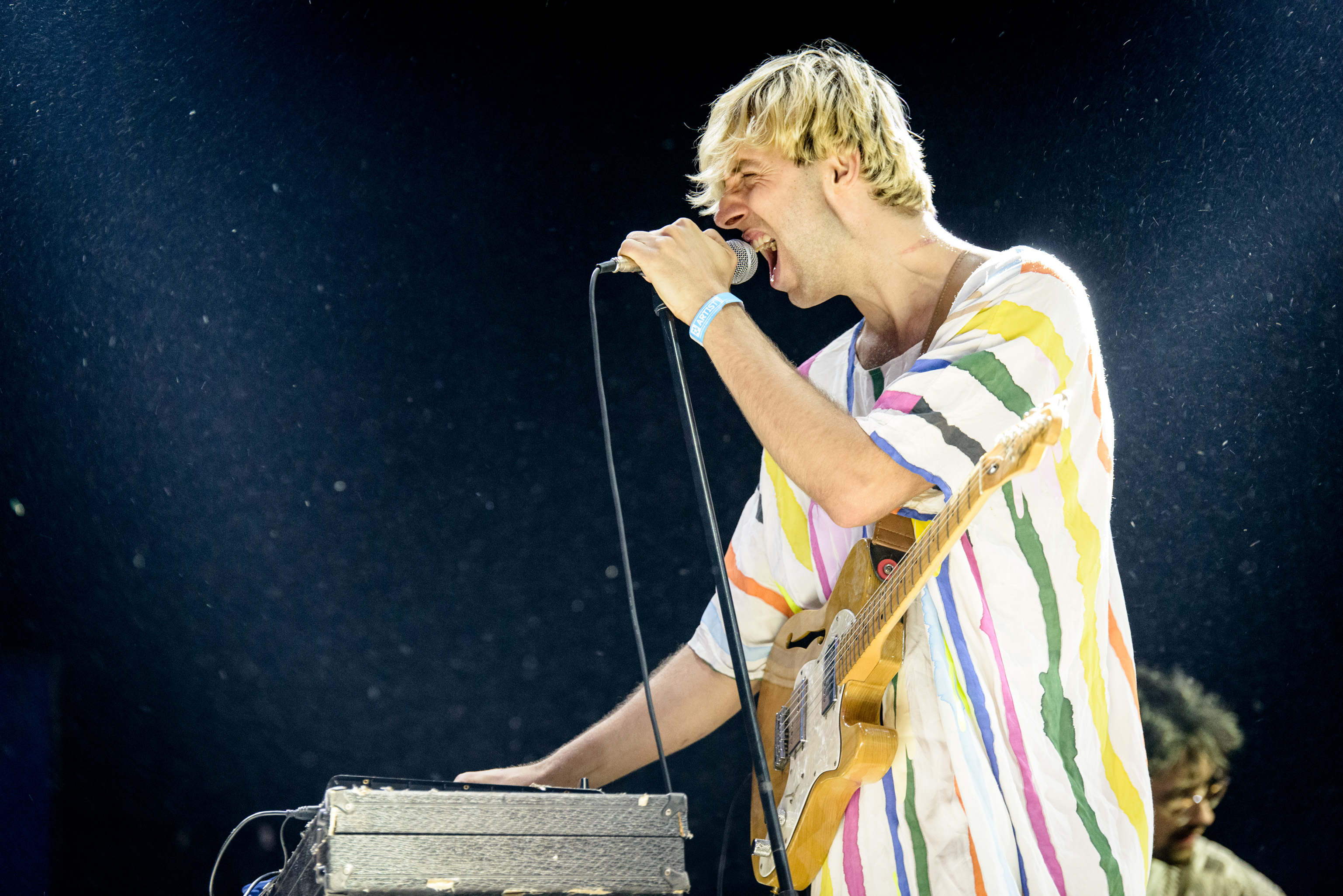

Background information
- Origin: Berlin, Germany
- Genre: Electronica
- Years active: 2012–present
- Labels: Life and Death, Sinnbus
- Members: Anton K. Feist; Fabian Fenk
- Website: www.the-das.com

The/Das is a Berlin-based music project formed by the former Bodi Bill members Anton K. Feist and Fabian Fenk in 2012.

== History ==
The/Das describe their music basically as Techno Tenderness. On stage The/Das usually performs with the support of the Apparat drummer Jörg Wähner and the DJ Thomalla.

Their first EP Fresh Water had been published in 2012 in collaboration with Tale Of Us via the Italian label Life and Death. They continued producing the EP Outfashioned in 2013.

By changing the label, the duo's EP Speak You Mind Speak was released via the independent label Sinnbus in 2013.

The recent LP Freezer was released in 2014. The video to the single My Made Up Spook was made while a trip to India.

That album received very positive reactions. The Line of Best Fit described the album as "wonderfully experimental, toying with our perceptions of space, texture and structure" and their music as "the missing link between avante-garde ambient techno and noir-pop" meanwhile Lound And Quite says their music is "art pop with a soulful tint"

Next to their music project, Anton is working as a sound engineer and Fabian is currently doing DJ-Sets.

In April 2015, The/Das did a Boiler Room Session in Mexico.

== Band name ==
“We were looking for a name that could work like a blanc screen. One could say we were looking for a name with as little meaning as possible, so that with every track we produce the initial meaning would become more meaningful something indefinite to start with: no meaning yet, but some meaning in the future maybe“, stated band member Fabian in an interview.

The/Das, Live @ Utopia Island Festival 2015

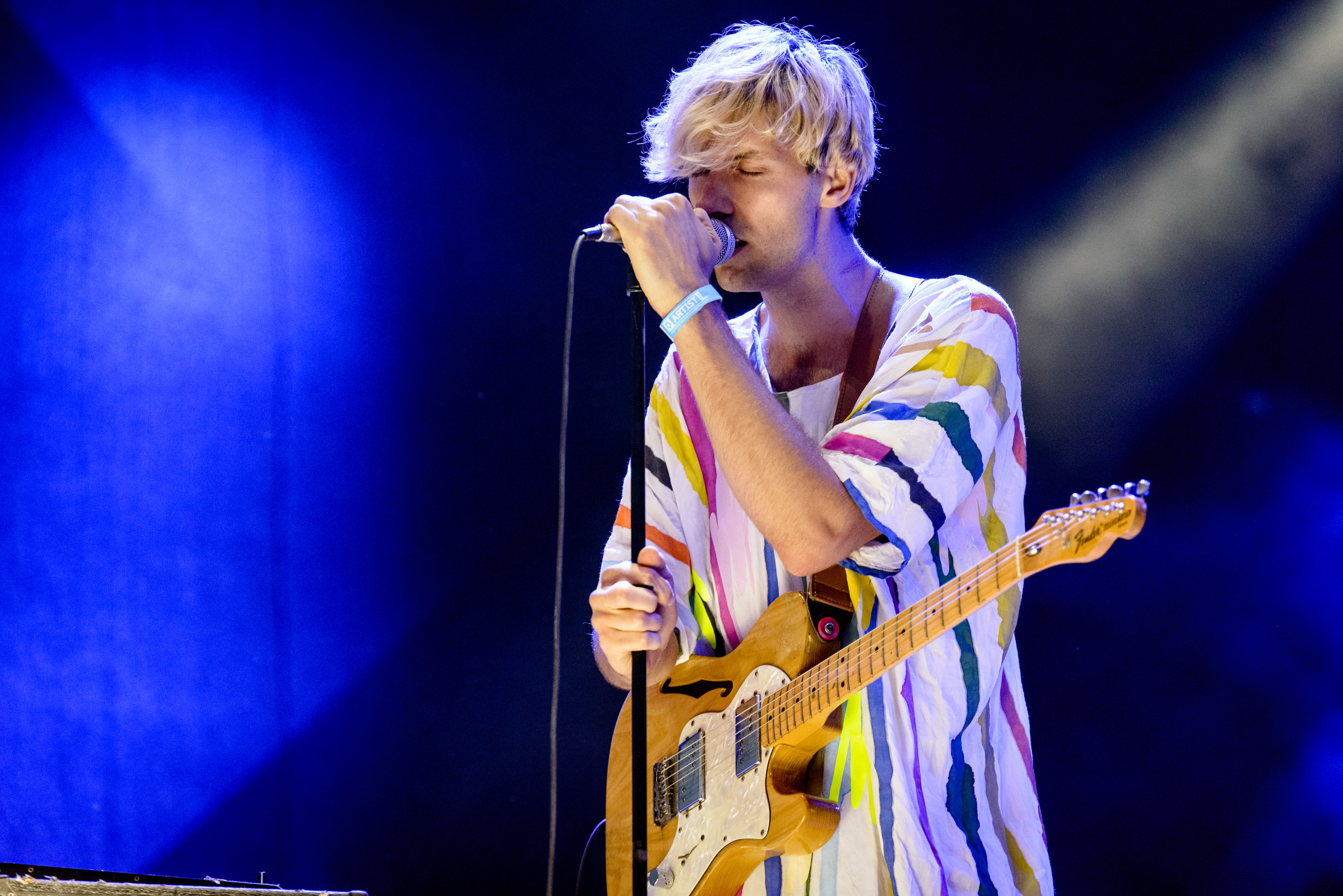
Fabian Fenk

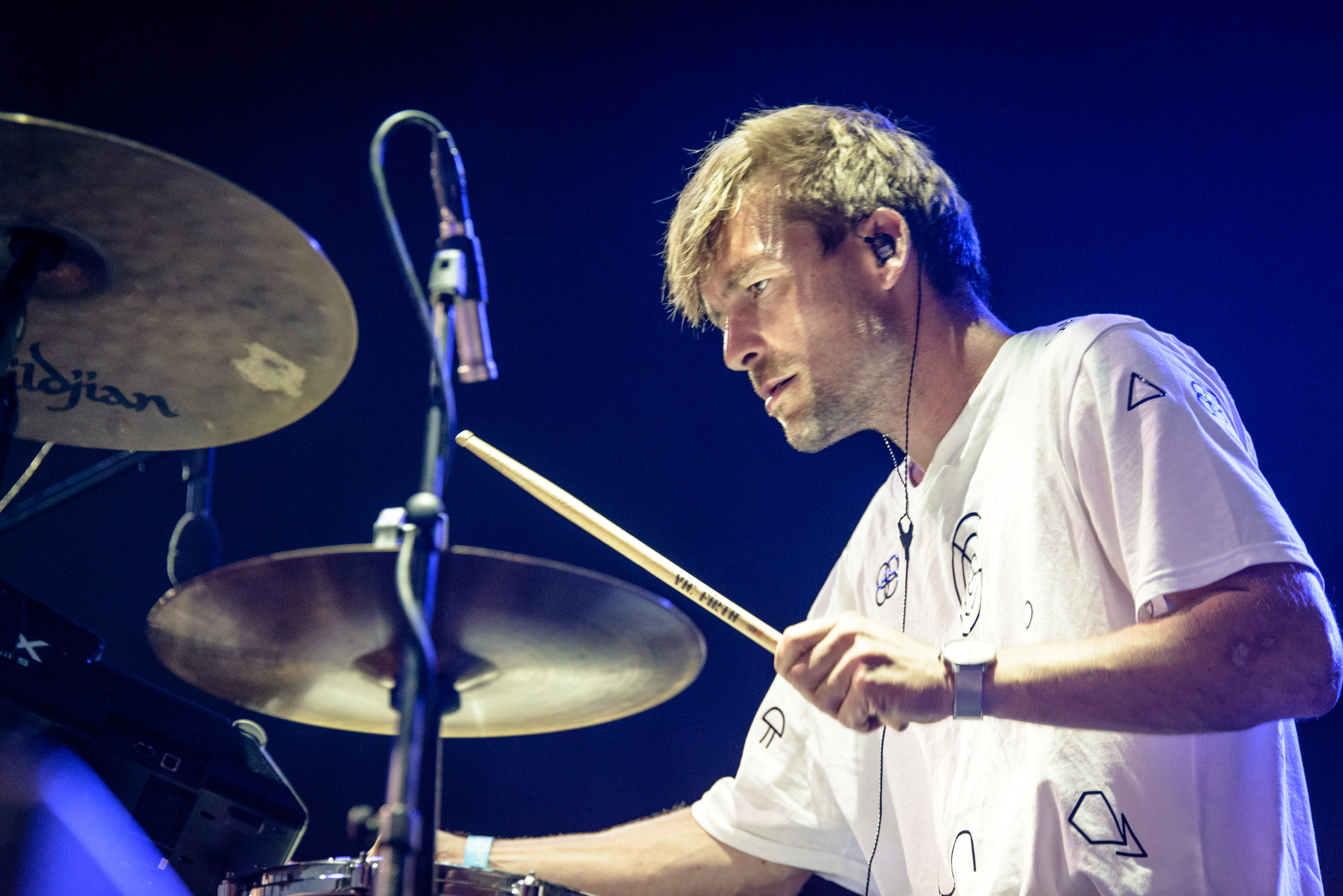
Jörg Wähner

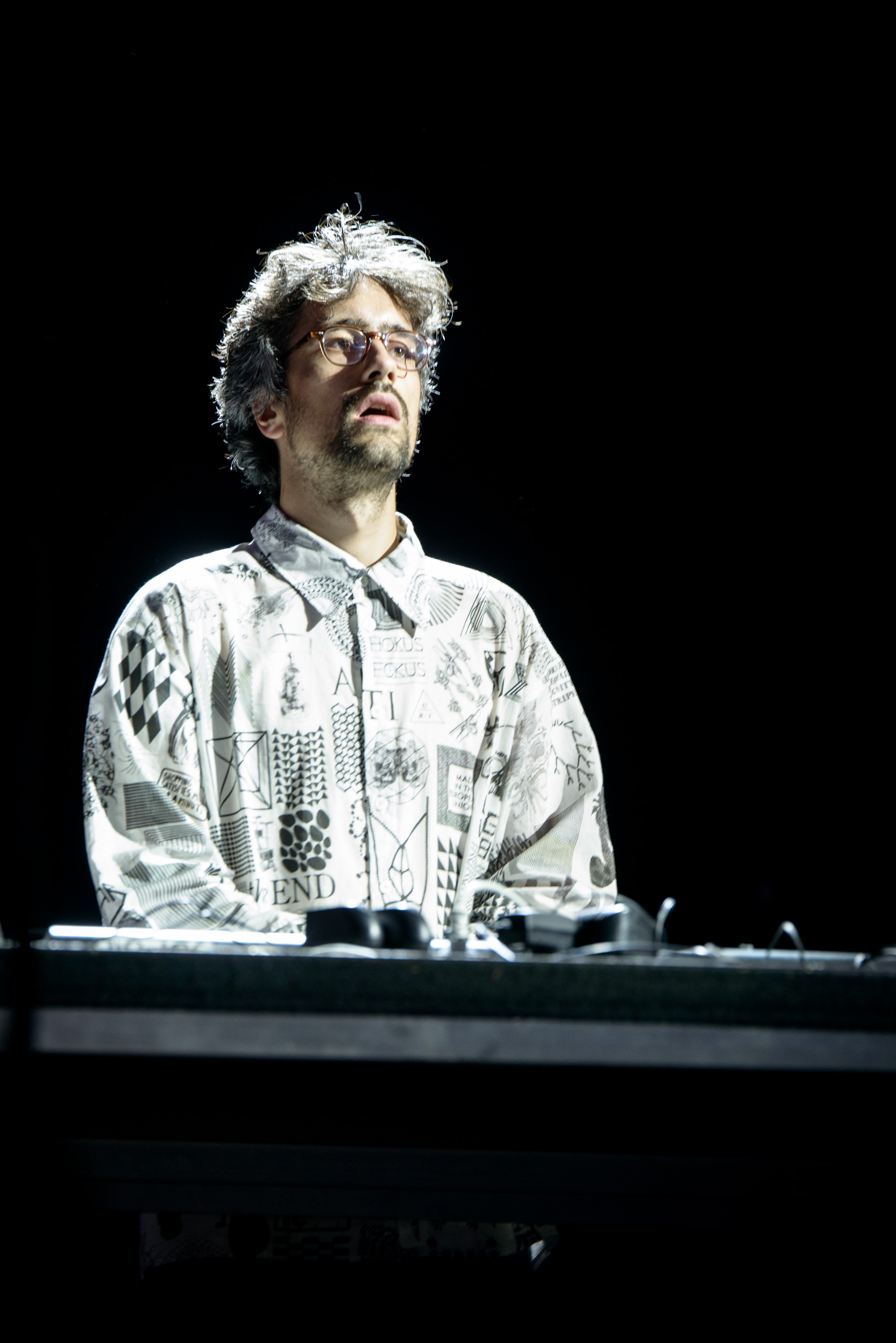
DJ Thomalla

== Albums ==
- 2014 – Freezer (LP, CD; Sinnbus)
- 2017 – Exit Strategies (LP)

== Singles and EPs ==
- 2012 – Tale Of Us & The/Das – Fresh Water EP (EP, Vinyl, Mp3; Life and Death)
- 2013 – "Speak Your Mind Speak" (CD, EP; Sinnbus)
- 2013 – "Outfashioned" (Vinyl, MP3; Life and Death)
- 2013 – "Have No Fear" (MP3, Single; Sinnbus)
- 2013 – "It's True" (MP3, Single; Sinnbus)
- 2014 – "My Made-Up Spook" (MP3, Single; Sinnbus)
