= Bodi Bill =

- Origin: Berlin, Germany
- Genres: Electronica, techno, art rock
- Years active: 2005-2011
- Labels: Sinnbus, Krakatau Records
- Members: Anton K. Feist; Fabian Fenk; Alex Stolze
- Website: www.bodibill.de

Bodi Bill [bɔdi bɪl] is an experimental electronica band, based in Berlin, Germany.

== History ==
The band was formed by Fabian Fenk, Anton K. Feist and Alex Stolze in 2005. Their style of music contains elements of techno, art-rock, glitch and folk.

No More Wars was the first album that got published in 2007 via the berlin-based independent label Sinnbus. Just one year after a new album Next Time was released.

The third album Two in One got international attention as it is said to "achieve […] something new to the table, an indie band that have been influenced by their musical surroundings. It just so happens that it’s German Techno and its many variations. It’s not club music. But it’s not meant to be, they have brought indie and electronic music together in a perfect balance."

What? was Bodi Bill's fourth album before they decided to take a break in 2011. After that, Alex Stolze formed, in collaboration with Mariechen Danz, Thomas Fietz and Mathias Geserick, the band UNMAP. Meanwhile, Anton K. Feist and Fabian Fenk chose to continue working as a duo under the name of The/Das.

== Reception ==
Stereogum vote the video to Brand New Carpet to the Video Of The Week in 2011. Bodi Bill made it as well in the Harder Blogger Faster's Top 20 Of 2010.

== Discography ==
=== Albums ===
- 2007: No More Wars (CD/LP, Sinnbus)
- 2008: Next Time (CD/LP, Sinnbus)
- 2010: Two In One (CD/LP, Sinnbus)
- 2011: What? (CD/LP, Sinnbus)
- 2022: I Love U I Do (CD/LP, Sinnbus)

=== Singles and EPs ===
- 2007: Willem EP (CD, Sinnbus)
- 2008: Tip Toe, I Like Holden Caulfield (CD, Sinnbus)
- 2008: Depart EP (CD, Sinnbus)
- 2010: I Like Holden Caulfield One Or Two (Remixes) EP (LP, Krakatau Records)
- 2010: Remixes (LP, Krakatau Records)
- 2010: I Like Holden Caulfield EP (CD, Sinnbus)
- 2011: What? - EP (CD, Sinnbus)
- 2011: Pyramiding (Edit) (Sinnbus)
- 2011: Hotel - Single (Sinnbus)
- 2011: Brand New Carpet - Single (Sinnbus)
- 2012: What Remixes (LP, Krakatau Records)

=== Remixes ===
Bodi Bill's single What? had been remixed by Thomalla and Apparat. In order to celebrate the release of their What? album, Siriusmo, a supporter and friend of Bodi Bill, did a remix of I like Holden Caufield which had been a track of the earlier Two in One EP. Siriusmo also remixed Tip Toe Walk.
