= Men Among Animals =

- Origin: Denmark
- Genres: Eksperimental / pop
- Years active: 2006 - present
- Label: Tapete Records

Men Among Animals is an experimental/pop group from Denmark. They are signed to German record label Tapete Records and known in Denmark for their energetic concerts. They have supported big acts like The Ruby Suns, Of Montreal, Dean & Britta and Apparat (musician).

== Biography ==
The five piece took their name Men Among Animals in 2006 after having played in a zoo in Montreal (Canada). Members of the band stated in an interview with Danish national paper Politiken that the only audience present at their concert in Montreal zoo was the animals living there. Afterwards they thought it natural to take the name Men Among Animals. Men Among Animals released their debut album Bad Times, All Gone in autumn 2007 through Tapete Records.

The band has claimed in an interview with national radio that they want to change pop music in Denmark. They were number one on the national radio chart - Det Elektriske Barometer - for four weeks. And second most voted for in all of 2008 Men Among Animals' second album Run Ego was produced and mixed by band member Bo Christensen in collaboration with producer Quentin Stoltzfus of Philadelphia group Mazarin.

Men Among Animals' second album is titled Run Ego and is to be released March 12, 2010.

== Discography ==
=== Albums ===
- Bad Times, All Gone CD/Vinyl (2007) Tapete Records
- Run Ego CD/Vinyl (March 12, 2010) Tapete Records

=== Singles ===
- Cavaliers (a-side) / Waltzing with Luke (b-side) 7# single (2007) Tapete Records
