= Temples (band) =

English rock band

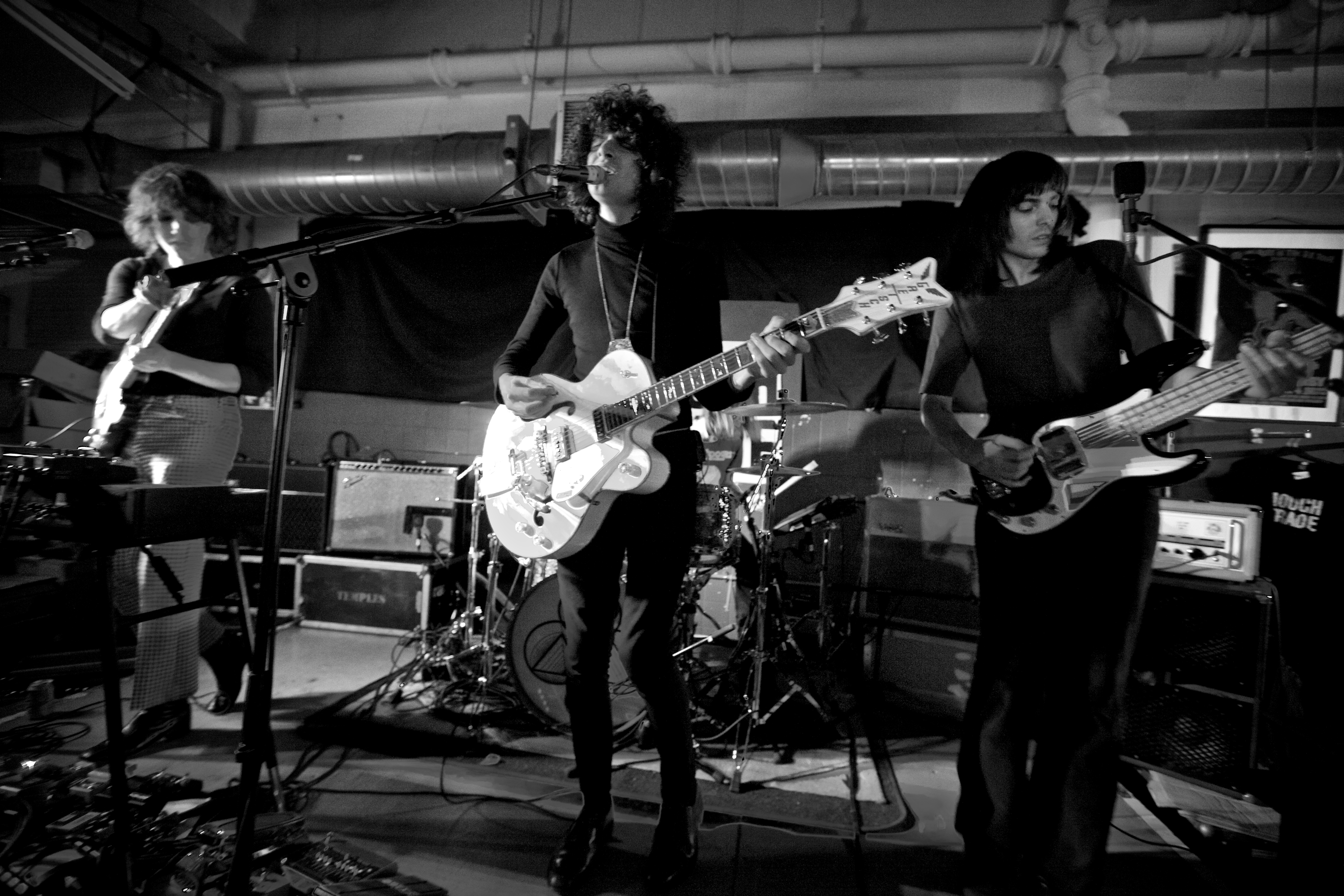
- Temples in 2014

Background information
- Origin: Kettering, England
- Genres: Psychedelic rock; neo-psychedelia; psychedelic pop; alternative rock
- Years active: 2012–present
- Labels: ATO; Fat Possum; Heavenly
- Members: James Bagshaw; Tom Walmsley; Adam Smith; Rens Ottink
- Past members: Jack Prince; Sam Toms
- Website: www.templestheband.com

Temples are an English rock band, formed in Kettering, England in 2012 by singer and guitarist James Bagshaw and bassist Tom Walmsley. The band's lineup was later completed with the addition of keyboardist and rhythm guitarist Adam Smith and drummer Rens Ottink.

They have released four studio albums, two EPs, and a number of singles. Their debut album, Sun Structures, was released in 2014 and charted at number seven in the UK. They are signed to ATO Records and have toured internationally both as a support act and as the headliner.

== History ==
The band was initially formed as a home studio project in mid 2012. Walmsley and Bagshaw had known each other for years before these projects. It was at this point that they were in rival bands based in their hometown of Kettering. The duo had later worked together in The Moons, with Bagshaw also having sessioned with the Lightning Seeds and co-fronted another earlier Kettering band Sukie who formed in 2006 and charted at No 1 in the UK Indie Chart with their debut single "Pink-A-Pade". Sukie were featured in the fanzine "Siren", edited and created by Walmsley to document Kettering's music scene.

The duo uploaded four self-produced tracks to YouTube, which caught the attention of Heavenly Recordings founder Jeff Barrett, who agreed to release the band's debut single "Shelter Song" in November 2012. They then enlisted fellow Kettering resident drummer, Samuel Lloyd Toms (Secret Fix, ex-Koolaid Electric Company) and keyboard player Adam Smith and started rehearsing as a band, so they could play their songs live, having never played live as a band before. The band released their second single "Colours To Life" in June 2013.

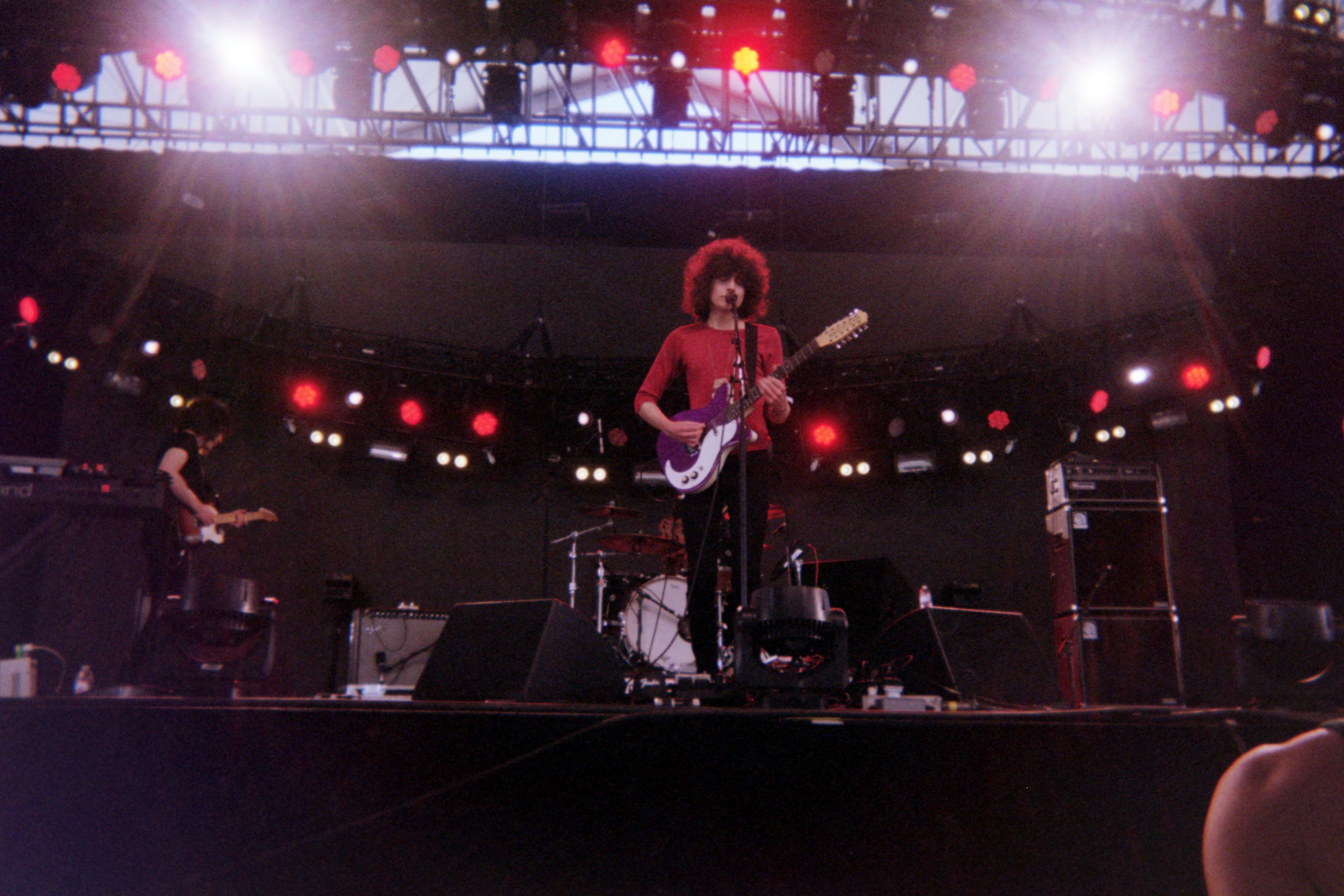
Temples performing at Coachella in 2014

In an interview with Sound of Boston, lead vocalist James Bagshaw noted that signing on to Heavenly Records did not change their recording process. "Nothing changed, everything stayed exactly the same... At no point did they say, you know, go into the studio. If they did, we probably wouldn’t have signed to them because we liked the idea of what we were doing," Bagshaw stated. Temples' personal gear during recording comes from various gear from Vox and Orange Amps, along with synthesizers like the Roland VK-8 Combo Organ.

Bagshaw also commented on the difficulty in selecting which tracks to release as singles. The melodic nature of "Mesmerise" was a main reason why Temples chose to release it as a single; "I guess melody is something that assigns a single because that’s the thing that people listen to. But for us, we always found it very hard to choose singles… it might not be commercially viable, but that one sounds more catchy," said Bagshaw.

Having played major UK and European festival and supported the likes of Suede, Mystery Jets, Kasabian and The Vaccines alongside select headline dates, the band announced their first headline UK tour to take place in October 2013. In November 2013, Temples announced their self-produced debut album, Sun Structures, which was released on 5 February 2014. The band embarked on a headlining tour around Europe, North America, and Australia. On 30 July 2014, the band performed for the first time on US television performing "Shelter Song" on The Tonight Show Starring Jimmy Fallon. Temples also performed "Shelter Song" on The Ellen Degeneres Show on 29 September 2014.

On 30 September 2014, their song “Mesmerise” was featured in the Forza Horizon 2 soundtrack.

The band's relative lack of airplay on major radio stations in the UK, especially BBC Radio 1, has been criticized by fellow musician and fan Noel Gallagher.

They debuted two new songs live in 2015, entitled 'Henry's Cake' and 'Volcano/Savior' respectively. The band confirmed that they were working on a new album via Instagram on 9 July 2015. The band spent much of the first half of 2016 recording new material before embarking on a number of European festival dates. On 26 September 2016 the band announced a new single, "Certainty".

The band released their second studio album, Volcano, on 3 March 2017.

In early 2018, drummer Samuel Toms left the band to concentrate on his solo project Secret Fix, and has gone on to join Fat White Family. The band have made no announcement regarding Toms' departure, with Toms himself only confirming his departure in December 2018 months after the band had toured with PAUW drummer Rens Ottink and released press shots with just the other three band members. Toms acknowledged that fans were contacting him regarding his departure from the band, as the band had made no comment. Toms admitted that he was asked to leave the band for reasons he did not wish to divulge, but also claimed that he had been thinking of leaving the band since shortly after joining the band, as he was not able nor allowed to contribute musically. The band also parted ways with Heavenly Recordings in 2018.

Temples' third studio album, Hot Motion, was released by ATO Records on 3 September 2019. Their fourth album, Exotico, was released on 14 April 2023. Their fifth album, Bliss, released on 26 June 2026.

== Band members ==
Current

- James Edward Bagshaw – lead vocals, lead guitar
- Adam Thomas Smith – rhythm guitar, keyboards, backing vocals
- Thomas Edward James Walmsley – bass guitar, backing vocals
- Rens Ottink – drums

Former

- Samuel Toms – drums
- Jack Prince – drums

== Discography ==
=== Studio albums ===
- Sun Structures (5 February 2014) UK No. 7
- Volcano (3 March 2017) UK No. 23
- Hot Motion (27 September 2019) UK No. 51
- Exotico (14 April 2023)
- Bliss (26 June 2026)

=== Remix album ===
- Sun Restructured (10 November 2014)

=== EPs ===
- Shelter Song EP (7 July 2014)
- Mesmerise Live EP (16 September 2014)
- Other Structures EP (4 October 2024)

=== Singles ===
- "Shelter Song" / "Prisms" (12 November 2012)
- "Colours to Life" / "Ankh" (24 June 2013)
- "Keep In the Dark" / "Jewel of Mine Eye" (7 October 2013)
- "Mesmerise" (20 November 2013)
- "Move with the Season" (3 November 2014)
- "Certainty" (26 September 2016)
- "Strange or Be Forgotten" (10 January 2017)
- "Hot Motion" (2019)
- "You're Either On Something" (2019)
- "Paraphernalia" (2 September 2020)
- "Gamma Rays" (11 January 2023)
- "Cicada" (14 February 2023)
- "Afterlife" (14 March 2023)
- "Jet Stream Heart" (20 February 2026)
