= Oliver Gottwald =

German singer and guitarist

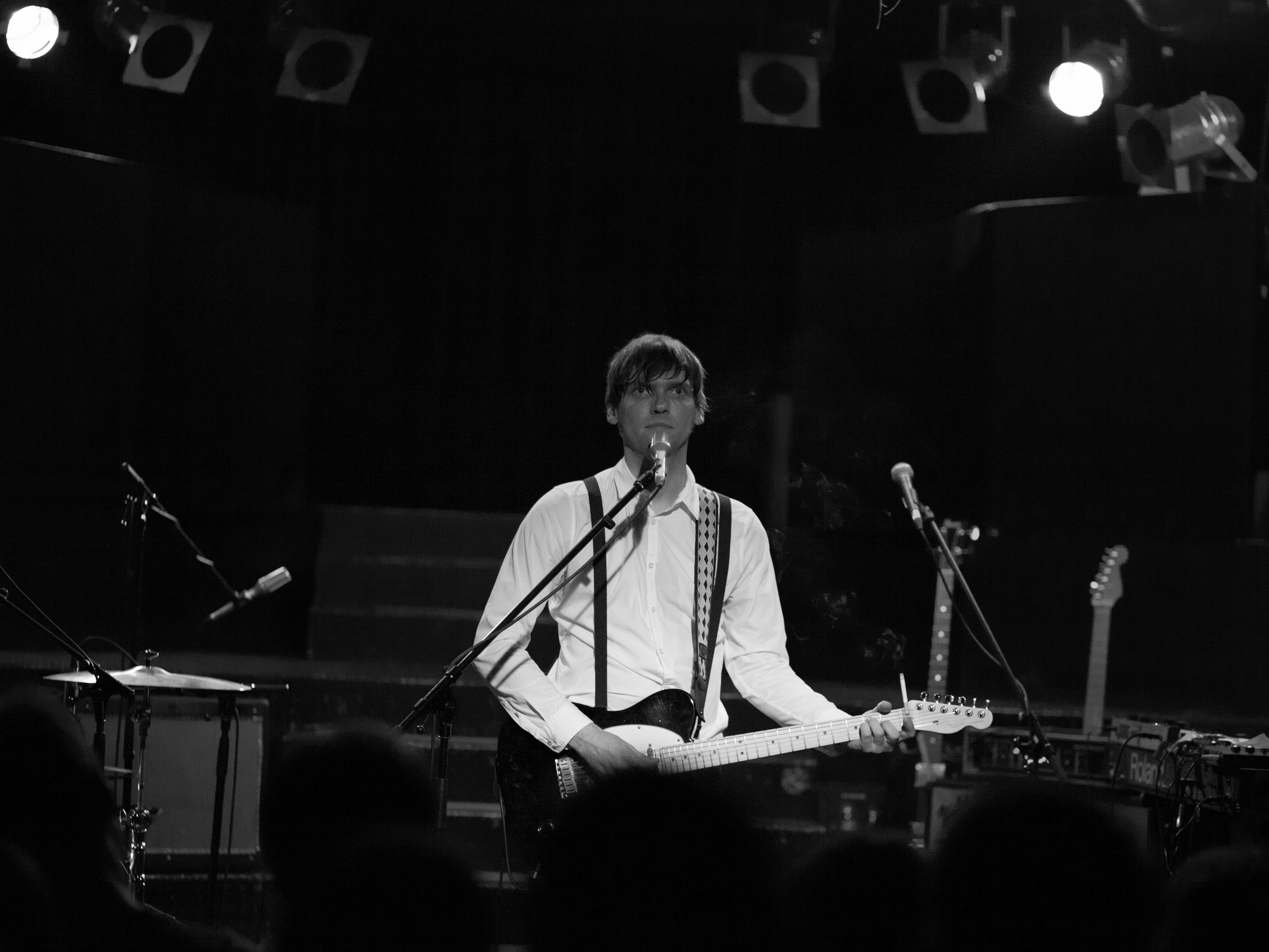
Oliver Gottwald

Oliver Gottwald (born 27 September 1978) is a German singer, guitarist and songwriter. He was the frontman of Anajo, but is now pursuing a solo career.

== Life ==
Oliver Gottwald grew up in Schwabmünchen near Augsburg. In 2000 he and his band Anajo won the Augsburg young talent competition "Band of the Year". He signed a contract with the music publisher Warner/Chappell and the band released several EPs. In 2004 the Hamburg indie label Tapete Records signed the band. There they released four albums.

In the autumn of 2014, the band announced that they would "go their separate ways". Oliver Gottwald then worked on a solo album that also appeared on Tapete Records in February 2015 under the title 'Zurück als Tourist'.

In late 2016 he founded his own label with his partner called Lieblingslieder Records, on which the singles Mustangmann, Stadt Land Fluss and Halluzinationen have already been published. All three songs are part of the EP Lieblingslieder. Gottwald has also recently started working with a new permanent band, consisting of Samuel Heinecker (keyboard), Fabian Schlegel (drums) and Ralph Stachulla (bass).

The single Stadt Land Fluss is the title song of the eight-part youth series "Stadt, Land, Bus" on KiKA, which was first broadcast in November 2017.

In addition to his own music career, He was part of the juries of the "Newcomer Contest Bayern" and the "John Lennon Talent Award" several times.

On 12 March 2018 the rapper Errdeka released the album "Solo", on which the song "Funkeln feat. Oliver Gottwald" can be found.

Oliver Gottwald was nominated for the Augsburg Media Prize 2018 in the category Sound.

== Discography ==
=== Solo ===
==== Albums ====
- 2022: 2. OG (Lieblingslieder Records)
- 2015: Zurück als Tourist (Tapete Records / Indigo)
- 2017: Lieblingslieder (Lieblingslieder Records / Believe)

==== Singles ====
- 2014: Freunde fürs Leben (Tapete Records / Indigo)
- 2016: Mustangmann (Lieblingslieder Records / Believe)
- 2017: Stadt Land Fluss (Lieblingslieder Records / Believe)
- 2017: Halluzinationen (Lieblingslieder Records / Believe)
- 2019: Zukunftsmusik (Lieblingslieder Records / Believe)
