= Live:Cambridge =

- Live:Cambridge

Live album by Ezio
- Released: 2005
- Recorded: 2005
- Genre: Folk
- Length: 78.0 minutes
- Language: English
- Label: Salami Records
- Producer: Ezio Lunedei

Ezio chronology
The Making of Mr. Spoons (2003)	Live:Cambridge (2005)	Ten Thousand Bars (2006)

Live:Cambridge is the seventh album, and the second live album, by Ezio, released in 2005.

== Track listing ==
All songs written by Ezio Lunedei except 59 yards, written by Boo Hewerdine.

1. "Perfect" – 4:42
2. "Thin line" – 4:07
3. "Mermaid song" – 4:48
4. "The girl of my dreams" – 1:38
5. "59 yards" – 5:10
6. "Braver than you are" – 4:49
7. "Darkness" – 7:05
8. "Wild side / Moon" – 9:05
9. "All for you" – 3:46
10. "Moonburn" – 6:23
11. "Thousand years" – 5:08
12. "Deeper" – 5:45
13. "Saxon Street" – 17:16
