= Location (EP) =

Location EP

EP by The Grand Opening
- Released: 2005
- Recorded: 2005
- Genre: Alternative rock, slowcore
- Label: It's a Trap!
- Producer: John Roger Olsson

The Grand Opening chronology
| Location EP (2005) | This Is Nowhere to Be Found (2006) |

Location EP is the debut EP recording by Swedish band The Grand Opening. It was digitally released on the American label It's a Trap!.

== Track listing ==
| No. | Title | Length |
|---|---|---|
| 1. | "Don't Drop Off" | 3:57 |
| 2. | "Get Out" | 5:19 |
| 3. | "Location" | 4:12 |
| 4. | "Darkness Saves Us" | 2:58 |
| 5. | "Hope Floats" | 2:38 |

== Personnel ==
- John Roger Olsson: vocals, guitar
- Jens Pettersson: drums
- Joakim Labraaten: Fender Rhodes piano
- Johanna Ojala: backing vocals
- Maria Stensdotter: backing vocals
