= The Angel Song (album) =

- The Angel Song

Studio album by Ezio
- Released: 1993
- Recorded: 1993
- Genre: Folk
- Length: 50.7 minutes
- Language: English
- Label: Salami Records
- Producer: Ezio Lunedei

Ezio chronology
The Angel Song (1993)	Black Boots on Latin Feet (1995)

The Angel Song is the debut album by Ezio, released in 1993. The album, named after the closing song, was self-released by the band and the proceeds from sales of the album at gigs were used to fund further touring.

== Track listing ==
All songs written by Ezio Lunedei except as indicated.

1. "Moonstruck" – 4:21 (Music by Ezio, lyrics by Ezio and Paul Howard)
2. "Cinderella" – 5:35
3. "Immigrants table" – 3:15
4. "Thousand years" – 3:45
5. "Go" – 5:13
6. "If you want" – 3:49
7. "Circus" – 4:13
8. "Steal away" – 3:45
9. "Francesca's grown up" – 5:02
10. "Agony" – 2:49
11. "Just because you're near" – 3:43
12. "The Angel song" – 5:14

== Credits ==
- Ezio – guitar, vocals
- Booga – guitar
- Mark Gillespie – bass
- Richard Beasley – drums
- Martin Randle – keyboards

== Production ==
- Producer: Ezio
- Engineering: Mark Gillespie and Steve Bottomley
- Cover illustration: Giovanna Pierce
- Sleeve design: Nick
