= Barra Head (band) =

Danish rock band

- Origin: Copenhagen, Denmark
- Genres: Indie rock, math rock, punk rock, post-hardcore
- Years active: 1992–present
- Label: Play/Rec
- Members: Arvid Gregersen; Jakob Aron Hvitnov; Mikkel Jes Hansen

Barra Head is a rock trio from Copenhagen, Denmark. Founded in 1992, the band has never changed its members. Barra Head belong to the genres indie-rock, punk rock, post-hardcore and math rock. Their biggest influences are Karate, Fugazi and Faraquet. Very well known in the Danish and German underground scene, the band has toured Europe extensively and played at the Roskilde Festival in Denmark in 2001 and 2006. Furthermore, they have received the “Live Act of the Year” Award at the venue Club Vera in Groningen, the Netherlands two years in a row (2004 and 2005).

== Band members ==
- Arvid Gregersen (Bass)
- Mikkel Jes Hansen (Guitar and Vocals)
- Jakob Hvitnov (Drums)

== Discography ==
- 2001 Songs and Departures (CD, LP; labels: Play/Rec, Scenepolice)
- 2001 Play/Rec #01 (compilation CD; label: Play/Rec)
- 2001 FFAR Compilation (compilation CD; label: Zerobros)
- 2004 Arrival (CD/12" EP; labels: Play/Rec, Noisedeluxe, Broken Silence)
- 2004 We Are Your Numbers (CD, LP; labels: Play/Rec, Sinnbusrecords, Alive, Zabel, Konkurrent)
- 2006 "Undermine/Gradiska" (7" single; labels: Play/Rec)
- 2006 Play/Rec Five Years (compilation CD; label: Play/Rec)
- 2008 Go Get Beat Up (CD, LP; label: Play/Rec)
