= Me and My Drummer =

German indie pop band

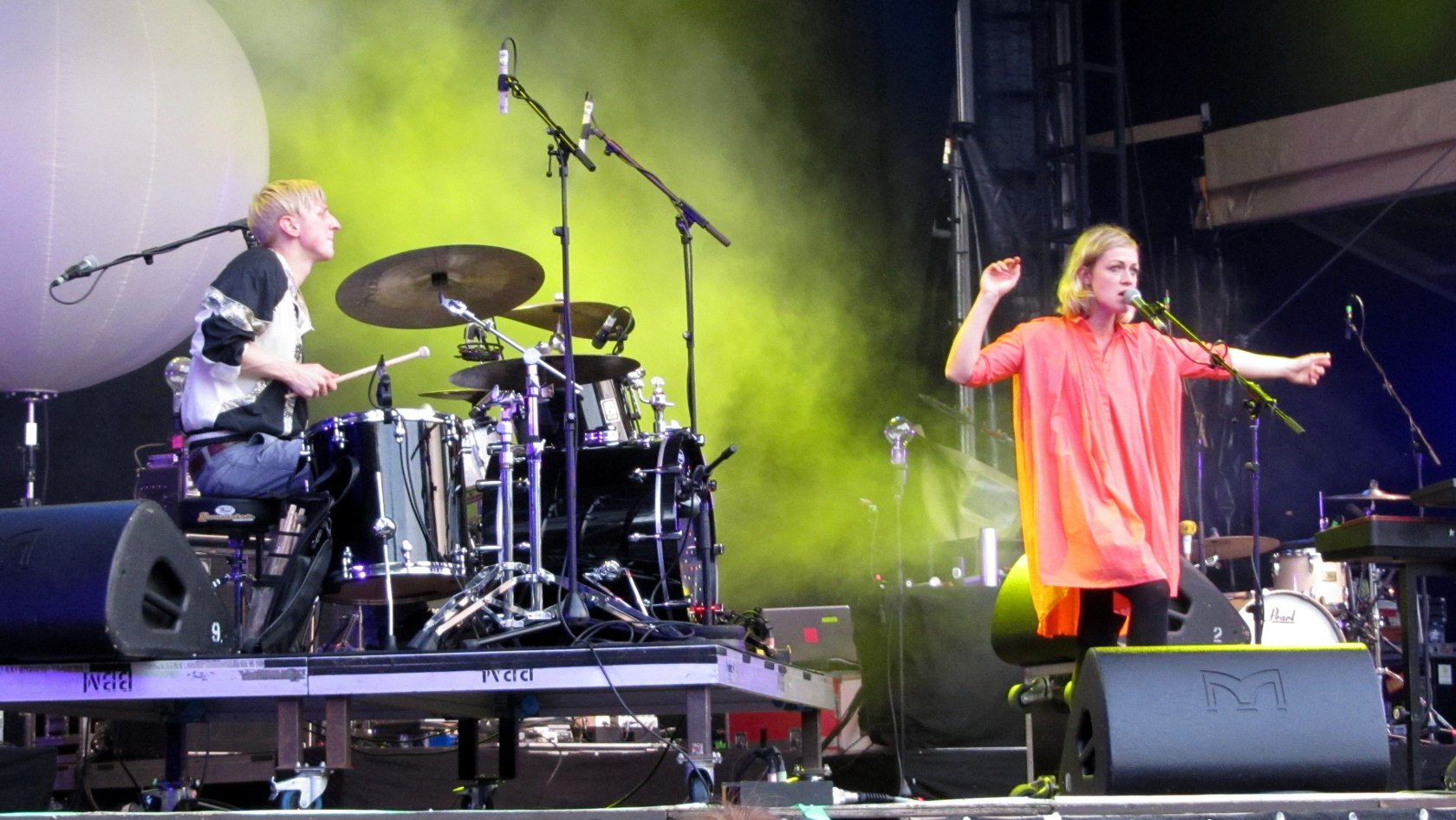

Background information
- Genres: Indie pop, dream pop
- Years active: 2011–2018
- Labels: Sinnbus
- Members: Charlotte Brandi; Matze Pröllochs

Me and My Drummer were an indie pop duo from Berlin.

Charlotte Brandi and Matze Pröllochs met in Tübingen, Germany. Both worked in a theatre as stage musicians and their musical inspirations brought them together.

In 2011 they began to record their debut The Hawk, The Beak, The Prey at Radio Buellebrueck Studio by Tobias Siebert. It was released in 2012 by Sinnbus.

The band's second album Love Is a Fridge was released in February 2016.

== Discography ==
=== Albums ===
- The Hawk, The Beak, The Prey (2012)
- Love Is a Fridge (2016)

=== Singles ===
- "You're a Runner" (2012)
- "Heavy Weight" (2012)
- "Don't Be So Hot" (2012)
- "Blue Splinter View" (2015)
- "Pentonville Road" (2016)
- "Gun" (2016)
- "Bloodmoon" (2017)
