= Klee (band) =

German pop band

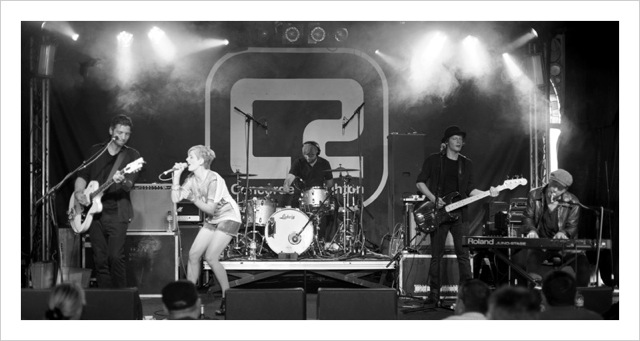
- Klee performing in 2010 in Brighton, England

Background information
- Origin: Cologne, Germany
- Genres: Rock
- Years active: 2002–present
- Labels: modernsoul (Ministry of Sound), Island (Universal), Warner Music
- Members: Suzie Kerstgens; Sten Servaes
- Past members: Tom Deininger
- Website: www.kleemusik.de (in German)

Klee (German for "clover") is a German pop band from Cologne. Named after German painter Paul Klee, the band was formed in 2002 by singer Suzie Kerstgens and musicians Sten Servaes and Tom Deininger. Klee's brand of pop music incorporates electronic as well as acoustic sounds and, in more recent years, the band has embraced chanson and schlager. Four of Klee's albums have entered the top 30 of the German albums chart.

== History ==
During the nineties, Tom Deininger, Sten Servaes and Suzie Kerstgens were members of German band Ralley and recorded the albums Ralley (1997) and 1, 2, 3, 4 (1999). A serious traffic accident in 1999 forced them to take a three-year break so that Deininger and Servaes could fully cover from their injuries. The trio then reformed in 2002 as the band Klee. According to Kerstgens, the new band name was inspired by the work of German painter Paul Klee, and also hints at the four-leaf clover as a good luck symbol. With the change in band name, there was also a change in style from guitar pop to electropop.

In 2002, the single "Erinner dich" (Remember) from Klee's debut album, Unverwundbar (Invulnerable), was released. The single was in the top 100 of the German singles chart for one week at No. 94.

In July 2004, Klee's second album, Jelängerjelieber (The longer the better), was released. The first single from it, "2 Fragen" (2 questions), brought the band to the attention of German radio and television stations. In November 2004, Klee gained further exposure by performing "Gold", another single from the album, on television show Sarah Kuttner – Die Show on MTV Germany. The band then represented the German state of Saarland in the Bundesvision Song Contest 2005 with "Gold", finishing in 10th place with 37 points. "Gold" stayed in the German singles chart for nine weeks, where it reached number 54.

An American version of Jelängerjelieber titled Honeysuckle was released in July 2006 by US record label Minty Fresh. For this album, three songs were re-recorded in English: "Für alle, die", "Tausendfach" and "Gold", the respective official English titles being “This Is for Everyone”, “A Thousand Ways” and “Gold”.

Klee's third album, Zwischen Himmel und Erde (Between heaven and earth), came out in August 2006 and became the band's first top 20 album in Germany, peaking at No. 17. One song from the album, "Die Stadt" (The city), was released earlier in July 2006 as a single and reached No. 55 in the German charts. Zwischen Himmel und Erde continued the trend started in Jelängerjelieber of Klee’s music becoming less reliant on electronic sounds and giving more prominence to guitar sounds.

In July 2008, Klee released the single "Zwei Herzen" (Two hearts), which became the band's first German top 30 single, peaking at No. 29. The single came from Klee's fourth album, Berge versetzen (Moving mountains), which was released in August 2008 and went to No. 15 in the German albums chart. The second single from the album, the title song "Berge versetzen", was released later in 2008 and reached No. 57 in the German singles chart.

In 2010, Deininger parted company with Kerstgens and Servaes, leaving the duo to record Klee’s fifth album, Aus lauter Liebe (Out of sheer love). Released in August 2011, the album was the band’s most successful to date, peaking at No. 6 in the German albums chart. One single released from the album, "Willst du bei mir bleiben" (Do you want to stay with me), reached No. 29 in the German singles chart. Aus lauter Liebe shows a further development in Klee's sound, with several songs having hints of chanson.

Klee's sixth album, Hello Again, was released in August 2015, featuring bossa nova-influenced cover versions of schlager songs, such as "Hello Again" by Howard Carpendale and "Du bist nicht allein" by Roy Black. The idea of doing the album came about by chance during the recording of Klee's next studio album, which is due to be released in 2016. Hello Again charted at No. 23 in the German albums chart.

== Live performances ==
Klee frequently performs live, giving up to 150 concerts each year. The band’s appearances ranged from performances at small venues to opening for established bands such as The Wedding Present and Nena. Outside Germany, Klee has performed in London and Amsterdam, and also in Turkey, Russia and China following invitations from the Goethe-Institut. For live performances, additional musicians including drummer, bassist and guitarist are added to Klee’s lineup and the band adopts a greater "rock sound" than in its studio recordings.

== Musical style ==
Deininger described Klee's musical style in a 2009 interview: "We make international pop music that has its roots in the eighties. It can be more minimalistic and electronic, as on the debut album Unverwundbar, or it can be more acoustic and on a grander scale, as on the third album Zwischen Himmel und Erde." ("Wir produzieren internationale Popmusik, die ihre Wurzeln in den Achtzigern hat. Mal minimalistischer und elektronischer, wie auf dem ersten Album, Unverwundbar´, mal akustischer und größer, wie auf dem dritten Album, Zwischen Himmel und Erde'.")

In its biography of Klee, online music magazine laut.de called the band the great romantics of German pop ("die großen Romantiker des deutschen Pop") and described the band's music as a harmonious marriage of synthesizer sounds, forceful drums and British-style electric guitars ("Synthie-Sounds, druckvolles Schlagzeug und britisch angehauchte E-Gitarren gehen eine harmonische Ehe ein"). The magazine also noted the contribution by Kerstgens' unique, softly breathing and velvety voice ("veredelt von Suzie Kerstgens einzigartiger, weich hauchender und samtenen Stimme").

Various journalists have noticed the British pop influences in Klee's music. In its review of the album Jelängerjelieber, music website plattentests.de found such influences in the songs "Gold" (New Order), "Unser Film" (The Cure) and "Wunschfrei" (Coldplay).

=== Lyrics ===
Klee's lyrics are written by Kerstgens, while the other band members provide the music. The band also has a long-time working relationship with German songwriter Tom Liwa. Songs are produced in the band's own studio in Cologne.

Klee's lyrics refer to deeply felt moments in human relationships. Klee's lyrics straddle the material world and a dream world in which desires and conflicts intermingle.

In a 2012 interview, Kerstgens stated: "I completely open up my heart in our songs. Everything in Klee is autobiographical, personally experienced and personally suffered." ("Ich offenbare in unseren Songs komplett mein Herz. Bei Klee ist alles autobiografisch, selbst erlebt und selbst erlitten.")

== Band members ==
Current members

- Suzie Kerstgens – lead vocals (2002–present)
- Sten Servaes – piano, keyboards, vocals (2002–present)

Former members

- Tom Deininger – guitar, bass (2002–2010)

Additional members for live performances

- Stefan "Pele" Götzer – bass (also credited as band member on the albums Zwischen Himmel und Erde and Berge versetzen)
- Daniel Klingen – drums (also credited as band member on the albums Zwischen Himmel und Erde and Berge versetzen)
- Andreas "Pese" Puscher – guitar
- Boris Rogowski – guitar
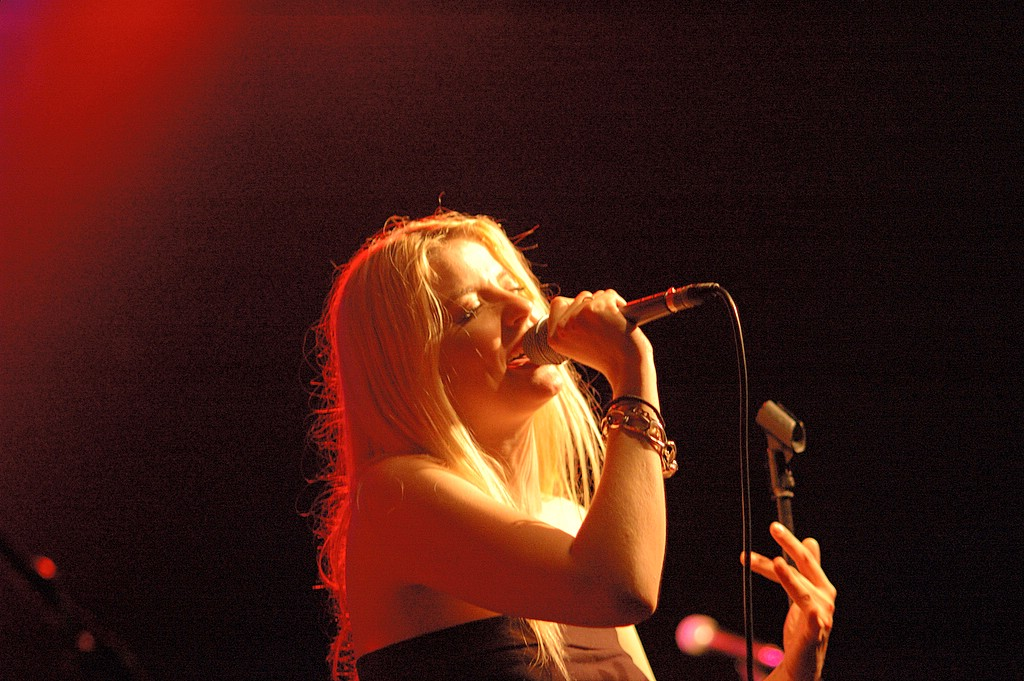
Suzie Kerstgens

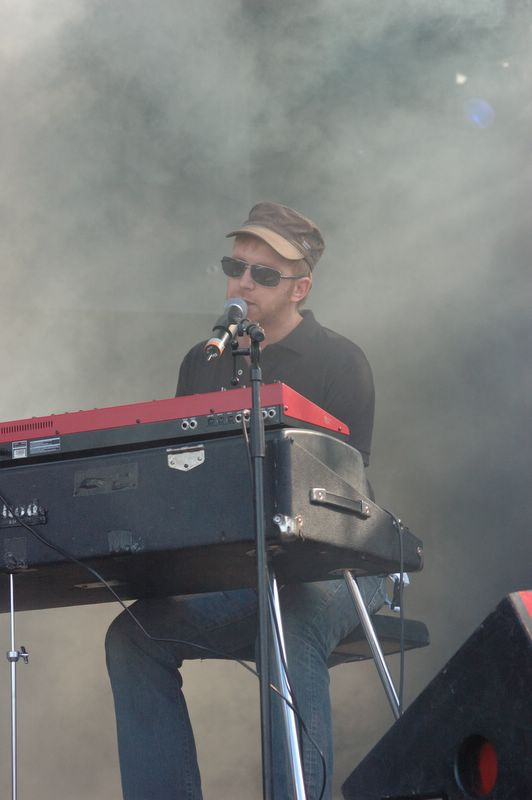
Sten Servaes

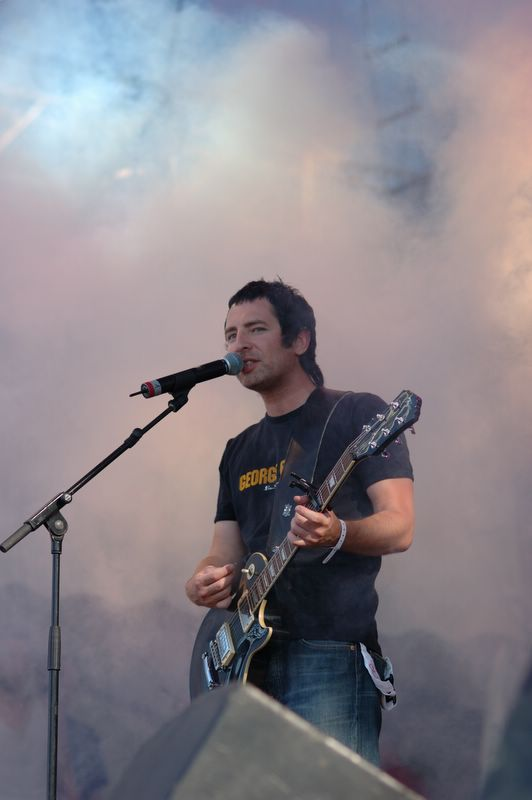
Tom Deininger

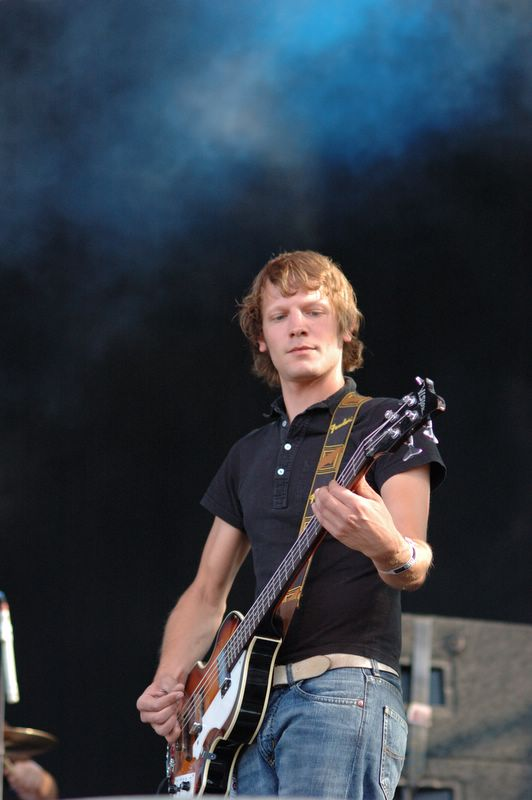
Stefan "Pele" Götzer

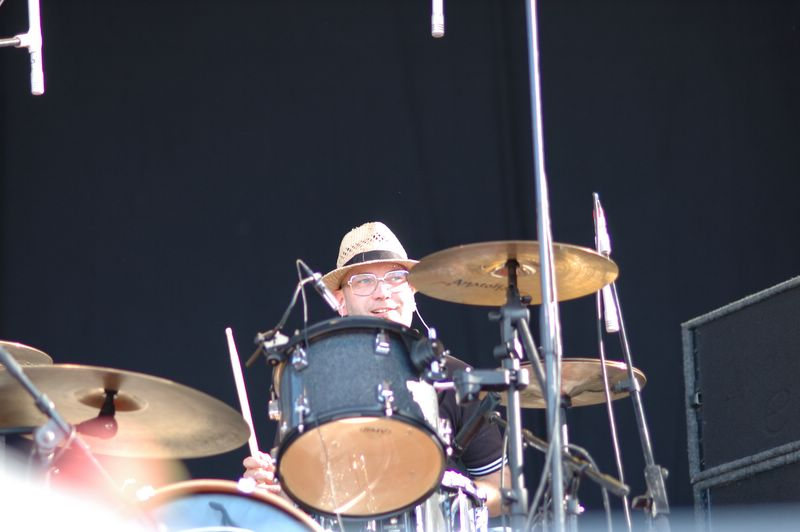
Daniel Klingen

== Discography ==
=== Albums ===
Title	Album details	Peak chart positions		
Title	Album details	GER	AUT	SWI
Unverwundbar	Released: 23 July 2003; Label: modernsoul (Ministry of Sound); Formats: CD, digital download	—	—	—
Jelängerjelieber^{[I]}	Released: 23 July 2004; Label: modernsoul (Ministry of Sound); Formats: CD, digital download	75	—	—
Zwischen Himmel und Erde^{[II]}	Released: 4 August 2006; Label: modernsoul (Ministry of Sound); Formats: CD, digital download	17	68	—
Berge versetzen^{[III]}	Released: 1 August 2008; Label: Island (Universal Musical Group); Formats: CD, digital download	15	72	—
Aus lauter Liebe^{[IV]}	Released: 26 August 2011; Label: Island (Universal Musical Group); Formats: CD, digital download	6	—	—
Hello Again	Released: 14 August 2015; Label: Warner Music Germany; Formats: CD, digital download	23	67	—
Trotzalledem	Released: 30 April 2021; Label: Warner Music Germany; Formats: CD, digital download	26	—	—
"—" denotes a recording that did not chart or was not released in that territory.

- I Jelängerjelieber was also released as a tour edition with bonus live CD. In the USA, Jelängerjelieber was released by record label Minty Fresh as Honeysuckle (2006) with three songs re-recorded in English.
- II Zwischen Himmel und Erde was also released as a deluxe edition with bonus DVD.
- III Berge versetzen was also released as a deluxe edition with bonus DVD.
- IV Aus lauter Liebe was also released as a deluxe edition with bonus DVD.

=== Singles ===
Title	Year	Peak chart positions			Album
Title	Year	GER	AUT	SWI	Album
"Erinner dich"	2002	94	—	—	Unverwundbar
"Lichtstrahl"	2003	—	—	—	Unverwundbar
"Nicht immer aber jetzt"	2003	—	—	—	Unverwundbar
"2 Fragen"	2004	—	—	—	Jelängerjelieber
"Gold"	2005	54	—	—	Jelängerjelieber
"Tausendfach"	2005	85	—	—	Jelängerjelieber
"Für alle, die"	2005	—	—	—	Jelängerjelieber
"Die Stadt"	2006	55	—	—	Zwischen Himmel und Erde
"Liebe mich Leben"	2006	—	—	—	Zwischen Himmel und Erde
"Dieser Fehler"	2007	—	—	—	Zwischen Himmel und Erde
"Zwei Herzen"	2008	29	—	—	Berge versetzen
"Berge versetzen"	2008	57	—	—	Berge versetzen
"Willst du bei mir bleiben"	2011	29	—	—	Aus lauter Liebe
"—" denotes a recording that did not chart or was not released in that territory.
