= Sukie =

Sukie are an English four piece indie band from Kettering, Northamptonshire, England, who formed in March 2006. They had a number one on the UK Indie Chart in 2008 with the double a-side "Pink-A-Pade" / "Fairies". Following the split of the band, singer-guitarist James Bagshaw joined the Moons before forming Temples in 2012.

== Band members ==
- Adam Branaghan – lead vocals, guitar
- James Bagshaw – lead vocals, guitar
- Andrew Barr – bass, harmonies
- Josh Ambler – drums, harmonies

== History ==
Sukie formed in March 2006 with their first gig supporting Shitdisco. Sukie have supported the Cribs, Captain, Sam Sparro, One Night Only and Look See Proof.

With song writing partnership of Branaghan / Bagshaw, their debut single "Pink-A-Pade" and live set that has seen them win rave reviews in publications such as The Fly, This is fake DIY, ArtRocker and Time Out.

Sukie are firm favourites of the local BBC Introducing show in Northamptonshire 'The Weekender' with a 5 out of 5 review for their first EP. The band have had a session recorded and many interviews about their progress.

Sukie have been announced as a BBC Introducing band for 2008. They have recorded a session for BBC Radio 1 at Maida Vale Studios and have had airplay by Huw Stephens on BBC Radio 1 and John Kennedy on XFM.

Their debut single "Pink-A-Pade" was released by New Slang Records on 23 June 2008. It went straight into number 1 in the UK Indie Chart w/e 29 June 2008.

=== Singles ===
- "Pink-A-Pade" (2006, New Slang Records, UK Indie Chart No. 1)
