= Tapete Records =

Record label

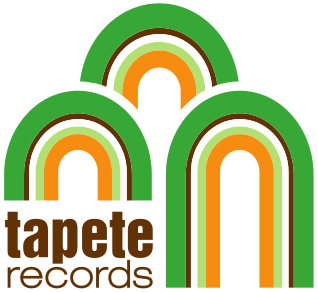
- Logo of Tapete Records
- Founded: in 2002
- Founder: Gunther Buskies, Dirk Darmstaedter
- Distributor: Indigo Musikproduktion + Vertrieb GmbH
- Genre: Indie
- Country of origin: Germany
- Location: Hamburg
- Official website: www.tapeterecords.de

Tapete Records is an independent record label based in Hamburg, Germany.

It was founded in 2002 by Gunther Buskies and Dirk Darmstaedter and primarily focused on Deutschpop Bands such as Erdmöbel, Niels Frevert, Tele and Anajo. Since 2005 Tapete Records also attends to international acts, for example from the US, Great Britain, Australia and Sweden. They include Lloyd Cole, The Monochrome Set, Louis Philippe, a.k.a. Philippe Auclair, The Telescopes, The Lilac Time, Robert Forster, Stereo Total, The Catenary Wires, Andreas Dorau, Bobby Conn, The Proper Ornaments, Pete Astor, Hellsongs, Lacrosse, Gary Olson, Bambi Kino, Christian Kjellvander, John Howard & The Night Mail, Last Days Of April and many more. So far, Tapete Records has put out more than 500 releases (as of November 2015). Tapete Records is internationally distributed by various distribution partners.

Tapete Records also contains the publishing company Tapete Songs and booking agency Howdy Partner Booking (former Tapete Booking). Tapete Songs features more than 6,000 published copyrights. Some of them were used in TV shows in the USA ( Better Call Saul, Chuck, Homeland), England (Skins) and Canada (Degrassi). Howdy Partner Booking promotes Tapete Records bands as well as bands from other labels, having a total of more than 70 artists in its repertoire (e.g. Bobby Conn, Bill Pritchard, The Proper Ornaments, Pete Astor, The Late Call, Robert Forster, John Howard & The Night Mail and more).

In 2005 Bureau B, a label for electronic, free spirited music, was added to Tapete Records roster.

== Artists ==
- 1000 Robota*
- Anajo
- Bambi Kino
- Bart Davenport
- Benjamin Dean Wilson
- Bernd Begemann & Die Befreiung
- Bill Pritchard
- Boy Omega
- Brace/Choir
- Chaplin
- Christian Kjellvander
- Clara Hill
- Darlo*
- Desiree Klaeukens
- Dial M for Murder!
- Die Höchste Eisenbahn
- Die Liga der gewöhnlichen Gentlemen
- Die Sonne
- Die Zimmermänner
- Dirk Darmstaedter´s Me And Cassity*
- Downpilot
- Dutch Uncles*
- Ecke Schönhauser
- Eight Rounds Rapid
- The Elephants*
- Erdmöbel*
- Ex-Void
- Ezio
- Fehlfarben
- Francesco Wilking
- Nick Garrie
- Geschmeido*
- The Grand Opening
- Hero & Leander
- Herpes
- Hellsongs
- HGich.T
- The Horror The Horror
- Hurricane No. 1
- Jack Beauregard
- Jean Poly*
- John Howard & The Night Mail
- Josh Ottum
- Junior High
- Kolkhorst*
- Kristofer Åström
- Lacrosse
- LAKE
- Lande Hekt
- Last Days Of April
- The Late Call
- The Lilac Time
- Lloyd Cole
- Louis Philippe - Philippe Auclair
- Maplewood
- Marcel Gein
- Martin Carr
- Men Among Animals
- Mobylettes
- The Monochrome Set
- Montag*
- Moritz Krämer
- Naked Lunch
- Neo Rodeo
- Next Stop: Horizon
- Nick Nicely
- Niels Frevert*
- Nom de Guerre
- Now, Now Every Children*
- Oliver Gottwald
- Paul Dimmer Band*
- Pollens
- A Projection
- Prolapse
- The Proper Ornaments
- Rantanplan*
- Robert Forster
- Saal 2
- Salim Nourallah
- Samba
- Schrottgrenze
- Schwefelgelb
- Simon Love
- The Soft Hills
- Superpunk
- Tele
- The Telescopes
- Tess Wiley*
- Trust Fund
- Wolke

The artists with * are former artists

== Hanse Song Festival ==
The Hanse Song Festival (organized by Tapete Records) took place for the first time in 2012. It is based in Stade, a town close to Hamburg which is famous for its historic city. It is a small festival with several folk and pop musicians performing in special and beautiful locations in the city center such as the town hall ( Königsmarcksaal), the court, the museum "Schwedenspeicher", Seminarturnhalle, St. Wilhadi-Kirche and more. In the first year nine artists performed on three different stages. Since then the numbers has risen to 18 artists, playing six different locations at the fourth Hanse Song Festival in March 2015. The Hanse Song Festival 2015 started with a musical reading by Rocko Schamoni und Tex M. Strzoda the day before the actual festival. Bands and artists that have played the Hanse Song Festival so far are, amongst others, Lloyd Cole (UK), Olli Schulz (D), Niels Frevert (D), Ezio (UK), ClickClickDecker (D), Luka Bloom (IRL), Bernd Begemann & Die Befreiung (D), Die Höchste Eisenbahn (D), Cäthe (D), Christian Kjellvander (SWE), Tim Neuhaus (D), Pohlmann (D), Hellsongs (SWE), Kat Frankie (AUS), Jan Plewka (D), Fotos (D), The Grand Opening (SWE), The Soft Hills (USA), and many more.

== Müssen Alle Mit Festival (MAMF) ==
The Müssen Alle Mit festival is an annual festival which takes place in Stade, Germany, every summer. It took place for the first time in 2013 and is organized by Tapete Records in association with the city of Stade. Müssen Alle Mit is a one-day open-air festival drawing around 2,000 visitors each year. The style of music reaches from rock and punk to indie pop and hip-hop. A special offer is the „Tour de MAMF“, a bicycle tour from Hamburg-Finkenwerder to Stade organised by "KonzertKulTour". It includes breakfast with jam and Mett and a reception with sparkling wine once the destination has been reached.

Line Up 2015: Nada Surf (US), Antilopen Gang (D), Käptn Peng & Die Tentakel von Delphi (D), Egotronic (D), Schrottgrenze (D), Rhonda (D), Oliver Gottwald (D), host: Friedemann Weise

Line Up 2014: Thees Uhlmann & Band (D), William Fitzsimmons (US), Die Höchste Eisenbahn (D), Mozes And The Firstborn (NL), Bernd Begemann & Die Befreiung (D), Brace/Choir (US/D), Soda Fabric (ISR), host: Bernd Begemann

Line Up 2013: Kettcar (D), Die Liga der gewöhnlichen Gentlemen (D), Me and my Drummer (D), Naked Lunch (D), Turbostaat (D), Tusq (D), host: Carsten Friedrichs

== See also ==
- List of record labels
