= Judith Holofernes =

German singer, guitarist, songwriter and author

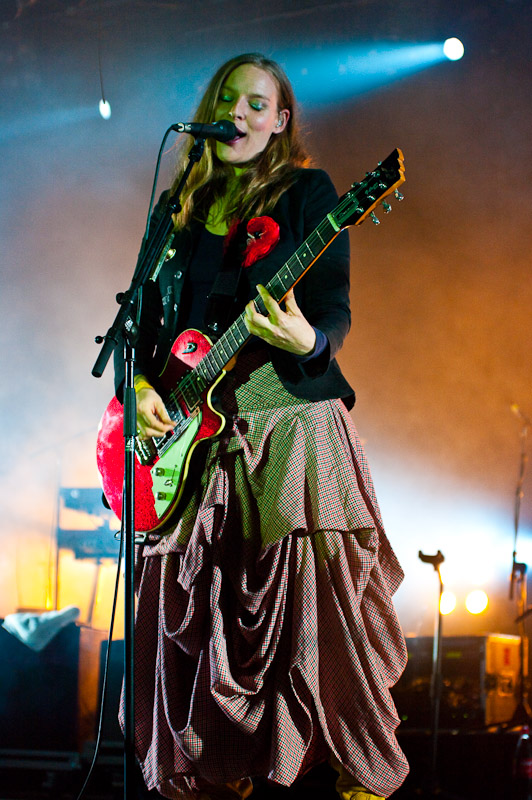
- Holofernes performing at the 2010 Open Flair Festival in Eschwege, Germany

Background information
- Also known as: Judith Holfelder-Roy
- Born: Judith Holfelder-von der Tann; 12 November 1976 (age 50)
- Origin: Berlin, Germany
- Genres: Rock, pop, alternative
- Occupations: Singer, guitarist, songwriter, author
- Instruments: Vocals, guitar
- Years active: Late nineties to present
- Labels: Labels (EMI), Columbia (Sony), Four Music (Sony)
- Website: www.judithholofernes.com

Judith Holfelder-Roy (née Holfelder-von der Tann; born 12 November 1976), known by her stage name Judith Holofernes (German pronunciation: [ˈjuːdɪt holoˈfɛʁnəs]), is a German singer, guitarist, songwriter and author.

She was the lead singer of Wir sind Helden, the German pop rock band that released the song "Guten Tag" in 2002. The band received critical acclaim owing in part to Holofernes' lyrics, which are characterized by their playful use of words and use of social criticism.

After recording four albums that were chart successes in the German-speaking world, Wir sind Helden went on indefinite hiatus in 2012. Since then, Holofernes has recorded two solo albums (Ein leichtes Schwert, 2014; Ich bin das Chaos, 2017) and has published a book of poems (Du bellst vor dem falschen Baum, 2015) and a memoir (Die Träume anderer Leute, 2022).

== Early life ==
Holofernes was born in Berlin and moved at the age of six with her mother to the city of Freiburg im Breisgau in the south of Germany. From the age of 14, she busked in the city's pedestrian zone as a singer/guitarist. After she received her secondary education at Staudinger Gesamtschule, she returned to Berlin to study communication in social and economic contexts at Berlin University of the Arts, but did not complete her studies. At the university, she was concerned with anti-consumerism, one of her activities being to set up the German website of Adbusters, a Canadian-based anti-consumerist magazine.

== Music career ==
=== Late nineties: Early endeavours ===
Holofernes was able to focus on music after leaving university. Towards the end of the nineties, she performed in Berlin clubs as a solo artist and self-released the EP Kamikazefliege (1999), though only 500 copies were produced. Some of the songs from the EP, such as "Außer dir" and "Aurélie", would be later re-recorded by Wir sind Helden for the band's debut album.

=== 2000–2012: Wir sind Helden ===
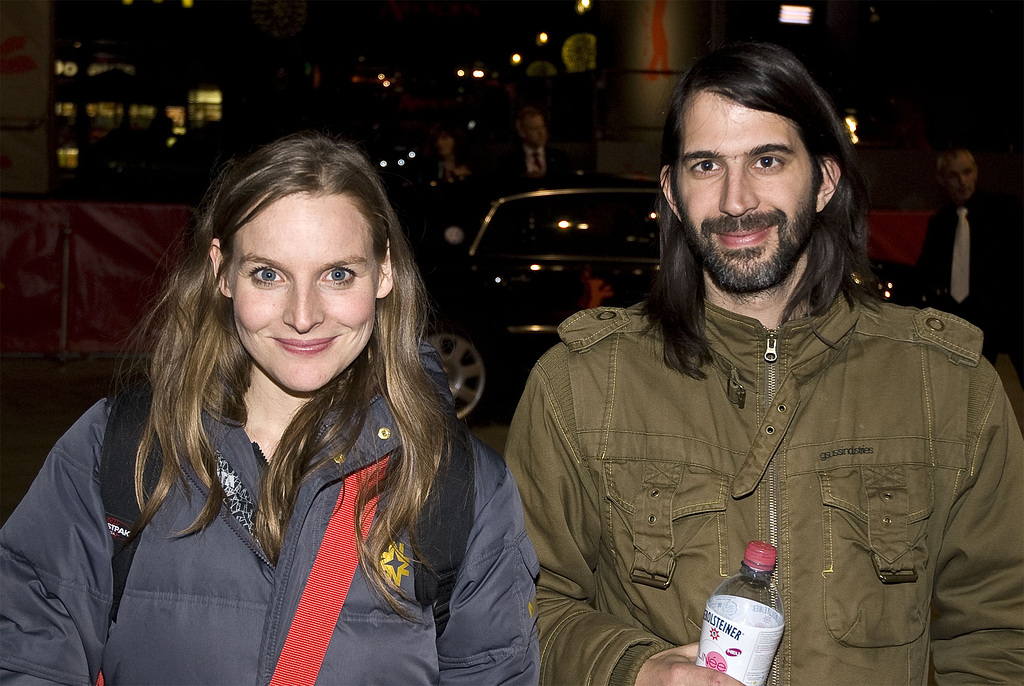
Holofernes in 2008 with her bandmate and husband, Pola Roy

In mid-2000, Holofernes met drummer Pola Roy, keyboardist/guitarist Jean-Michel Tourette and bassist Stefan Nietzky at a pop music workshop in Hamburg. They formed a band together, though Nietzky was later replaced by bassist Mark Tavassol. The band was initially briefly called Helden (which means "Heroes") before being renamed Wir sind Helden (which means "We are heroes"). Wir sind Helden's breakthrough came in 2002 without the support of a record label, when the band's song "Guten Tag" was played by radio stations and a self-produced music video for the song received heavy rotation on MTV Germany. The band subsequently signed to Labels and released its debut album Die Reklamation (2003), which was a top 5 hit in Germany and Austria and sold over half a million copies in Germany alone. The band went on to record the albums Von hier an blind (2005), Soundso (2007) and Bring mich nach Hause (2010), all of which reached high positions in the German, Austrian and Swiss charts. In April 2012, the band announced that it was taking an indefinite break owing to family commitments, the long distances between the band members' home cities, and "signs of wear and tear".

=== 2012 to present: Post-Wir sind Helden career ===
During her break from Wir sind Helden, Holofernes began composing songs informally using Apple software application GarageBand and then later decided to record them in the studio, with herself on guitar, piano and ukulele, Roy on drums, and Jörg Holdinghausen from German band Tele on bass. The songs appear on her solo album Ein leichtes Schwert, which was released in February 2014 and charted at No. 7 in Germany. Holofernes' newest album, Ich bin das Chaos, was released in March 2017. For the album, Holofernes collaborated with the Faroese singer-songwriter Teitur Lassen and her husband Pola Roy who produced the album. In 2019, Holofernes joined the crowdfunding platform Patreon. She received support by the American artist Amanda Palmer who has been using crowdfunding to finance her work since 2012. On the platform, Holofernes, amongst other things, shares essays and episodes of her podcast Salon Holofernes in which she talks to various artists. Holofernes' memoir, Die Träume anderer Leute, was published in September 2022. In the book, Holofernes reflects on her experiences with the music industry, focussing primarily on her time as a solo artist since the hiatus of Wir sind Helden. Her general conclusion is that, while her solo career was enjoyable and to an extent successful, it has been "overshadowed into" a failure by her Wir Sind Helden era. This is also reflected in the fact that she mostly lives off the copyright of her old songs.

=== Collaborations ===
Holofernes' voice appears on the song "X" from the album Supporters' Album #1 (2003) by German band Einstürzende Neubauten. She also sang background vocals for two songs by Tele on the band's album Wovon sollen wir leben (2004). Further vocal contributions by Holofernes can be heard on the song "Wir rühren uns nicht vom Fleck" (2004) by German band Die Sterne and "Armer Vater" (2006) by German band Olli Schulz und der Hund Marie. Together with Swedish singer Moneybrother, she recorded the song "Magic Moments", which appears on his album Mount Pleasure (2007). She has also collaborated with German band Die Höchste Eisenbahn, recording and performing the song "Vergangenheit" (2012), and with German singer Maxim, co-writing and recording the song "Meine Soldaten" (2013).

== Artistry ==
=== Stage name ===
Holofernes' stage name alludes to the Old Testament account of the beheading of Holofernes by Judith given in the Book of Judith. As a young teenager, Holofernes frequently heard the story of Judith and Holofernes from her uncles and aunts. She later decided in her late teens to use the two names to create her stage name.

=== Lyrics ===
Holofernes was the lead singer and guitarist of Wir sind Helden, and also the writer of the lyrics for the band's songs. She conveys her political opinions in many of her lyrics. For example, she criticizes consumerism in the song "Guten Tag", a performance-oriented society in "Müssen nur wollen", the music industry in "Zuhälter", and a dog-eat-dog society in "Konkurrenz". However, she has stated that politics are only one aspect of Wir sind Helden and that she is primarily a songwriter, writing love songs and songs of a whimsical nature with the same commitment as political songs. She is known for her playful use of words in the German language and has been described as a wordsmith in the tradition of German writers Robert Gernhardt and Christian Morgenstern. Songwriters that have had a major influence on Holofernes include Bob Dylan, Elvis Costello and Rio Reiser.

== Other activities ==
Holofernes maintains her own blog, where she has posted her opinions on topical issues, anecdotes from Kreuzberg (the area of Berlin where she lives), and Tiergedichte (animal poems). A collection of her Tiergedichte was published in October 2015 in her first sole-authored book, titled Du bellst vor dem falschen Baum. Her previous book was Wir sind Helden – Informationen zu Touren und anderen Einzelteilen (2008), a band autobiography written with the other members of Wir sind Helden.

In July 2011, Holofernes presented Summer of Girls, a season of programmes on French-German television channel arte concerning women in the pop music industry.

== Public image ==
=== Media appearances ===
Following the breakthrough of Wir sind Helden in 2002, the band received much attention from the media, including the quality newspapers, owing in part to Holofernes' sociocritical lyrics in songs such as "Guten Tag" and "Müssen nur wollen". Holofernes subsequently became a much sought after personality for interviews and has appeared on German talk shows such as Die Harald Schmidt Show. In 2010, she made an appearance on political talk show Maybrit Illner, participating in a discussion titled "Bürgeraufstand 2010 – regiert die Politik am Volk vorbei?" ("Civil uprising 2010 – are the people being ignored by politics?").

=== Activism ===
Holofernes lends her support to the Tibet Initiative, a German organization campaigning for human rights and self-determination in Tibet; Attac, a global organization seeking an alternative to neo-liberal globalization; and Viva con Agua, a German charity campaigning for clean drinking water worldwide. She is also a supporter of green issues; in 2011, she performed with the other members of Wir sind Helden at an anti-nuclear power demonstration in Berlin following the Fukushima Daiichi nuclear disaster.

=== Public criticism of the Bild newspaper ===
In 2011, Holofernes had a public argument with advertising agency Jung von Matt when it asked her if she could participate in an advertising campaign for Bild, Germany's most widely read tabloid, even though she had been critical of Bild in the past. She responded by posting an open letter on the Wir sind Helden website, where she criticized the campaign and Bild. At the end of the letter, she stated: "The Bild newspaper is a dangerous political instrument: it's not only a telescope which strongly magnifies into the abyss, but also a malicious entity which is not describing Germany, but shaping it instead – with an agenda." (Note: Literal translation of the following extract from Holofernes' open letter to Jung von Matt: "Die Bildzeitung ist ein gefährliches politisches Instrument – nicht nur ein stark vergrößerndes Fernrohr in den Abgrund, sondern ein bösartiges Wesen, das Deutschland nicht beschreibt, sondern macht. Mit einer Agenda.") The letter attracted much attention, causing the Wir sind Helden website to go down. Bild subsequently reproduced the letter without Holofernes' consent in a single-page advertisement in German newspaper Die Tageszeitung, with a caption at the end thanking Holofernes for her honest and unpaid opinion.

== Personal life ==
Holofernes married Roy, fellow member of Wir sind Helden, in July 2006 and gave birth to their son in December of the same year. The couple had a second child, a daughter, in August 2009. Holofernes and Roy are both Buddhists; in 2007, she met the Dalai Lama.

She is a fan and also close friends with the singer Teitur. She owns a dog named Lupita. As of now, she does not agree with some of her old lyrics.

In 2018, due to a combination of work related stress and exhaustion, motherhood and meningitis, she practically lost her voice which was fragile from the beginning, susceptible to allergies, asthma and infections. Since 2022, she has been doing voice therapy and can sing along to "Dolly Parton and Joni Mitchell", though in a different pitch and tone than she used to.

== Discography ==
- Kamikazefliege (1999)
- Ein leichtes Schwert (2014)
- Ich bin das Chaos (2017)

== Bibliography ==
- Wir sind Helden (2008). Informationen zu Touren und anderen Einzelteilen (in German). Fischer Taschenbuch Verlag. ISBN 3596177545.
- Holofernes, Judith (2015). Du bellst vor dem falschen Baum (in German). Tropen. ISBN 978-3608501520.
- Holofernes, Judith (2022). Die Träume anderer Leute (in German). Kiepenheuer & Witsch ISBN 978-3-462-00367-3
