= Tommy Finke =

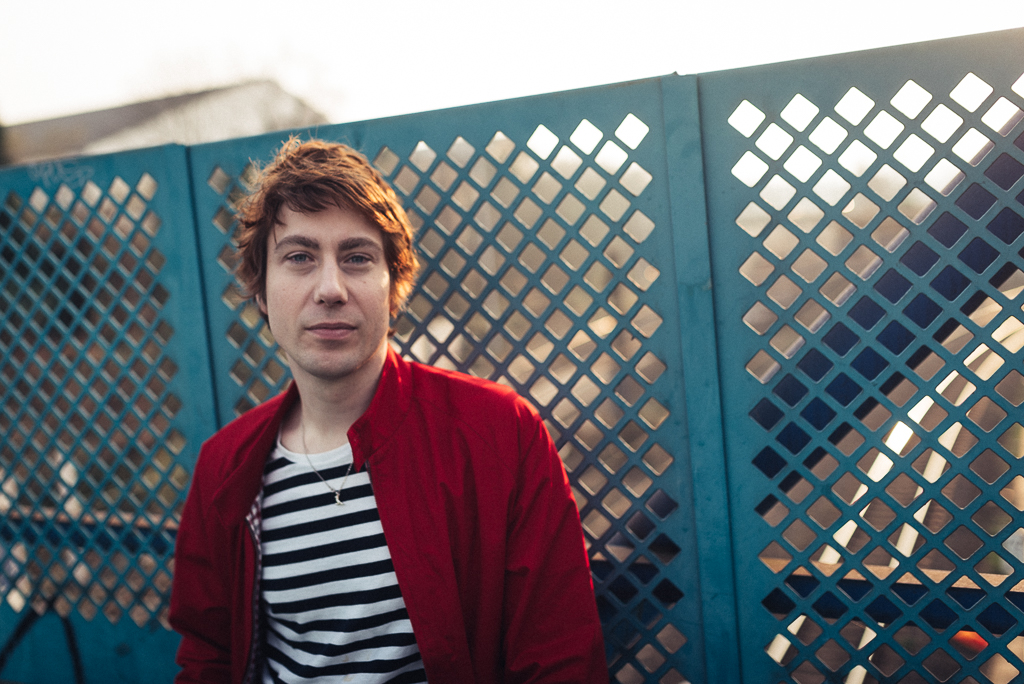

Background information
- Born: Thomas David Finke; 4 February 1981 (age 45); Bochum, West Germany
- Origin: Bochum, Hamburg
- Genres: Power pop, emo, punk rock (early)
- Occupations: Songwriter, vocalist, guitarist, composer
- Instruments: Vocals, guitar, piano, harmonica, synthesizer
- Years active: 1998–present
- Labels: Retter des Rock Records; ROOF Music
- Website: Official website

Tommy Finke (born as Thomas David Finke February 4, 1981), sometimes using the pseudonym T.D. Finck von Finckenstein, is a German singer-songwriter and multi-instrumentalist. He is known for his work in indie, alternative, and pop music, as well as for composing electronic music, theater scores, and film soundtracks. From 2015 to 2020, Finke served as the musical director at Schauspiel Dortmund.

Finke began performing his own songs in 1997 and has drawn inspiration from a diverse range of artists, including Oasis, The Beatles, The Cure, and Rio Reiser. Over the years, he has established himself as a composer in the German theater and film industries.

== Bio ==
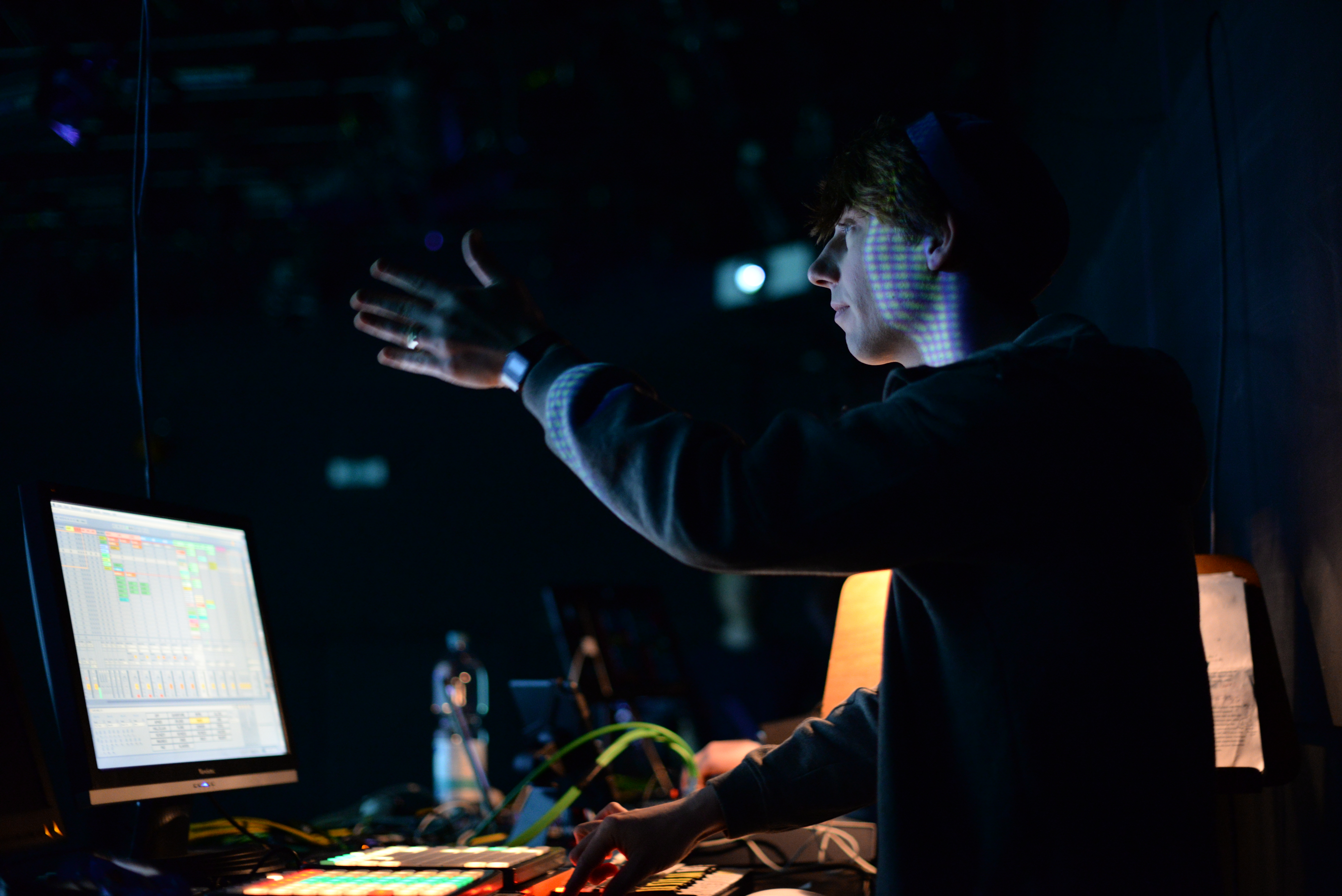
Tommy Finke during a theatre performance, 2014

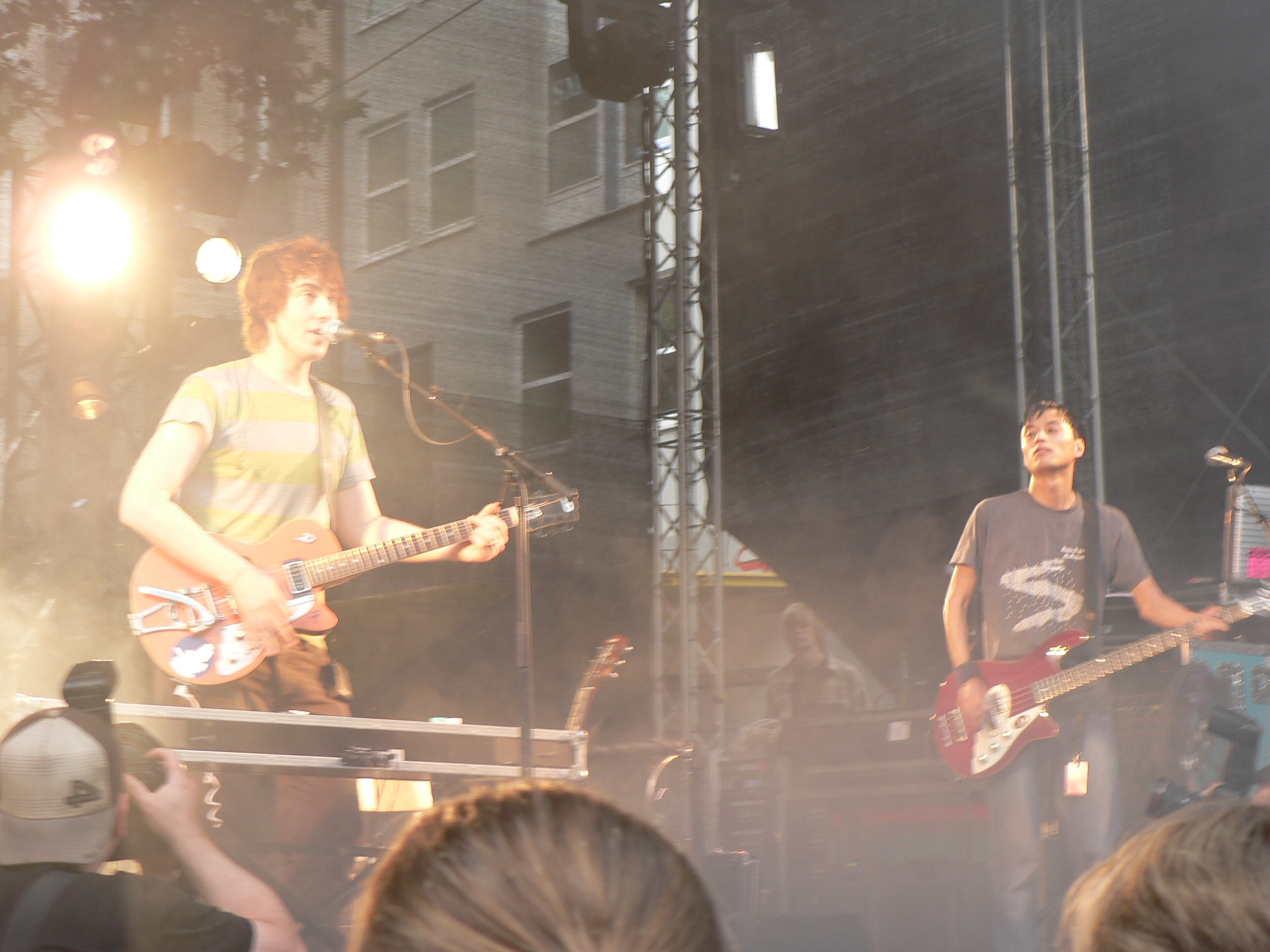
Tommy Finke & Band at Bochum Total, 2009

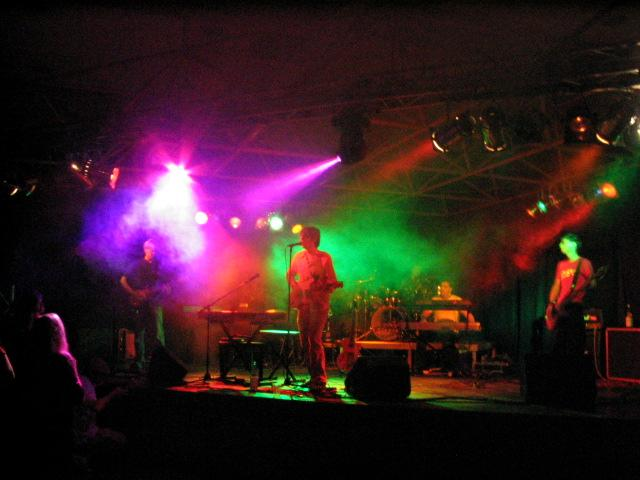
Tommy Finke & Band live, 2004

Tommy Finke was born Thomas David Finke in Bochum, West Germany. Since 1998 he has been on stage, first playing cover versions of Oasis songs, and later his own material. Bands like The Beatles, The Cure, Rio Reiser and The Police are the main influences in his work, as well as German Indie bands like Tocotronic and Die Sterne.

Finke was the lead singer of different project bands before he finally started his own band, called "Stromgitarre", in 1999. However, since he wrote all the music and lyrics, the band was renamed "Tommy Finke & Stromgitarre" in 2003. The band was later renamed again and became "Tommy Finke & Band".

Tommy Finke studied "Elektronische Komposition" at the Folkwang Hochschule in Essen from 2003 on. In 2008, he graduated but decided to continue his studies in order to learn more about modern music.

In 2007, Tommy Finke founded his own record label, "Retter des Rock Records", in order to release his debut album "Repariert, was Euch kaputt macht!", which was released as a vinyl record in 2007 and re-released as a CD Version in 2008.

Tommy Finke and his band took second place at the nationwide German "Jugend kulturell Förderpreis 2008" on 11 November.

In August 2009, Tommy Finke announced there will be a new record entitled "Poet der Affen / Poet of the Apes" in early 2010 due to a record deal with German label Roof Music. The recording sessions for this album started in October 2008.

"Poet der Affen / Poet of the Apes" was released as a double album on 29 January 2010. It contains 13 songs, each recorded in German and English. This is unique for a German singer/songwriter. On the title track of the album, well-known skeptic James Randi is heard speaking an introduction.

"Unkämmbar" was released on 28 March 2013 as a special edition album.

=== Theatre ===
For the play Das goldene Zeitalter – 100 Wege dem Schicksal die Show zu stehlen by Kay Voges Finke composed a complete musical soundtrack. The play premiered on 13 September 2013 at Theater Dortmund.

In 2014 Tommy Finke composed music for 4.48 Psychosis written by Sarah Kane, also directed by Kay Voges. Equipped with body-sensors the actors' body-data controls parts of the composition. It premiered on 3 May 2014 at Theater Dortmund.

== Releases ==
=== Pop music ===
==== Discography ====
- 2008 Repariert, was Euch kaputt macht! (10 Songs, Retter des Rock Records, Vinyl, CD and online)
- 2010 Poet der Affen / Poet of the Apes (13 songs (26 tracks in German and English), ROOF Music, Indigo)
- 2013 Unkämmbar (AREA Entertainment)

==== Singles/EPs ====
- 2004 1000 Meilen (8-Track-EP, 5 songs, Baukau Media/Rough Trade)
- 2007 Repariert, was Euch kaputt macht! – Single (2-track online release, Retter des Rock Records)
- 2010 Halt' alle Uhren an / Stop the Clocks (digital release, ROOF Music)
- 2012 Canossa
- 2012 Kämmbar?
- 2013 Heimathafen (Single)

As "Tommy Finke & Miniband":

- 2011 Robert Smith in meiner Kneipe (digital release, Retter des Rock Records)

With other artists:

- 2012 Yellow (digital Release, Retter des Rock Records, coverversion of Coldplay's song, together with Polyana Felbel and Daniel Brandl)

==== Remixes for other artists ====
- 2006 R.M.X. 3000 Tommy Finke Remix of the song O.S.T. 3000 of German band Helter Skelter (Band)
- 2007 Fieber (Discofox Remix) Tommy Finke Remix of the song "Fieber" of German band Tele (Band)
- 2007 Monkey Fingers (Tommy Finke Remix) Remix of the song of the same name by German band Atomic
- 2007 The Shelter (Tommy Finke Remix) Remix of the song of the same name by German band Atomic
- 2008 "Mausen (Tommy Finke and the cat in the hat Remix)" Remix of the song "Mausen" by German Band MIA.
- 2009 The Bomb Song (Tommy Finke Didn't Start The Fire Remix) Remix of the song of the same name by German band Verlen
- 2009 Become (Tommy Finke Near The Dunes of Neverland Remix) Remix of the song of the same name by German band Verlen
- 2009 I Sold My Heart Today (Tommy Finke Wake Up Mix) Remix of the song of the same name by German band Morning Boy
- 2009 Oh Suzanne (Tommy Finke Put Your Make Up on Remix) Remix of the song of the same name by German band Atomic as a free download

==== Soundtracks ====
- 2004 Wer braucht schon ein Sektfrühstück bei Real Madrid? (Film soundtrack, Baukau Media/Rough Trade)

==== Released on compilations ====
- Rock'n'Roll – Leben on 1Live Zukunftsmusik, 2005
- 1000 Meilen on Aufnahmezustand Vol. 4, Zyx Music, 2005
- 1000 Meilen (Live) and Um den Schlaf gebracht (Live) on HypoVereinsbank – Jugend kulturell Förderpreis 2008 "Popmusik", HypoVereinsbank, 2008

==== Film scores ====
- Lemmingsfrühling, 2001. Director: Daniel Nipshagen
- Bar Las Jornadas, 2003. Director: Martin Brand
- Lurie, 2003. Szenenmusik. Director: Martin Brand
- Wer braucht schon ein Sektfrühstück bei Real Madrid?, 2004. Director: Ben Redelings
- 100 Stunden nonstop, 2005. Director: Ben Redelings
- Unterholz, 2005. Director: Jan Kretschmer
- Nordstadt, 2005. Szenenmusik. Director: Michael Kupczyk
- Die 11 des VFL, 2007. Director: Ben Redelings

==== Coverversions ====
- Du erkennst mich nicht wieder originally performed by Wir sind Helden and Judith Holofernes, 2006
- Ohne dich originally performed by Rammstein, 2007

==== Released as producer / audio engineer ====
- Hosenkrebs Etüde by Hummelgesicht, recorded, produced, and mixed, 2002
- Ich verstehe mein Leben by Sandrakete, mixed and partly recorded, 2007
- Demo by Johannes Zaster Band, recorded, produced, and mixed, 2007

=== Theatre & Dance ===
- Kaspar Hauser und die Sprachlosen aus Devil County by Thorsten Bihegue and Alexander Kerlin at Schauspiel Dortmund, composer and musical director, 2015
- The Return of Das goldene Zeitalter – 100 neue Wege dem Schicksal das Sorgerecht zu entziehen by Alexander Kerlin and Kay Voges at Schauspiel Dortmund, composer and musical director, 2015
- Endstation Sehnsucht by Tennessee Williams at Schauspiel Frankfurt, composer and musical director, 2014
- Reverse_Me by Fabien Prioville at Goethe-Institut Montréal, composer and musical director, 2014
- 4.48 Psychose by Sarah Kane at Schauspiel Dortmund, composer and musical director, 2014
- Das goldene Zeitalter – 100 Wege dem Schicksal die Show zu stehlen by Alexander Kerlin and Kay Voges at Schauspiel Dortmund, composer and musical director, 2013

=== Art Music ===
==== Installation art / Musical compositions ====
- Meine kleine Nachtmusik, 2005. 4-channel electronic piece, based on samples of a recording of Mozarts Eine kleine Nachtmusik. Produced at the ICEM of the Folkwang Hochschule, Essen-Werden.
- Driver, 2005. Cooperation with video artist Martin Brand.
- Attack, 2006. Cooperation with video artist Martin Brand.
- Bleach, 2006. Cooperation with video artist Martin Brand.
- light emitting idiot, 2007. Cooperation with Florian Mattil, Jan Rusch and Christof Schnelle.
- Swell, 2007. Cooperation with artist Ulrich Ostgathe. Looping Installation.
- Was Es Nicht Ist 1 (Aura-Varianten), 2008. 7-channel electronic piece for 4 loudspeakers and 3 guitar amplifiers, with light composition.
- Wenn ein Werk die Form einer Birne hat, ist es nicht mehr formlos!, 2008. 2-channel tape music, dealing with certain aspects of the music of Erik Satie.
