= Sa Itte Miyo =

Compilation album by Wir Sind Helden
- Released: May 14, 2008
- Recorded: 2002–2007
- Genres: Pop, pop rock
- Label: Indie's House
- Producers: Patrik "El Pattino" Majer; Wir Sind Helden

Wir Sind Helden chronology
Soundso (2007)	Sa Itte Miyo (2008)	Bring mich nach Hause (2010)

Singles from Sa Itte Miyo
- 1. "Sa Itte Miyo" Released: May 14, 2008

サァ イッテ ミヨウ (romanised: Sa Itte Miyo, "Now Then, Go Ahead") is the fifth album, and second compilation album by Wir sind Helden, released on 14 May 2008 in Japan. The album consisted of a number of tracks from their first three albums (Die Reklamation, Von Hier An Blind, and Soundso) along with a Japanese version of Von Hier An Blind.

The album was the group's first official release in Japan, and included many singles preceding its release, all of which charted in Germany, though only "Sa Itte Miyo" charted in Japan.

== Track listing ==
All songs were written by Wir Sind Helden.

No.	Title	Length
1.	"Sa Itte Miyo" (Japanese Version Of "Von Hier An Blind")	3:30
2.	"Endlich Ein Grund Zur Panik"	3:43
3.	"Guten Tag"	3:35
4.	"Ein Elefant Für Dich"	4:42
5.	"Ist Das So?"	3:04
6.	"Die Konkurrenz"	3:44
7.	"Zuhälter"	3:30
8.	"Gekommen Um Zu Bleiben"	3:10
9.	"Soundso"	4:14
10.	"Aurélie"	3:33
11.	"Kaputt"	3:08
12.	"Geht Auseinander"	3:10
13.	"Nur Ein Wort"	3:56
