= Die Höchste Eisenbahn =

German band

Die Höchste Eisenbahn is a German band from Berlin, consisting amongst others of the singer-songwriters Francesco Wilking and Moritz Krämer.

== History ==
The singer-songwriter Francesco Wilking – singer of the band Tele (band) – and Moritz Krämer planned a joint gig in Dresden. After more gigs they created the band project Die Höchste Eisenbahn. The name was chosen because Wilking liked the picture of a "train driving like on stilts". In colloquial German something being "höchste Eisenbahn" indicates that it is urgent.

For a tour in fall 2012 they were joined by musicians Max Schröder (Tomte (band), Olli Schulz) and Felix Weigt and they became part of the band. The first EP Unzufrieden was released on 14 September 2012 by Tapete Records. The debut album Schau in den Lauf, Hase was released on 8 November 2013. The second album Wer bringt mich jetzt zu den Anderen was released on 26 August 2016.

== Current members ==
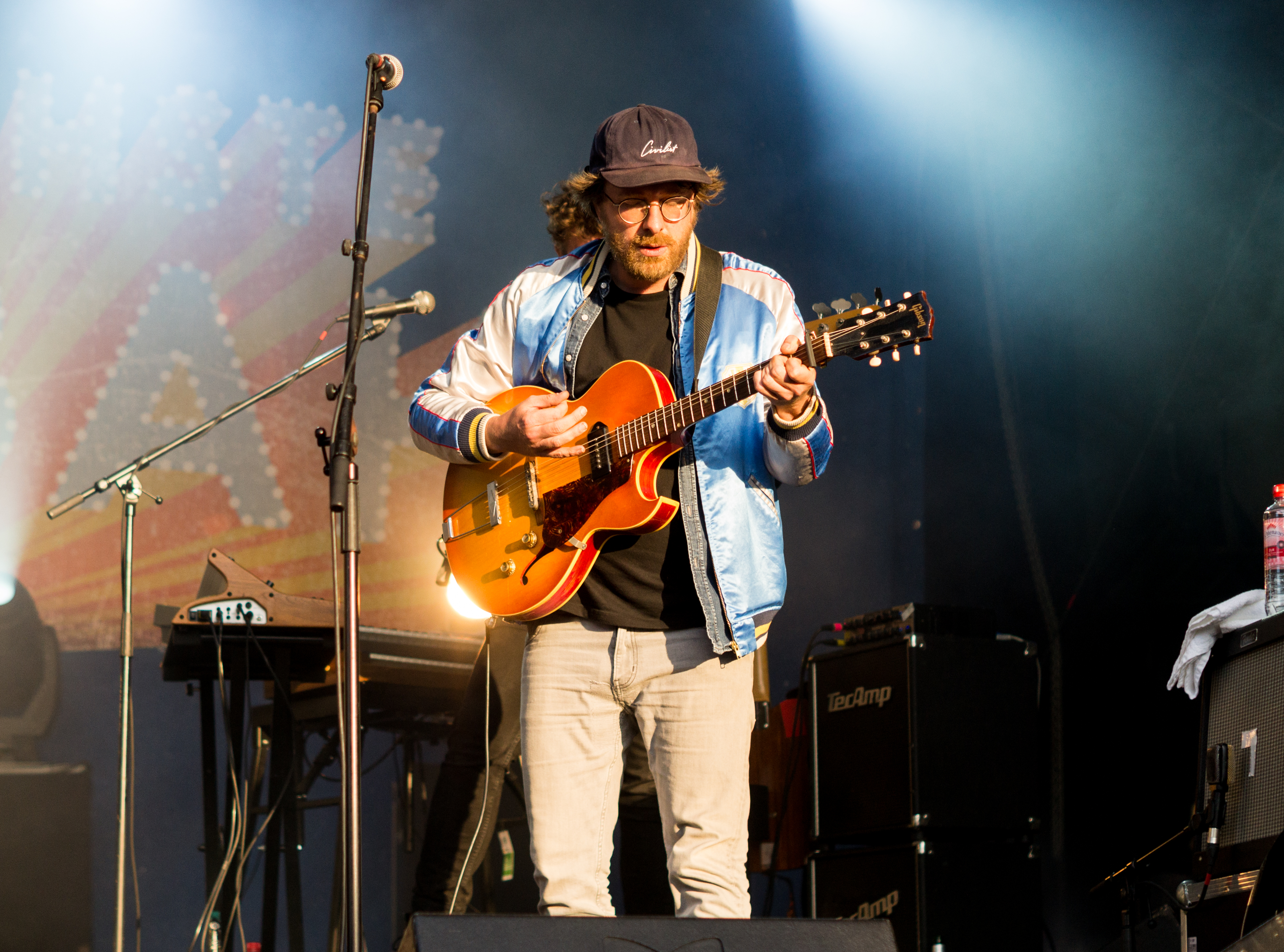
Francesco Wilking

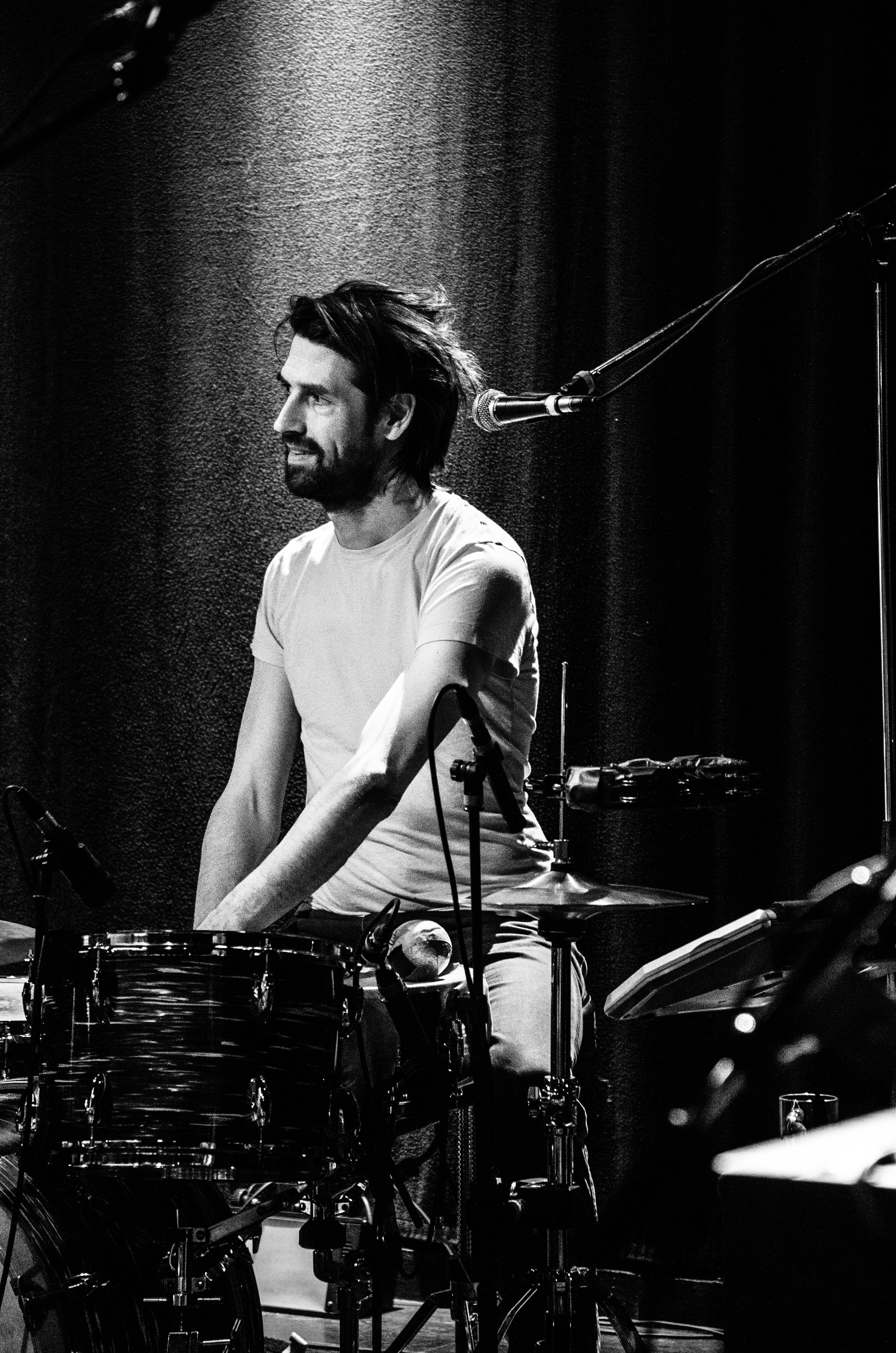
Max Schröder

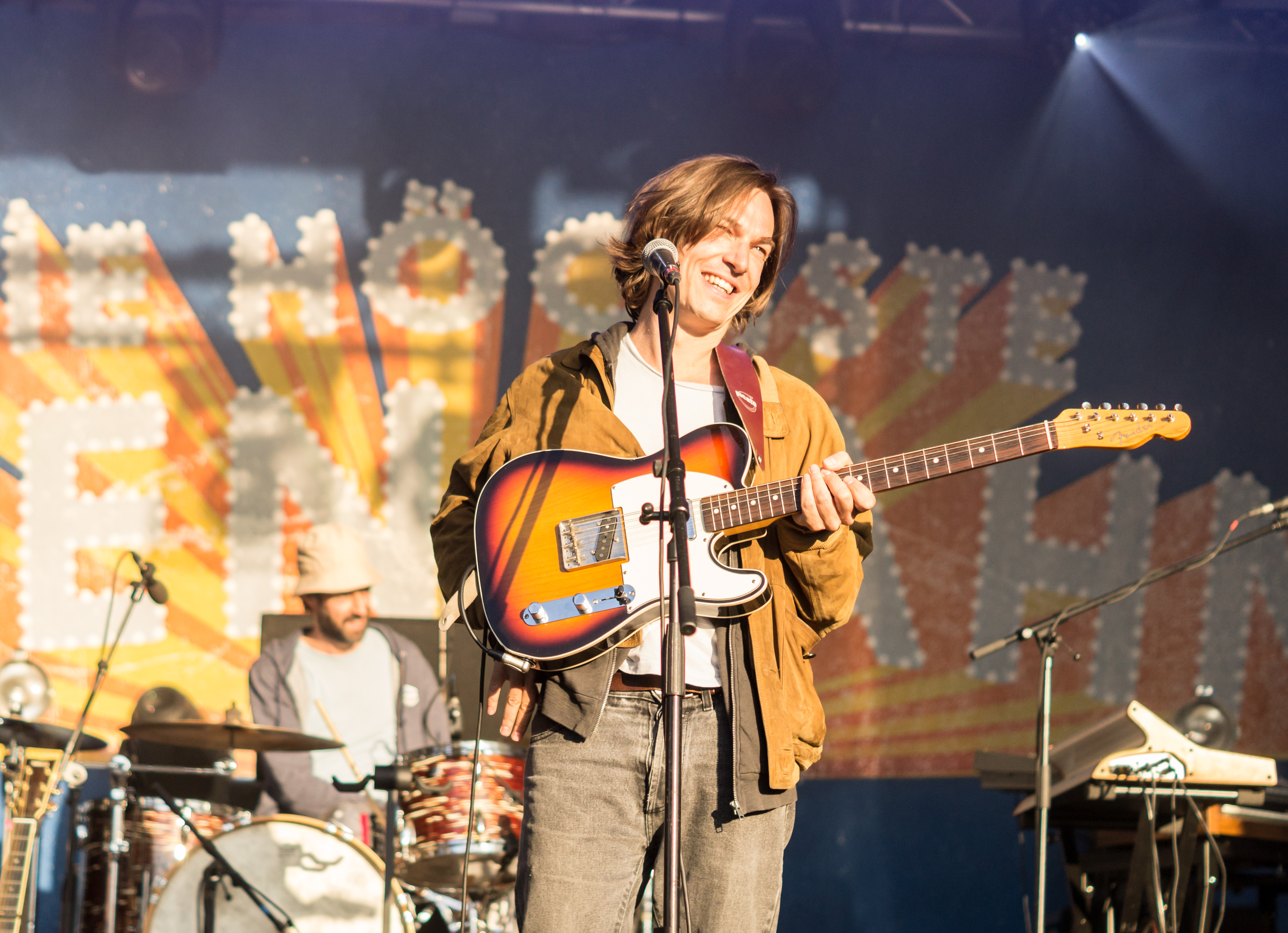
Moritz Krämer

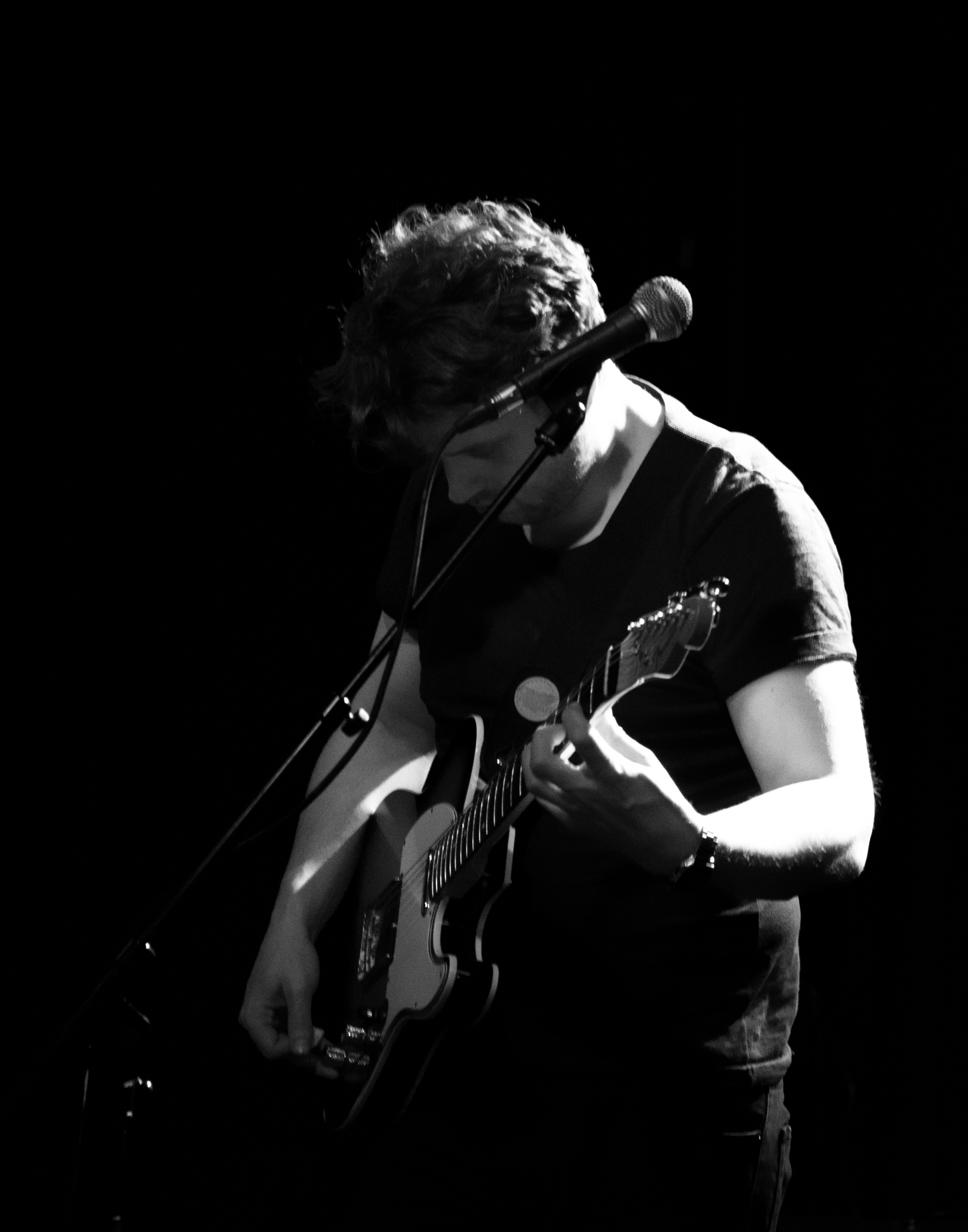
Felix Weigt

== Discography ==
Albums und EPs

- 2012: Unzufrieden (EP)
- 2013: Schau in den Lauf, Hase
- 2016: Wer bringt mich jetzt zu den Anderen
- 2019: Ich glaub dir alles

Singles

- 2014: Raus aufs Land
- 2016: Lisbeth
- 2016: Blume
