= Tele (band) =

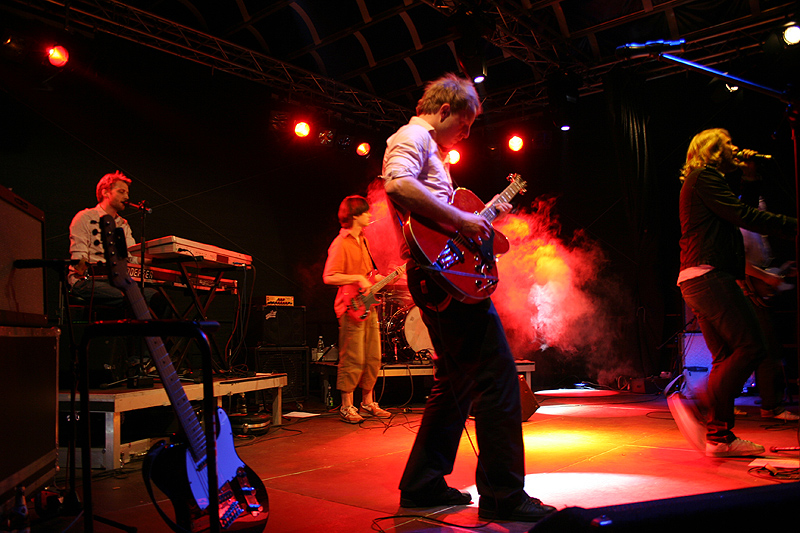
- Tele live (2007)

Background information
- Origin: Freiburg, Baden-Württemberg, now: Berlin, Germany
- Genres: rock, pop
- Years active: 2000–present
- Labels: Tapete, Universal Music
- Members: Francesco Wilking (vocals); Tobias Rodäbel (guitar); Martin Brombacher (guitar); Stefan Wittich (percussions); Jörg Holdinghausen (Electric upright bass); Patrick Reising (keyboard)

Tele is a German rock/pop band from Freiburg (now Berlin).

== Band history ==
Before being signed to Tapete Records a few years later, Tele self-produced their debut album, Tausend und ein Verdacht, in 2000. Their sound and style consisted of an indie rock guitar sound, and they arranged their songs in a post-rock way.

The record company Tapete Records from Hamburg distributed their album in 2002 and published an EP with five new songs. Tapete Records published their second album, Wovon sollen wir leben, in 2004. This album contains mainly German pop songs with background stories in the texts. In the majority of cases, the texts deal with the individual's everyday life, often with respect to their love affairs. Tele's music resembles that of the 1980s, but not necessarily in an intentional, retro-fashioned way. This is due to the use of keyboard arrangements and synthesizer-wind instruments.

For their third full-length LP, Wir brauchen nichts, Tele began experimenting with different sounds, taking inspiration from the 1940s, lullabies, and choir music. Sound engineer Patrik Majer, who also arranged the production for the band Wir sind Helden, produced the album. Lead singer Fransceco Wilking featured on Wir sind Helden's third album Soundso, singing an exchange with Judith Holofernes. To date, Wir brauchen nichts is Tele's most commercially successful record due to the success of the single Mario, which Tele used to represent the state of Baden-Württemberg at the Bundesvision Song Contest. The song ranked at number 10 after viewer votes.

In June 2006, shortly before the completion of the third album, Tele executed a tour through Africa (South Africa, Mozambique, Namibia, Zimbabwe, Tanzania, Zanzibar, and Madagascar) by order of the Goethe-Institut. In October 2007, Tele played (with the Berlin Band MIA.) on behalf of the Goethe-Institut again, this time in China (Nanjing).

2009 saw the release of their most recent LP, Jedes Tier, which received critical acclaim from both music critics and fans alike.

The band went on hiatus after completing their promotion of Jedes Tier, releasing a live album documenting the tour shortly after. Francesco Wilking has produced a solo record, Die Zukunft liegt im Schlaf, and started another pop rock band with Moritz Krämer. Die höchste Eisenbahn released their debut album Schau in den Lauf Hase in November 2013. As of 2014, they are touring Germany to promote the record. It is unknown if and when Tele will reform for a new project as their former website, 'teledieband.de' is no longer available.

== Work with other artists ==
- Judith Holofernes sings the background vocals in two songs on the 2004s album.
- On the song "Für nichts garantieren" by Wir sind Helden Francesco Wilking sings together with Judith Holofernes.
- Tele were the opening act on the "Wir sind Helden" tour 2008

== Discography ==
=== Albums ===
- 2000 Tausend und ein Verdacht (first own distribution, then distributed by Tapete Records)
- 2004 Wovon sollen wir leben (Universal Music)
- 2007 Wir brauchen nichts (Universal Music)
- 2009 Jedes Tier (Tapete (Indigo))

=== EPs ===
- 2003 Tele (Tapete Records)

=== Singles ===
- 2004 Falschrum (Universal Music)
- 2005 Es kommt ein Schiff (Universal Music)
- 2007 Mario (Universal Music)
- 2007 Fieber (Universal Music)
- 2007 Bye Bye Berlin (Universal Music)

=== Live albums ===
- 2007 Live aus dem Postbahnhof (Tapete)
- 2010 Jedes Tour (Tapete)

=== Compilation contributions ===
- 2003 "Now Now Now" auf „Müssen alle mit" (Tapete Records)
- 2004 "Wunder in Briefen" auf „Müssen alle mit 2" (Tapete Records)
- 2004 "Now Now Now" auf „Immergutrocken" (Grand Hotel van Cleef)
- 2005 "Es kommt ein Schiff" auf „Müssen alle mit 3" (Tapete Records)
- 2007 "Mario" auf „Müssen alle mit 4" (Tapete Records)

=== Remixes ===
- 2005 "Falschrum (Rework Remix)"
- 2007 "Mario (Erobique Slick Mix)" by Erobique (International Pony)
- 2007 "Fieber (Discofox Remix)" by Tommy Finke

== Music videos ==
- Falschrum
- Es kommt ein Schiff
- Wiemir (live)
- Mario
- Fieber
