= Emma6 =

German indie and pop rock band

EMMA6
- Origin: Heinsberg, Germany
- Genres: Indie rock; Pop rock
- Years active: 2005–present
- Labels: Universal Music; Ferryhouse
- Members: Peter Trevisan; Henrik Trevisan; Dominik Republik; (since 2016) Florian Sczesny
- Website: www.emma6.de

Emma6 (stylized as EMMA6) is a German indie rock and pop band founded in 2005 in Heinsberg. The band consists of singer and guitarist Peter Trevisan, his brother Henrik on drums, and bassist Dominik Republik. Since 2016, guitarist Florian Sczesny has accompanied Emma6 at live performances.

The band’s name is based on the first name of a Scottish exchange student who was visiting Heinsberg, combined with a reference to the British intelligence service MI6, chosen from the band's affinity for James Bond ("EMMA6" and "MI6" are pronounced similarly).

== History ==
Emma6 gained extensive live experience, among other things as a supporting act for Wir sind Helden, before releasing their debut single Paradiso in April 2011, which entered the German singles charts. By the end of the month, they released their first studio album, Soundtrack für dieses Jahr (Soundtrack for this year). In the same year, they played their first headlining tour across Germany. The band also used 2012 to produce their second album Passen, with the help of Mark Tavassol, bassist of Wir sind Helden.

While their earlier releases appeared on the major label Universal Music, Emma6 released their third album Wir waren nie hier (We were never here) in 2017 on the Hamburg-based indie label Ferryhouse. The title track was written by Florian Sczesny. The album was recorded live at the Energiekreis Zuckerhut Studios in Bonn and produced by David Maria Trapp. In the process, the band reduced their use of synthesizers and instead incorporated acoustic guitars, piano, brass, and strings. The album briefly entered the German charts, and the subsequent tour was largely sold out.

In 2020, the EP Möglichkeiten was released, again with the involvement of Sczesny. It contains four songs with a deliberately stripped-down sound.

The band released their fourth studio album, Alles Teil des Plans (All part of the plan), in 2022.

== Discography ==
Studio albums

- 2011: Soundtrack für dieses Jahr (Universal Music Domestic Pop)
- 2013: Passen (Universal Music Domestic Pop)
- 2017: Wir waren nie hier (Ferryhouse)
- 2022: Alles Teil des Plans (Ferryhouse)

EPs

- 2020: Möglichkeiten (Ferryhouse)

Singles

- 2011: "Paradiso" (Universal Music Domestic Pop)
- 2011: "Leuchtfeuer" (with Josefine Preuß, Universal Music Domestic Pop)
- 2013: "Wie es nie war" (Universal Music Domestic Pop)
- 2013: "Passen" (Universal Music Domestic Pop)
- 2016: "Lemminge" (Ferryhouse)
- 2016: "Das Haus mit dem Basketballkorb" (Ferryhouse)
- 2017: "Kapitulieren" (Ferryhouse)
- 2017: "10 Jahre" (Ferryhouse)
- 2020: "Hey, Hey, Hey "(with Selig, Ferryhouse)
- 2020: "Drei Platten in einem Jahr" (Ferryhouse)
- 2020: "Gut für dich" (Ferryhouse)
- 2020: "Weiterwandern" (Ferryhouse)
- 2022: "Blinder Fleck" (Ferryhouse)
- 2022: "Nicht nach Haus" (Ferryhouse)
