= Guten Tag =

Single by Wir sind Helden

from the album Die Reklamation
- Released: November 18, 2002 (EP); February 3, 2003 (single)
- Recorded: 2002
- Studio: Freundenhaus, Berlin
- Genre: Pop; rock
- Length: 3:36
- Label: EMI
- Songwriters: Judith Holofernes; Jean-Michel Tourette; Pola Roy
- Producer: Patrik Majer

Wir sind Helden singles chronology
| "Guten Tag" (2002) | "Müssen Nur Wollen" (2003) |

Audio sample
- file; help

Alternative cover
- EP cover

“Guten Tag” is a 2002 song by German band Wir sind Helden. It was first released on an EP of the same title in 2002 and one year later as the first single of their debut album Die Reklamation. It was composed by Jean-Michel Tourette, Judith Holofernes and Pola Roy while the lyrics were written by Holofernes. The title is German for good day.

== Song information ==
“Guten Tag” criticises commodification. In the lyrics, Holofernes tells a story in which she was blinded by the glittering world of consumption making her want everything she sees and changing her life for them (“Meine Stimme gegen ein Mobiltelefon, meine Fäuste gegen eure Nagelpflegelotion.../My voice for a mobile phone, my fists for your manicure lotion...”). These statements are all paradoxes as she always offers parts of her body or life she would need to have to use the products she demands. However, in the refrain, she soon realises that all these things do not make her happy after all which makes her demand her life back (“An dem Produkt ist was kaputt - das ist die Reklamation/There is something wrong with this product - this is the complaint”). “The complaint” would also be the title of the album the single is taken from. Informally, the song itself is also referred to by this name.

=== Excerpt ===
Guten Tag, guten Tag ich will mein Leben zurück
Ich tausch nicht mehr, ich will mein Leben zurück
Guten Tag, ich gebe zu ich war am Anfang entzückt
Aber euer Leben zwickt und drückt nur dann nicht wenn man sich bückt
Guten Tag!

==== English translation ====
Hello, hello, I want my life back
I'm not swapping any more, I want my life back
Hello, I'll admit at first I was delighted
But your life itches and twitches unless you bend over
Hello!

== Music video ==
The music video does not directly reflect the content of the song but shows the band's way to the first album in an ironic way. The whole clip is shown as a comic strip and at the beginning it presents Wir sind Helden as a teen band (their ages are indicated as 16, 18, 14) during their rehearsals. Judith announces that she has just written a song, which is “Guten Tag” and the other band members love it. While the band plays the music, a stereotyped record producer enters the room saying “That is fresh!” while he thinks “Criticism of consumption + sex = €”. He offers them a record contract but they first turn it down (Mark Tavassol says “The music industry sucks”). Later, they accept it after all getting blinded by their expectations of the show business. The music video can be seen as an answer to the critics who stated that criticism of commodification is never authentic when commercially released.

== Commercial success ==
The single entered the German single charts where it peaked at number 53. It stayed in the top 100 for eight weeks. However, based on the high album sales, “Guten Tag” received heavy airplay in Germany. Based on chart positions, it is the third most successful single of the band's debut album (following “Denkmal” and “Aurélie”). The single did not chart in any other country.

It also appeared in the soundtrack of the game FIFA 04. A French version, named "Guten Tag (La Réclamation)" was recorded for the compilation album Wir sind Helden released in France in 2006. A music video of this version was also released.

== Track list ==
The regular single included the original studio version of the song, a remix, the music video and a making of video. Furthermore, a remix of another album track - “Die Zeit heilt alle Wunder” - was included. The EP included also the follow-up singles “Müssen nur wollen” and “Denkmal” as well as the album track “Du erkennst mich nicht wieder” and the non-album track “Alphamännchen”.

=== EP ===
1. “Guten Tag” – 3:36
2. “Müssen nur wollen” – 3:35
3. “Du erkennst mich nicht wieder” – 4:56
4. “Denkmal” – 3:18
5. “Alphamännchen”

=== Single ===
1. “Guten Tag” – 3:36
2. “Guten Tag (Ich bin Jean) ” – 4:22
3. “Die Zeit heilt alle Wunder” (Homerecording, extended Aaaaaargh-version) – 4:45
4. “Guten Tag” (video)
5. “Guten Tag” (making of)

== Reception ==
Overall, “Guten Tag” was a success with the critics. Most of them compared the song to German music of the 1980s (“Neue Deutsche Welle” and praised the clever and original lyrics. However, some critics stated that the anti-commercial content of the song is not very authentic as it never can be on a commercially released album or single.

An English version of Guten Tag was recorded in 2007 by the band +44. The meaning is relayed the same however the lyrics have been changed for a better North American reception.

== Credits and personnel ==
- Produced, recorded and mixed by Patrik Majer
- Vocals and guitar by Judith Holofernes
- Bass guitar by Mark Tavassol
- Keyboards by Jean-Michel Tourette
- Drums by Pola Roy
