= Maxim (artist) =

German singer and songwriter (born 1982)

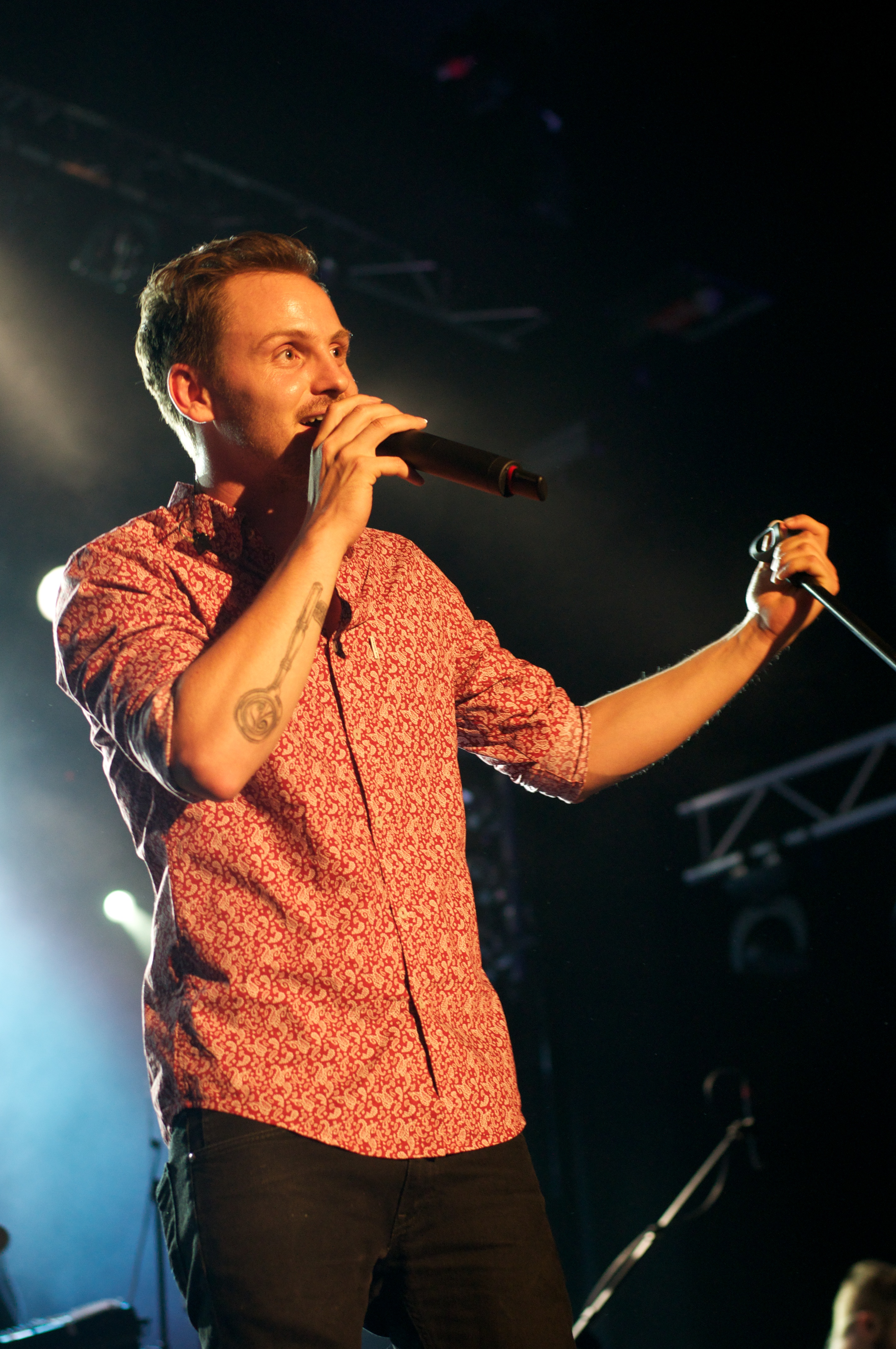
- Maxim Richarz in 2014

Background information
- Origin: Siegburg, Germany
- Genres: Europop
- Years active: 2005–present
- Labels: Warner Music Group
- Website: www.maximmusic.net

Maxim Richarz (born May 15, 1982) is a German singer and songwriter. He began performing in 2005 and released his most recent singles in 2014. Though called a Reggae artist he is hesitant to refer to himself as such and does more contemporary work in recent years.

== Early life ==
Maxim was born in Königswinter, Germany to a French mother and German father. Maxim attended the University of Cologne for a Business Administration degree. He dropped out and went to the SAE Institute (an international media education provider) to become a sound engineer, a decision he says he later regretted when money dried up in the artistic field. Maxim dropped out of the SAE Institute after a semester, finding the work to be boring and too easy. He refers to himself as "self-taught" and says that "his first day of school was also his last."

After his various schooling endeavors, Maxim produced a semi-professional tape with Bonner Nosliw, who already had established a reputation for himself on the German music scene. He also took Maxim as a background singer on tour. Maxim calls this time "like an internship. [He found it] interesting and it helped [him] a lot." This time later shaped a lot of Maxim's musical preferences and served as an inspiration for his future work.

== Personal life ==
When asked about his music being somewhat melancholy and thoughtful, and whether that translates to his personality, Maxim replied that he's a thoughtful person. He is, however, also a joker, and believes most artists to be similar. He feels that the difference between him and most artists is that he needs a lot of time to write a song; sitting alone in a room for hours on end. The longer you think, according to him, the darker and more melancholy things appear. If you write about yourself going to a party or getting drinks with your friends, then you'd have to go do that in order to achieve that mood in a song. Maxim himself enjoys upbeat music but rarely engages in making it.

Maxim also criticizes other artists indirectly by attacking themes of their songs. While "[he] might possibly feel for two minutes sad because [he's] in love with someone and they don't love me back, but certainly not two months," saying that only things that give you deep feelings worthy of content should be written about. He also jokes about his inspiration, saying that "[he's] been writing music for ten years and [he] still has no idea where this inspiration comes from" and that if he knew where it was, he would hang around it and safely release an album every two months.

== Musical career ==
Maxim initially experimented with Reggae, however he slowly transitioned to a more contemporary pop music style. He quipped in an Interview that "Reggae and economics are [his] worst mistakes" and does not like much of his earlier music, thus precipitating the change in style. His singles Meine Soldaten (My Soldiers), Haus aus Schrott (House of Scrap), and Rückspiegel (Rearview Mirror) all made it on to top 100 charts for both Switzerland and Germany. His album Staub (Dust) was released in 2013 and is seen, both by him and objectively by critics, as his greatest success yet. It similarly made the top 100 chart in Switzerland, and the top 10 in Germany. He collaborated with fellow German artist Judith Holofernes in the production of Staub.

Maxim's music is frequently credited as having a strong emotional impact, with his lyrics often having darker emotional undertones. He is praised for his ability to both have this darker tone while keeping his music powerful and easy to listen to. He claims that his secret, in terms of musical success, is that he only writes about things that touch him, which lead to that strong, emotional, powerful sound that often comes out in his work. In creating "Haus aus Schrott" (House of Scrap), he says the song creates pictures and explains nothing, leaving interpretation up to the listener. He wants to create more of this going forward, as the meaning for the song comes from within the listener.

Maxim took a short hiatus from performing in the early months of 2013 due to a minor illness he contracted in Vietnam.

== Discography ==
Albums
2005: Maxim
2008: Rückwärts fallen (Falling Backwards)
2011: Asphalt
2013: Staub (Dust)
2014: Staub Live (Dust Live)
2016: Das Bisschen was wir sind (The Little Bit We Are)
2017: Reprise

Singles
2013: Meine Soldaten (My Soldiers)
2013: Rückspiegel (Rearview Mirror)
2013: Haus aus Schrott (House of Scrap)
2014: Alles versucht (2.0) (Tried Everything (2.0))
2014: Staub (Dust)
2016: Willkommen im Club (Welcome to the Club)
2016: Pille aus Luft (Pill of Air)
2016: Autsch
2017: Reprise II
