= Wir sind Helden =

German pop rock band

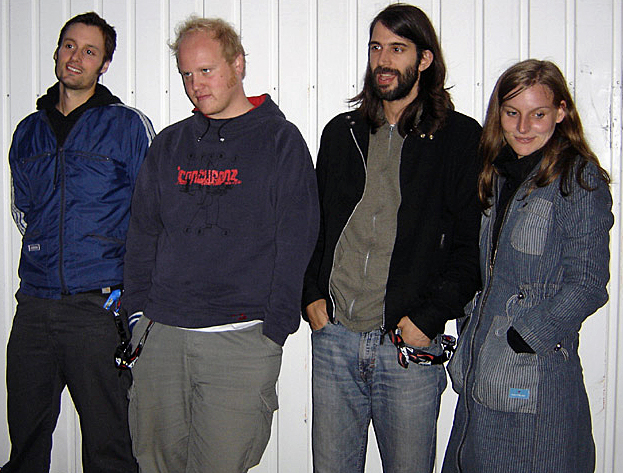
- Wir sind Helden, from left to right: Mark Tavassol, Jean-Michel Tourette, Pola Roy and Judith Holofernes

Background information
- Origin: Berlin, Germany
- Genres: Pop, pop rock, alternative rock
- Years active: 2000–2012
- Labels: Labels (EMI), Columbia (Sony)
- Past members: Judith Holofernes; Pola Roy; Mark Tavassol; Jean-Michel Tourette
- Website: wirsindhelden.com

Wir sind Helden (German pronunciation: [viːɐ̯ zɪnt ˈhɛldn̩], German for "We are heroes") was a German pop rock band that was established in 2000 in Hamburg and based in Berlin. The band was composed of lead singer and guitarist Judith Holofernes, drummer Pola Roy, bassist Mark Tavassol and keyboardist/guitarist Jean-Michel Tourette. (Note: In a 2003 interview, Holofernes stated that Wir sind Helden was a band in Berlin, rather than a Berlin band, as only she and Roy were residents of Berlin, whereas Tavassol and Tourette lived in Hamburg and Hannover.)

Wir sind Helden's breakthrough came in 2002 with the release of the song "Guten Tag", even though the band did not yet have a recording contract. The ensuing debut album, Die Reklamation, reached No. 2 in the German charts and sold over half a million copies. Over the rest of the decade, the band released the albums Von hier an blind, Soundso and Bring mich nach Hause, all of which peaked at No. 1 or No. 2 in the German and Austrian charts.

Wir sind Helden's music shows influences from the Neue Deutsche Welle, especially in the debut album Die Reklamation. The band's music is also characterized by social commentary in songs such as "Guten Tag" and "Müssen nur wollen". In April 2012, the band informed its fans that it was going on indefinite hiatus.

== History ==
=== 2000–2002: Early years ===
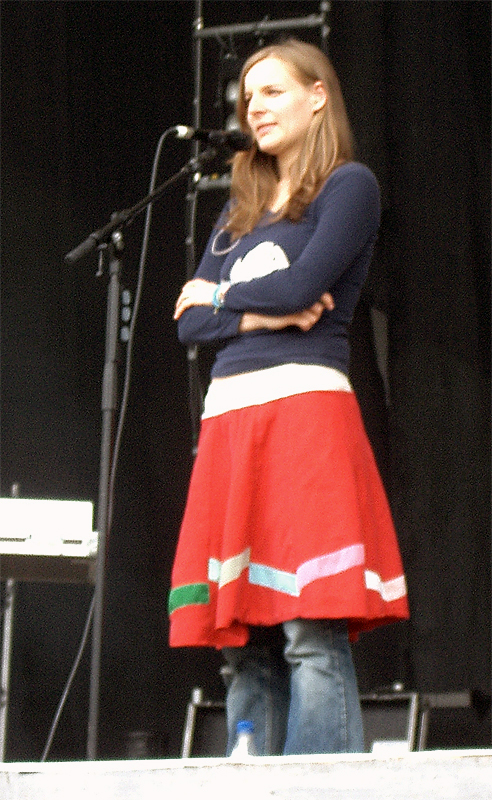
Judith Holofernes

Prior to the formation of Wir sind Helden, singer-songwriter and guitarist Judith Holofernes was performing in Berlin clubs as a solo artist and had self-released the EP Kamikazefliege (1999). The band was founded in 2000 after she met drummer Pola Roy and keyboardist/guitarist Jean-Michel Tourette at a pop music workshop in Hamburg. Soon thereafter, Mark Tavassol joined the band as bassist.

The idea behind using the word "Helden" (which means "heroes") in the band name was to reclaim the word for the antiheroes ("Der Begriff 'Helden' wird jetzt so inflationär benutzt. Wir wollten ihn zurückhaben für die Antihelden." English: "The term 'heroes' is so inflated now. We want it back for the anti-heroes."). In addition, the band name was also inspired by German band Die Helden, which was the first band Holofernes saw performing live, and by the song "'Heroes'" by English singer David Bowie, whom Holofernes has cited as a role model for the band.

In 2002, Wir sind Helden self-released the EP Guten Tag. Despite the band's lack of recording contract, the title song was played by German radio stations and its music video was aired on the rotation of MTV Germany. The band consequently attracted the attention of several record companies and then signed with Labels, an EMI label. The growing interest in the band also led to Holofernes being invited to appear on Die Harald Schmidt Show, a late-night talk show on German television.

=== 2003–2004: Die Reklamation ===
Wir sind Helden's debut single, "Guten Tag", was released in February 2003, and the follow-up single was "Müssen nur wollen", released in May 2003. The criticisms of modern-day life in both songs (the former relating to consumerism and the latter concerning the pressure to achieve) brought the band to the attention of newspaper culture sections. Both singles entered the German singles chart, where they reached No. 53 and No. 57, respectively.

The two singles were followed by Wir sind Helden's debut album, Die Reklamation, which was released in July 2003. In addition to uptempo, punk-influenced songs such as the previously released "Guten Tag" and "Müssen nur wollen", the album also includes melancholic songs such as "Die Zeit heilt alle Wunder" and "Du erkennst mich nicht wieder".

German news website Spiegel Online declared that Wir sind Helden's sound reconciled the good sides of New Wave and Neue Deutsche Welle with the modern era, and it named Die Reklamation as one of the most important CDs of 2003. In his review of the album, Stefan Friedrich of music magazine laut.de described Holofornes as the woman currently writing the most intelligent, witty and beautiful German song lyrics.

Die Reklamation entered the German albums chart at No. 6 before peaking at No. 2 and eventually selling over 500,000 copies. At the 2004 ECHO music awards, Wir sind Helden was the recipient of three awards.

=== 2005–2006: Von hier an blind ===
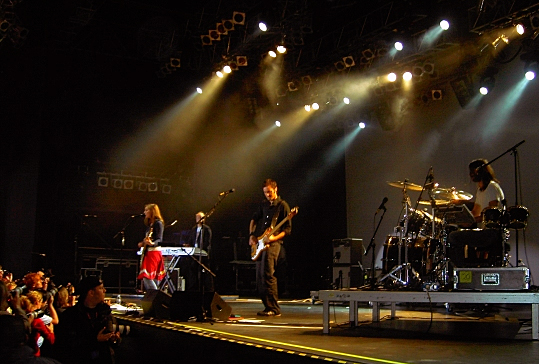
Wir sind Helden performing at Museumsplatz in Bonn, Germany in 2005

Released in April 2005, Wir sind Helden's second album, Von hier an blind, saw the band become more introspective and less political compared to Die Reklamation. Speaking in an interview, Holofernes stated that the album was concerned with asking what was it deep inside that prevented happiness ("Ich habe mich gefragt, was mich tief im Inneren davon abhält, glücklich zu sein").

In comparison with Die Reklamation, Von hier an blind gives less prominence to keyboard sounds and Neue Deutsche Welle influences. The album also includes the swing number "Gekommen um zu bleiben", which Wir sind Helden performed with a live orchestra at the 2005 ECHO music awards.

Von hier an blind went straight to the top of the German albums chart and stayed in the top 10 for twenty weeks. The album also charted at No. 1 in Austria. Two singles from the album, "Gekommen um zu bleiben" and "Nur Ein Wort", were both top 30 hits in the German singles chart.

Later in 2005, Wir sind Helden was one of the headliners at German rock music festival Rock am Ring and was one of the acts performing in Berlin as part of the series of Live 8 concerts. The following year, Holofernes and Roy married and started a family.

=== 2007–2009: Soundso ===
The third album by Wir sind Helden, Soundso, was released in May 2007 and reached No. 2 in both the German and Austrian albums charts. Speaking in an interview, Tavassol explained that the common theme of the album was that of distribution of roles, individuality, and personalities within the various roles ("Es gibt dabei einen roten Faden, das ist das Thema Rollenverteilung, Individualität und letztendlich Persönlichkeiten in den verschiedenen Rollen").

Soundso saw a development in Wir Helden's sound, with Neue Deutsche Welle influences reduced to a minimum and the incorporation of further musical elements such as horns, glam guitars and virtual orchestras. The album also saw the introduction of "musical humour" to the band's music: according to Tourette, duophonic guitars and synthesized saxophones were used because of their cheesiness and charm ("Zweistimmige Gitarren einzusetzen, ist im deutschen Pop genauso verpönt, wie synthetische Saxofone zuzulassen. Wir haben jetzt beides auf dem Album, weil sie schön cheesy klingen, aber Charme haben").

The first single released from Soundso was "Endlich ein Grund zur Panik", a hectic synthpop song with a swing and ska climax backing up the choruses. While polarizing fans, the single went to No. 34 in the German charts.

=== 2010–2011: Bring mich nach Hause ===
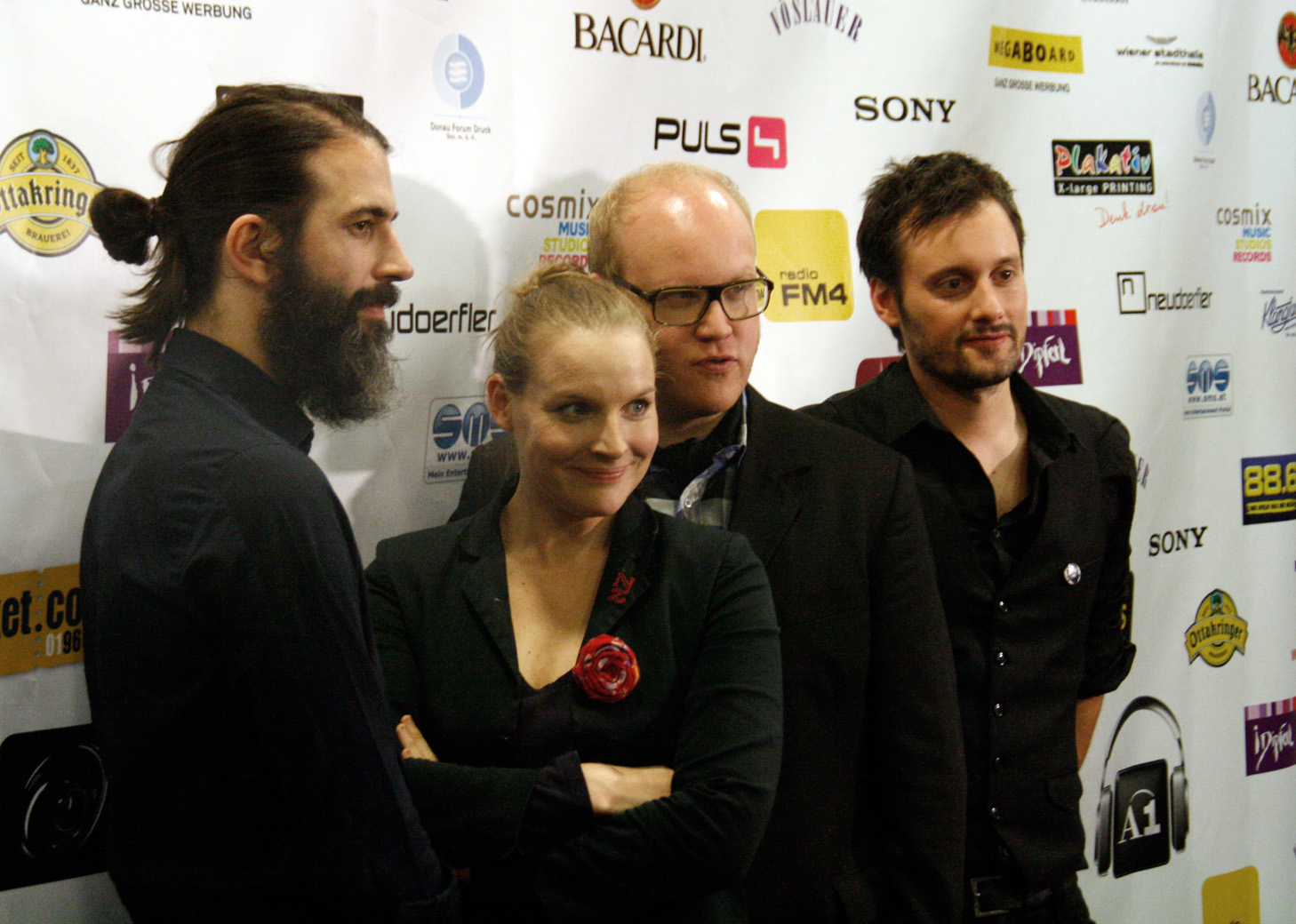
Wir sind Helden at the 2010 Amadeus Austrian Music Awards

After three years away from the spotlight, Wir sind Helden returned in August 2010 with Bring mich nach Hause, the band's fourth album. The band had by then signed to Sony Music following the break-up of Labels. In addition, Wir sind Helden had parted ways with Patrik Majer, who had produced the band's previous three albums, with the new album being produced by English producer Ian Davenport.

For the recording of Bring mich nach Hause, Wir sind Helden strived to use real instruments over synthesizers. Additional instruments which can be heard on the album include the accordion, oud, banjo and glockenspiel. In addition, bassist Jörg Holdinghausen from German band Tele was involved in recording the album as guest musician and vocalist.

Speaking in an interview, Holofernes stated that Bring mich nach Hause had both a melancholic side and a euphoric side, and cited "Alles" as the song which best embodied these two sides. "Alles" was the first single released from the album and reached No. 36 in the German singles chart. The album itself went to No. 1 in Germany and Austria.

It was during this period that Wir sind Helden toured with the pop-rock band EMMA6 from Heinsburg.

=== 2012: Indefinite hiatus ===
On 4 April 2012, it was announced on the official Wir sind Helden website that the band was going on an indefinite hiatus. The band members cited the distance between their home cities, the demands of their family lives, "signs of wear and tear", and the feeling of an increasingly impossible undertaking ("...so haben wir trotz numeroser echter Kinder, dreier Heimatstädte und diverser Abnutzungserscheinungen festgehalten an einem immer unmöglicher werdenden Unterfangen..."). In February 2014, Holofernes released her first post-Wir sind Helden solo album, Ein leichtes Schwert.

== Musical style ==
Wir sind Helden has been referred to as a pop band or pop rock band in the German press. In an interview at the time of the release of Die Reklamation, Roy acknowledged that the band's music had Neue Deutsche Welle influences and added that it contained indie rock as well. He further stated that Holofernes's song writing was influenced by Elvis Costello, Bob Dylan and Rio Reiser.

== International activities ==
Wir sind Helden held two back-to-back concerts in London, England in 2005, playing in front of 500 fans on each occasion. Two years later, the band returned to London to perform at the Institute of Contemporary Arts as part of the 2007 iTunes Festival. Other foreign countries in which the band gave live performances include Austria, Belgium, France, Luxembourg, the Netherlands and Switzerland.

In 2007, the iTunes Store launched its series of "iTunes Foreign Exchange" singles, where two artists from countries with different languages are paired up to cover each other's music. The first single released features American band +44 and Wir sind Helden, with the former providing an English cover of "Guten Tag" and the latter doing a German cover of the +44 song "When Your Heart Stops Beating". The original versions of the songs are also included in the single.

Video game company EA Sports used the Wir sind Helden songs "Guten Tag" and "Endlich ein Grund zur Panik" for the soundtracks of its association football games. The songs appear on FIFA Football 2004 and FIFA 08, respectively.

Two Wir sind Helden compilation albums were released outside Germany: Sa Itte Miyo, which was released in Japan, and "Wir sind Helden", which was released in France. For these albums, some songs were re-recorded in Japanese or French.

== Band members ==
- Judith Holofernes (real name: Judith Holfelder von der Tann) – lead vocals, guitar
- Pola Roy (real name: Sebastian Roy) – drums
- Mark Tavassol – bass
- Jean-Michel Tourette (real name: Jens Eckhoff) – keyboards, guitar

== Discography ==
Wir sind Helden discography
- Studio albums: 4
- Compilation albums: 3
- Singles: 17

=== Studio albums ===
Year	Album details	Peak chart positions				Certifications
Year	Album details	GER	AUT	SWI	NLD	Certifications
2003	Die Reklamation: Released: 7 July 2003; Label: Labels (EMI); Formats: CD	2	3	38	—	GER: 5× Gold; AUT: Platinum
2005	Von hier an blind: Released: 3 April 2005; Label: Labels (EMI); Formats: CD, digital download	1	1	5	72	GER: 2× Platinum; AUT: 2× Platinum
2007	Soundso: Released: 25 May 2007; Label: Labels (EMI); Formats: CD, digital download	2	2	11	—	GER: Gold; AUT: Gold
2010	Bring mich nach Hause: Released: 27 August 2010; Label: Columbia (Sony); Formats: CD, digital download	1	1	13	—	GER: Gold

Note: Die Reklamation, Von hier an blind and Soundso were also each released as a limited edition album with bonus DVD. Bring mich nach Hause was also released as an unplugged album.

=== Compilation albums ===
Year	Album details	Peak chart positions				
Year	Album details	GER	AUT	SWI	FRA	JPN
2006	Wir sind Helden: Released: 29 May 2006 (France only); Label: Labels (EMI); Formats: CD	—	—	—	—	—
2008	Sa Itte Miyo: Released: 14 May 2008 (Japan only); Label: Indie's House; Formats: CD	—	—	—	—	—
2011	Tausend wirre Worte – Lieblingslieder 2002–2010: Released: 21 January 2011; Label: Labels (EMI); Formats: CD, digital download	12	50	87	—	—

=== Singles ===
Year	Single	Album	Peak chart positions				
Year	Single	Album	GER	AUT	SWI	NLD	JPN
2003	"Guten Tag"	Die Reklamation	53	—	—	—	—
2003	"Müssen nur wollen"	Die Reklamation	57	—	—	—	—
2003	"Aurélie"	Die Reklamation	47	—	—	—	—
2004	"Denkmal"	Die Reklamation	26	41	—	—	—
2005	"Gekommen um zu bleiben"	Von hier an blind	24	4	39	—	—
2005	"Nur ein Wort"	Von hier an blind	28	13	—	—	—
2005	"Von hier an blind"	Von hier an blind	12	53	—	—	—
2006	"Wenn es passiert"	Von hier an blind	41	34	—	24	—
2007	"Endlich ein Grund zur Panik"	Soundso	34	32	—	—	—
2007	"Soundso"	Soundso	62	—	—	—	—
2007	"Kaputt"	Soundso	69	—	—	—	—
2008	"Die Konkurrenz"	Soundso	—	—	—	—	—
2008	"Sa Itte Miyo"	Sa Itte Miyo	—	—	—	—	85
2010	"Alles"	Bring mich nach Hause	36	—	—	—	—
2010	"Bring mich nach Hause"	Bring mich nach Hause	90	—	—	—	—
2011	"Alles auf Anfang"	Bring mich nach Hause	63	—	—	—	—
2011	"Die Ballade von Wolfgang und Brigitte"	Bring mich nach Hause	99	—	—	—	—

=== Other releases ===
- Guten Tag (2002) – 5-track EP independently released, 3000 copies produced
- iTunes Foreign Exchange #1 (2007) – single available from iTunes
- iTunes Festival: London 2007 (2007) – 6-track EP available from iTunes
- Live @ Rockpalast (2012) – live video album

== Awards ==
- ECHO
  - 2004: National Newcomer Prize (from Deutsche Phono-Akademie), National Newcomer Prize (from radio vote), National Newcomer Video (for "Müssen nur wollen")
  - 2006: Group of the Year (National)
- Eins Live Krone (radio station award)
  - 2003: Best Newcomer
  - 2004: Best Live Act
  - 2005: Best Album (for Von hier an blind)
- European Border Breakers Award
  - 2005: Awarded for Die Reklamation
