= Bring mich nach Hause =

Studio album by Wir Sind Helden
- Released: 27 August 2010
- Genres: Pop, pop rock
- Length: 48:15
- Label: Columbia

Wir Sind Helden chronology
Sa Itte Miyo (2008)	Bring mich nach Hause (2010)

Singles from Bring mich nach Hause
- 1. "Alles" Released: 6 August 2010; 2. "Bring mich nach Hause" Released: 5 November 2010; 3. "Alles auf Anfang" Released: 25 February 2011

Bring mich nach Hause (English: Take Me Home) is the fourth studio album by the German band Wir sind Helden, released on 27 August 2010. It was preceded by the release of its first single, "Alles" on 20 August. On 21 August, Wir sind Helden began streaming their new album on their MySpace page. This led to the leak of the album the same day.

The band recorded Bring mich nach Hause during a three-month session in Tritonus Studio in Berlin starting with a month of rehearsing in February 2010. It was produced by Ian Davenport. For the first time in the history of the band the basic tracks were recorded live on magnetic tapes later to be digitalized for mastering with Pro Tools. Instead of synthesizers they used classic instruments like accordion, oud and banjo.

== Track listing ==
All tracks by Wir Sind Helden

No.	Title	Length
1.	"Alles"	4:24
2.	"Was uns beiden gehört"	3:04
3.	"Bring mich nach Hause"	5:05
4.	"Flucht in Ketten"	4:00
5.	"Die Ballade von Wolfgang und Brigitte"	4:45
6.	"Dramatiker"	3:28
7.	"23.55: Alles auf Anfang"	3:14
8.	"Die Träume anderer Leute"	4:00
9.	"Meine Freundin war im Koma und alles, was sie mir mitgebracht hat, war dieses lausige T-Shirt"	4:02
10.	"Kreise"	3:27
11.	"Im Auge des Sturms"	5:23
12.	"Nichts, was wir tun könnten"	3:18
Total length:		48:15

== Charts ==
=== Chart positions ===
Chart positions
GER	AUT	SWI	EUR
1	1	13	9

=== Year-end charts ===
Chart (2010)	Rank
German Albums Chart	71
