= Soundso =

Studio album by Wir Sind Helden
- Released: May 25, 2007
- Recorded: 2006–2007
- Genre: Pop rock
- Length: 45:43
- Labels: Labels Germany, EMI Music
- Producers: Patrik "El Pattino" Majer; Wir Sind Helden

Wir Sind Helden chronology
Wir Sind Helden (2007)	Soundso (2007)	Sa Itte Miyo (2008)

Singles from Soundso
- 1. "Endlich Ein Grund Zur Panik" Released: April 27, 2007; 2. "Soundso" Released: July 6, 2007; 3. "Kaputt" Released: November 9, 2007; 4. "Die Konkurrenz" Released: March 28, 2008

Professional ratings
Review scores
Source	Rating
Laut.de	4/5 stars
CDStarts.de	8/10 stars
Allmusic.com	2/5 stars

Soundso (English: So and So) is the third studio album by the German band Wir sind Helden. The first glimpse of this album could be caught when the band released the single "Endlich ein Grund zur Panik", which had a video clip featuring the band in superhero costumes. Before the album was released on 25 May 2007, a radio station from Munich played the whole album without permission, therefore revealing that the album was available as an illegal download before its release.

The first single, "Endlich ein Grund zur Panik", was featured on the soundtrack to FIFA 08.

== Track listing ==
=== Standard Edition ===
All tracks are written by Wir Sind Helden.

No.	Title	Length
1.	"(Ode) An Die Arbeit"	3:42
2.	"Die Konkurrenz"	3:44
3.	"Soundso"	4:14
4.	"Für Nichts Garantieren"	4:22
5.	"Kaputt"	3:08
6.	"Labyrinth"	4:14
7.	"The Geek (Shall Inherit)"	3:40
8.	"Endlich Ein Grund Zur Panik"	3:43
9.	"Der Krieg Kommt Schneller Zurück Als Du Denkst"	2:45
10.	"Hände Hoch"	4:36
11.	"Stiller"	4:21
12.	"Lass Uns Verschwinden"	4:14
Total length:		45:43

=== French Edition ===
A French edition was also issued with the addition of 3 French versions and a slight reordering of the tracks as follows:

No.	Title	Length
1.	"Panique" (French Version Of "Endlich Ein Grund Zur Panik")	3:43
2.	"Die Konkurrenz"	3:44
3.	"T’Es Comme Ça" (French Version Of "Soundso")	4:14
4.	"Für Nichts Garantieren"	4:22
5.	"K.O." (French Version Of "Kaputt")	3:08
6.	"Labyrinth"	4:14
7.	"The Geek (Shall Inherit)"	3:40
8.	"(Ode) An Die Arbeit"	3:42
9.	"Der Krieg Kommt Schneller Zurück Als Du Denkst"	2:45
10.	"Hände Hoch"	4:36
11.	"Stiller"	4:21
12.	"Lass Uns Verschwinden"	4:14
13.	"Endlich Ein Grund Zur Panik"	3:43
14.	"Soundso"	4:14
15.	"Kaputt"	3:08

== Chart performance ==
=== Album ===
Year	Album	Chart positions			
Year	Album	GER	AUT	SWI	
2007	Soundso: Formats: CD, digital download	2	2	11	GER: Gold (100.000+)

=== Year-end ===
Chart (2007)	Position
German Albums Chart	51

=== Singles ===
Year	Title	Chart positions	
Year	Title	GER	AUT
2007	"Endlich Ein Grund Zur Panik"	34	32
2007	"Soundso"	62	-
2007	"Kaputt"	69	-
2008	"Die Konkurrenz"	-	-
