= Die Reklamation =

Studio album by Wir Sind Helden
- Released: 7 July 2003
- Recorded: 2002–2003
- Genre: Pop; pop rock
- Length: 47:15
- Label: Labels; EMI
- Producer: Patrik "El Pattino" Majer; Wir Sind Helden

Wir Sind Helden chronology
Die Reklamation (2003)	Von Hier An Blind (2005)

Singles from Die Reklamation
- 1. "Guten Tag" Released: 3 February 2003; 2. "Müssen Nur Wollen" Released: 12 May 2003; 3. "Aurélie" Released: 15 September 2003; 4. "Denkmal" Released: 19 January 2004

Die Reklamation (German: The Complaint) is the debut studio album by German band Wir sind Helden, released on 7 July 2003 by Labels, a subsidiary of EMI. It sold over 800,000 copies in Germany and reached four times Platinum. The album follows lead singer Judith Holofernes' limited self-produced solo album Kamikazefliege, which had already included two tracks from this album: “Aurélie” and “Außer dir”.

== Critical reception ==
Professional ratings
Review scores
Source	Rating
Allmusic.com	4/5 stars
Laut.de	5/5 stars
Kulturnews.de	4/6 stars

The album was a success with the critics. laut.de gave it five out of five points calling it “the perfect soundtrack for an urban summer”. They describe the lyrics as “awesome and damn clever” and Judith Holofernes as “one of the most intelligent and funniest women of our time.” kulturnews.de also praised the lyrics and the originality of the album, calling Wir sind Helden worthy successors of Neue Deutsche Welle acts like Nena.

== Commercial performance ==
The album peaked at #2 on the German album chart, at #3 in Austria and at #38 in Switzerland. More than 800,000 copies of the album were sold in Germany alone and was awarded triple platinum. The album remains one of the most successful German albums ever (#19 based on chart position). It managed to stay in the German Albums Chart for a total of 94 weeks, making it the album, that stayed the longest time on that chart in their career

Four singles were released off the album: “Guten Tag”, “Müssen nur wollen”, “Aurélie” and “Denkmal”. In 2004, a new version of the album with a red cover called “Die rote Reklamation” (“The Red Complaint”) was released. This limited tour edition included the official video clips of all four singles and two short movies about the band.

== Awards ==
Wir sind Helden were awarded three ECHO awards in 2004 related to their debut album making them the most successful act of that year.

- Best Marketing (to EMI)
- Best national video clip (for “Müssen nur wollen”)
- Best national newcomer (Radio award)

== Track listing ==
All tracks written by Wir Sind Helden.

Die Reklamation – Standard edition
No.	Title	Length
1.	"Ist das so?"	3:04
2.	"Rüssel an Schwanz"	4:54
3.	"Guten Tag"	3:35
4.	"Denkmal"	3:17
5.	"Du erkennst mich nicht wieder"	4:56
6.	"Die Zeit heilt alle Wunder"	4:09
7.	"Monster"	3:48
8.	"Heldenzeit"	4:23
9.	"Aurélie"	3:33
10.	"Müssen nur wollen"	3:35
11.	"Außer dir"	3:41
12.	"Die Nacht"	4:20
13.	"Wir sind’s, Helden" (Bonus video)
Total length:		47:15

Die Reklamation – Limited tour edition bonus DVD
No.	Title	Length
1.	"Wir sind’s, Helden" (Extended)	-
2.	"Die Zeit heilt alle Wunder" (Short Music Video)	-
3.	"Guten Tag" (Music Video)	-
4.	"Müssen nur wollen" (Music Video)	-
5.	"Aurélie" (Music Video)	-
6.	"Denkmal" (Music Video)	-

== Charts ==
=== Weekly charts ===
Chart (2003)	Peak position
Austrian Albums (Ö3 Austria)	3
German Albums (Offizielle Top 100)	2
Swiss Albums (Schweizer Hitparade)	38

=== Year-end charts ===
Chart (2003)	Position
Austrian Albums (Ö3 Austria)	32
German Albums (Offizielle Top 100)	33
Chart (2004)	Position
Austrian Albums (Ö3 Austria)	11
German Albums (Offizielle Top 100)	4
