= Von hier an blind =

Studio album by Wir Sind Helden
- Released: 4 April 2005
- Recorded: 2003–2005
- Genres: Pop, pop rock
- Length: 48:08
- Labels: Labels Germany, EMI Music
- Producers: Patrik "El Pattino" Majer; Wir sind Helden

Wir Sind Helden chronology
Die Reklamation (2003)	Von hier an blind (2005)	Wir Sind Helden (2006)

Singles from Von hier an blind
- 1. "Gekommen um zu bleiben" Released: 28 February 2005; 2. "Nur ein wort" Released: 17 May 2005; 3. "Von hier an blind" Released: 26 September 2005; 4. "Wenn es passiert" Released: 13 January 2006

Professional ratings
Review scores
Source	Rating
Allmusic.de	2.5/5 stars
Intro	(Favorable)
Laut.de	4/5 stars
Plattentests Online	7/10 stars

Von hier an blind (German for Blind from here on) is the second album by Wir sind Helden, released on 4 April 2005 in Germany. The album entered the German top 100 album charts at #1 on 18 April and remained in the top 10 for twenty weeks. It also reached #1 in Austria, and #5 in Switzerland. The album also reached #16 on the iTunes' US album charts.

Four singles have been released from the album: "Gekommen um zu bleiben" (28 February 2005), "Nur ein Wort" (17 May 2005), "Von hier an blind" (26 September 2005) and "Wenn es passiert" (13 January 2006).

The CD's enhanced CD section features a couple of short videos from the production of the album.

Following the album's success in Germany and Austria, Wir sind Helden recorded several songs from the album in English, French and Japanese, for possible releases in non-German-speaking countries. "Sā Itte Miyō", a Japanese version of "Von hier an blind", was released as a B-side on the "Von hier an blind" single.

The entire artwork (cover, booklet, etc.) for the album as well as for the singles was designed by Berlin illustrator Vanessa Karr. It was modeled after parts from the comic book Tintin in Tibet (1960) by Belgian artist Hergé, who died in 1983. Notably, the video for the album's title single "Von hier an blind" is in the same style.

== Track listing ==
All songs were written by Wir sind Helden.

No.	Title	Length
1.	"Wenn es passiert"	3:33
2.	"Echolot"	4:31
3.	"Von hier an blind"	3:30
4.	"Zuhälter"	3:30
5.	"Ein Elefant für dich"	4:42
6.	"Darf ich das behalten"	3:18
7.	"Wütend genug"	4:29
8.	"Geht auseinander"	3:10
9.	"Zieh dir was an"	3:26
10.	"Gekommen um zu bleiben"	3:10
11.	"Nur ein Wort"	3:56
12.	"Ich werde mein Leben lang üben, dich so zu lieben, wie ich dich lieben will, wenn du gehst"	2:52
13.	"Bist du nicht müde"	3:53
Total length:		48:08

== Limited Edition ==
The album was also released in a limited edition, which included an additional DVD with a documentary, interviews with the band members about each of the album's songs, and a game where one can switch the band's instruments on a performance of "Nur ein Wort".

== Charts ==
=== Weekly charts ===
Chart (2005–06)	Peak position
Austrian Albums (Ö3 Austria)	1
Dutch Albums (Album Top 100)	72
German Albums (Offizielle Top 100)	1
Swiss Albums (Schweizer Hitparade)	5

=== Year-end charts ===
Chart (2005)	Position
Austrian Albums (Ö3 Austria)	5
German Albums (Offizielle Top 100)	2
Swiss Albums (Schweizer Hitparade)	97

Chart (2006)	Position
German Albums (Offizielle Top 100)	98
