= Moritz Krämer =

German singer songwriter

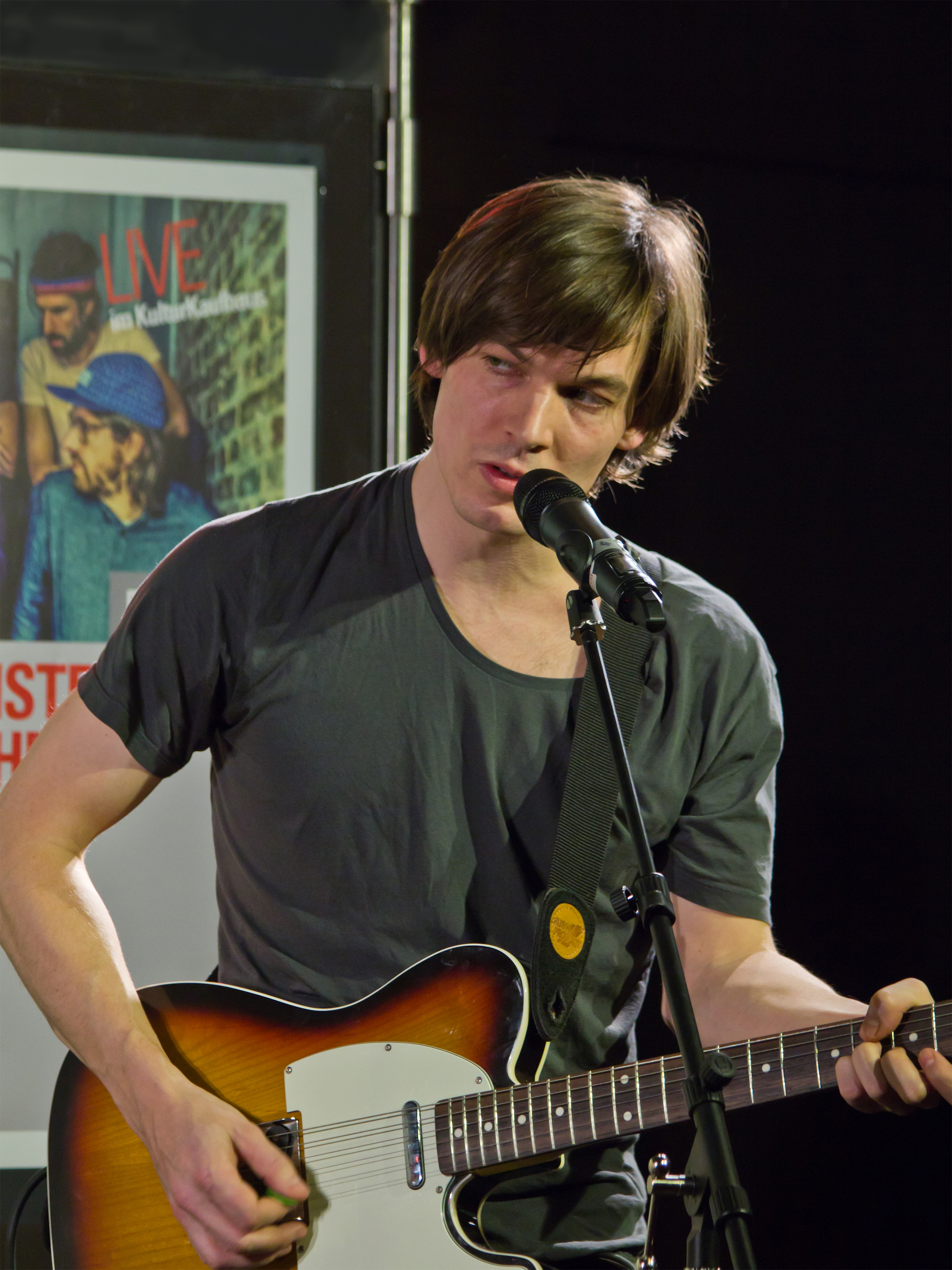

Background information
- Origin: Basel, Switzerland
- Genres: Indie Rock; Krautrock; Alternative
- Years active: 2006-present
- Labels: Tapete Records
- Members: Moritz Krämer

Moritz Krämer (born 1980 in Basel) is a Swiss indie singer songwriter from Basel who lives in Berlin.

== History ==
Krämer was born in Switzerland and grew up in southern Bavaria. After graduating from high school in Freiburg, he moved to Berlin. He holds a degree in the subjects of video and language at the Berlin University of the Arts. Krämer worked in Berlin as a composer, lyricist and musical director at various theaters, including the popular stage, Hebbel am Ufer, and the Maxim Gorki Theater.

In 2010, Krämer won the TV Noir rocket. Krämer released his debut EP on 1 August 2011, which contains acoustic songs, from earlier that year. In 2010 he played the opening act on the tour of The Young Gods His first album, "Wir Können Nix Dafur" was produced by Krämer, and released on 4 March 2011 through Tapete Records.

== Personal life ==
Krämer has shot some music videos and short films. His first film was the short film Tsuri Tsumi. In 2009, he was the main actor of the song recital Night of the Nerds at the Central Theater in Leipzig.

== Discography ==
=== Extended plays ===
- Ich Kann Nix Dafur (2010)

=== Studio albums ===
- Wir Können Nix Dafur (2011)
- Ich hab einen Vertrag unterschrieben 1 (2018)
- Ich hab einen Vertrag unterschrieben 2 (2019)
- Die traurigen Hummer (2021)
