= List of German musicians =

This is a list of German musicians and bands.

== A ==
- Abor & Tynna
- Accept
- Agitation Free
- Amon Düül II
- Lale Andersen
- Apparat (Sascha Ring)
- Apache 207
- AnnenMayKantereit
- Georg Amft
- Avantasia

Back to top

== B ==
- Kristina Bach
- Bad Boys Blue
- Bad Temper Joe
- Bruno Balz
- BAP
- Blixa Bargeld
- Gracia Baur
- Beatsteaks
- Anni Becker
- Lou Bega
- Tim Bendzko
- BeNuts
- Andrea Berg
- Bethlehem
- Jeanette Biedermann
- Cinema Bizarre
- Roy Black
- Blind Guardian
- Blue System
- Dieter Bohlen
- Boney M.
- Bonez MC
- Bonfire
- Andreas Bourani
- Michael Bredl
- Fettes Brot
- Wighnomy Brothers
- Inge Brück
- Heidi Brühl
- Hans-Jürgen Buchner, head of Haindling
- Bushido

Back to top

== C ==
- C418
- Camouflage
- Can
- Cascada
- Yvonne Catterfeld
- Milky Chance
- Alex Christensen
- Roger Cicero
- Cluster
- Sarah Connor
- Contact Trio
- Javier Corcobado
- Corvus Corax
- Michael Cretu
- Cro

Back to top

== D ==
- Dark Fortress
- Das Ich
- Shirin David
- Nino de Angelo
- Pauline Decker
- Defeated Sanity
- Franz Josef Degenhardt
- Jan Delay
- Samy Deluxe
- Kurt Demmler
- Anna Depenbusch
- Destruction
- Drafi Deutscher
- Marlene Dietrich
- Ben Dolic
- Herbert Dreilich, singer of Karat
- Jürgen Drews
- Dschinghis Khan
- Ann-Sophie Dürmeyer

Back to top

== E ==
- Goby Eberhardt
- Katja Ebstein
- Echt
- Edguy
- Eisbrecher
- Eisregen
- Elaiza
- Sarah Engels
- Enigma
- Margot Eskens
- Electric Callboy
- Elif Demirezer
- Equilibrium
- Margot Eskens
- Extrabreit
- Exumer

Back to top

== F ==
- Harold Faltermeyer
- Die Fantastischen Vier (Michael Beck, Thomas Dürr, Michael B. Schmidt, Andreas Rieke)
- Cee Farrow
- Faust
- Fehlfarben
- Deutsch-Österreichisches Feingefühl
- Fex (band)
- Fifty50
- Finsterforst
- Helene Fischer
- Joy Fleming
- Fler
- Fleshcrawl
- Fools Garden
- Mark Forster
- Eko Fresh
- FSK
- Fuckin Wild
- Fury in the Slaughterhouse

Back to top

== G ==
- Gamma Ray
- Giant Rooks
- Gunter Gabriel
- Gestört aber GeiL
- Carmen Geutjes
- Rex Gildo
- Dero Goi
- Grave Digger
- Gravestone
- Sabine Grofmeier
- Herbert Grönemeyer
- Gertrud Grunow
- Isaak Guderian

Back to top

== H ==
- Nina Hagen
- Hanne Haller
- Gitte Hænning
- Malik Harris
- H-Blockx
- Heaven Shall Burn
- Heino
- Helloween
- Guido Henneböhl
- Stefanie Hertel
- Margot Hielscher
- Hoffmann & Hoffmann
- Louise Hoffner
- Michael Holm
- Wyn Hoop
- Guildo Horn
- Die toten Hosen (Andreas Frege)
- Annette Humpe

Back to top

== I ==
- Ideal
- Ikkimel
- In Extremo
- Iron Angel
- Iron Savior

Back to top

== J ==
- Satin Jackets
- Jamule
- Jenson McKenzie
- Juli (Eva Briegel)
- Claudia Jung
- Andrea Jürgens
- Jürgen Hart

Back to top

== K ==
- Kai Hansen
- Roland Kaiser
- Paul Kalkbrenner
- Karat
- Chris Kempers
- Kessler Twins
- Kilians
- Kira
- Alexander Klaws
- KMFDM
- Hildegard Knef
- Christoph Koncz
- Daniel Kovac
- Kraftklub
- Kraftwerk
- George Kranz
- Peter Kraus
- Kreator
- Jamie-Lee Kriewitz
- Richard Kruspe
- Daniel Küblböck
- Paul Kuhn
- Heinz Rudolf Kunze

Back to top

== L ==
- La Bouche
- Klaus Lage
- Paul Landers
- Oscar Loya
- Le Click
- Leaves' Eyes
- Ute Lemper
- Les Humphries Singers
- Levina
- Till Lindemann
- Udo Lindenberg
- Patrick Lindner
- Roman Lob
- Lord of the Lost
- Christian Lorenz
- Lucilectric
- Hannfried Lucke
- Karl-Hermann Lüer

Back to top

== M ==
- Michael Kiske
- Madsen
- Peter Maffay
- Siw Malmkvist
- Jürgen Marcus
- Mike Mareen
- Marteria
- Corinna May
- Noah McBeth aka NoMBe
- Penny McLean
- Mark Medlock
- Megaherz
- Frl. Menke
- Reinhard Mey
- Lena Meyer-Landrut
- MIA.
- Michelle
- Wolfgang Michels
- Milhaven
- Milli Vanilli
- Modern Talking
- Modeselektor
- Morgoth
- Werner Müller
- Münchener Freiheit
- Marius Müller-Westernhagen
- Münchener Freiheit
- Max Mutzke
- Wenche Myhre
- Mystic Circle
- Mystic Prophecy

Back to top

== N ==
- Xavier Naidoo
- Nargaroth
- Necrophagist
- Julia Neigel
- Nena
- Einstürzende Neubauten
- Nimo (rapper)
- No Angels
- NoMBe
- Not Profane
- Klaus Nomi
- Astrid North
- The Notwist
- Nora Nova

Back to top

== O ==
- Obscura
- Oomph!
- Overground

Back to top

== P ==
- Panik
- Paradox
- Paragon
- Mille Petrozza
- Doro Pesch
- Ingrid Peters
- Kim Petras
- Wolfgang Petry
- Polarkreis 18
- Powerwolf note: also Romanian
- Primal Fear
- Die Prinzen
- PUR

Back to top

== Q ==
- Freddy Quinn

Back to top

== R ==
- Stefan Raab
- Max Raabe
- Rammstein
- Real McCoy
- Rebellion
- Achim Reichel
- Matthias Reim
- Rio Reiser
- Revolverheld
- Oliver Riedel
- Mary Roos
- Marianne Rosenberg
- Rosenstolz
- Anneliese Rothenberger
- Robin Schulz
- Running Wild

Back to top

== S ==
- Aneta Sablik
- Sacred Steel
- Saltatio Mortis
- Sandra
- Kool Savas
- Schiller
- Peter Schilling
- Christoph Schneider
- Michael Schulte
- Robin Schulz
- Walter Andreas Schwarz
- Scooter (H. P. Baxxter)
- Scorpions
- Nicole Seibert
- Selig
- Shamall
- The Shanes
- Ireen Sheer
- Bianca Shomburg
- Sido
- Jendrik Sigwart
- Silbermond
- Silent Circle
- Silicon Dream (1987–1995)
- Silver Convention
- Sinner
- Ski Aggu
- Slapp Happy
- Sodom
- Sotiria
- Spider Murphy Gang
- Sportfreunde Stiller
- Stormwarrior
- Stormwitch
- Christina Stürmer
- Geier Sturzflug
- Subway to Sally
- Symphorce

Back to top

== T ==
- Tangerine Dream
- Tankard
- Tanzwut
- Adel Tawil
- Texas Lightning
- Tic Tac Toe
- Tokio Hotel
- Trio

Back to top

== U ==
- U96
- Unheilig
- Unisonic
- Unterbiberger Hofmusik
- Farin Urlaub (Die Ärzte)

Back to top

== V ==
- Lena Valaitis
- Virtual Riot

Back to top

== W ==
- Hannes Wader
- Stefan Waggershausen
- Warlock
- Konstantin Wecker
- Zoe Wees
- Welle:Erdball
- Ilse Werner
- Paul Weschke
- Ulla Wiesner
- Wind
- Wir Sind Helden
- Joachim Witt
- WizTheMc
- Wolfchant

Back to top

== X ==
Back to top

== Y ==
- YOUNOTUS

Back to top

== Z ==
- Zah1de
- Zedd

Back to top

== See also ==
- List of Germans
- List of hip-hop musicians
- Lists of musicians
- Music of Germany
- Category:German musicians
