= Keepin' It Real =

Keepin' It Real or Keeping It Real may refer to:

In music:

- Keepin It Real (Camoflauge album)
- Keepin' It Real (Craig's Brother album)
- Keepin' It Real (25 ta Life album), an album by 25 ta Life
- Keepin' It Real (C-Block album), an album by C-Block

In other media:

- Keeping It Real (novel), a novel by Justina Robson
- Keepin' It Real with Al Sharpton, a radio talk show
- Keepin' It Real (film), a 2001 film directed by Brian Cox

== See also ==
- "Keepin' It Reel", an episode of Happy Tree Friends
- Keepin' it REAL, a drug abuse prevention program used by Drug Abuse Resistance Education
- Keep It Real (disambiguation)
