= Günther Sigl =

German rock musician

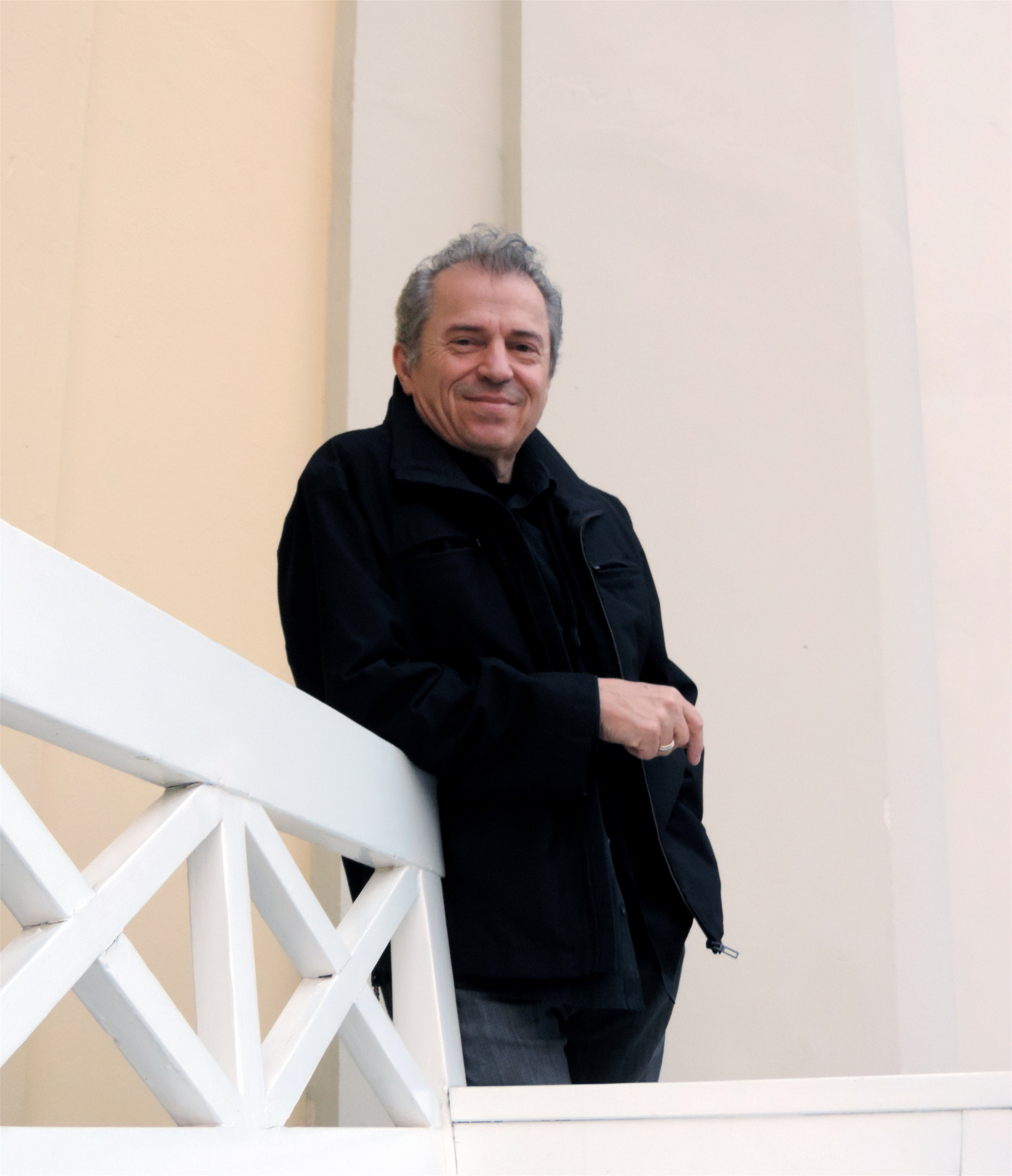
- Sigl in 2014

Background information
- Born: 8 February 1947 (age 79); Schongau, US-occupied Germany
- Origin: German
- Genres: Rock
- Occupations: Composer; Lyricist; Musician
- Instruments: Vocals; bass; guitar; ukulele
- Member of: Spider Murphy Gang
- Formerly of: Stummick; The Wavebreakers
- Spouse: Doris Sigl

Günther Sigl (German: [ˈɡʏntɐ ˈzi:ɡl̩]; born 8 February 1947) is a German composer, lyricist and musician. He is co-founder of the Spider Murphy Gang and he sings and plays bass guitar for the band.

== Early life ==
Sigl was born in 1947 in Schongau, Upper Bavaria, at the time of Allied occupation in the wake of World War II (Schongau lay in the American zone). He moved with his parents to Landsberg am Lech, where he began school in 1953, and then in 1958 he moved on to Karlsruhe, where he went to the trade school. At the age of 15, he got his first guitar. Beginning in 1964, he underwent training as a bank teller. It was in this time that Sigl discovered his passion for music, sang and played archtop guitar in the beat band "The Wavebreakers", with whom he appeared at, among other venues, Hamburg's Star-Club, which earned him a certain amount of credibility elsewhere in the German music scene.

== Career ==
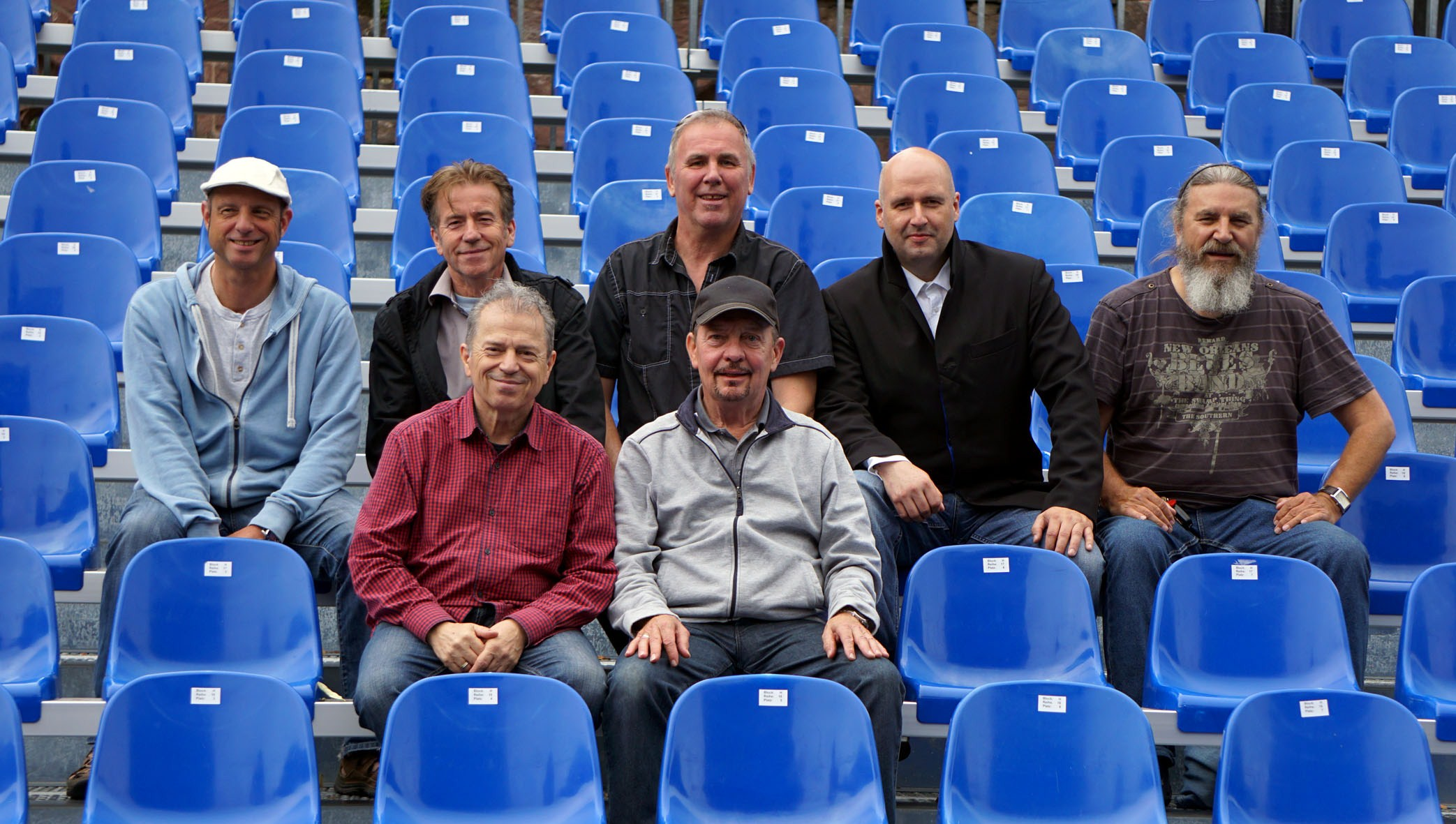
Spider Murphy Gang (2016)

In 1968, soon after finishing his bank training, he moved to Munich. After military service (1968–1969), he took up a job at the Münchner Bank, which he kept until 1973.

When he decided to become a professional musician in 1971, he eventually gave up his fulltime job and toured together with Fritz Haberstumpf, Barny Murphy, Willi Augustin and Franz Trojan as "Stummick" at many clubs at American military bases in southern Germany.

After Haberstumpf left the band, Sigl and the others, along with Michael Busse, formed the Spider Murphy Gang. Sigl has written both the music and the lyrics to most of that band's songs. He is also the band's lead singer. In 1981, Sigl wrote what would turn out to be the band's only chart-topper: Skandal im Sperrbezirk. The song was number one on the charts for eight weeks. It was inspired by a "cleanup" campaign in Munich in the runup to the 1972 Summer Olympics to be held in that city, as a result of which the city's sex workers were no longer welcome to ply their trade in the city centre, and were banished to the city's far-flung neighbourhoods, creating a zone in the city centre where they were forbidden to tread while practising their profession — the Sperrbezirk. This struck Sigl as hypocritical. In a 2017 interview with Der Spiegel, Sigl was asked about this:

Ich dachte: Aha, Bier saufen bis zur Besinnungslosigkeit ist in München in Ordnung — aber käufliche Liebe, das geht nicht. Das ist Doppelmoral.
(I thought: Aha, swilling beer to the point of unconsciousness is all right in Munich — but buying love, that's not on. That's a double standard.)

Together with record producer Harald Steinhauer and music manager Jürgen Thürnau, Sigl founded Munich's Mambo Musikverlag, a musical publishing house, which today belongs to Sony Music. Mambo had under contract such acts as Sandra, Hubert Kah, Münchener Freiheit and Geier Sturzflug.

A guest acting role was given Sigl in 1985 in the comedy film Der Formel Eins Film, in which he played an assistant who bore something of a likeness to Prince.

As a composer, lyricist and singer, he took part in various musical productions, along with, among others, Nicki in 1985 (he wrote Warum schaust du mi den o and Weil i immer no an Engerl glaub for her, together with Harald Steinhauer and Helmut Frey), Ludwig Seuss in 1991 ("I'm Ready" on the album "Marilyn Sessions"), Hubert Treml in 2006 (in a duet with him with the group b.o.s.s., "Elvis von Schwabing" on the album "Elvis lebt in Untergrammelsdorf") and the hip hop band Blumentopf in 2012.

=== Günther Sigl & Band ===
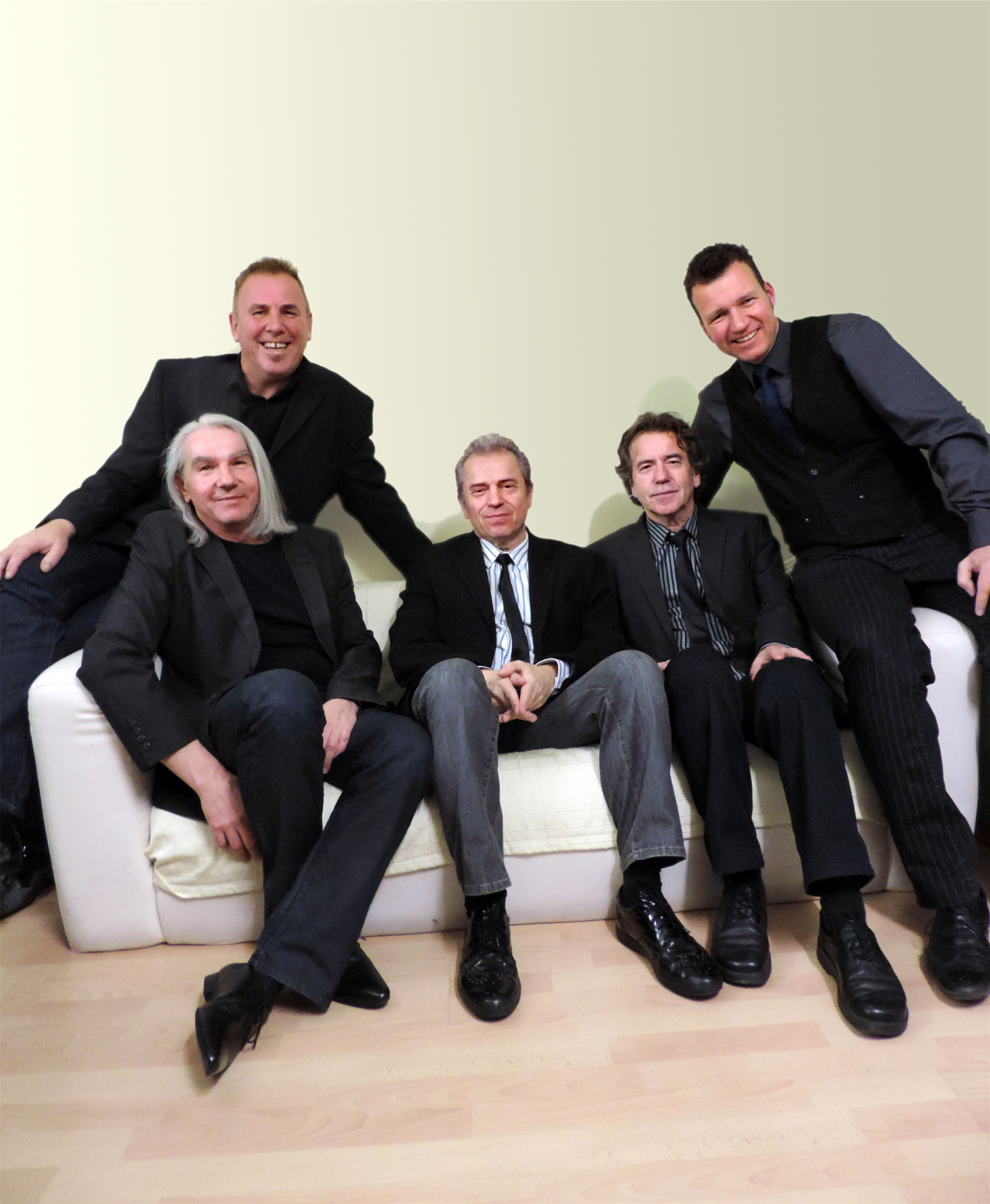
Günther Sigl & Band

Sigl's first solo CD, Habe die Ehre, came out in 2010.

His band is made up of Willie Duncan (lead guitar, lap steel guitar, mandolin, vocals), Dieter Radig (percussion, vocals), Wolfgang Götz (keyboards, accordion, vocals) and beginning in 2015 Robert Gorzawsky on the drums. The band's sound is quite different from the Spider Murphy Gang's, with baritone guitars and bass guitars being heard only sporadically (even Sigl himself often plays baritone guitar rather than bass). The music has been described as a "colourful mixture of boogie-woogie – Western swing – blues – rock and roll – ska – chanson and old Schlagers.

Günther Sigl & Band have played at, among other venues, the "Lustspielhaus München", the "Dehnberger Hof Theater", the Stadttheater Landsberg and the "NUTS Kulturfabrik Traunstein".

== Personal life ==
In his private life, Sigl is interested in Impressionist and Expressionist painting, and is also passionate about playing the ukulele.

Sigl has two children, Philipp (b. 1982) and Anna (b. 1984) as well as a grandson named Paul (b. 2020).

On 1 September 2023, at the age of 76, he married his longtime girlfriend Doris (née Furtmair).

== Awards ==
- 2018: Kulturpreis Bayern (Bavarian Cultural Prize)
- 2019: Bavarian Order of Merit
