= Honold =

Honold is a surname. Notable people with the surname include:

- Abby Honold, American rape victim
- Gottlob Honold (1876–1923), German engineer
- Rochus Honold, German musician, a member of Fuckin Wild
