= General population =

General population refers to the public. It may also refer to:

- General population (prison) ("gen pop" for short) – the group of inmates who are not given any specific treatment
- General Population (album), a 1997 album by C-Block
- General Population (Mauritius)
