= Metro Theatre (Toronto) =

Former cinema in Toronto, Ontario, Canada

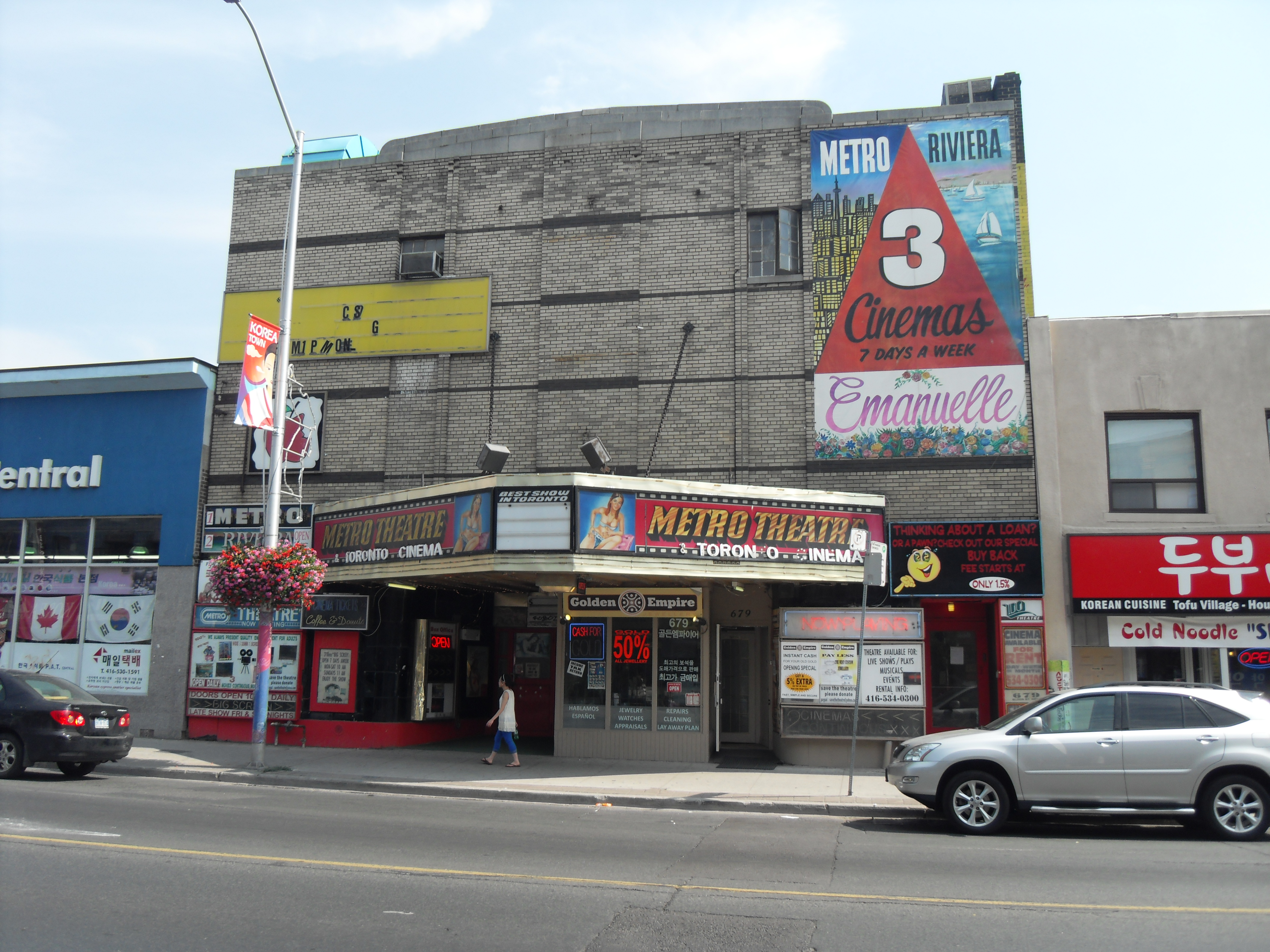
Metro Theatre in 2011

The Metro Theatre was an adult movie theatre in Toronto, Ontario, Canada. Located at 677 Bloor Street, it was open ten hours a day throughout the entire week before its closure in 2013. Built in 1938, it is one of the several Art Deco theatres built in Toronto in the 1930s by architects Kaplan & Sprachman. Metro Theatre opened in 1939 as a neighbourhood theatre showing second run films and B movies and in 1976 started to show adult films. The theatre is stylized for the 1940s, one of its screening rooms had 286 seats and another 320, there is also a snack bar. The entrance contained signed photos of notable pornographic stars, including Ron Jeremy.

In the 1990s, Metro Theatre was used to screen kung-fu films and as a counter-culture performance space. Metro Theatre is featured prominently in scenes in the 2008 film The Lollipop Generation by G. B. Jones, and also briefly in the music video for "So Strung Out" by C-Block.

The theatre closed at the end of 2013 after being purchased for million by a numbered company directed by Saroj Jain. The building was partitioned to create two commercial spaces: a large indoor area where the theatre used to be, which houses an indoor rock climbing gym and a smaller retail storefront facing Bloor.
