= Down Low (rap group) =

German rap group

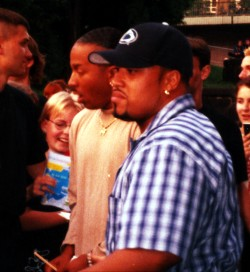
- Down Low on 16 July 1999, shortly before their concert in Dresden, Germany

Background information
- Origin: Kaiserslautern, Germany
- Genres: Hip hop Rap
- Years active: 1995–present
- Label: K-Town
- Members: Joe Thompson; Mike Dalien
- Past members: Darren Tucker; Eric Lamont Smith

Down Low is a rap group formed in Kaiserslautern, Germany, in 1995 fronted by Americans Joe Thompson and Darren Tucker. Mike Dalien joined the group in 1996 since Joe and Darren had decided to goThe group is known for hits like "Johnny B." Down Low are considered as one of the first groups to bring hip-hop music in a European style in the middle of the 1990s together with artists such as C-Block, Nana and A.K. – S.W.I.F.T.

== History ==
The group was formed in December 1995 in the K-Town studios in Kaiserslautern. The members were American rapper Joe Thompson, who served in the U.S. Army during Operation Desert Storm and had a friendship with Rod. D from Fun Factory, as well as singer and fellow American Darren Tucker. The first single "Don't Look Any Further", a hip-hop version of the song of the same name of the M People received no attention; the second song "Vision of Life", however, became a hit in several European countries in the middle of 1996.

Shortly after the publication of "Vision of Life", Tucker had to leave the group due to disputes with his manager. He was replaced by Mike Dalien. The album Visions and the singles "Murder" over the case of O. J. Simpson, "Potion" and "Lovething/We Do It Like That" followed soon. Together with Flip Da Scrip, the group produced the song "Nothing Like Viva" as a hymn on the German music-television channel VIVA under the project name Hip Hop Alliance.

A second album, It Ain't Over, followed at the end of 1997. The song "Johnny B.", a cover version of The Hooters, became the group's largest hit and climbed to number four in the German single charts. Radio NRJ distinguished Down Low as the best rap act in 1997. Following their success with singles in the European market they released a compilation album titled "Moonlight" (1977), which received a platinum certification in Italy, compared to their single "Once Upon a Time" (1988) which received a gold certification.

In the spring of 1998, the group created Rapper Against Racism in order to promote talented new singers and rappers (La Mazz, Trooper Da Don, Jay Supreme and others) and point a spot on racism still present in Germany at that time. In the autumn of 1998 the group released the album Third Dimension. The single "Once Upon A Time" could tie to past successes; the probably saddest song of the group contained elements from the music by Ennio Morricone for the epic spaghetti-Western film Once Upon a Time in the West (1968). With the song "H.I.V.", one drew the attention of the dangers of the AIDS virus.

After the publication of a greatest-hits album, the group took a break for 1 1/2 years. In 2001, the fourth album, The 4th Level, which was clearly an R&B-album, was released. Dalien left the group because of musical differences in 2001 at the beginning of the work on The 4th Level. His successor became Erick "Rick" Lamont Smith, who had already co-operated in the past with the group and had published some singles under the name La Mazz and Dressman. Since the German public had lost the interest in European rap in the meantime, the group could celebrate no further success in Germany. In 2002, the record company published a remix of Murder with samples of the rapper Warren G.

In 2003, the group released a DVD, Visions – The Singles 1997–2003. Shortly thereafter, Mike Dalien left the group and was replaced by Eric Lamont Smith. In the autumn of 2003, the single "Living in the Ghetto" appeared. The publication was, however, a single-handed attempt of the record company; the artists experienced only later of it, and for the lack of promotion the song found no commercial attention, but nevertheless became a club hit. Thompson accused SHIFT Music later of cannibalizing the group from money scarcities.

For 2004, an album, Down Low V / Adrenaline, was announced. But since the new style of the group did not please the record company, the album was not published. For a while it looked like as if the artists would possibly close a contract with a new label in the United States, for legal reasons probably under a new project name. However, in April 2005 Thompson announced that the group had settled the controversy with SHIFT and would work on new material again. The first song "Every Day (MMMM)" of the album Return of The Trendsetter was released 27 October 2006.

In June 2010, Dalien rejoined the group and Eric Smith left.

On 23 May 2014, Down Low released their comeback single "Friday Night".

== Discography ==
=== Studio albums ===
Title	Album details	Peak chart positions			
Title	Album details	GER	AUT	FIN	ITA
Visions	Released: 14 October 1996; Label: Shift, (ZYX); Formats: CD, Cassette	77	—	—	—
It Ain't Over	Released: 24 November 1997; Label: Shift, (ZYX); Formats: CD, Cassette	37	47	9	—
Third Dimension	Released: 16 November 1998; Label: Shift, (ZYX); Formats: CD, Cassette	84	—	—	—
Moonlight (released in Italy only)	Released: March, 1999; Label: Baby/RTI; Formats: CD, Cassette	—	—	—	5
The 4th Level	Released: 2 April 2001; Label: Shift, (ZYX); Formats: CD, Cassette	—	—	—	—
Return of the Trendsetter	Released: 27 October 2006; Label: Shift, (ZYX); Formats: CD	—	—	—	—
"—" denotes items which were not released in that country or failed to chart.

=== Compilation albums ===
Title	Album details	Peak chart positions			
Title	Album details	GER	AUT	FIN	ITA
Best Of	Released: 26 July 1999; Label: Shift, (ZYX); Formats: CD	—	—	—	—
Visions: Best of the Singles 1997-2003	Released: 3 March 2003; Label: ZYX; Formats: CD	—	—	—	—
"—" denotes items which were not released in that country or failed to chart.

=== Singles ===
Title	Year	Peak chart positions							Album
Title	Year	GER	AUT	FIN	FRA	ITA	SWE	SWI	Album
"Vision of Life"	1996	19	—	—	10	—	—	—	Visions
"Murder"	1996	25	—	—	—	—	—	38	Visions
"Nothing Like Viva" Hip Hop Alliance (featuring Down Low and Flip Da Scrip)	1996	91	—	—	—	—	—	46	Visions
"Potion"	1997	37	—	—	—	—	—	—	Visions
"Lovething"	1997	82	—	—	—	—	—	—	It Ain't Over
"Moonlight"	1997	35	—	—	—	—	—	—	It Ain't Over
"Johnny B."	1997	4	13	7	33	—	14	8	It Ain't Over
"Hit Me Right"	1998	95	—	—	—	—	—	—	It Ain't Over
"Once Upon a Time"	1998	4	7	—	26	6	—	6	Third Dimension
"H.I.V."	1999	53	—	—	—	—	—	—	Third Dimension
"So Long Goodbye"	1999	64	—	—	—	—	—	49	Third Dimension
"Don't You"	2001	99	—	—	—	—	—	—	The 4th Level
"Murder 2002" Down Low (featuring Warren G.)	2002	—	—	—	—	—	—	—	Non-album single
"Africa"	2007	—	—	—	—	—	—	—	Return of the Trendsetter
"Friday Night"	2014	—	—	—	—	—	—	—	Non-album single
"Party Like a Freak" Cassey Doreen (featuring Down Low)	2014	—	—	—	—	—	—	—	Non-album single
"Fields of Gold"	2017	—	—	—	—	—	—	—	Non-album single
"—" denotes items which were not released in that country or failed to chart.

=== Other singles ===
Title	Year	Peak chart positions		Album
Title	Year	GER	AUT	Album
"I Want to Know What Love Is" (Rappers Against Racism, featuring Down Low, La Mazz and Scream Factory)^{[Notes]}	1998	36	20	The Message

Notes The track is from the album The Message by Rappers Against Racism.

=== DVDs ===
2003

- Visions – The Singles 1997–2003

== See also ==
- List of German musicians
- List of hip-hop musicians
