= Keep It Real =

Keep It Real may refer to:

- "Keep It Real" (Jamal song)
- "Keep It Real" (Miilkbone song)
- "Keep It Real", a song by B.G. & the Chopper City Boyz from Life in the Concrete Jungle
- "Keep It Real", a song by the Jonas Brothers from Lines, Vines and Trying Times
- "Keep It Real", a song by MC Ren from The Villain in Black
- Keep It Real: Everything You Need to Know About Researching and Writing Creative Nonfiction, a book edited by Lee Gutkind

== See also ==
- Keepin' It Real (disambiguation)
