= Margarete Luise Schick =

German operatic soprano (1773–1809)

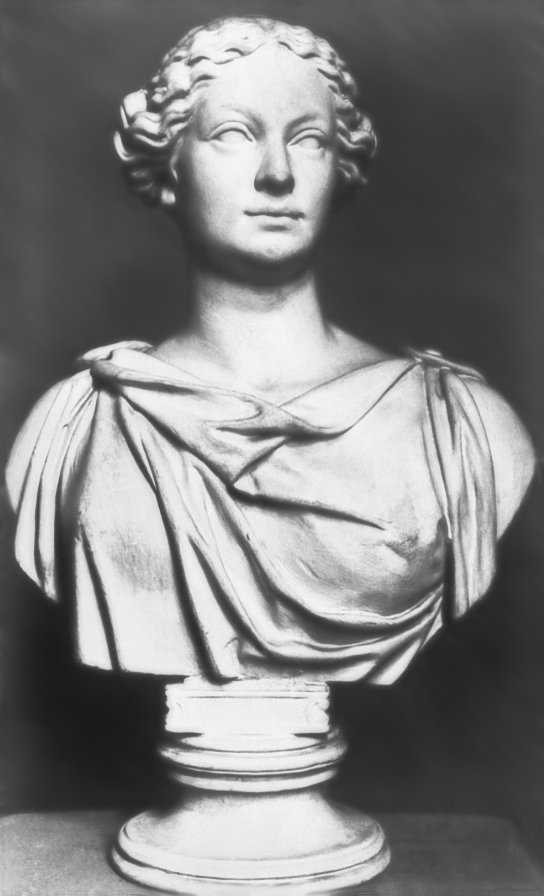
- Bust by Ludwig Wilhelm Wichmann, 1809
- Born: Margarete Luise Hamel; 26 April 1773; Mainz, Germany
- Died: 29 April 1809 (aged 36); Berlin
- Occupation: Operatic soprano
- Organizations: Berlin Royal Opera

Margarete Luise Schick (née Hamel; 26 April 1773 – 29 April 1809) was a German operatic soprano. A member of the Royal Opera Berlin, she was known for interpreting leading roles in operas by Gluck, singing in German with precise diction, and acting convincingly. She was a soloist at the coronation of Leopold II, with Mozart conducting.

== Career ==
Born Margarete Luise Hamel in Mainz, she was the daughter of the bassoonist Johann Nepomuk Hamel (1728–1792), who played for the elector Friedrich Karl Joseph von Erthal. Her mother was Juliana Keller (born 1745). Her father gave her piano lessons from age six, and the singer and voice teacher Franziska Hellmuth trained her voice early. At age ten, she moved to Würzburg to study with Stephan, sponsored by the elector. She made her stage debut in Mainz in 1788 in the title role of Lilla, a singspiel by Vicente Martín y Soler, with Vincenzo Righini conducting, the leader of the Kurfürstliches Orchester from 1785 to 1793.

She was a soloist for the coronation of Leopold II in Frankfurt in 1790; she performed in the Krönungsmess (Coronation Mass) by Righini, and in a concert conducted by Wolfgang Amadeus Mozart. She married Ernst Johann Christoph Schick, the concert master of the Kurmainzische Kapelle who was also a composer. She appeared as Zerlina in the first German performance of Mozart's Don Giovanni on 13 March 1789 in Mainz, repeated on 3 May in Frankfurt, with Carl David Stegmann in the title role.

She was engaged in 1793 at the Royal Opera Berlin. She appeared in operas by Mozart and Gluck, and was regarded as one of the leading singers in German of her era. Singing in German with precise diction, she was particularly praised for her acting; for the title role of Gluck's Iphigenie auf Tauris, she was prepared by August Wilhelm Iffland.

Among her roles were Myrrha in Winter's Opferfest in 1979, Antigone in Sacchini's Oedipus, in 1799 the title role in Piccini's Didon, in 1801 Vitellia in Mozart's Titus, in 1802 the Countess in his Figaro, in 1805 the title role in Gluck's Armide, in 1808 a title role in his Orpheus and Eurydice, and Malvina in Méhul's Uthal). Bernhard Anselm Weber composed for her the monodrama Hero in 1800 and the duodrama Solmalle in 1802.

Pauline Decker (1811–1882), a noted opera singer (soprano) and composer, was her granddaughter.

She died in Berlin, and was buried on 3 May 1810 at the cemetery of the Berlin Cathedral.
