= I Represent =

Studio album by Camoflauge
- Released: June 6, 2000
- Recorded: 2000
- Genre: Gangsta rap, Southern hip-hop
- Label: Pure Pain / R&D

Camoflauge chronology
I Represent (2000)	Strictly 4 da Streets: Drugs Sex and Violence, Vol. 1 (2001)

I Represent is the first solo album by American rapper Camoflauge. Following this album's release, Camoflauge went on to produce two more albums before his murder.

== Track listing ==
1. GA (Intro) (Prod. by G. Cope)
2. Weeded Out Lyrics (Prod. by Fat Boy)
3. Bring Da Pain (Feat. G. Datts) (Prod. by G. Cope)
4. I Represent (Prod. by G. Cope)
5. Head Bustin (Prod. by Dushawn)
6. Like You Badd (Feat. L.Douglass, N.Holsey, D.Lockhart) (Prod. by Fat Boy)
7. Let's Get 'Em (Feat. M.Harris)
8. Let's Ride
9. 17 Shots
10. Do What I Gotta
11. No Love
12. Things Gonna Get Better
13. Playa
14. From Da South
15. Love Da Way You Do Dat
16. Y'all Don't Want No Drama
17. Nigga What
18. Da Click
