= Camoflauge =

American rapper (1981–2003)

Background information
- Born: Jason Akeil Johnson; December 9, 1981; Savannah, Georgia, U.S.
- Died: May 19, 2003 (aged 21) Savannah, Georgia, U.S.
- Genres: Hip hop, gangsta rap
- Occupation: Rapper
- Years active: 1999–2003
- Labels: Universal Records, Pure Pain Records

Jason Akeil Johnson (December 9, 1981 – May 19, 2003), also known as Camoflauge, was an American rapper, recognized for his songs "Cut Friends" and "Laying My Stunt Down". He released his final album Keepin It Real in 2002.

Camoflauge was murdered in Savannah, Georgia, by gunfire outside of Pure Pain Records recording studio while he was walking with his toddler son.

== Career ==
In 1999, Johnson along with the rap group Crime Affiliates independently released the collaboration album, Crime Pays. The following year, Johnson released his debut solo album, I Represent, which peaked at No. 58 on the Billboard R&B/Hip-Hop Album Chart and led to a solo recording deal with Universal Records for his sophomore album, Strictly 4 Da Streets: Sex, Drugs and Violence Vol.1; however, Johnson was subsequently dropped by the label after its release. His songs often contain references to life on the streets of Savannah.

Johnson's third album, Keeping It Real debuted at No. 24 on the Billboard Top Independent Albums, No. 26 on the Billboard Heatseekers Charts, and No. 39 on the Top R&B/Hip-Hop Albums. The album was released in 2003 through the independent label Pure Pain. As Johnson's celebrity status grew, he was invited to speak at high schools in the Savannah area. Johnson delivered Christmas gifts to children living in public housing, dressed as what he called "Camo Claus" and was an honored guest at a Father's Day celebration in his hometown.

The music video for his single "Cut Friends" has garnered over 2.8 million views on YouTube..

On January 27, 2025, a DJ employed by the University of South Carolina athletic department was suspended after playing "Cut Friends" after their women's basketball team won a game against the LSU Lady Tigers, the team of Johnson's daughter, Flau'jae. The athletic department became aware of the slight after Flau'jae tweeted that, while she accepted her loss, playing the song was "nasty behavior". The university department then issued a statement condemning the DJ's actions as disrespectful to both the LSU program and Flau'jae, and stated, "We regret that it came to that in our venue after a game that saw both teams capture the level of national attention that women’s basketball has earned, and we apologize to Flau’Jae, her family and LSU."

== Influence and legacy ==
Johnson is the subject of a short documentary film called Camoflauge, directed by Lamia Lazrak. The film included interviews with Johnson's close family and friends including Tammie Green (his mother), Flau'jae Johnson (his daughter), producers, and rapper Boosie Badazz. The film premiered at the 2016 Savannah Film Festival and won a 2016 Red Dot Design Award in Communication.

== Discography ==
=== Albums ===
- Crime Pays (with Crime Affiliates) (1999)
- I Represent (2000)
- Strictly 4 da Streets: Drugs Sex and Violence, Vol. 1 (2001)
- Keepin It Real (2002)

=== Mixtapes ===
- Underground Savannah (2003)
- Home of the True Emcees - Tribute to Jason "Camoflauge" Johnson (2006)
- The Camoflauge Collective (R.I.P) (2012)
- Still I Represent (2011)

=== Guest appearances ===
- Dulaa "Pure Pain" Komplex Feelings
- DJ B-Lord "Bout My Money" Trick Daddy (feat. Camoflauge)
- DJ Smallz Southern Smoke 9: Money is Still a Major Issue (Part 1 of 2) (hosted by Pitbull) "Pure Pain"
- White Dawg "We Ballin" Bonifide

== See also ==
- List of murdered hip hop musicians
- List of unsolved murders (2000–present)
