= So Strung Out =

Single by C-Block

from the album General Population
- Released: October 4, 1996
- Genre: Hip hop; Euro Hop
- Length: 3:44 (radio version); 6:04 (extended version)
- Label: Maad, WEA, Warner Music
- Songwriters: A.Joseph, J.White, F.Miller, J.Wagner, U.Buchmann
- Producers: Franky Miller, Jörg Wagner

C-Block singles chronology
"Shake Dat Azz" (1996)	"So Strung Out" (1996)	"Time Is Tickin' Away" (1997)

"So Strung Out" is a song by German hip-hop group C-Block. Released as a single on October 4, 1996, in Germany, it was included in C-Block's debut album General Population in the following year.

In 1997 the song had entered the top ten in charts of several countries and remained popular after C-Block's breakup.

== Themes and composition ==
"So Strung Out" was recorded at Toneway & Paradise Studio. The music was composed by Franky Miller, Jörg Wagner and Ulrich Buchmann and the lyrics were written by Red Dogg, Mr. P and Wagner. The refrain is sung by Spanish–German vocalist Raquel Gomez with the rap part by Red Dogg and Mr. P. The lyrics revolve around drug abuse and depressive state of one person, who consumes cocaine. The black-and-white music video conveys an anti-drug message with the words "stop the madness" and "say no to drugs" shown in the end. Throughout the music video some features of Toronto are shown, including the Metro Theatre.

According to The Echo Nest, "So Strung Out" is composed in the minor scale, in the key of A♭ and is set in the common time. The extended version of the song has a tempo of 100 beats per minute. That version begins with introductory a cappella recitative about abusive drug experience.

== Reception ==
"So Strung Out" was credited with giving "the real breakthrough" to C-Block. The song entered the top five of German Media Control Charts and VIVA Top 100. The radio version of "So Strung Out" was included in the film score for 14 Days to Life. The song also appears in several compilation albums and has off-single remixes.

=== Charts ===
Chart (1997)	Peak position
Austria (Ö3 Austria Top 40)	14
Finland (Suomen virallinen lista)	7
Germany (GfK)	4
Hungary (Mahasz)	5
Switzerland (Schweizer Hitparade)	7

=== Year-end charts ===
Chart (1997)	Position
Germany (Official German Charts)	18
Romania (Romanian Top 100)	13

== Track list ==
- CD single
1. "So Strung Out" (Radio Version) – 3:44
2. "So Strung Out" (Extended Version) – 6:04
3. "So Strung Out" (Paranoid Mix) – 4:33
4. "So Strung Out" (Mysterious Version) – 5:06
