= Skandal im Sperrbezirk =

Single by Spider Murphy Gang

from the album Dolce vita
- Released: September 1981
- Studio: Rainbow Studio, Munich
- Genre: Rock'n'Roll, Neue Deutsche Welle
- Length: 3:36
- Label: EMI Records/Electrola
- Songwriter: Günther Sigl
- Producers: Harald Steinhauer, Spider Murphy Gang

"Skandal im Sperrbezirk" is a song by the German rock band Spider Murphy Gang, released in September 1981 as a single from their album Dolce Vita.

The song became the band's first and only number-one hit, selling approximately 750,000 copies.

== Background ==
The music and lyrics were written by the band's vocalist and bassist, Günther Sigl. The band's keyboard player, Michael Busse, was influenced by The Who's song Won't Get Fooled Again, particularly its staccato melody played on an electronic organ. Busse used a Moog Liberation keytar to recreate this sound. By using a pitch wheel and vibrato, he was able to simulate the sound of a police siren.

=== Fictional prostitute "Rosi" ===
The song's lyrics tell the story of a fictional prostitute in Munich named "Rosi," known for stealing clients from other prostitutes in the Sperrbezirk, a designated area in the city where prostitution is illegal. "Rosi" was the name of a friend of Sigl. Another inspiration for Skandal im Sperrbezirk was the 1970 schlager song Skandal um Rosi by Erik Silvester.

=== Context ===
"Skandal im Sperrbezirk" was written in the context of changes to Munich's Sperrbezirksverordnung ("restricted area ordinance"). When the city hosted the 1972 Summer Olympics, the ordinance was tightened. It was further restricted in 1980 after the CSU gained a majority in Munich's local government in 1978. Under Peter Gauweiler, who had been who served as Kreisverwaltungsreferent (district management official) in Munich, the ordinance was more strictly enforced, and prostitutes were moved to the outskirts of the city. Gauweiler also targeted sex clubs, peep shows, and bars with questionable reputations. His goal was to eliminate "hot sex" in Munich.

As a result, prostitution became illegal in nearly all areas of Munich, including apartments and hotels. The red-light districts were relocated to the outskirts of the city. These areas still exist today, such as a parking lot on Bundesstraße 13 near the Neuherberg exit of the A9, which is still used for street prostitution. Although located on Munich's outskirts, this area belongs to the municipality of Oberschleißheim. The chorus line Und draußen vor der großen Stadt stehn die Nutten sich die Füße platt ("And outside the big city, the prostitutes stand around till their feet hurt") references these street prostitution areas formed due to the Sperrbezirksverordnung.

=== Airplay boycott ===
Due to the use of the word Nutte (German for "whore"), the song was boycotted by radio stations in Bavaria. However, outside of Bavaria, the song received radio play and reached No. 1 on the German single charts.

The song was also never played on the ZDF-Hitparade. According to Sigl, the show's host, Dieter Thomas Heck, refused to play the song on television, considering it "too hot."

=== Phone number "32 16 8" ===
The phone number "32 16 8," used in the song's lyrics, was reportedly a real number belonging to an older woman who began receiving numerous questionable calls shortly after the song's release.

In an interview, Sigl stated that the number became the most famous phone number in Germany. The musicians had checked to see if it existed in Munich, which it did not, but it was active in several areas outside the city. Some teenagers used the number for prank calls. The band covered the cost of several number changes and sent bouquets to those affected. In 2006, the number block 089/32168000 to 32168999 was assigned to Telefonica.

== Cover versions ==
- In 1997, Wolfgang Ambros and Spider Murphy Gang performed the song live, and this version was released on Ambros' album Raritäten.
- In 2018, the American metal band Metallica played a version of the song during a concert at the Olympiahalle in Munich.
- In 2020, the German rock band Eisbrecher released a cover of Skandal im Sperrbezirk as a single for their cover album Schicksalsmelodien.

== Continuation of "Rosi" ==
In 2012, the German hip-hop group Blumentopf and Günther Sigl wrote a sequel to Skandal im Sperrbezirk, in which "Rosi" is portrayed as a homeless, impoverished older woman who has lost her charms. She is depicted as part of society's marginalized group.

== Commercial success ==
Despite being boycotted in Bavaria, the song reached number one on the German single charts at the beginning of 1982, selling over 750,000 copies. It also reached number one on the Austrian single charts and the Schweizer Hitparade. The song received a gold certification in Germany from the Bundesverband Musikindustrie.

It was the first and only song by Spider Murphy Gang to reach number one on the charts.

=== Chart positions ===
Weekly chart performance for "Skandal im Sperrbezirk"
Chart (1982)	Peak position
Austria (Ö3 Austria Top 40)	1
Belgium (Ultratop 50 Flanders)	6
Germany (Official German Charts)	1
Netherlands (Dutch Top 40)	5
Netherlands (Single Top 100)	4
Switzerland (Schweizer Hitparade)	1

=== Certifications ===
Certifications for "Skandal im Sperrbezirk"
Region	Certification	Certified units/sales
Germany (BVMI)	Gold	500,000^{^}
^{^} Shipments figures based on certification alone.
