= Unterbiberger Hofmusik =

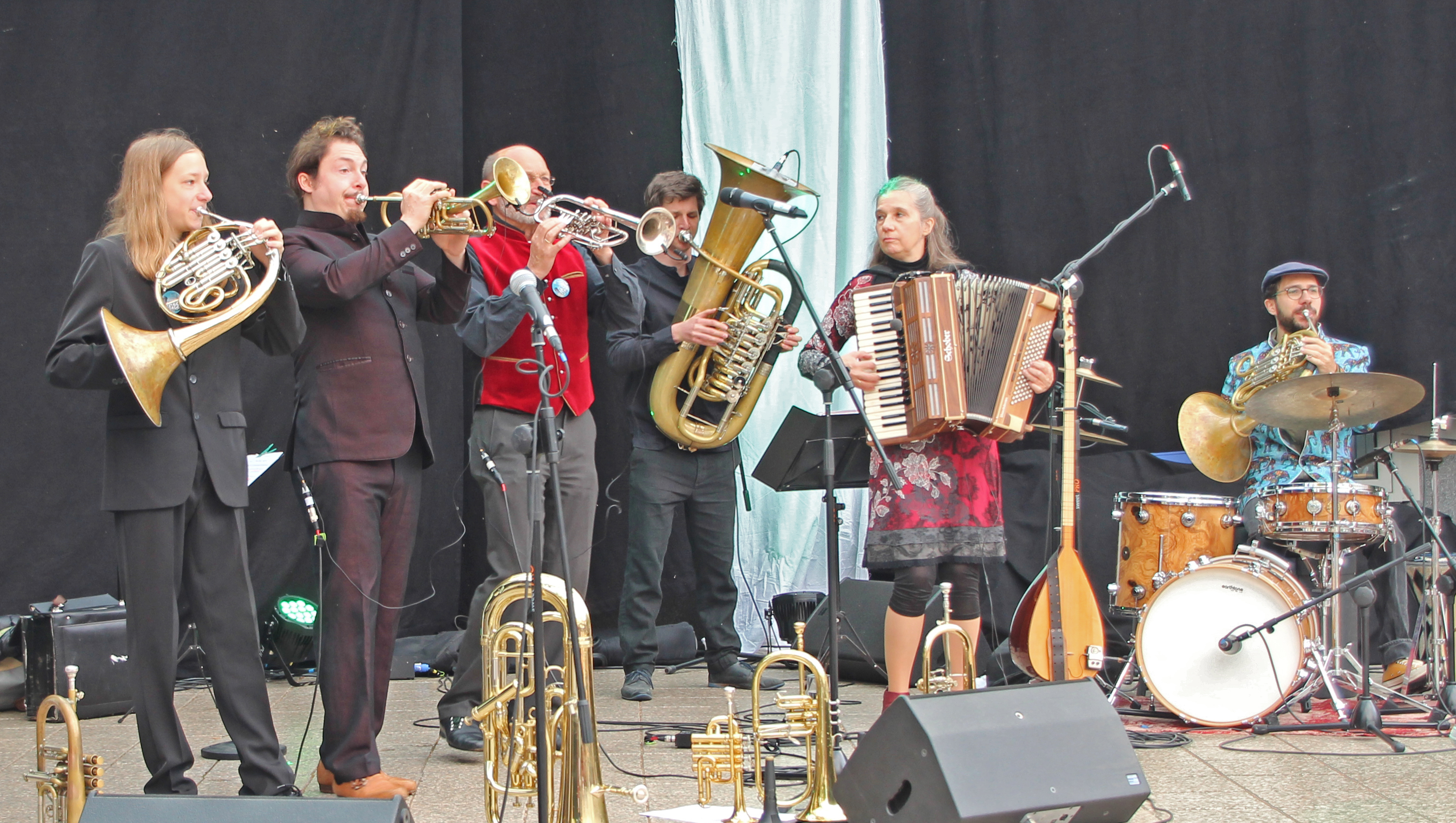
Unterbiberger Hofmusik

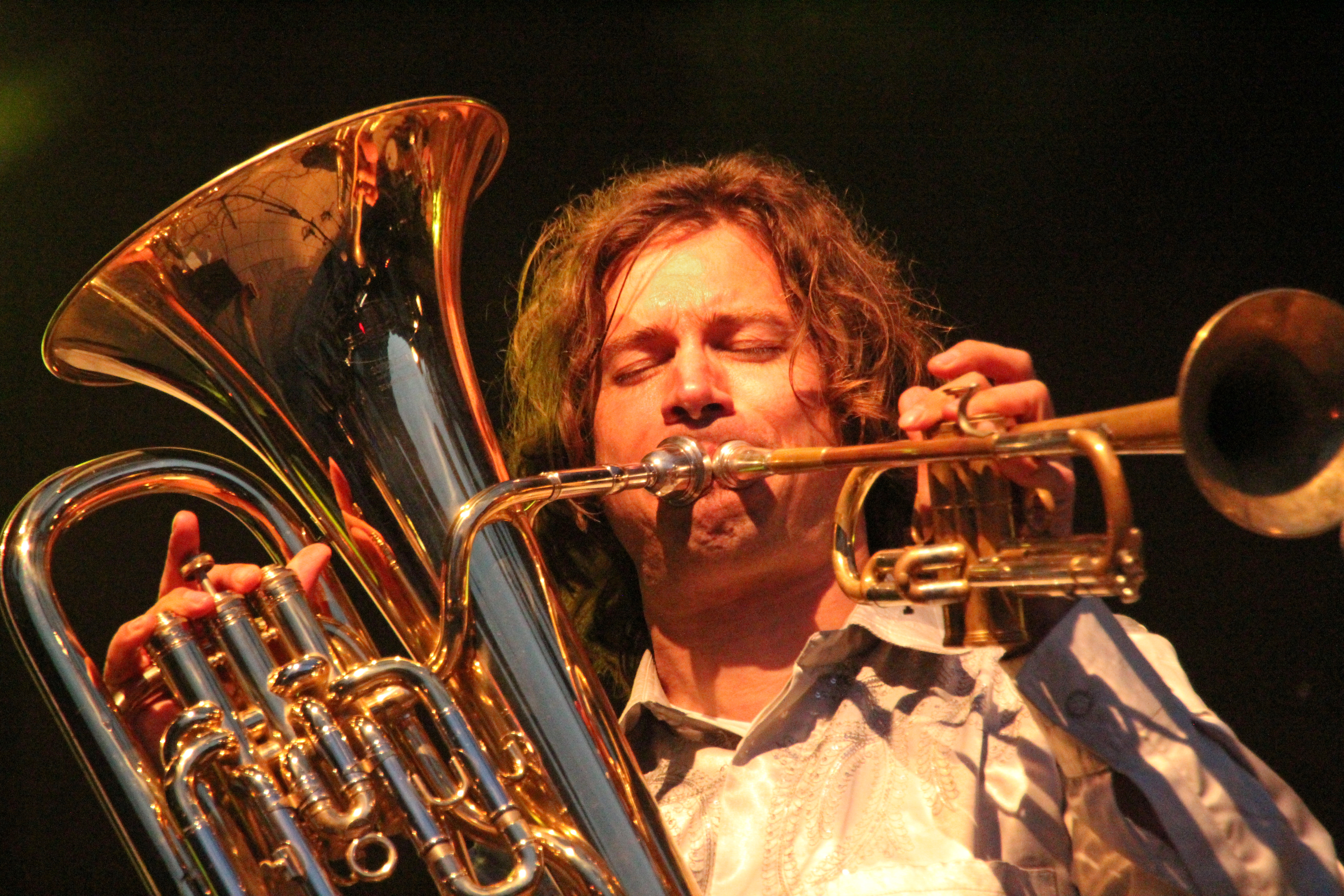
Matthias Schriefl

Unterbiberger Hofmusik is an ensemble based in Unterbiberg near Munich, Germany playing a fusion of traditional Bavarian and urban jazz sound. Franz Josef Himpsl and Irene Himpsl and their family form the core of this group.

== History ==
After studying classical music and after first engagements as a professional musician Franz Josef Himpsl returned to college to be a teacher at secondary schools with the subjects music and physical education. His wife Irene originally comes from classical music as well. She studied music to be a teacher at grammar schools and the piano was her main instrument (teacher Gitti Pirner and others ).

Encouraged by her husband she started playing folk music and the accordion, which is her instrument at the Unterbiberger Hofmusik. At the beginning the two of them played Bavarian folk music without any major ambitions - for friends, at weddings and festivals but first and foremost for themselves.
But folk music was only one side for the Himpsls simultaneously Franz Himpsl had engagements as a jazz trumpeter. For his own further vocational education he attended a masterclass in 1992 which was held by the renowned American jazz trumpeter Claudio Roditi in Stuttgart. Roditi and Himpsl became loosely acquainted and became more intimate when a short time later Roditi played in the Jazzclub Unterfahrt in Munich with the Klaus Ignatzek Group. During a visit in Unterbiberg the Himpsl couple surprised their guest with a Bavarian serenade and Roditi with his affinity to old European musical traditions was delighted and spontaneously took out his trumpet and improvised on the tune - a crossover idea was born. But his Bavarian hosts did not take the jazz star's enthusiasm seriously who wanted to turn this private session into a concert project.

Franz Himpsl remembers, On Whitsun Sunday 1994 I received a call from Roditi, which showed that he was serious about the project. In the following year the first CD Bajazzo of the Unterbiberger Hofmusik was recorded within 3 days. Only after this recording the studio project became a touring project. Its success resulted in further CD - productions.

For these productions the original cast of the group with trumpet, accordion, harp and tuba was expanded with the trombone player Erwin Gregg. Claudio Roditi, Jay Ashby and Hannes Läubin played as guests with the group. The next CD (Vivamus), which was recorded in the Bayerischer Rundfunk studios, also included Brazilian music and saw the debut of Himpsl sons Xaver (trumpet) and Ludwig (horn, French horn), then 11 and 9 years old.

As of the fourth CD, the Australian trumpeter Andrew McNaughton has also joined to the group.

With their CD "Bavaturka" they mix Bavarian and Turkish culture the first time, together with Şeref Dalyanoğlu and other soloists, like Matthias Schriefl and Jay Ashby.

As of November 2013 their Christmas project "Stern über Biburg" is available also. Together with the vibraphone player Wolfgang Lackerschmid and their old friend Claudio Roditi, they busy themselves with different Christmas traditions.

In September 2016 they brought their focus to the Turkish music one more time with their Album Bavaturka Vol.II

In March 2017 they started their new Live program "Dahoam und Retour" (home and back again). It incorporates many of the influences they brought with them from their tours to Moskau, Cairo, Mumbai or Turkey.

You can hear them live at this locations: https://www.unterbiberger.de/konzerte/

== Musicians ==
- Franz Josef Himpsl – trumpet, piccolo, flugel, vocals
- Irene Himpsl – accordion
- Xaver Maria Himpsl – trumpet, piccolo, flugel, vocals
- Ludwig Maximilian (Wiggerl) Himpsl – frenchhorn, percussion, drumset
- Franz Himpsl jr. – frenchhorn

changing lineup :

- Konrad Sepp – tuba
- Michael Engl – tuba
- Florian Mayerhofer – tuba

former musicians:

- Herbert Hornig – tuba
- Hubert Hohmann – tuba
- Irmgrad Gorzwski – harp
- Kathrin Pechlof – harp
- Dirk Janoske – trombone
- Erwin Gregg – trombone
- Martina Holler – harp
- Hannes Läubin – trumpet

== Soloists ==
- Claudio Roditi
- Jay Ashby
- Andrew McNaughton
- Mathias Engl
- Matthias Schriefl
- Seref Dalyanoglu
- Wolfgang Lackerschmid

== Discography ==
1. BAJAZZO Unterbiberger Hofmusik meets Claudio Roditi (1995)
2. VIVAMUS (1997)
3. made in USA (1998)
4. the 4th (2002)
5. Bavaria meets the world LIVE (2004)
6. Made in Germany (2008)
7. Bavaturka (2012)
8. Stern über Biburg (Christmas) (2014)
9. Bavaturka Vol.II (2016)
10. Dahoam und Retour LIVE +DVD (September 2019) Bestenliste Preis der deutschen Schallplattenkritik 2019 [1]
