= Silicon Dream =

German synthpop band (1987-1995)

- Origin: Munich, Germany
- Genres: Italo disco; synth-pop; house; Eurodance
- Years active: 1987–1995
- Labels: Blow Up; Mega Records; JCI Records; Ariola; Key One
- Members: Klaus Munzert

Silicon Dream was a synth-pop band formed by the German Klaus Munzert (born 14 July 1957) in 1987. Other prominent members were the dancers Angelo and Danny, who featured on the band's music videos.

Inspired by bands such as Kraftwerk and Depeche Mode, the band came to life following Munzert's experimentations with samplers and his desire to have fun onstage dressed up, even though other people still managed to recognize him. The band's sound was similar to contemporary acts such as Off and 16 Bit, Silicon Dream performing live with the latter.

Silicon Dream's most notable single was "Marcello the Mastroianni" which spent four weeks in the German top 20, peaking at No. 15 in September 1987. The single also tied for No. 112 on the 1987 year end chart. Another notable single "Ludwig Fun" released in 1989 merged acid house with classical music and spent several weeks in official German Top 75 singles chart by Media Control.

== Albums ==
=== Time Machine (1988) ===
Time Machine

Studio album by Silicon Dream
- Released: 1988
- Genre: Synth-pop
- Label: Blow Up
- Producer: Klaus Munzert

Time Machine was the only album released by the band in 1988. A concept album with the theme of time travel was released on LP and CD, the latter one including three extra tracks previously available on the corresponding single releases.

Track listing:

1. "Time Machine" (You Are the Master of Time-Age)
2. "Jimmy Dean Loved Marilyn (Film Ab)" (The Hollywood-Age)
3. "Corleone Speaking" (The Chicago-Age)
4. "Holiday in St. Tropez - Eating Pizza in Ibiza" (The Cola-Age)
5. "Marcello the Mastroianni" (The Fellini-Age)
6. "Space Intro" (The Age of the First Cosmic Steps)
7. "Andromeda" (The Space-Age)
8. "Albert Einstein - Everything is Relative" (The Age of the Inventors)
9. "Primaballerina" (The Romantic-Age)
10. "Don't Break My Heart" (The Age of Love)
11. "Marcello the Mastroianni" (Monster Mix)
12. "Albert Einstein - Everything is Relative" (Russian Mix)
13. "Jimmy Dean Loved Marilyn (Film Ab)" (Mix Cinemascope)

=== Ludwig Fun (1990) ===
Ludwig Fun

Studio album by Silicon Dream
- Released: 1990
- Genre: Synth-pop
- Label: Key One
- Producer: Klaus Munzert

Track listing:

1. "Ludwig Fun" (Classic Acid Mix)
2. "Rendezvous and a Flirt with You" (as Departure) (Fricci Mix)
3. "Wunderbar" (Where is the Bar Mix)
4. "You Got a Bausparvertrag???" (as Mega) (Rubel Mix)
5. "I'm Your Doctor" (Kommunismus Interruptus Perversion)
6. "King Kong Dancing" (as Departure) (No Emergency Exit Mix)
7. "Baby Baby Hear My Heartbeat... Mi Corazon" (as Manzerata) (Esmeralda Mix)
8. "Syntaxerklarung"
9. "Wanna Make Love to You Baby"
10. "Silicon Dancer Mega Mix" (The First Cut is the Deepest)

=== Greatest Hits '87 - '95 (1995) ===
Greatest Hits '87 - '95

Studio album by Silicon Dream
- Released: 1995
- Genre: Synth-pop
- Label: Key One
- Producer: Klaus Munzert

Released in 1995 due to the wishes of the record company.

Track listing:

1. "Space Intro"
2. "Marcello the Mastroianni" ('95 Mix)
3. "Timemachine"
4. "Don't Break My Heart"
5. "Albert Einstein - Everything is Relative"
6. "Syntaxerklarung"
7. "Marcello the Mastroianni '87"
8. "Andromeda"
9. "Jimmy Dean Love Marilyn (Film Ab)"
10. "Corleone Speaking"
11. "Wanna Make Love to You Baby"
12. "I'm Your Doctor" (Ganz in Weiss)
13. "Ludwig Fun"
14. "Marcello the Mastroianni" ('95 Hammond Mix)

== Singles ==
- 1987: "Albert Einstein - Everything is Relative"
- 1987: "Albert Einstein - Everything is Relative" (Russian Mix)
- 1987: "Marcello the Mastroianni"
- 1987: "Marcello the Mastroianni" (Monster Mix)
- 1988: "Andromeda"
- 1988: "Jimmy Dean Loved Marilyn (Film Ab)"
- 1988: "Jimmy Dean Loved Marilyn (Film Ab)" (Hollywood Mix)
- 1989: "Ludwig Fun"
- 1989: "Ludwig Fun" (Rabbit Mix)
- 1989: "Wunderbar"
- 1990: "I'm Your Doctor" (Ganz in Weiss)
- 1990: "I'm Your Doctor" (Rap Version)
- 1991: "Wanna Make Love"
- 1995: "Marcello The Mastroianni '95"

== Departure, Manzerata and Mega ==
During 1987 and 1988, Klaus Munzert also released singles under the names Departure, Manzerata and Mega. He considered them just additional acts to Silicon Dream and he released only one or two singles under these names.

=== Singles ===
- 1987: "King Kong Dancing" (as Departure)
- 1987: "Rendez-Vous and a Flirt with You" (as Departure)
- 1987: "Baby Baby Hear My Heartbeat - Mi Corazon" (as Manzerata)
- 1987: "You Got a Bausparvertrag???" (as Mega)
