= Paul Weschke =

German trombonist

Paul Weschke (1867–1940) was a German trombonist. He was solo trombonist for the Staatskapelle Berlin from 1895 to 1929. In addition he taught at the Staatliche Akademische Hochschule für Musik in Berlin from 1903 to 1934.
