= Münchner Bank =

German credit union

Coordinates: 48°08′54.24″N 11°37′0.48″E

Münchner Bank eG
- Company type: Private
- Industry: Finance and Insurance
- Headquarters: Munich, Germany
- Key people: Eberhard Sasse
- Products: Financial services
- Total assets: ▲€ 2.625 billion (2008)
- Number of employees: 525 (2017)
- Website: www.muenchner-bank.de

The Münchner Bank is a German credit union headquartered in Munich. Founded in 1862, it is the oldest and largest credit union in Bavaria with 525 employees at 41 locations and assets of 2.625 Billion Euros (c. 3700 Million US-Dollar). It functions as a bank providing payment-transaction and loan services to small businesses and personal customers.
