= BeNuts =

German ska band

beNUTS
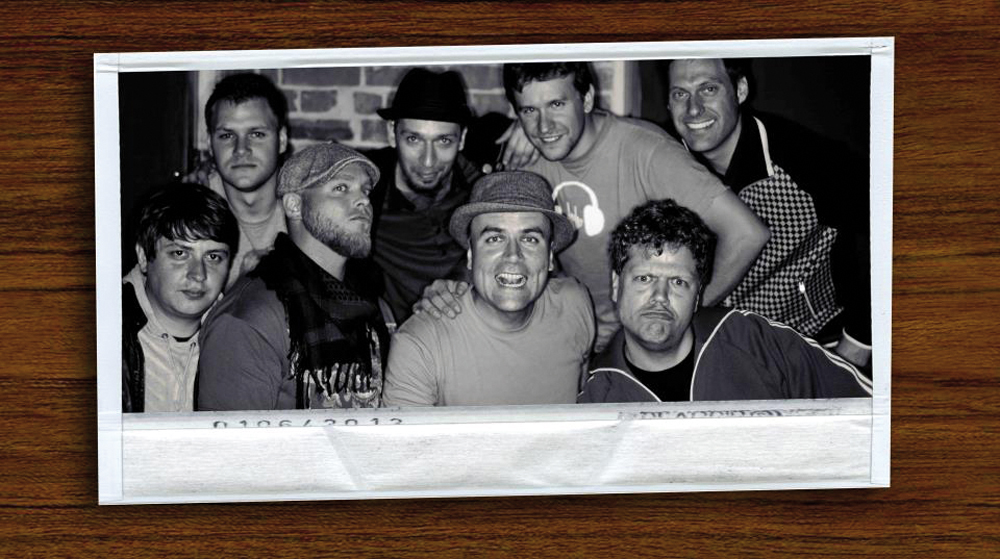

Background information
- Origin: Munich, Germany
- Genre: Ska
- Years active: 1994–present
- Members: Silvester Kuhar (vocals); Fabian Ziegler (bass); Jens Schleifenbaum (guitar); Deniz Dizdar (organ); Markus Klöpper (drums); Jesko Krüger (trumpet); Simon Stusak (saxophone); Mike Huber (trombone)
- Past members: Konrad "El Konno" Wissmath (vocals); Robert Johnson (vocals); Ralf Woltmann (vocals); Marco Probst (vocals); Sebastian Luber (trumpet); Christoph Ramm (trumpet); Max Walter (trombone); Martin Herzmann (saxophone); Martin Kleindienst (saxophone); Mathias Stößlein (saxophone); Peter Steffan (saxophone); Thomas Müller (saxophone); Oliver Zenglein (organ); Marcus Hintermayr (organ); Mathias Eder (guitar); Alexander Erdody (bass); Daniel Mauss (drums)
- Website: www.benuts.de

BeNuts (stylized as beNUTS) are a German ska band from Munich.

== History ==
BeNUTS was founded in 1994 and has since been a very popular concert attraction throughout all of Germany. After four CD releases with Artysan and Wolverine Records, they toured Europe (Austria, Switzerland, France, Czech Republic, Spain, Slowenia and Italy) and played a tour together with English band Bad Manners in Germany. On the Sex Sells Tour in 2004, beNUTS played some shows together with Spanish band Ska-P. This had a great influence on the musical style of the band, which changed from traditional ska to offbeat rock.

A notable feature about the band are their multilingual song lyrics. While most of the songs, as well as all of the album titles, are English, many compositions also feature French, German, Spanish and even Croatian lyrics and titles. This made touring through most of Central Europe possible. In the first years of the band, line-up changes occurred very frequently, especially the position of the singer and frontman which experienced a lot of changes through the years. From 2003 to May 2006, this spot was filled by American vocalist Robert Allen Johnson.

In 2005, beNUTS played as one of the first German ska bands in Russia and Serbia. In December 2006, the band released the live-album Best Of... Live and played seven concerts in Japan. In 2008, the band performed again in Russia and it was filmed and broadcast by A-One TV and MTV Russia. In autumn 2008, after another tour of Japan together with Dallax, the last founding member Daniel Mauss ended his active musical career and took over management of the band.

In 2009, the band was sent to Romania by the Goethe-Institut. They released their seventh album, Shut up and Dance on GLM Records in September 2009 where they sing in six different languages (English, German, French, Russian, Japanese and Arabian). After another tour in Germany, singer El Konno left the band to focus on his own musical projects. After a one-year lasting search for a new singer, where it became silent around the band, bass player Fabian took over the lead vocals at the end of 2010. At the end of 2011, former singer Kuhar rejoined the band after a break of almost 10 years.

== Discography ==
- 1996: 3 Tone S'Kaa (Artysan Records)
- 1998: Captain Rude (Artysan Records)
- 1999: Haching (Rockwerk Records)
- 2001: Nutty By Nature (Wolverine Records)
- 2004: Sex Sells (Wolverine Records)
- 2006: A Fistful of Offbeat (EP) (Rockwerk Records)
- 2007: Best Of... Live! (Wolverine Records)
- 2008: Bavarian Ska Maniacs (South Bell Records - Japan, Pork Pie Records - Europe)
- 2009: Shut Up and Dance (Impulso/GLM)
