= Guido Henneböhl =

Guido Henneböhl is a musician and concert organizer based in Berlin, Germany. He has worked with composers like Alwynne Pritchard, Jeremy Woodruff and Carlos Sandoval, and improvisers like Jochen Arbeit, Andre Vida and Brendan Dougherty.

Henneböhl develops synthesizer instruments by circuit bending old keyboards and toys, and combining them with self-constructed primitive synthesizer elements. The instruments are known for their wide range of tones and dynamics, and produce stochastic-like musical phrases.

== Projects ==
Hennebohl has an ongoing project, the KGB Trio, with electronic musician Kim Cascone and drummer Brendan Dougherty, which has been touring and recording since 2005.

== Discography ==
- (2005) Swiss Pharmaceuticals (with KGB Trio) (Utech)
- (2008) Smoke on Devil's Mountain (with KGB Trio) (Scrapple)
- (2024) Mondo Skull - L3NR$ (Emitter Micro)
