= Zah1de =

German rapper (born 2010)

- Born: Zahide Kayaci; 6 June 2010 (age 16); Berlin, Germany
- Occupations: Rapper; dancer; influencer
- Years active: 2023–present
- Musical career
- Genres: German rap; dance
- Label: Universal Music Group

Zahide Kayaci (born 6 June 2010) known mononymously as Zah1de, is a German rapper, dancer and social media influencer. Zahide first gained recognition through TikTok with million followers and likes before signing with Universal Music Group in 2024. She is currently a member of Berlin Gen Z dance group "Lunatix".

Kayaci is best known for her viral dances influenced content and early breakthrough in the German music industry. She is considered one of the youngest rising artists in German rap. In 2025, she gained additional recognition through her involvement in the viral TikTok challenge "Zah1de Won This Trend", a social media trend centred around fast-paced choreography and short performance clips. She won a Bambi Award and 2 YouTube Music Awards in November 2025. She made a song called Sweet Sixteen in June 2026.

== Career ==
Kayaci began posting dance and performance content on TikTok in late 2023, quickly building a large audience. Her visibility grew significantly through videos featuring the Lunatix dance crew. In late 2024, she signed with Universal Music Group and officially transitioning from social media performer to recording artist. She released her debut single that same year. She released several singles between 2024 and 2025, blending elements of German rap, pop, and dance driven hooks.

Throughout 2025, Kayaci continued to release a series of singles including ''Ballert Auf Lautlos", "Mona Lisa Motion", "Zahide Did It Better", "Kotti d’Azur", "Uff Yaa", and "Rede" featuring benno!. She gained attention after her performance popularized the viral trend, "Zahide Won This Trend", on TikTok. In November 2025, she won her first award Bambi Awards for Shooting Star of the Year and also won two YouTube Music Awards for Newcomer of the Year and Most Used Song In Shorts for the single "Mona Lisa Motion". Her debut studio album Pretty Privilege was scheduled for release in December 2025. Her debut album appeared on the GfK Entertainment charts seen in position 2.

Kayaci's dream, is becoming the Queen of Pop and later released a single track titled "Queen Of Pop" on 28 May 2026, and she reached 10 million followers on TikTok. The following month, she celebrated her 16th birthday and released another single track "Sweet 16" on 11 June.

== Public image ==
Kayaci is widely associated with internet culture and TikTok trends. In 2025, she became the subject of the viral catchphrase "Zah1de Won This Trend", which spread across TikTok as users posted the phrase in the comment sections.

== Discography ==
=== Singles ===
==== As lead artist ====
Title	Year	Album
"TikTok Sportlich"	2024	Pretty Privilege
"Mona Lisa Motion"	2025	Pretty Privilege
"Ballert auf Lautlos"	2025	Pretty Privilege
"Zahide Did It Better"	2025	Pretty Privilege
"Kotti D'Azur"	2025	Pretty Privilege
"Uff Yaa"	2025	Pretty Privilege
"Rede" (featuring benno!)	2025	Pretty Privilege
"Queen Of Pop"	2026	Non-album single
"Sweet 16"	2026	Non-album single

== Awards and nominations ==
List of awards and nominations for Zah1de
Award	Year	Nominee / Work	Category	Result	Ref.
Bambi Awards	2025	Herself	Shooting Star	Won	
YouTube Music Awards	2025	Herself	Newcomer of the Year	Won	
YouTube Music Awards	2025	"Mona Lisa Motion"	Most Used Song In Shorts	Won	
