= The Shanes (German band) =

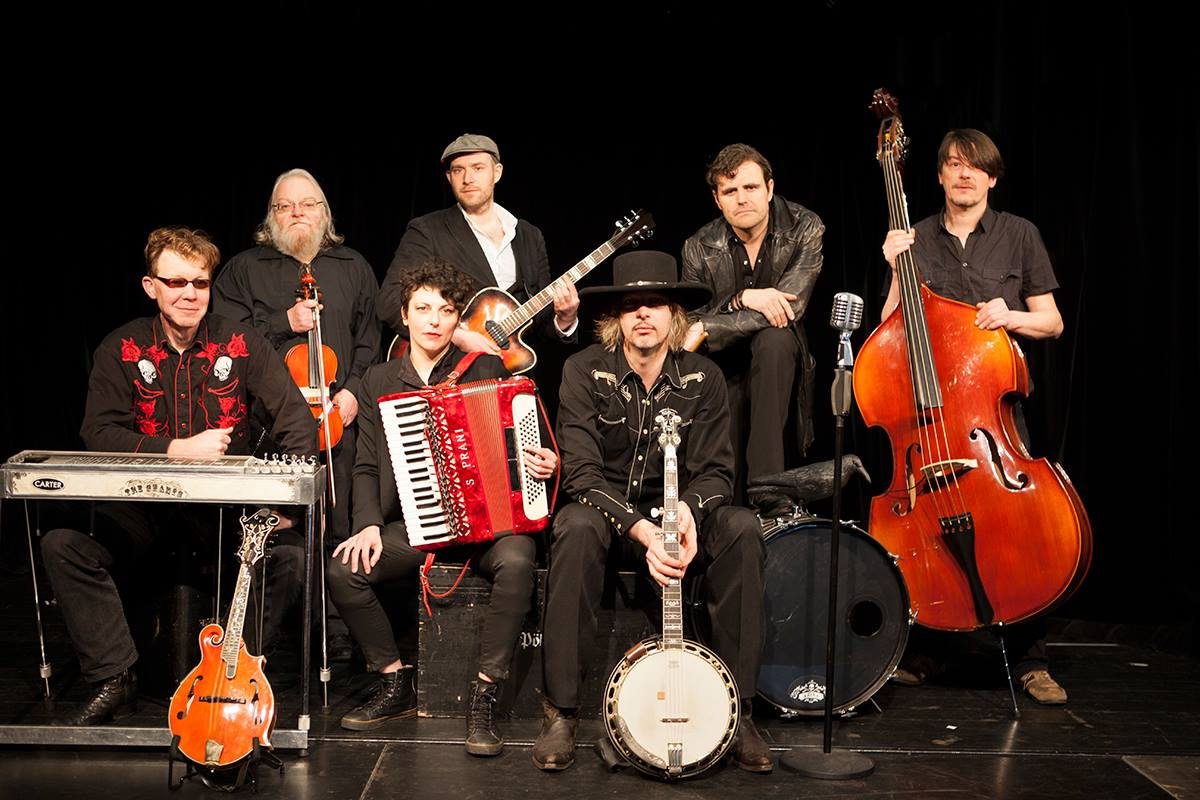
- The Shanes in 2013

Background information
- Years active: 1991–present
- Website: www.shanes.de

The Shanes are a German folk rock, folk punk, and polka band from Trier, active from 1991 until the present. The band has published 11 albums and tours mainly in Germany, Switzerland, Austria and Luxembourg, but they have also performed in the United States/Texas, Great Britain, France and Hungary.

== Members ==
- Kornelius Flowers (since 1991) - vocals
- Jörg "Warpig" Stoffregen (since 2004) - guitar, banjo, mandolin
- Matt Dawson (since 2011) - pedal steel, dobro, mandolin
- Chris Birch (since 2011) - fiddle
- Nataša Grujović (since 2008) - accordion
- Herr Dannehl (since 1994) - bass guitar, upright bass
- "Boergermeister" Markus Schu (since 2006) - drums

== Albums ==
- 1992: Songs From the Urban Country Hell (Strangeways/Indigo)
- 1993: Polka Hard (Strangeways/Indigo)
- 1994: Love Will Tear Us Apart – Vinyl-Single (Strangeways/Indigo)
- 1995: These Days EP (Strangeways/Indigo)
- 1996: Budapest Sessions feat. VEZERKAR (HU)
- 1998: 5 Years of Hard Polka 1993-1998
- 2001: The Haunted House Of Polka (Pinorrekk/Edel)
- 2005: Pölka (SumoRex/Broken Silence)
- 2007: Polka over Serbja – live in Chośebuz (SumoRex/Broken Silence)
- 2009: Squandering Youth (SumoRex/Broken Silence)
- 2013: Road Worrier (SumoRex/Broken Silence)
