= General Population (album) =

Studio album by C-Block
- Released: 26 May 1997
- Recorded: 1995–1996; Paradise Studio; Chameleon Studio; Down-Under Studio
- Genre: Hip Hop
- Length: 49:03
- Label: Maad/WEA
- Producer: Frank Müller, Ulrich Buchmann, Jörg Wagner (also exec.), Matthias Geist, Joachim Reis, Claudio Pitrella, Andreas Anton Fuchs

C-Block chronology
General Population (1997)	Keepin' It Real (1998)

General Population is the debut album of German hip-hop group C-Block, released by Maad Records and WEA in 1997. Recording sessions for the album took place during 1995 and 1996 in Germany. The album was primarily produced by the group's creators, Frank Müller, Ulrich Buchmann and Jörg Wagner. The album experienced a significant amount of commercial success and sales for a hip hop record at the time. One of the album's songs, "So Strung Out", was released as a single earlier, on 4 October 1996 and reached fourth chart position in Germany.

General Population was both a critical and commercial success.

== Track listing ==
No.	Title	Producer(s)	Length
1.	"Looking to the Sky"	Frank Müller, Ulrich Buchmann, Jörg Wagner	4:56
2.	"Time Is Tickin' Away (Extended Mix)"	Frank Müller, Ulrich Buchmann, Jörg Wagner	5:04
3.	"Round 'n Round"	Frank Müller, Ulrich Buchmann, Jörg Wagner	4:48
4.	"Everything's Good" (featuring Raquel Gomez)	Frank Müller, Ulrich Buchmann, Jörg Wagner	5:03
5.	"Summertime"	Matthias Geist, Frank Müller	4:13
6.	"So Strung Out (Extended Version)" (featuring Raquel Gomez)	Frank Müller, Ulrich Buchmann, Jörg Wagner	6:04
7.	"Being Raised" (Additional Vocals by D.Bogan)	Frank Müller, Ulrich Buchmann, Jörg Wagner	4:15
8.	"Acapella Preston"		1:19
9.	"Dem Bustas"	Frank Müller, Ulrich Buchmann, Jörg Wagner	4:42
10.	"My Life" (featuring Birgit Beelte)	Ulrich Buchmann, Claudio Pitrella, Andreas Anton Fuchs	3:34
11.	"Da Ghetto"	Matthias Geist, Frank Müller	5:11
12.	"Shake Dat Azz" (featuring A.K.-S.W.I.F.T.)	Frank Müller, Ulrich Buchmann, Jörg Wagner, Joachim Reis	3:51
13.	"Psycho"	Frank Müller, Ulrich Buchmann, Jörg Wagner, Joachim Reis	3:08

== Chart ==
=== Weekly charts ===
Chart (1997)	Peak position
Austrian Albums (Ö3 Austria)	41
Finnish Albums (Suomen virallinen lista)	17
German Albums (Offizielle Top 100)	14
Hungarian Albums (MAHASZ)	6
Swiss Albums (Schweizer Hitparade)	10

=== Year-end charts ===
Chart (1997)	Position
German Albums (Offizielle Top 100)	95
