= Javier Corcobado =

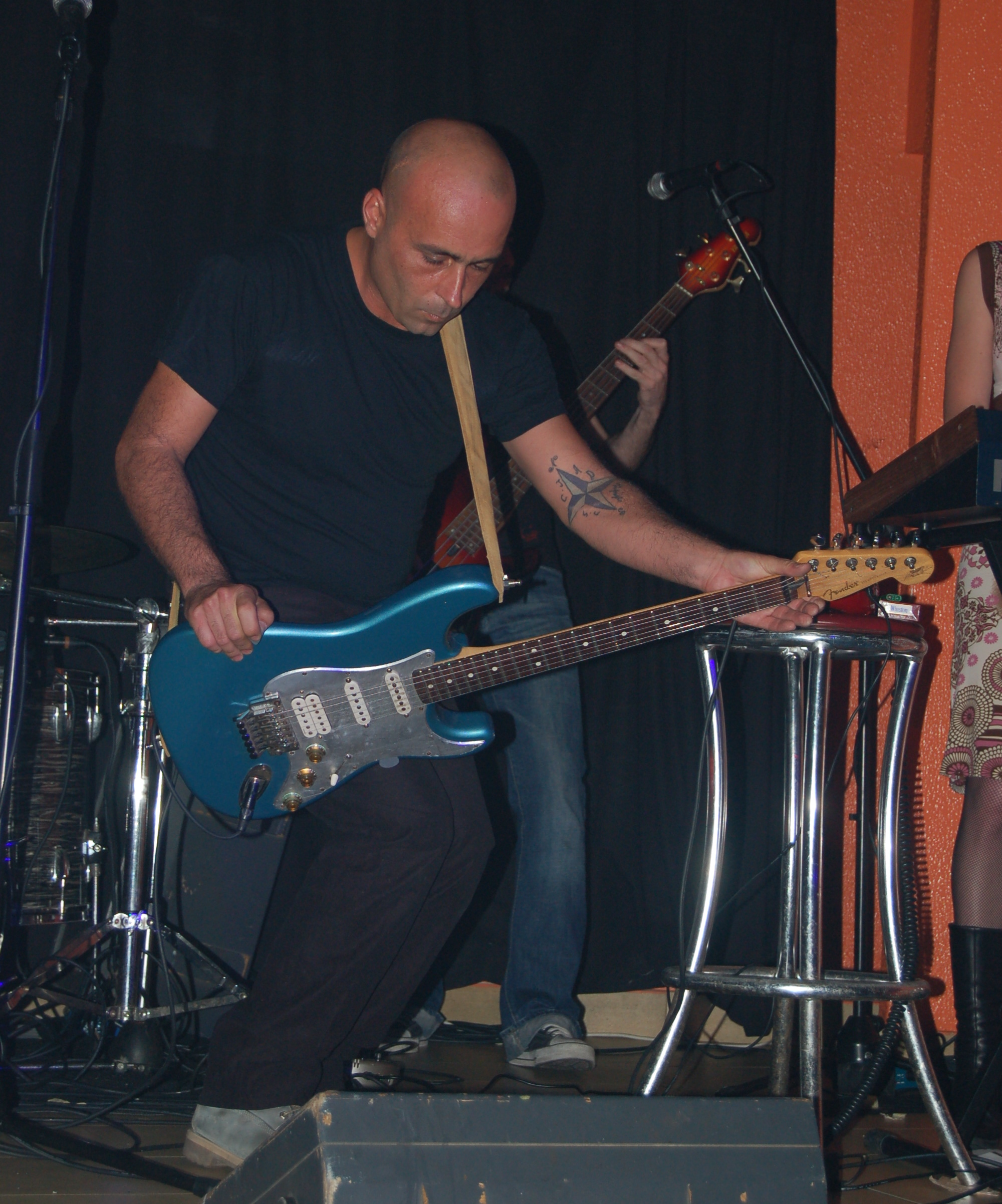
Javier Corcobado.

Javier Corcobado (born 30 July 1963) is a musician, letterist, poet and novelist. He was born in Frankfurt, Germany, the son of a couple of Spanish immigrants, and was raised in Madrid, Spain.

== Biography ==
He is also known as "El Duque del ruido" (The Duke of Noise) and he has been named by critics as the "Príncipe del underground" (Prince of the underground) in Spain. In the early '80s, he began his musical career, with underground bands like 429 Engaños, with which he recorded an album of very poor sound quality. After that he recorded the Mar otra vez album, which was his first LP. Mar otra vez is now considered a cult record in Spain, as well as in Mexico.

== Discography ==
- No he olvidado cómo jugar embarrado/ La fiesta del diablo y el cerdo [mini Lp] (1985)
- Abrrr [Mar otra vez Vs Aviador Dro] (1986)
- Edades de óxido(1986)
- De belleza/Sex Machine [Single](1986)
- Algún pâté venenoso (1987)
- Miércoles cercano al infierno [Maxisingle] (1987)
- Demonios tus ojos (1988)
- Corazón roto en 2000 pedazos [Single] (1988)
- Agrio Beso(1989)
- Poemas (1989)
- Desde tu herida [Single] (1989)
- Puerta de amor [Single] (1990)
- Tormenta de tormento (1991)
- Suceso [Ep](1991)
- Ritmo de sangre (1993)
- Boleros enfermos de amor vol.1 (1993)
- Arco iris de lágrimas (1995)
- Parole [Ep] (1995)
- Boleros enfermos de amor vol.2 (1996)
- Diminuto cielo (1996)
- Corcobator (1999)
- Una época de grabaciones accidentales (Recopilación) (2002)
- Fotografiando al corazón (2003)
- Editor de sueños (2006)
- Canciones Insolubles (1989 - 2006)(Recopilación) (2007)
- A Nadie (2009)
- Luna que se quiebra sobre la tiniebla de mi soledad (2011)
- Te estoy queriendo tanto [Ep] (2012)
