= Bad Temper Joe =

German musician

- Origin: Bielefeld
- Instrument: guitar

Bad Temper Joe [bæd ˈtɛmpə ˈʤəʊ] (born in Bielefeld, East Westphalia-Lippe) is a German musician and guitarist. He plays a Weissenborn guitar. He has released eight studio albums since 2014 and was the only European finalist of the International Blues Challenge 2020 in Memphis, Tennessee. He is the winner of the 12th German Blues Challenge 2022.

He is a singer and mainly plays slide guitar, but also harmonica and electric guitar. His music draws from the blues, but also from musical traditions such as country, rock and ties in with the program of the Great American Songbook, which he applies to the East Westphalian province.

He plays solo, with a band and in a duet with the Belgian singer and guitarist Fernant Zeste, with whom he also recorded an album entitled Haunt.

He is under contract with Timezone Records.

== Reviews ==
Dominik Rothe writes: "Despite all the cross-references to his musical roots, Bad Temper Joe is anything but a yesterday's retro artist."

Thomas Klingebiel writes about Bad Temper Joe's concerts in Memphis: "Bad Temper Joe thrilled the audience in the music clubs on the famous Beale Street, where the careers of blues icons like Muddy Waters and B. B. King began."

== Discography ==
=== Albums ===
- Sometimes a Sinner (2014)
- Man for the Road (2014)
- Tough Ain't Easy (2015)
- Double Trouble (2016)
- Solitary Mind (2017)
- Ain't Worth a Damn (2018)
- The Maddest of Them All (2019)
- The Memphis Tapes (2020)
- 2022: Glitter & Blues
- 2025: The Acoustic Blues Guitar Revue

=== Collaborations ===
- Haunt (2019) (feat. Fernant Zeste)
