= Carmen Geutjes =

German pianist

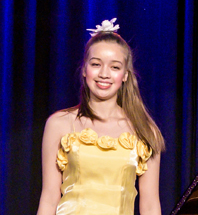
Geutjes performing in 2019

Carmen Geutjes (born 2003) is a German pianist. She has performed in China, Spain, Lithuania and the Netherlands, in addition to her native Germany.

== Early life and education ==
Geutjes had her first piano lessons at the age of five. She lives with her parents in Duisburg-South and is a student at Reinhard and Max Mannesmann Gymnasium. Since the age of ten, she has been studying piano at the Robert Schumann University of Music and Media in Duesseldorf in the class of Professor Paolo Giacometti.

== Career ==
Geutjes has won national and international piano competitions, such as the first prize at the Steinway Piano Competition in Hamburg 2013, one year later the first prize in the International Piano Competition Maria Herrero in Spain. With her epoch-spanning program, in particular with the Carmen Variations of Horowitz, she became the winner of the 10th Bitburg Piano Competition 2018.

== Repertoire (selection) ==
Geutjes plays pieces by composers of all musical epochs, often extremely difficult works which only a few pianists have attempted to perform, such as Prokofiev's Toccata the "Carmen Variations" by Horowitz, The First Piano Concerto by Tchaikovsky and Petrushka by Stravinsky.

== Select appearances ==
Geutjes has been performing in concert halls since she was 6 years old including Mercatorhalle Duisburg, Laeiszhalle Hamburg, Robert Schumann Hall Düsseldorf, Kaunas State Philharmonic, Auditorium Medina Elvira Granada Spain, City Hall Chongqing China, Forum am See Lindau, Essen Philharmonic, Town Hall Recklinghausen, Stadthalle Mülheim, Bürgerhaus Rees, Harenberg City Center Dortmund and Wasserburg Ratingen.

== Awards ==
• 2010: Audience Award International Hohenlimburg Piano Competition

• 2011: 1st Prize Jugend musiziert Piano Competition

• 2013: 1st Prize Steinway Piano Competition

• 2014: 1st Prize El Concourso Internacional de Piano María Herrero Spain

• 2015: 1st Prize Jugend musiziert Piano Competition Duo

•2016: "Virtuoso 2016" – Munich Piano Podium

•2017: 1st Prize Jugend musiziert Piano Competition

•2017: Audience Award International Piano Competition for the Rotary Youth Music Prize

•2018: 1st Prize and Special Prize Bitburg Piano Competition
