= Spider Murphy Gang =

German rock band

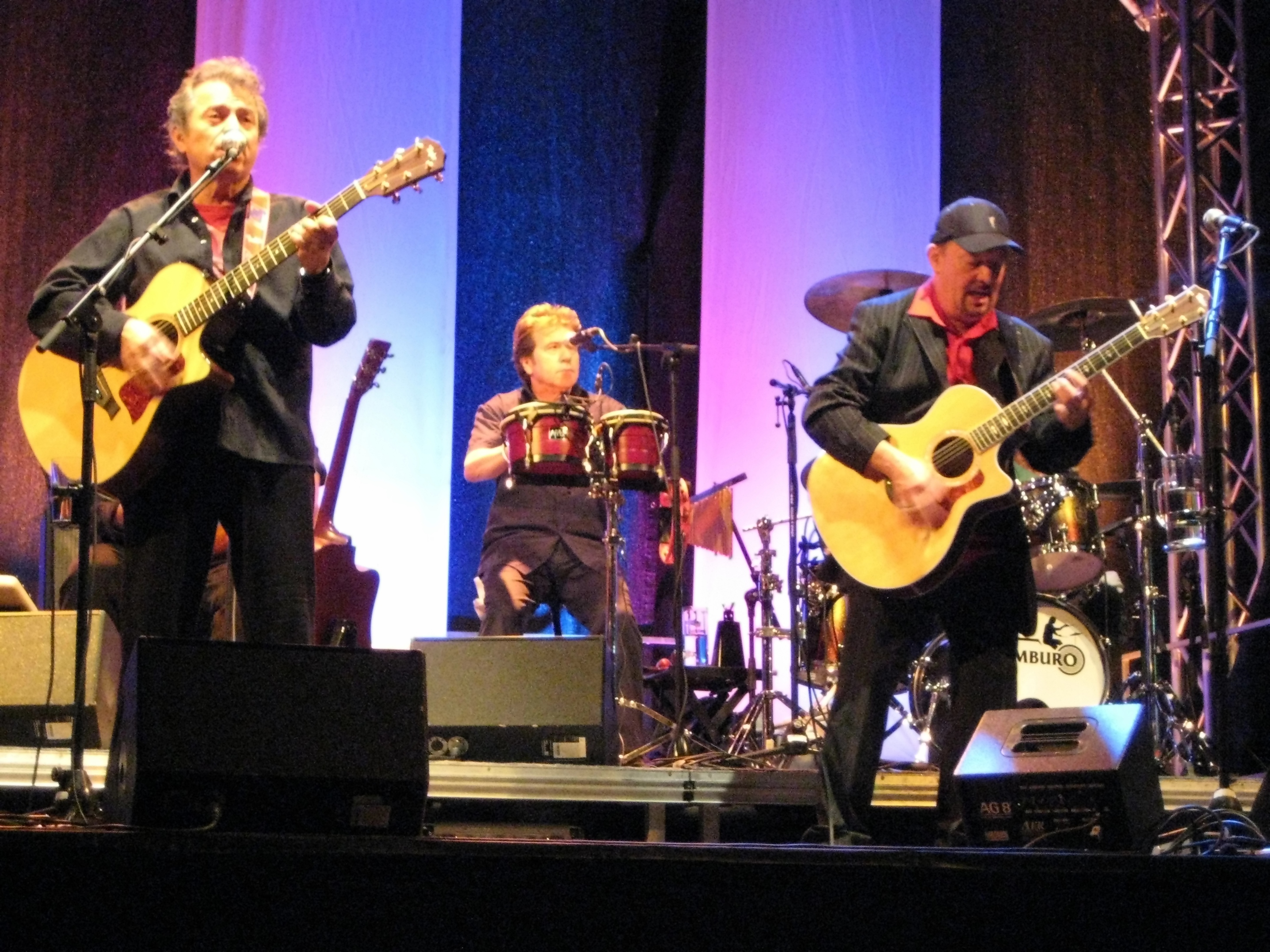
- Spider Murphy Gang in 2008

Background information
- Origin: Munich, Germany
- Genres: Pop rock, rock and roll, rockabilly
- Years active: 1977–present

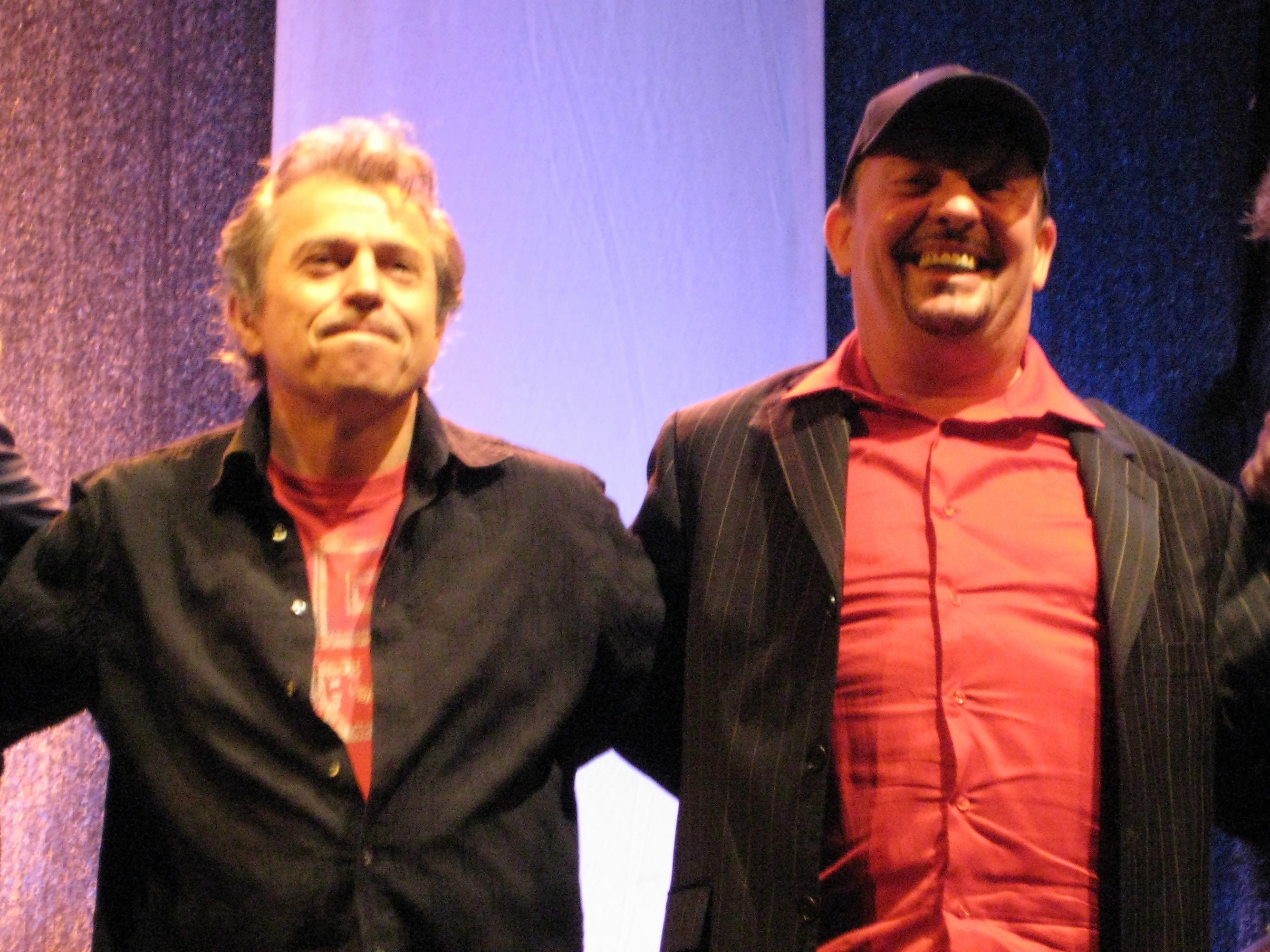
Günther Sigl and Gerhard Gmell ("Barny Murphy")

The Spider Murphy Gang is a German rock band from Munich best known for their greatest hit "Skandal im Sperrbezirk", which is a famous song of the Neue Deutsche Welle. It was founded in 1977 by bank clerk Günther Sigl, together with Gerhard Gmell ("Barny Murphy"), Michael Busse and Franz Trojan. Elements of the Bavarian German dialect are used in many songs.

Their name is a reference to Elvis Presley's song, "Jailhouse Rock", in which a 'Spider Murphy' played the tenor saxophone. "Spider Murphy" is also referred to in a song written by Larry Kirwan of the Irish fusion Band Black 47's song, "Forty Deuce." The song appears referential to both the Spider Murphy Gang and to "Jailhouse Rock", for the live version from 2006's "Bittersweet 16" includes a saxophone solo which the singer recalls having heard in Sing Sing prison.

== Band members ==
- Günther Sigl – Vocals/Bass
- Gerhard Gmell – Guitar
- Willie Duncan – Guitar/Bass/Lap Steel/Mandolin/Vocals
- Otto Staniloi – Sax
- Paul Dax – Drums
- Ludwig Seuss – Keys

== Discography ==
=== Albums ===
- Rock'n'Roll (1978)
- Rock'n'Roll Schuah (1980)
- Dolce Vita (1981)
- Tutti Frutti (1982)
- Spider Murphy Gang live! (1983)
- Scharf wia Peperoni (1984)
- Wahre Liebe (1985)
- Überdosis Rock'n'Roll (1987)
- In Flagranti (1989)
- Hokuspokus (1990)
- Greatest Hits (1990)
- Keine Lust auf schlechte Zeiten (1997)
- Rock'n'Roll Story (1997)
- Das komplette Konzert (1999)
- Radio Hitz (2002)
- Skandal im Lustspielhaus (2004)
