= Satin Jackets (musician) =

German musician

Tim Bernhardt, known professionally as Satin Jackets, is a German electronic music producer. He typically makes Nu-disco and Deep House music. He is known for his 2013 single "You Make Me Feel Good".

== Biography ==
Tim Bernhardt's musical career began in the late 1990s under various pseudonyms and in bands including Headphonism, Jeronimo, and Metrosoul. He achieved initial success with the band Lorenzo, founded with Joachim Schäfer in Dortmund and later joined by Linda Mathews.

Bernhardt returned in 2011 with Satin Jackets, exploring disco and inspired by Nile Rodgers of Chic and Trevor Horn.

Bernhardt achieved wider recognition with his 2013 single "You Make Me Feel Good". Vice described Bernhardt's music as "super sexy, irresistible house filled with a summer vibe".

In 2016, the album Panorama Pacifico was released, featuring Bernhardt's previous hits and adding vocals from Scavenger Hunt, NTEIBINT, and Marble Sounds, among others. Satin Jackets then became a major figure in the Nu-disco genre, totalling over 30 million streams on streaming platforms.

In 2019, Bernhardt released his second album, Solar Nights. This included collaborations with Panama, David Harks, Niya Wells, Emma Brammer & Anduze. Bernhardt described it as a refinement of his style: "Satin Jacket, but in 3D."

At the same time, Satin Jackets founded the band runSQ with the duo Blank & Jones.

Bernhardt says he retreats to a studio in the middle of a German forest to compose. He uses Ableton on an iMac, and various filters and dynamic processors like Elysia and SPL connected to a mixing desk. For his sets, he uses Maschine.

On stage, Bernhardt wears a distinctive mask designed by Australian designer Jason Wood, who also creates visuals for the Eskimo Recordings label. He wishes to be anonymous, including during his own performances.
