= Keepin It Real (Camoflauge album) =

Studio album by Camoflauge
- Released: August 27, 2002
- Recorded: 2002
- Genres: Southern hip-hop; gangsta rap
- Label: Pure Pain Records LLC

Camoflauge chronology
Strictly 4 da Streets: Drugs Sex and Violence, Vol. 1 (2001)	Keepin It Real (2002)

Keepin It Real is the final studio album by American rapper Camoflauge before his murder. It features Micnificent, T. Waters, HVP, Roam, Birdman, and Luc Duc.

== Track listing ==
1. KILL 187 FM (intro)
2. Down by the River
3. Food Stamps Welfare (featuring HVP)
4. Strictly 4 da Streets (featuring T. Waters)
5. Mind on My Mail
6. Layin My Stunt Down (featuring Birdman)
7. In Love With a Thug
8. Wanna Know Y
9. Hot Grits (featuring Micnificent)
10. All Eyes
11. Ghetto
12. Hustlin & Thuggin Daily (featuring HVP)
13. Free CD (skit)
14. Hey Hoe
15. Too Much Junk in You Trunk (interlude)
16. Bumpin My Sh*t
17. Bring it On (featuring Roam)
18. Professional (featuring Luc Duc)
19. Drama (remix)
20. All da Real Ni**az (outro)
21. ROAM (snippets)
