= Karl-Hermann Lüer =

German musician

Karl-Hermann Lüer (5 January 1933 – 2014) was a German saxophone and flute player. Born and raised just south of the German/Danish border, he first took up violin before moving on to clarinet and other woodwinds. During a holiday to Switzerland, he bought a recorder, which led him to his favourite instrument, the flute. He became active in the Hamburg music scene after moving there in 1961, finding work as a freelance session player with artists like Bert Kaempfert. In 1966, he joined the James Last Orchestra and remained a member until the 1990s. One of his most prestigious credits as a session musician was with the German progressive rock band Lucifer's Friend. He also did some arranging work, contributing charts to the James Last albums Non Stop Dancing 78 and World Hits. He cited Hubert Laws as an influence on his playing.
