= Pauline Decker =

German opera singer and composer (1811–1882)

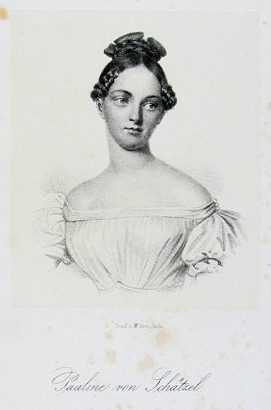
Pauline Decker, unmarked lithograph, around 1830

Pauline Decker, née von Schätzel, since 1863: von Decker (27 August 1811 – 13 September 1882) was a German opera singer (soprano) and composer.

== Biography ==
Born as Johanne Sophie Friederike Pauline von Schätzel on 27 August 1811 in Berlin, Pauline Decker comes from the Schätzel noble family. She was the daughter of the royal Soldin district administrator Carl Friedrich Ludwig von Schätzel and his wife Juliane Schick who was a soprano opera singer soprano with the Königliche Oper Berlin. She was a granddaughter of the famous German operatic soprano Margarete Luise Schick (1773–1810) who also performed at the Königliche Oper Berlin. Pauline studied music first from her mother. She was later trained by Heinrich Stümer (1789–1857), a noted German opera singer and composer.

At the age of 16, she made her debut in concert performances in 1827. She became a member of Berliner Singakademie in 1828. She was a soloist since 1829. In 1828 she debuted at the Königliche Oper and played her first role as Agathe in Carl Maria von Weber’s Der Freischütz. From 1828 to 1832, she was engagement at the Königliche Oper.

Following her marriage with Rudolf Ludwig Decker (1804–1877), a court printer and publisher, in 1832, she ended her musical career. However, she continued her concert performances, primarily at the Berliner Singakademie.

She was an honorary member of Berliner Singakademie from 1847 until her death in 1882. Pauline Decker composed several songs, which she published in the 1870s.

She died on 13 September 1882 in Eichberg near Schildau, Germany.
