= Not Profane =

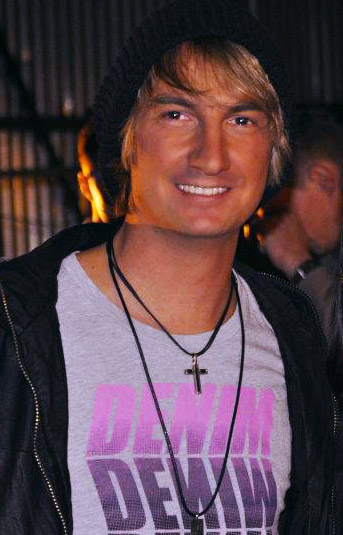
- Not Profane

Background information
- Origin: Karlsruhe, Germany
- Genres: Pop; Dance; R&B
- Occupations: Songwriter; Producer; Singer; YouTuber
- Years active: 2000–present
- Label: No Parade
- Website: www.notprofane.com

Not Profane is a German music producer, songwriter and singer. He is known for regularly posting music videos on his Not Profane Channel on YouTube.

As a songwriter he wrote the Top 40 single Somebody Who Loves Me for the Dutch artist Jeronimo van Ballegoijen (known as Jeronimo) and produced another song Unheard on his album. He also co-wrote Movie Star for American teen star Carson Lueders. As an artist he produced, wrote and released singles with Tiffany Alvord – Our Balloons, Sandra Cires – Riki Raka and the Canadian twin sisters Carmen and Camille – Little Bit Of Love. His music videos reached several million unique views on YouTube and were on MTV, Viva, Bild.de and Mc Donald's TV.

His studio and company No Parade is based in Karlsruhe, Germany and directed and produced the No. 1 MTV Black Charts music video Hell Yeah in California by DJ Rapture ft. Jonn Hart & Milla.

== Background ==
Not Profane grew up in Karlsruhe, Germany and graduated Bachelor of Arts 2009 from Popakademie Mannheim University with a degree in Popmusicdesign – Producer.

He started playing tennis at an early age and always wanted to become a professional tennis player till he fell in love with music at the age of seventeen, because his mother and sister bought a piano. Without ever having lessons he started writing/producing own songs just by ear. Besides loving playing (Padel) Tennis, he is a Christian, believing in Jesus/Christ. He often uses and refers to these quotes in statements/posts: If You Can Dream It, You Can Do It! or With God All Things Are Possible!

== Sound ==
His music/productions are primarily pop with urban/dance influences. He loves the work of songwriter and producer Max Martin and Dr. Luke. All of his productions start or include a specific whistle tone, which he only makes with his mouth sounding like a bird or police whistle.

== Career ==
=== Collaboration with – Caylana ===
In 2007 he got a DVD with TV Performances of a young girl from Bosnia-Herzegovina through a tennis friend. After watching the DVD he immediately flew Caylana to Germany to meet and record some demo tapes. Caylana was soon signed to his label and management company No Parade. Since then, they are working constantly on own original material in the studio.

In 2011, after Caylana moved to Germany, they started posting videos on YouTube. The first video was a cover of Nicole Scherzinger's Don't Hold Your Breath which has 445 thousand views to date and even gained interest by the management of Nicole Scherzinger. They are best known for their cover of Flo Rida and Sia's Wild Ones which has had more than 800.000 views as of 29 July 2012 Not Profane can count over 5 million views on his YouTube videos.

On 1 June 2012, Not Profane and Caylana released their first original single, Heart of a Lion written and produced by Not Profane on his record label No Parade. The video was directed, shot and cut almost entirely by himself. The song is lyrically related to sport and goals in life and was released one week before the UEFA Euro 2012 opening ceremony. The video appeared on several TV stations in Bosnia-Herzegovina and was also performed live on German TV.

On 14 December 2012, Caylana released her debut EP-Album, "Something 'Bout Love" including 8 tracks all written and produced by Not Profane. "Sing With Me", "Who I Am" and "Something 'Bout Love" are the latest singles that were released 2013 with an official music video on Not Profane's YouTube Channel.

=== Music and Fashion label, Video Production – No Parade ===
In 2012 he founded No Parade, a youth oriented music, video production company and fashion label with its premium headwear line, the Not Profane Caps. The first artists to manage are Caylana and Not Profane himself. No Parade is releasing songs digitally on over 300 online music stores worldwide like iTunes, Musicload, Amazon & Co and is also producing music videos for various artists.

=== Projects – songwriter/producer ===
Not Profane had writing sessions with Charlie Mason (Ashley Tisdale, Miley Cyrus), Michelle Leonard, (No Angels, Sarah Connor), and also did productions/remixes for Slim of 112, Ahmir (#1 R&B Group in Boston on YouTube).

Other credits, co-writes and productions include:

- Chris Meyer (Jörgen Elofsson | Co-Write)
- Jan van der Torn (NSYNC, Snoop Dogg | Co-Write)
- Anders Fernette ( Top 10 Sweden | Co-Write)
- Nanna Martorell (Monrose, Sistanova | Co-Write)
- Alan Glas (Liberty X, Earth Wind & Fire, Lighthouse Family | Co-Write)
- Maryanne Morgan (Mis-Teeq | Co-Write)
- Battlejuice ft. Atiba (Young Buck/G-Unit | Official Remix Production)
- Jesus on Extasy (#1 German Media Control Alternate Charts)
- Manuellsen (Album Production)
- Scola (Dru Hill | Official Remix Production)
- Kaye Styles (Album Production)
- No Angels (Pre-Demo-Production "Life is a miracle")

== Discography ==
Year	Title	Label	Track(s)	Writer(s)	Producer(s)
2012	Heart of a Lion ft. Caylana – Single	No Parade	Heart of a Lion	Not Profane	Not Profane
2013	All in My Head – Single	No Parade	All in My Head	Not Profane	Not Profane
2015	The Last – Single	No Parade	1. The Last; 2. The Last Acoustic; 3. It Will Be Given To You	Not Profane; Not Profane; Not Profane	Not Profane
2015	Summer Love ft. Violent Electric – Single	No Parade	Summer Love	Not Profane	Not Profane
2015	Riki Raka ft. Sandra Cires – Single	No Parade	Riki Raka	Not Profane · Sanda Cires	Not Profane
2016	This Moment Now – EP	No Parade	1. Our Balloons ft. Tiffany Alvord; 2. Little Bit Of Love ft. Carmen and Camille; 3. Running Around in Circles; 4. This Moment Now	Not Profane; Not Profane · Carmen and Camille; Not Profane; Not Profane	Not Profane
2016	Little Bit Of Love – Single	No Parade	1. Little Bit Of Love ft. Carmen and Camille; 2. Little Bit Of Love Remix ft. Carmen and Camille	Not Profane · Carmen and Camille; Not Profane · Carmen and Camille	Not Profane
