= Georg Amft =

German composer and music teacher

Georg Amft (25 January 1873 – 9 March 1937) was a German composer and music teacher. He was known especially for sacred and secular choral music, including orchestral masses, and also researched the folk songs and regional history of the County of Glatz in Silesia. He was born in Oberhannsdorf in the German Empire (now Jaszkowa Górna in Poland). He died in Bad Altheide, Germany (now Polanica-Zdrój in Poland).
