= Keepin' It Real (C-Block album) =

Studio album by C-Block
- Released: 11 December 1998
- Genre: Hip hop, electronic
- Label: Maad/Warner

C-Block chronology
General Population (1997)	Keepin' It Real (1998)	Changes/The Last (2010)

Keepin' It Real is the second album of German hip-hop group C-Block, released in 1998.

== Track listing ==
No.	Title	Producer(s)	Length
1.	"Intro"	Frank Müller, Ulrich Buchmann, Jörg Wagner	1:40
2.	"Broken Wings (Extended Version)"		5:10
3.	"We Believe"		4:48
4.	"Eternal Grace (Extended Beat Mix)"		4:30
5.	"Motherless Child"		4:58
6.	"Life Goes On (Interlude)"		1:55
7.	"Keepin' It Real"		3:50
8.	"Playa Hata"		5:30
9.	"Ghetto Generation"		5:10
10.	"Bounce"		4:24
11.	"Mama Please"		3:52
12.	"You Win Again"		4:08
13.	"First Love"		4:02
14.	"Eternal Grace (Classic Radio Mix)"		3:52

== Chart ==
Chart (1998)	Peak position
German Albums (Offizielle Top 100)	45
Hungarian Albums (MAHASZ)	17
Swiss Albums (Schweizer Hitparade)	34
