= Anna Depenbusch =

German singer and musician

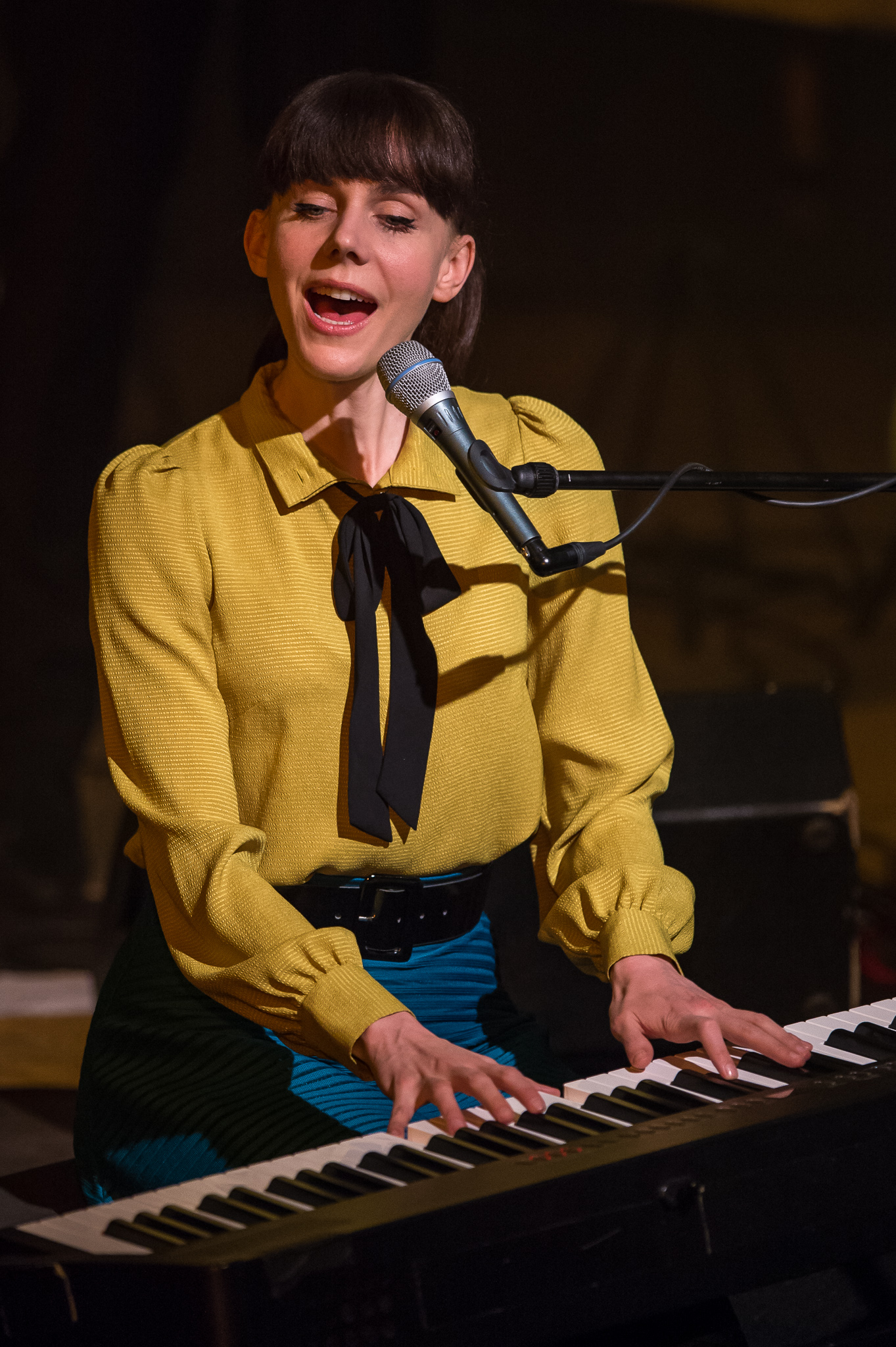
- Anna Depenbusch (2017)

Background information
- Also known as: Ella Larsson, Anastasica
- Born: 17 October 1977 (age 49); Hamburg, West Germany (now Germany)
- Genres: Pop, chanson, jazz
- Occupations: Singer, composer
- Instruments: Vocals, piano
- Years active: 2000–present
- Labels: Rintintin, Sony
- Formerly of: Orange Blue
- Website: annadepenbusch.de

Anna Depenbusch (German pronunciation: [ˈʔana ˈdeːpm̩ˌbʊʃ]; born 17 October 1977) is a German singer and musician.

== Career ==
Prior to her solo career, she was a background singer for a group called Orange Blue,

In 2002 and 2003, she contributed vocals to several albums by Max Melvin under the name "Anastasica".

In 2005, she released her first album that united elements of pop, jazz, and chanson. The song "Heimat" (Home) from this album was nominated for the German music writing prize (Deutschen Musikautorenpreis).

Her second album, The Mathematics of Anna Depenbusch (2011) reached No. 25 in the charts.

In February 2025, a fire under her apartment destroyed her studio. The music for her planned album, which she intended to tour with the Kaiser Quartet, was lost. However, the tour went ahead as planned.

== Discography ==
- Ins Gesicht (Rintintin, 2005)
- Die Mathematik Der Anna Depenbusch (105 Music, 2011)
- Die Mathematik Der Anna Depenbusch in schwarz-weiß (105 Music, 2011)
- Sommer Aus Papier (105 Music, 2012)
- Das Alphabet der Anna Depenbusch (Columbia, 2017)
- Das Alphabet der Anna Depenbusch in schwarz-weiß (Sony/Columbia, 2018)
- Echtzeit (2020, Liedland Records)

=== Singles ===
- "Tango" (2005, Rintintin)
- "Heimat" (2007, Rintintin)
- "Wir sind Hollywood" (2010, 105 music)
- "Benjamin" (2012, 105 music)
- "Herzlich Willkommen"
