= Jenson McKenzie =

German band

- Origin: Mannheim, Germany
- Genres: Rock
- Years active: 2012–present
- Members: Jens Volpp; Yuriy Davygora; Fabian Franz; Marco Dick
- Website: facebook.com/JensonMcKenzie

Jenson McKenzie are a German rock band formed in Mannheim in 2012, consisting of Jens Volpp (lead guitar), Yuriy Davygora (vocals, rhythm guitar), Fabian Franz (drums) and Marco Dick (bass guitar, vocals). Their music is influenced by bands like Queen and Guns N' Roses. Jenson McKenzie are incorporating different styles in their music, most of which were popular in the 1980s.

== History ==
In March 2012, guitarist Jens Volpp, a mechanical engineering student at the Mannheim University of Applied Sciences placed an advertisement on the notice board of the university for founding a "hard rock/indie rock band". The same advertisement was also placed at the University of Heidelberg, where Yuriy Davygora was a graduate student of particle physics. Davygora contacted Volpp and they met for an open jam session at the O-Ton club in Mannheim. During their second meeting, on 18 April, they decided to found a band together and call it "Jenson McKenzie".

At first, Jenson McKenzie performed as an acoustic duo act, Volpp playing lead guitar and Davygora providing vocals and playing rhythm guitar. Their first concert on 4 July 2012 was a part of the open stage night at the Zeltfestival 2012 in Heidelberg, where they played songs which they had written separately before meeting each other including, most notably, Spring Blues and The Science Goes On.

After that, Davygora and Volpp started writing new material together and also looking for a bass-guitarist and a drummer. They had several more performances in 2012 (some of them with guest musicians) including, most notably, the concert at the newcomer festival in Weinheim on 8 December which was the first Jenson McKenzie concert with electric instruments.

As of 15 December 2012, Jenson McKenzie have a full four-men line-up. They were joined by drummer Fabian Franz and bass-guitarist Marco Dick. In 2013, the band will start recording their (still untitled) debut album.

== Musical style ==
Jenson McKenzie refer to themselves as a rock'n'roll/classic rock/hard rock band. They drew artistic influence from rock acts like Queen, Guns N' Roses, The Who, Scorpions, DIO, etc. They compose songs inspired by different musical genres including rock'n'roll, pop rock, punk rock, hard rock, heavy metal, folk and others. Guitarist Jens Volpp is mainly influenced by Slash which is reflected in his style of playing.

== Band members ==
Current members

- Jens Volpp – lead guitar (2012–present)
- Yuriy Davygora – vocals, rhythm guitar (2012–present)
- Fabian Franz - drums (2012–present)
- Marco Dick - bass guitar, vocals (2012–present)

Early members

- Therese Kächele - bass guitar (2012)

Timeline

== Discography ==
- TBA (2013)
