= Geier Sturzflug =

German musical group

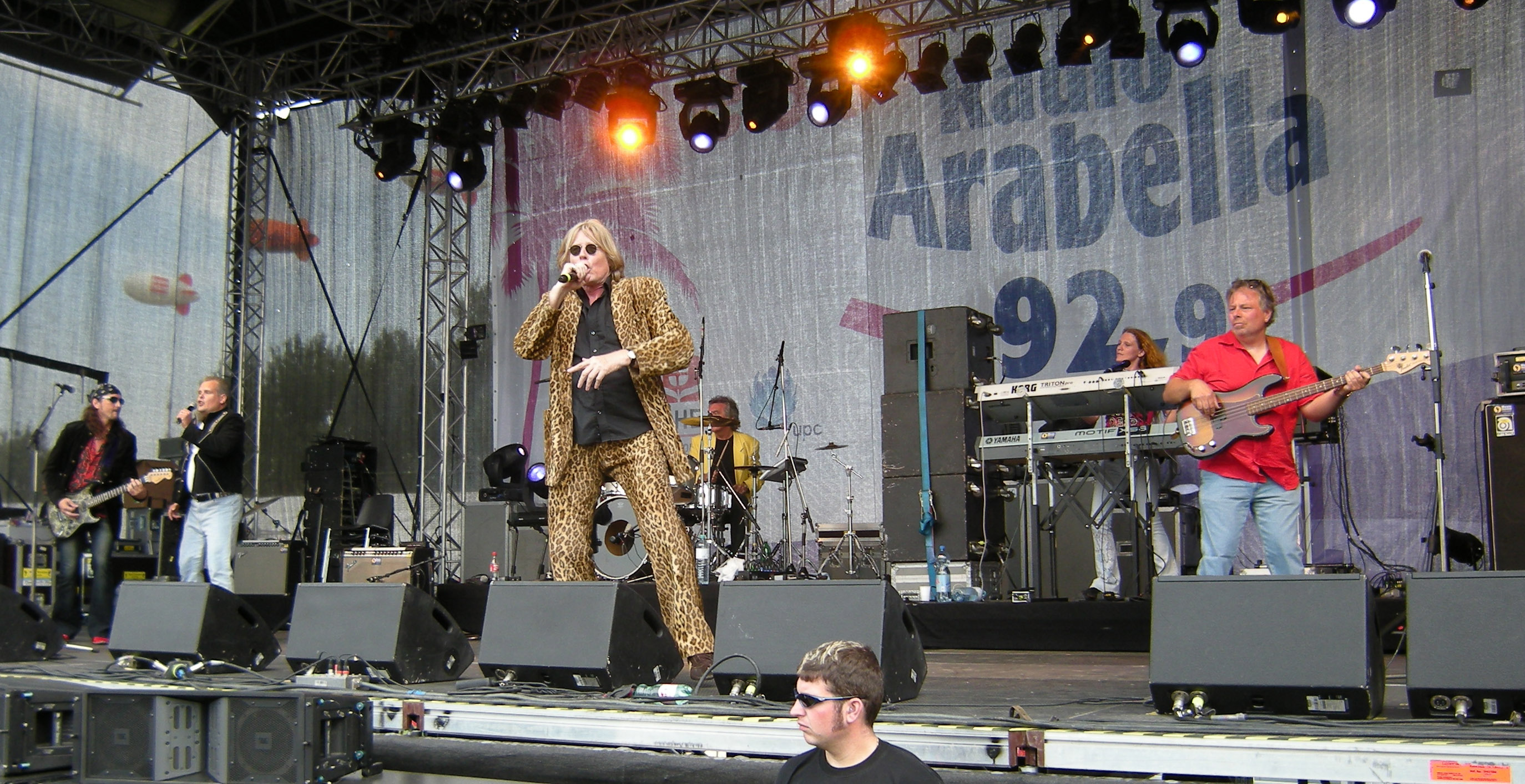
- Geier Sturzflug in 2010

Background information
- Origin: Bochum
- Genres: Neue Deutsche Welle, Deutschrock, ska, reggae, disco-Schlager
- Past members: Friedel Geratsch; Werner Borowski; Uwe Kellerhoff; Michael Volkmann; Klaus Fiehe; Deff Ballin

Geier Sturzflug (Lit. "Vulture Nosedive") is a German musical group of the Neue Deutsche Welle genre, created in 1979, and probably best known for their hits "Bruttosozialprodukt" (Gross national product), "Pure Lust am Leben," "Einsamkeit," and "Besuchen Sie Europa." The first of these was number one in Germany for the entire month of May 1983. Stylistically they combine music styles of rock, pop, ska, and jazz with cynical lyrics.

== Discography ==
Runtergekommen (1981)

A1. Schotter Blau bebündelt (2:10)
A2. Sänger inner Band (2:26)
A3. Reggae im Ruhrgebiet (3:35)
A4. Marihuana (3:27)
A5. Glückliche Familie (3:33)
A6. Tacken für de Raupe (2:12)
B1. Mokkadischu (4:51)
B2. Heiße Liebe (2:55)
B3. Lebkuchenherz (2:34)
B4. Diese Welt (3:43)
B5. Wieder eine Nacht (3:20)

Heiße Zeiten (1983)

A1. Besuchen Sie Europa (solange es noch steht) (2:35)
A2. Karibische Gefühle (5:07)
A3. Seemannslied (2:53)
A4. Walkmanfan (1:55)
A5. Der moderne Mensch (2:52)
A6. Halli Galli (2:19)
B1. Des kleinen Mannes Sonnenschein (2:30)
B2. Bruttosozialprodukt (3:00)
B3. Korken auf dem Wasser (3:33)
B4. Harte Zeiten (3:47)
B5. Halt mich fest (4:16)

CD-Bonus tracks:

12. Früher oder später
13. Küß mich, Good-Bye
14. Alle Amis singen Olala
15. Friedel Geratsch: Zurück in die Nacht

Dreimal täglich (1984)

A1. Bilder aus der Wirklichkeit(2:16)
A2. Groß und klein(2:55)
A3. Alle Amis(2:25)
A4. Einsamkeit(2:50)
A5. Euroshima(3:12)
A6. Brich mir nicht das Herz(4:09)
B1. Doktor Doktor(3:00)
B2. Musikbox(3:04)
B3. Mein Herz(3:46)
B4. Skandal(2:21)
B5. Wir sind die Leute(2:46)

Pure Lust am Leben (1984)

A1. Pure Lust am Leben(3:25)
B1. Küß mich, good bye(3:09)

Einsamkeit (1984)

A1. Einsamkeit (2:57)
B1. Hühnerhugo (3:16)

Alle Amis singen olala (1984)

A1. Alle Amis singen olala(2:43)
B1. Musikbox(3:04)

Das Beste von Geier Sturzflug (1993, Best Of)

1. Bruttosozialprodukt (3:00)
2. Einsamkeit (2:50)
3. Pure Lust am Leben (3:25)
4. Alle Amis (2.25)
5. Wir sind die Leute (2:55)
6. Halt mich fest (4:16)
7. Küss mich, Good-Bye (3:09)
8. Bilder aus der Wirklichkeit (2:16)
9. Gross und klein (2:55)
10. Euroshima (3:12)
11. Brich mir nicht das Herz (4:09)
12. Musikbox (3:04)
13. Skandal (2:35)
14. Besuchen sie Europa (solange es noch steht) (2:35)
15. Karibische Gefühle (5:07)
16. Des kleinen Mannes Sonnenschein (2:30)
17. Harte Zeiten (3:47)

Hit Revue

1. Hit Revue (Radio Mix, 3:16)
2. Hit Revue (Langer Mix, 7:13)
3. Hasse ma 'ne Mark? (3:41)
4. Wolfgang (0:10)

Lust am Leben (2001, Best Of)

1. Pure Lust am Leben (3:25)
2. Wir sind die Leute (2:55)
3. Halt mich fest (4:16)
4. Einsamkeit (2:50)
5. Musikbox (3:04)
6. Alle Amis (2:25)
7. Reggae im Ruhrgebiet (3:35)
8. Bruttosozialprodukt (3:00)
9. Euroshima (3:12)
10. Marihuana (3:27)
11. Harte Zeiten (3:47)
12. Karibische Gefühle (5:07)
13. Besuchen Sie Europa (solange es noch steht) (2:35)
14. Skandal (2:21)
15. Mokkadischu (4:51)
16. Diese Welt (3:43)
17. Küss mich, Good-Bye (3:09)
18. Bilder aus der Wirklichkeit (2:16)

Die Geier Fliegen Tief! : (Released 31 May 2005*)

1. Bruttosozialprodukt
2. Pure Lust am Leben
3. Einsamkeit '99
4. Besuchen sie Europa
5. Wolfgang
6. Ruhrgebiet
7. Bruttosozialprodukt (Karaoke Version)
8. Pure Lust am Leben (Karaoke Version)
9. Einsamkeit (Karaoke Version)
10. Besuchen sie Europa (Karaoke Version)

Mahlzeit! : (Released 11 March 2006*)

1. Geschüttelt nicht gerührt
2. Wir müssen lernen faul zu sein
3. Weil es nie zu Ende ist
4. Das spanische Zimmer
5. Schlaflose Igel
6. Ein Stern fällt in die Nacht
7. Gute Schuhe
8. Schöner vorgestellt
9. Arbeitslos
10. Schwarzarbeit
11. Jetzt ist die Wirtschafft dran
12. Bruttosozialprodukt
13. Besuchen sie Europa
14. Pure Lust am Leben

Klempner beim Reaktor : (Released 2 November 2007*)

1. Klempner beim Reaktor
2. Besuchen Sie Europa 2006

Hör auf zu weinen : (Released 16 March 2009*)

1. Wie ein Eisbär sein
2. Mein kleines Herz
3. Die Olive
4. Der kleine Korken
5. Träumen
6. Shalala
7. Ich bin da
8. Kurze Hemden
9. Sehnsucht nacht Sehnsucht
10. Hör auf zu weinen
11. Und die Zeit vergeht

Die Zeit unseres Lebens - Single : (Released 21 August 2009*)

1. Die Zeit unseres Lebens (Single Edit)
2. Die Zeit unseres Lebens (NDW Edit)

Heute Nacht hab ich geträumt - Single : (Released 5 February 2010*)

1. Heute Nacht hab ich geträumt (Single Edit)
2. Heute Nacht hab ich geträumt (Karaoke Version)

Brigitte, bitte! (Die Zigarette) [feat. Papaoke] - Single : (Released 8 April 2010*)

1. Brigitte, bitte! (Die Zigarette) (Radio Mix)
2. Brigitte, bitte! (Die Zigarette) (Party Mix)

Meine besten : (Released 4 June 2010*)

1. Arbeitslos
2. Schwarzarbeit
3. Rundfunkverbot
4. Geschüttelt nicht gerührt
5. Wir müssen lernen faul zu sein
6. Ein Stern fällt in die Nacht
7. Pure Lust am Leben
8. Gute Schuhe
9. Schöner Vorgestellt
10. Bruttosozialprodukt
11. Besuchen sie Europa
12. Klempner beim Reaktor
13. Schlaflose Igel
14. Weil es nie zu Ende ist
15. Jetzt ist die Wirtschafft dran
16. Das spanische Zimmer

Heiss wie die Sonne : (Released 25 June 2010*)

1. Heiss wie die Sonne (Party-Mix)
2. Heiss wie die Sonne (Single Edit)
3. Heiss wie die Sonne (Karaoke)

- The release dates of the albums with stars next to them are according to iTunes, so that probably means that was when they were released onto iTunes and not the release date of the actual CDs to the public

== See also ==
- Neue Deutsche Welle
