= C-Block =

German hip-hop group

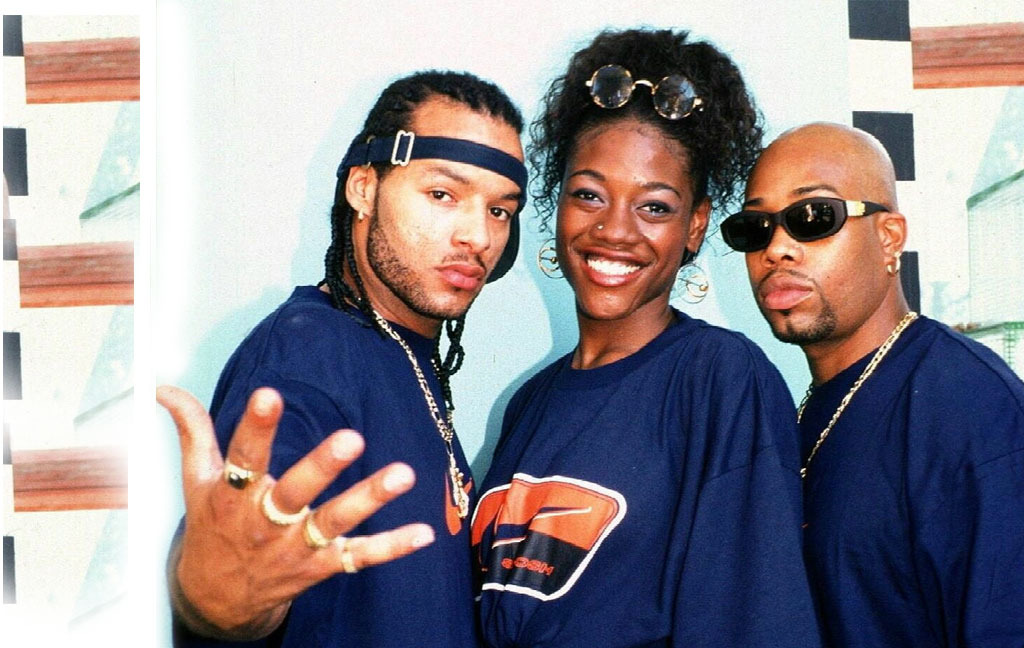
- Original C-Block lineup

Background information
- Origin: Germany
- Genre: Hip-Hop
- Years active: 1995–present
- Labels: Maad Records/WEA; Dance Division; DunaBeats
- Members: Franky Miller; Dante Thomas; Bella
- Past members: Red Dogg; Mr. P Raquel Gomez, Theresa "Misty" Baltimore; Preston "Goldie" Holloway; Jeanine Love; Elena Nikolaeva

C-Block were a German hip-hop group, founded in 1995 by German music producers Frank Müller and Jörg Wagner. The group has been fronted by American rapper/singer Anthony "Red Dogg" Joseph and James "Mr.P" White.

C-Block were a well-known hip hop act in Europe in the 1990s, who along with Down Low and Nana, signified the rise of the American-influenced rap music in Europe. In the 2020s plans to revive the group were announced.

== Biography ==
Since producer-driven, vocalist-fronted musical projects such as Snap! and C+C Music Factory had remarkable success in the early 1990s, producers Frank Müller, Ulrich Buchmann and Jörg Wagner decided to put together such a group in 1995.

The Persian Gulf War had ended in 1991 and former American soldiers who were stationed and based in Germany remained after their deployments and service in the armed forces ended. Some were musicians with musical ambitions. They now found themselves with the time and opportunity and were willing to try a musical career in Germany. Anthony "Red Dogg" Joseph and James "Mr.P" White met under such circumstances and were recruited by Frank Müller to become part of his newly created musical project.

They chose the name "C-Block" and released their debut single, "Shake Dat Azz", a collaboration with Chicago rapper A.K.-S.W.I.F.T. in late 1996, which made a lasting impression on their European fan base. However, their greatest hits were only ahead of them at the time. "So Strung Out", featuring Raquel Gomez-Rey, a more rap-oriented single, was released as their sophomore effort and catapulted the group to European superstardom. Based on a Soul Searchers sample, already made famous by Eric B. & Rakim and Run-DMC, called "Ashley's Roachclip", "So Strung Out" was a soulful ode to drug victims across the world and had a lasting impact in the European rap community.

Unfulfilled plans of a solo career made Mr.P leave the group in late 1997, being replaced by until then less visible project members and fellow compatriots Theresa "Misty" Baltimore and Preston "Goldie Gold" Holloway who had only recorded backing vocals and choruses for the C-Block debut album, General Population, released in 1997. They all quit the project after the more pop-oriented, less successful second album, called "Keepin' It Real".

Mr.P returned to the group and tried to make a comeback with newly recruited R&B singer Jeanine Love. The released singles failed to make an impact commercially or critically and the group officially disbanded in late 2000.

Frank Müller, one of the creators and producers of the group, released the group's third, shelved, album in late 2010 on the Internet.

New promo single by F Base present's: Mr.P "Here we Go" was released on 15 June 2019.

New demo single by F Base feat. Mr.P "Cool Breeze" was released on 8 March 2020

Frank Müller announced in July 2023 through his Budapest label, Duna Beats, that C-Block will return to the stage with a new lineup. The plans were in progress for 2024. The joint project C-Block Summertime with Charming Horses will be released on August 11, 2023, at 2:00 PM CET

According to the C-Block label, the formation originally launched by C-Block founder Franky Miller in 1995 has continued since 2026 under the name FM C-Block Project with Elena Nikolaeva and Franky Miller, and has resumed live appearances. According to the label, castings are currently being held for an authorized C-Block Legacy Project, and discussions are being conducted with Rob Money in this regard.

After talks with Rob Money ultimately fell through and Elena Nikolaeva withdrew from C-BLOCK for family reasons, the label Duna Beats was able to bring US superstar Dante Thomas, best known for his worldwide hit “Miss California,” on board, together with the vocally outstanding Bella.

With this new line-up, C-BLOCK returned to its original format, combining rap passages with the new material that was created since 2015. After 23 years, the absence of the genuine C-BLOCK from the live stage finally came to an end.

Dante Thomas, Franky Miller and Bella have announced the release of the new C-BLOCK song “Phoenix” for December 11, 2026. The song symbolizes the rebirth of C-BLOCK following Dante Thomas arrival in the group.

== Discography ==
=== Albums ===
Year	Title	Peak chart positions				
Year	Title	AUT	FIN	GER	HU	SWI
1997	General Population	41	17	14	6	10
1998	Keepin' It Real	-	-	45	17	34

=== Singles ===
Year	Title	Peak chart positions				
Year	Title	AUT	FIN	GER	SWE	SWI
1996	"Shake Dat Azz"	-	-	-	-	-
1996	"So Strung Out"	14	7	4	-	7
1997	"Time Is Tickin' Away"	16	12	5	40	9
1997	"Summertime"	-	-	19	-	-
1997	"Eternal Grace"	-	-	8	-	20
1998	"Broken Wings"	-	-	27	-	31
1999	"Keep Movin'"	-	-	66	-	-
2000	"The Future Is So Bright"	-	-	-	-	-
