= Fuckin Wild =

German rock band

- Origin: Munich, Germany
- Genres: Folk rock, World Music, Blues, Progressive rock, Psychedelic rock
- Years active: 1993–1998
- Labels: Artvoice
- Members: Rochus Honold; Anja Fritzsche; Frank Daiminger; Tobias Teschner
- Website: http://fuckinwild.mikroh.de/

Fuckin Wild was a German rock band with blues, progressive rock, folk and Middle Eastern influences. The band occasionally called its style Psychedelischer Rausch Rock. Active mainly in Bavaria and the rest of Germany between 1993 and 1998, Fuckin Wild produced three albums; the second titled The Raven's Cry was released by Artvoice Music in 1996 and distributed mainly in Germany and Great Britain.

Fuckin Wild toured Germany between 1993 and 1998, when the band was abandoned due to personal differences among the members.

== History ==
=== Formation and the first cast (1993–1995) ===
Fuckin Wild was formed in 1993 by Rochus Honold, Anja Fritzsche, Martin Kaußler and Günter Kriz after breaking away from their former bands Red Baron and The Lovers. They produced their first demo album Live fast, love hard and get into the boogie in 1993 and started touring mainly in the region of Bavaria. After Martin Kaußler and Günter Kriz left the band in 1995 they were replaced by Frank Daiminger and Tobias Teschner.

=== The second cast (1995–1998) ===
After these people changes, the band started producing their second album called The Raven's Cry, which was released by German label Artvoice Music and distributed throughout Germany and to some extent to other European countries. After finishing the studio works the band started touring again all over Germany, where the live recordings for their third album took place. When in 1997 Tobias Teschner left the band he was replaced by Philipp Roos, but only one year later the band broke up due to personal and musical differences between the members.

=== Post-breakup (1998–present) ===
Anja Fritzsche released two solo albums that partly consisted of acoustic versions of former Fuckin Wild songs.

== Members ==
- Rochus Honold -- guitar, oud, mandolin, harp
- Anja Fritzsche -- vocals, acoustic guitar, djembe
- Frank Daiminger -- Bass guitar, percussion
- Tobias Teschner -- drums, percussion

== Discography ==
Live fast, love hard and get into the boogie

- Released: 1993
- Label: Summerhouse

The Raven's Cry

- Released: 1996
- Label: Artvoice Music

Live Autumn 1997

- Released: 1997

== Press review ==
- Review by Wolfgang Pokall in German Rock e.V. Rock News issue 5/1998
