= Tichelaar =

Tichelaar is a Dutch occupational surname meaning "tile / brick maker". Among variant forms are Tigchelaar, Tigelaar, Tichgelaar, and Tiggelaar. People with this name include:

Tichelaar

- Jacques Tichelaar (born 1953), Dutch politician
- Paul Tichelaar (born 1982), Canadian athlete
- Willem Tichelaar (1642–c.1714), Dutch barber false accuser of Cornelis and Johan de Witt

Tigchelaar

- Eibert Tigchelaar (born 1959), Dutch biblical scholar and Dead Sea Scrolls expert
- Sippie Tigchelaar (born 1952), Dutch speed skater

== See also ==
- Royal Tichelaar Makkum, Dutch pottery company
- Nicola Tiggeler (born 1960), German actress, singer, and dancer
