= Storm of Love =

German television soap opera

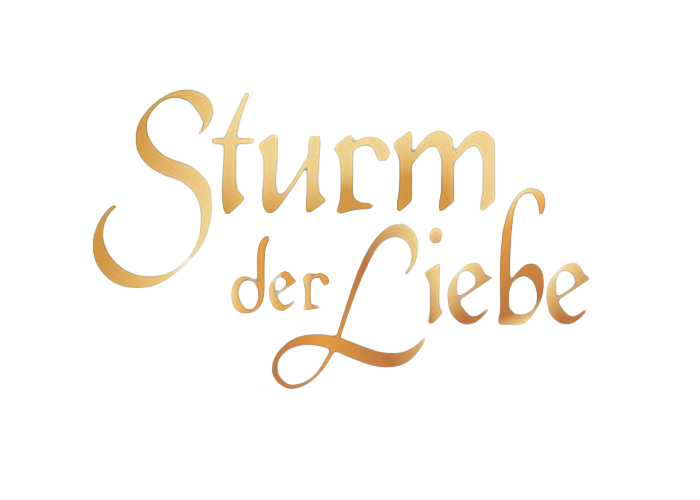
- Sturm der Liebe
- Genre: Soap opera
- Created by: Bea Schmidt
- Written by: Claudia Köhler
- Starring: Various
- Theme music composer: Leslie Mandoki; Laszlo Bencker
- Opening theme: "Stay" by Curly
- Country of origin: Germany
- Original language: German
- No. of seasons: 23
- No. of episodes: 4695

Production
- Executive producer: Marcus Ammonn
- Running time: 50 minutes
- Production company: Bavaria Film

Original release
- Network: Das Erste
- Release: 26 September 2005 – present

Sturm der Liebe (pronounced [ˌʃtʊɐ̯m deːɐ̯ ˈliːbə], lit. "Storm of Love") is a German television soap opera created by Bea Schmidt for Das Erste. It premiered on 26 September 2005. It airs 50-minute episodes on weekdays (Monday through Friday) at 15:10. It was announced in May 2024 that Sturm der Liebe has been renewed until 2027 and that its runtime will be shortened to 25 minutes starting in 2025. In July 2024, it was announced the programme's running time would remain 50 minutes.

== Plot ==
The series takes place mainly in the fictional five-star hotel called the Hotel Fürstenhof and the fictional village in which it is located, Bichelheim. Bichelheim is located in the fictional district Bichelheim-Krauting, which is located in Bavaria. The protagonists, known as the Dream Couple, are the main focus of each season. However, storylines also revolve around the many trials, tribulations and love affairs of the village residents, mainly the hotel employees and the owners of the hotel, the Saalfeld family.

== Seasons ==
Note: These summaries only focuses on the plot of the protagonists.

=== Season 1: Laura Mahler and Alexander Saalfeld ===
Handsome, charming Alexander Saalfeld is the eldest son of Werner and Charlotte Saalfeld and one of the heirs to the Hotel Fürstenhof. One day he meets the beautiful Laura Mahler in a park in Munich. The pair spend a magical day together and then part ways. Laura is hired as a pastry chef at the Fürstenhof and comes face to face with Alexander. They begin seeing each other and fall madly in love. However, Alexander and Laura both get the shock of their lives when it is revealed that Werner Saalfeld is also Laura's father! That means Alexander and Laura are half-siblings and their relationship is now forbidden. Laura meets Christian Deville, whose wife, Sophia, is in a coma at the local hospital. Alexander reunites with his ex-fiancée Katherina Klinker-Emden. Alexander is still in love with Laura, but marries Katherina, hoping it will finally help him move on. Unbeknownst to Laura and Alexander, Saalfeld family friend, Alfons Sonnbichler, has discovered he is actually Alexander's biological father, which means they are not siblings after all.

After Christian's wife passes away, he and Laura begin seeing each other. Laura and Alexander become overwhelmed with their feelings for each other and sleep together. Laura is disgusted that she slept with her "brother," but Alexander has no regrets and feels he is meant to be with Laura. Eventually, Christian reveals to Laura his name is actually Gregor Bergmeister and Sophia was his girlfriend not his wife. It turns out the real Christian Deville was Sophia's husband who she killed in self-defense and whose body Gregor helped dispose of. Laura is understanding and gives Gregor the courage to turn himself in, which he does and receives a suspended sentence. Gregor proposes to Laura and she accepts. Laura is horrified to find out she is pregnant since the baby might be the product of incest. When Laura confesses to sleeping with Alexander, Gregor calls off their engagement, but eventually agrees to stand by her.

Gregor overhears Alfons confessing in church that he is Alexander's father. Gregor tells Laura the truth about Alexander's paternity and she in turn tells Alexander. Alexander feels betrayed by his family for not telling him the truth, especially since it kept him and Laura apart. Since she now knows Alexander is not her brother and Alexander's marriage to Katherina has ended, Laura now must choose between Gregor and Alexander. Laura knows Alexander is the love of her life and leaves a heartbroken Gregor for him. Laura and Alexander are over the moon to finally be together with no obstacles. They become engaged and look forward to the birth of their child. On their wedding day, Laura is kidnapped by Alexander's psychotic ex, Helen Marinelli. Thankfully, she is rescued by Alexander. The pair are finally married and leave to start a new life in Brussels. A few months later, their daughter is born and named Hannah. They later have a son named Peter, nicknamed Leander.

Alexander has come for several visits over the years. In 2010, Alexander and Laura returned for the Fürstenhof's anniversary celebration. In 2018, he returned for Werner's 75th birthday, along with all of his siblings. In 2025, he returned with his son Leander to officiate Alfons and Hildegard's vow renewal. He alsp revealed he has an illegitimate son, Massimo Foghetti, the product of a fling he had with an Italian woman while on a school trip in South Tyrol when he was 17 years old.

=== Season 2: Miriam von Heidenberg and Robert Saalfeld ===
Lovable rascal Robert Saalfeld is the only biological child of Werner and Charlotte Saalfeld. While his parents and older brother, Alexander, are more business-minded, Robert is more creative and works as the head chef of the Fürstenhof. His first love was Alfons and Hildegard's daughter, Marie. Their on-off relationship deteriorates over time and it ends for good after Marie has a miscarriage.

One day, he meets the beautiful Miriam von Heidenberg in the forest while she is riding a horse and instantly falls in love with her. He is later shocked to find out Miriam is in a wheelchair, but he soon realises that it does not matter. Miriam was deeply affected by her death of her father, Wolfgang, and is under the tight control of stepmother, Barbara. She and Robert begin a beautiful romance and become engaged. With Robert's love and support, Miriam becomes able to walk again. Barbara is determined to destroy Robert and Miriam's happiness, because if Miriam marries before her 25th birthday she inherits Wolfgang's estate, but if she does not, Barbara inherits it. Miriam is close with her childhood friend Felix Tarrasch, which Robert is not happy about. Eventually, Robert and Miriam separate and Miriam starts a relationship with Felix. To get her inheritance, Felix and Miriam elope. Miriam cannot deny her love for Robert and leaves Felix to reunite with him. Barbara confesses that she murdered Miriam's father and tries to kill Miriam, Robert and Werner. Luckily, they are able to save themselves and Barbara (supposedly) dies. Since she is still married to Felix, Miriam and Robert have a symbolic wedding. Afterwards they move to Paris, where Robert will work as a chef in his own restaurant and Miriam will be a perfumer.

A few months later, Miriam returns to Bichelheim to finalise her divorce from Felix. She and Robert marry in Paris. Some time later, Miriam tragically dies giving birth to her and Robert's daughter, Valentina. Her death leaves her loved ones heartbroken. Robert tearfully buries his beloved wife in Bichelheim. Miriam's legacy lives on through her daughter Valentina and the love she shared with Robert.

=== Season 3: Samia Obote and Gregor Bergmeister ===
Samia Obote traveled illegally to Germany from Uganda to hide from her domineering father, Joshua, who wants to force her into an arranged marriage. She finds refuge at the Fürstenhof, where she finds work and makes friends. She dates Felix Tarrasch for some time before she falls in love with her friend, Dr. Gregor Bergmeister. Gregor is happily in a relationship with Leonie Preisinger and is oblivious to Samia's feelings for him. Gregor and Leonie's relationship ends when she has an affair with Marc Kohlweyer. Gregor finally realises he is in love with Samia. Gregor stops Samia from going back to Uganda with her father by declaring his love for her and they start a relationship. Joshua is not happy about Gregor and Samia's relationship and is determined to put a stop to it. Joshua is killed by Fiona Marquardt, but suspicion falls on Gregor, which tears him and Samia apart. Gregor begins dating the investigating detective, Jana Schneider. Samia enters into a liaison with André Konopka's son, Simon and they become engaged. Jana becomes pregnant, but suffers a miscarriage. Gregor and Jana later split up. On the day of her wedding to Simon, Samia realises Gregor is her true love and calls off the wedding. Samia and Gregor finally reunite and Gregor proposes. The pair exchange vows in a romantic ceremony on board a steamer. Afterwards, they set off for a new life in Tanzania.

=== Season 4: Emma Strobl and Felix Saalfeld ===
Felix Tarrasch discovers his biological parents are Johann Gruber and Elisabeth Saalfeld, making him part of the wealthy Saalfeld family. Felix changes his surname to Saalfeld and takes his place in the family. Emma Strobl, a chambermaid at the Fürstenhof, falls in love with Felix. However, Felix falls in love with Emma's scheming half-sister, Rosalie Engel. Rosalie is interested in the Saalfeld money, so she is happy to be with Felix and is determined to not let anything go wrong between them. It takes Felix months to understand that Rosalie is just taking advantage of him, and he also starts to develop feelings for Emma. In the meantime, Emma enters into a relationship with Ben Sponheim. Ben's biological mother is Barbara von Heidenberg, who was presumed dead, but now has returned to Bichelheim seeking revenge against Werner Saalfeld. Barbara drives Werner crazy with a poison that will make him forgetful. When she is exposed by Emma, she locks her and Felix in a power plant, where the two confess their love to each other. They are rescued and separate from their partners. Ben accepts that he can't keep Emma, but Rosalie refuses to let Felix go and fakes a pregnancy to hold onto him. Initially, Felix wants to marry Rosalie to be a responsible father, but then decides he cannot leave Emma. Ben eventually reveals Rosalie is faking her pregnancy, leaving no more obstacles for Felix and Emma's happy ending. Felix and Emma have a beautiful wedding in Austria. In the hustle and bustle of the wedding, Rosalie manages to get into a car with Emma and wants to kill Emma and herself. Despite all of Rosalie's misdeeds, Emma finds loving words for her sister and Rosalie abandons her plan. Emma and Felix marry and leave for Canada, where they can be close to Johann.

The following winter, Felix and Emma, who is now pregnant, pay a short visit to Bichelheim to see Rosalie, who has fallen into a coma. Back in Canada, Emma gives birth to their twin sons, Max and Moritz.

=== Season 5: Sandra Ostermeyer and Lukas Zastrow ===
A shocking Saalfeld family secret comes to light: on the orders of Ludwig Saalfeld, Dr. Korbinian Niederbühl swapped Ludwig's newborn daughter, Charlotte, who had a heart defect, with Cosima Hofer, the daughter of Ernst and Luise Hofer. Cosima arrives in Bichelheim and wants to take back what she feels was taken from her. Cosima's son Lukas Zastrow also comes to Bichelheim and is appointed managing director of the Fürstenhof.

Lukas meets his former classmate Annika Bruckner, who has transformed from an ugly duckling into a beautiful swan. Lukas is enchanted by Annika, but Annika does not trust him. It takes Lukas a lot of effort to convince Annika of the sincerity of his feelings, but eventually she gives in and starts a relationship with Lukas. One day, Lukas is arguing with Cosima in the car and accidentally hits Annika on her bike. Annika tragically dies of a cerebral hemorrhage and her organs are donated. Her heart is donated to Sandra Ostermeyer, who was dying of heart failure. Lukas is devastated by the loss of the love of his life. At the hospital, Lukas meets Sandra, who is immediately drawn to him.

Sandra begins her rehabilitation at the Fürstenhof at the invitation of Werner Saalfeld, an old acquaintance of her mother, Astrid. It is later revealed Sandra is Werner's daughter. In his grief, Lukas finds it too difficult to be around Sandra. The pair grow closer, but Lukas still just wants to be friends and instead starts dating Rosalie Engel. There is a war brewing between Cosima and the Saalfelds, which Sandra and Lukas both get caught up in. Cosima wants to keep Lukas away from Sandra and pushes him to marry Rosalie since she has shares in the Fürstenhof. Lukas goes through with marrying Rosalie. The marriage is short-lived since Lukas cannot deny his love for Sandra and leaves Rosalie to be with her. Not wanting a repeat of what happened with Felix, Rosalie accepts this and agrees to give Lukas a divorce. However, Cosima is determined to get Rosalie's shares and tries to have her killed. Rosalie survives and goes into a coma. Lukas is accused of Rosalie's attempted murder, but Cosima gives him an alibi. Cosima blackmails Sandra that she will retract Lukas's alibi if she does not end her relationship with him. Sandra finds out she is pregnant, which is risky because of her heart transplant. She sadly has a miscarriage. After countless lies, schemes and manipulations, Cosima's dies. Cosima asks for Lukas's forgiveness with her dying breath and Lukas forgives his mother. Sandra and Lukas get married in an emotional ceremony. They leave Bichelheim to move to the Giant Mountains in the Czech Republic to convert an old monastery into an eco-hotel.

Sandra and Lukas later adopt a little girl named Anna. Sandra returns for Werner's 75th birthday, along with her siblings.

=== Season 6: Eva Krendlinger and Robert Saalfeld ===
Robert Saalfeld comes to Bichelheim for a brief visit, while his pregnant wife Miriam stays behind in Paris. Robert gets a call that Miriam is in labor and rushes to be by her side. Tragedy strikes when Miriam dies after giving birth to their daughter, Valentina. Robert cannot believe he has lost his beloved wife. He has Miriam's funeral in Bichelheim and decides to move back into the Fürstenhof.

Without the love of his life, Robert loses all meaning in his life and rejects his daughter, who he blames for Miriam's death. Eva Krendlinger becomes Valentina's nanny and helps Robert bond with his daughter. Robert realises that he has to try to be the best father he can be to Valentina. Eva falls in love with Robert, but he is not ready for a relationship. Barbara von Heidenberg, Miriam's evil stepmother, wants Valentina's inheritance. Barbara proves Robert to be an unfit father, because of his initial rejection of Valentina and she is taken by social services. Barbara hires Alain Briand to pretend to be Miriam's former lover and to claim he is actually Valentina's father. Eva continues to work as Valentina's nanny to protect her from Alain. Valentina is thankfully reunited with Robert. Eva finally conquers Robert's heart, the two declare their love for each other while on a trip to Verona and make love for the first time. However, Robert realises he is not over Miriam and has doubts if he can really be with Eva. When Eva tells Robert she is pregnant, he is scared he will lose her the same way he lost Miriam and separates from her. Eva is shocked to see her first love, Markus Zastrow, who had been presumed dead years ago. Eva reunites with Markus. Robert realises he and Eva belong together and wants to be with her and their child. When Eva suffers miscarriage, she decides she is done with Robert for good. Eva gets engaged to Markus, but eventually her heart tells that she belongs with Robert. She ends her relationship with Markus to reunite with Robert. Eva happily accepts Robert's marriage proposal. Barbara rigs the Fürstenhof with a bomb on Eva and Robert's wedding day. The bomb denotes after the ceremony, but thankfully everyone survives. Eva, Robert and Valentina move to Verona, where Robert will run his own restaurant and Eva will achieve her dream of being a children's book author.

In 2017, Robert and Eva returned for Werner and Charlotte's wedding, where Robert walked his mother down the aisle. Robert, Eva and Valentina moved back into the Fürstenhof permanently in 2018. Eva had a one-night-stand with Christoph Saalfeld and later found out she was pregnant. The baby, Emilio, is initially believed to be Robert's, but he was later revealed to be Christoph's. This caused Eva and Robert to split up and Eva left town with the baby.

=== Season 7: Theresa Burger and Moritz van Norden ===
Architect Moritz van Norden is the son of scheming Doris van Norden. Moritz was raised believing Günther van Norden was his father, but his father is revealed to be Werner Saalfeld. Doris is planning a takeover of the struggling local brewery, Burger Bräu, that belongs to Theresa Burger. Moritz and Theresa meet and immediately fall in love. Just as their relationship is blossoming, Moritz's twin brother Konstantin Riedmüller, who had been given up for adoption, arrives in Germany from Argentina. Moritz and Konstantin meet on a bridge and Moritz accidentally fall into the water and is presumed dead. Konstantin then starts a relationship with Theresa and falls in love with her. Moritz is revealed to be alive and had only been in a coma. He returns to Bichelheim, but he has amnesia and is going by the name Peter Bach. He falls in love with Theresa all over again and Theresa cannot help but be drawn to him. Eventually, it is revealed what Konstantin did and he loses Theresa to Moritz. Moritz and Theresa have a beautiful wedding ceremony in a church in the mountains. Konstantin makes peace with his twin brother and Theresa. Moritz and Theresa leave Bichelheim for Port Westfalica.

Moritz returned to Bichelheim to celebrate Werner's 75th birthday, along with his siblings.

=== Season 8: Marlene Schweitzer and Konstantin Riedmüller ===
Konstantin Riedmüller is heartbroken over the loss of his great love Theresa to his twin brother, Moritz. Kind-hearted, demure pianist Marlene Schweitzer arrives at the Fürstenhof and falls in love with Konstantin at first sight. Natascha, Marlene's flamboyant mother, has also come to the Fürstenhof, and also takes an interest in Konstantin. Konstantin ends up starting a purely physical relationship with Natascha, which deeply hurts Marlene. Marlene develops a connection with Dr. Michael Niederbühl and they start dating. Meanwhile, Natascha and Konstantin's relationship becomes more serious. Marlene and Konstantin develop a close friendship, though Marlene's feelings for him still linger. Marlene accepts Michael's marriage proposal. When Natascha becomes pregnant, Konstantin also proposes and she accepts. However, Natascha changes her mind about the pregnancy, has an abortion and claims to have had miscarriage to Konstantin. Konstantin finally falls in love with Marlene. Natascha and Konstantin are about to get married at a registry office, but he leaves her at the altar. Konstantin confesses to Marlene that he is in love with her, but Marlene does not want to hurt Michael or her mother. Eventually, she gives in and they sleep together. Marlene ends her engagement to Michael, who is disgusted to learn she has left him for her own mother's ex. Distressed by her break-up with Konstantin, Natascha attempts suicide. This makes it even harder for Marlene to confess things to her mother, but Natascha eventually catches Marlene and Konstantin together. Out of revenge, Natascha pretends to be Theresa and writes letters to Konstantin saying Theresa is still in love with him. Marlene fears Konstantin loves Theresa and not her, but Kontsantin declares that Marlene is his true love. After getting engaged, Marlene and Konstantin decide to get married as quickly as possible. They marry in a gorgeous ceremony on the lake. They both make peace with Natascha before setting off for their new life in Florence. They later welcome a son, Miguel, named after Konstantin's late adoptive father.

Konstantin and Marlene return for Werner's 75th birthday and help Natascha and Michael through a marital crisis they are facing.

=== Season 9: Pauline Jentzsch and Leonard Stahl ===
Leonard Stahl comes to Fürstenhof with his father, Friedrich. Friedrich buys 90% of the hotel's stocks and Leonard becomes the CEO. Pauline Jentzsch comes to Fürstenhof with her best friend, Coco Conradi. The Fürstenhof belonged to Pauline's family before it was sold to Ludwig Saalfeld. Pauline gets a job at Fürstenhof as the hotel's pastry chef and meets Leonard, who she immediately falls in love with. However, Leonard is not interested in Pauline and starts dating the devious Patrizia Dietrich. Patrizia's grandfather Joseph Dietrich reveals to Patrizia that Pauline's grandfather Erich von Weyersbrunn was planning to sell the Fürstenhof to Ludwig Saalfeld, but he died of heart attack before the contract was signed. Joseph then helped Ludwig forge Erich's signature, bury his body and make everybody believe he had disappeared. Joseph decides to give Pauline some money as compensation, but Patrizia does not want to lose her inheritance and murders him before he can reveal the truth. Leonard realises Patrizia's scheming nature and ends their relationship. Out of revenge, Patrizia blackmails Friedrich that she will reveal the illegal sale of the Fürstenhof, which means ownership of the hotel would revert to Pauline and he would be financially ruined. To keep her quiet, Friedirich employs Patrizia as a PR manager.

Leonard and Pauline start a relationship and fall in love. Friedrich pushes Leonard to marry Pauline so he will not lose the Fürstenhof. Leonard is not ready for marriage, but listens to his father and proposes to Pauline, who accepts. However, Pauline finds out the truth about the Fürstenhof and Leonard's reason for marrying her, which makes her break up with him. Pauline gets 20% of Friedrich's shares.

Leonard's old university friend Daniel Brückner comes to Fürstenhof and sparks fly between him and Pauline. Patrizia becomes pregnant with twins after an affair with Friedrich, but claims that they are Leonard's. Pauline and Daniel fall in love, which is hard for Leonard to take. Famous musician Chris Brenner comes to the Fürstenhof. Daniel reveals he is bisexual and had an affair with Chris many years ago. Chris does not want the public to know he is gay for fear of losing his career and had even married a woman named Yvonne, who discovered the affair and took her own life. Daniel is haunted by his role in Yvonne's death, but Pauline is more upset that he did not tell her the truth. Chris schemes to get Daniel back and it culminates with Chris attempting to murder Daniel and Pauline, but thankfully they are saved by Leonard.

When Friedrich finds out that Patrizia's twins are his, he pushes Patrizia down the stairs. Patrizia gives birth to premature twin girls Mara and Mila, and then falls into a coma. Mara dies, leaving Leonard devastated. Pauline supports Leonard through the tragedy and caring for Mila. Leonard knows Pauline is the love of his life and decides to ask her to marry him. However, Daniel proposes first and Pauline accepts. Patrizia awakens from her coma and fakes having amnesia. Pauline has second thoughts about Daniel and ends their engagement. Pauline and Leonard have a romantic reunion in Vienna and Pauline happily accepts Leonard's marriage proposal.

The two jilted lovers, Patrizia and Daniel, create a plan to break up Leonard and Pauline. Daniel kidnaps Mila while Pauline is out with her and then hides out in San Cortez with Patrizia's half-sister, Barbara von Heidenberg. Leonard separates from Pauline and marries Patrizia so Daniel will not want to take revenge anymore. Leonard finds out about Patrizia's scheme and demands she give him Mila, but then Patrizia reveals Friedrich is actually Mila's father. Leonard quickly divorces Patrizia and reunites with Pauline. Pauline receives an offer to work as a pastry chef in Vienna and discovers she is pregnant. Leonard and Pauline finally marry and then leave for Vienna. They later welcome a son named Gabriel, who is named after Leonard's late mother, Gabrielle.

In 2015, Pauline and Leonard return for the wedding of Leonard's brother Niklas to Julia Wegener. Patrizia attempts to murder Niklas and Leonard, but Friedrich ends up killing her. Afterwards, Friedrich allows Pauline and Leonard to take Mila to Vienna with them. They return again for Friedrich's funeral in 2017. In 2020, they pay a visit to the Fürstenhof and Leonard sells his family's Fürstenhof shares to Christoph Saalfeld.

=== Season 10: Julia Wegener and Niklas Stahl ===
Julia Wegener, her brother Sebastian and his girlfriend Sophie Stahl, the estranged daughter of Friedrich Stahl, arrive in Bichlheim. Sophie and the Wegeners met in Thailand. Sophie has not seen her family in many years, because she ran away to Thailand and was later presumed dead in the tsunami. Upon learning that she came from a wealthy family, Sebastian began dating Sophie hoping that Friedrich will agree to pay for the treatments for his serious, rare illness. However, on their way to the Fürstenhof Sophie is run over and killed by Patrizia Dietrich. With her dying breath, Sophie tells Julia she needs to pretend to be her so Sebastian can get his treatment. Sebastian buries Sophie's body in the forest and pressures a nervous Julia into impersonating Sophie. The Stahls are fooled by the Wegeners' act and welcome "Sophie" back into the family. At the lake, Julia meets a dashing, mysterious stranger who she kisses and instantly falls in love with. At Leonard and Pauline's wedding, Julia meets the mystery man again and is stunned to find out that he is Sophie's brother, Niklas Stahl, who just arrived from Barcelona. Of course, Julia knows she is not actually his sister, but Niklas does not, so to keep up the charade, Julia has no other choice but distance herself from him. Niklas decides to stay in Bichelheim and work as a chef in the Fürstenhof.

Sebastian finds out that Patrizia ran over Sophie, but instead of feeling hatred for her, he begins an affair with her. Niklas becomes attracted to Patrizia and they start dating, while Patrizia continues her affair with Sebastian. Niklas and Julia are still drawn to each other, but Niklas feels disgusted by his attraction to his "sister." In the barn, Niklas and Julia kiss and are about to have sex when Patrizia photographs them and then slams the door which makes them snap out of their passion. Julia and Niklas instantly regret their misstep, and they distance themselves again. Sebastian becomes jealous of Niklas and Patrizia so he triggers a landslide, which almost kills them. Niklas suffers from blood poisoning which paralyses his arm and leaves him unable to cook. He considers going back to Barcelona, but Julia convinces him to stay. Julia becomes close with Nils Heinemann and helps him overcome his alcoholism, which he developed after the death of his wife, Sabrina. When things take a romantic turn, Julia confesses to Nils that she is not Sophie Stahl. Nils is understanding and the two fall in love. Niklas marries Patrizia despite his doubts about her. Julia becomes engaged to Nils. Niklas quickly realises he cannot trust Patrizia and wants a divorce.

Sebastian has been able to get his treatment thanks to Friedrich's money and seems to be improving so Julia feels she should finally come clean about her identity. Sebastian does not want to jeopardise his access to the Stahl money so in a panic he tells Patrizia everything and convinces her to help him kidnap Julia. Patrizia wants to kill Julia, but instead Sebastian decides to let her go. When Julia admits to Niklas and Friedrich that she is not Sophie, Sebastian claims she is mentally ill. Afraid she will be institutionalized, Julia wants Nils to marry her as soon as possible. A genetic test is done, but Patrizia changes it and it shows that Julia is Sophie. This causes Nils to leave Julia at the altar.

Patrizia plans to shot Charlotte Saalfeld and put the blame on to Friedrich, but Sebastian tries to stop her and ends up being the one who gets shot. Julia donates blood to her brother and since they are the same blood type, this finally makes people believe Julia's claims about her identity. A second genetic test confirms that Julia and Sebastian are in fact siblings, which means the truth about the Sophie's death and the Wegeners' scheme is finally out. Niklas is initially angry that Julia lied to him, but cannot deny his love for her and they finally become a couple. Friedrich on the other hand is outraged and firmly believes that Sebastian and Julia murdered Sophie in cold-blood. Sebastian confesses that buried Sophie's body, but that it was Patrizia who ran her over. Patrizia gets the upper hand when she poisons Niklas and he goes into a coma. Since they are still married, Patrizia threatens to take him off of life support unless Julia takes the blame for Sophie's death. Wanting to protect his sister, Sebastian takes the blame and is arrested. Patrizia removes Niklas's life support anyways, but he is able to breathe on his own. Patrizia tries to kill Niklas again, but fails and is arrested. Sebastian revokes his confession and is released.

Niklas and Julia become engaged. At their wedding, Patrizia, who has escaped from custody, sneaks in to kidnap her daughter, Mila, but is caught. Patrizia threatens to shot Leonard and Niklas, but is shot by Friedrich and dies. After everything they have been through, Niklas and Julia are desperate for a new start. They move to Lisbon where Niklas will work in a high-end restaurant.

=== Season 11: Luisa Reisiger and Sebastian Wegener ===
Luisa Reisiger comes to Bichlheim to support her mother Marta, who is dying. Luisa suffered spinal cord damage from a car accident and has a hump on her back, which makes her very self-conscious. One day, Sebastian sees Luisa on the dock and is instantly smitten with her, but does not see her hump. When Sebastian does see it, he decides it does not matter to him. Martha sadly dies and Sebastian comforts Luisa. At her funeral, Luisa meets her father, Hermann Stürzebecher, who had abandoned her and her mother. Hermann confesses he is not actually Luisa's father and it was Marta who cut off contact, but he still loves Luisa as his own. Hermann unexpectedly dies of a heart attack and Luisa becomes his sole heir. However, his fiancée Beatrice Hofer also wants the inheritance. Beatrice demands her son David seduces Luisa so she will marry him and they can get their hands on her inheritance. Sebastian and Luisa get together, but are broken up by David and Beatrice. Luisa finds out that Friedrich Stahl is actually her father and wants to form a relationship with him.

Luisa gets close to David, but then his ex-girlfriend Alina Steffen shows up at the Fürstenhof. David starts a relationship with her again and Luisa gets close to Sebastian again. Beatrice wants Sebastian and Alina out of the way so David can focus on Luisa. Beatrice tries to kill Sebastian, but is unsuccessful. Alina finds out that she is pregnant, which David is thrilled about. Alina and Beatrice have an argument and Alina falls and hits her head on a stone and tragically dies. Friedrich witnessed the altercation and is ultimately arrested for Alina's murder. Beatrice helps Friedrich avoid prosecution and tries blackmailing him, but then they end up starting an affair. Luisa falls out with Sebastian again and starts a relationship with David. Luisa learns her spine is curving dangerously and she is risking becoming paralyzed. Dr. Michael Niederbühl advises her to have back surgery, but Luisa is reluctant to have the surgery. When Luisa finally decides to have the surgery, Beatrice urges David to marry Luisa before her surgery because he would receive her inheritance in the event of her death. David and Luisa marry in an intimate ceremony. Luisa's surgery is successful and she no longer has a hump on her back. Sebastian decides he cannot watch the love of his life with another man so he leaves Bichelheim. David feels guilty over accidentally shooting and killing his father when he was a child (it is later revealed that it was Beatrice who shot him). Luisa offers David her support and David genuinely falls in love with her. Beatrice is infuriated when David states he will no longer take part in her plan and decides to destroy their marriage. Beatrice lures Sebastian back to the village. When Sebastian nearly dies from a virus, Luisa realises her love for him and separates from David to reunite with him. Beatrice tries to kill David by hitting him on the back of the head, causing him to fall into a coma. David wakes up with amnesia and believes he and Luisa are still married. Luisa pretends they are still together to help David recover, but then David catches her with Sebastian.

Sebastian and Luisa feel they are finally going to have their happy ending. Sebastian admits to Luisa he was married before to a woman named Isabelle Raspe, who he had married because she came from a wealthy family and could help pay for his medical treatment. Isabelle shows up at the Fürstenhof and gives Sebastian two shocks: first that they are still legally married and second they have a son named Paul, who suffers from the same illness as Sebastian. Sebastian is devastated he has given his son the same disease. Isabelle is estranged from her family, so she agrees to work with Beatrice to break up Luisa and Sebastian and in exchange Beatrice will pay for Paul's care. Sebastian wants to be there for his son and Luisa supports him, but the pressure strains on their relationship. Sebastian steals €100,000 from Friedrich for his son's therapy. Beatrice finds out about the theft and blackmails Sebastian: he breaks up with Luisa or she goes to the police. Sebastian confesses everything to Luisa and they pretend to break up so Beatrice will drop the blackmail. Sebastian ends up having a one-night-stand with Isabelle, which Luisa forgives him for. Isabelle wants to reunite with Sebastian, but he makes it clear that is not going to happen. David regains his memory and kidnaps Beatrice out of revenge. Luisa and Friedrich manage to rescue Beatrice and Beatrice admits to Luisa her scheme to get her inheritance. Shortly afterwards, Isabelle departs to Düsseldorf with Paul, whose condition has improved. Sebastian proposes to Luisa and she happily accepts. They are thrilled when Paul arrives for the wedding and they marry with him by their side. Luisa and Sebastian decide to move to Düsseldorf to be near Paul and say goodbye to their friends and family in Bichelheim.

=== Season 12: Clara Morgenstern and Adrian Lechner ===
Clara Morgenstern, an aspiring knitwear designer, comes to the Fürstenhof to locate her grandfather, specifically the biological father of her mother Melli, who was adopted. It turns out that hotel concierge Alfons Sonnbichler is Melli's biological father. Clara and Melli both settle into Bichelheim. One day, she runs into her childhood friend, Adrian Lechner and immediately falls in love with him. When Adrian learns that the Fürstenhof is in financial difficulties, he buys 20% of the shares. Clara and Adrian spend more time together, but Adrian only sees Clara as a little sister. Desirée Bramigk, Clara's roommate, also shows interest in Adrian. Adrian starts casually dating Desirée. In order to bind Adrian to her, Desirée's mother Beatrice, who wants Adrian's Fürstenhof shares, advises her to become pregnant. Desirée refuses so Beatrice tampers with her birth control pills. When Desirée discovers she is pregnant, Adrian is thrilled to become a father and they become engaged. Clara is heartbroken and decides to finally confess her feelings to Adrian, but Adrian tells her he does not feel the same way. Desirèe sadly loses the child, but decides not to tell Adrian, who she knows is only marrying her because of her pregnancy. Clara suspects that Desirèe is no longer pregnant, but has no proof. A devastated Clara watches her beloved Adrian marry Desirèe. Desirée notices Clara's closeness with Adrian and warns her to stay away from her husband. Desirée needs to fake a miscarriage and decides to make Clara look responsible to get her out Adrian's life. As Clara is driving a Fürstenhof shuttle, Desirée purposely falls under the car and fakes her miscarriage. Beatrice bribes a witness to claim Clara deliberately hit Desirée. This causes Adrian to cut Clara out of his life.

When Adrian was a child, his mother Joanne and little brother William were believed to have died. However, he learns that they might actually be alive and he wants to find them. Clara had also been good friends with William and wants to help Adrian. Adrian is overcome with emotion when he speaks to his little brother for the first time in almost two decades. Soon afterwards, William travels from Australia to Bichelheim and they have an emotional reunion. Adrian and William's mother, who now goes by the name Susan Newcombe, confesses that their father Hagen was a contract killer and she fled to her native Australia to protect William. Susan also confesses that Hagen was not William's father, his biological father is actually Werner Saalfeld. Clara and Adrian manage to become friends again. William becomes a fitness trainer and the Fürstenhof. Clara and William become close and he falls in love with her. Clara wants to move on from Adrian and she and William start dating. When William proposes to Clara, she turns him down since she is not ready to take such a big step. Adrian finally falls in love with Clara and wants to be with her. However, Clara changes her mind and accepts William's marriage proposal before Adrian can confess his feelings. When Adrian admits to William he is in love with his fiancée, tension mounts between the two brothers. Desirée is scared she is losing Adrian so Beatrice pretends to be a stalker so Adrian will feel obligated to protect Desirée.

Clara finds out that Adrian is in love with her. With her wedding to William approaching, Clara becomes overwhelmed with her feelings for the two brothers. When a snowstorm hits, Clara and Adrian become trapped in one of the hotel's cabins. Clara and Adrian finally confess their love for each other and they make love. Afterwards, Clara decides she is still going to marry William. Meanwhile, Adrian tells Desirée their marriage is over. When William suggests that they go to Las Vegas to get married, Clara finally confesses that she is in love with Adrian and ends their engagement. Clara feels guilty about hurting William and keeps her distance from Adrian. However, Adrian fights to be with the woman he loves and Clara finally gives in. They become a couple, which annihilates William and Adrian's relationship. Adrian finds out about Desirée's schemes and quickly annuls their marriage. Adrian proposes and an overjoyed Clara accepts. Clara is offered a job in Tokyo and it is originally decided she will live there while Adrian stays in Germany. However, Adrian decides he will go with Clara and open a Bavarian restaurant in Tokyo. Surrounded by family and friends, Adrian and Clara become husband and wife. William reconciles with both of them and they promise they will always be the "three musketeers." After a touching farewell party, Adrian and Clara set off for their new life in Japan.

Clara returns for Melli's wedding to André Konopka. Melli later joins Adrian and Clara in Tokyo after her marriage to André breaks down. In 2022, Alfons receives word that Clara and Adrian have welcomed a son named Junichiro. In 2025, Clara returns to Bichelheim for Alfons and Hildegard's vow renewal.

=== Season 13: Rebecca Herz, Ella Kessler and William Newcombe ===
Ella Kessler and Rebecca Herz have been best friends since childhood. When they were young, Ella's boyfriend Marcel and Rebecca had an affair. After Marcel died in a motorcycle accident, the shared grief made the two girls come together again and they swore to each other that no man would ever come between them again. Years later, Ella and Rebecca start working as chambermaids at the Fürstenhof in order to finance their big dream: their own wedding agency “Herzkomplizen”. There they meet the young, handsome fitness trainer William Newcombe, who is still heartbroken over losing his great love Clara Morgenstern to his brother Adrian. Ella immediately falls in love with William, while Rebecca is unimpressed by him. By chance, William and Rebecca come into possession of each other's mobile numbers without knowing who the numbers belong to. They start an anonymous text chat as Mr. and Mrs. Wrong, where they have intimate conversations and develop feelings for each other. Rebecca is shocked to realise that William is Mr. Wrong and breaks off contact so as not to endanger her friendship with Ella. Rebecca lets William believe Ella is Mrs. Wrong, paving the way for her friend to have a relationship with William.

After sharing a kiss with William, Rebecca finally realises that she, too, has fallen in love with William. However, she keeps her feelings to herself. Meanwhile, Ella is on cloud nine with William and loses her virginity to him. Ella confesses to William that Rebecca is actually Mrs. Wrong, which makes William see Rebecca differently. Ella grows insecure in her relationship with William and she demands that he marries her to prove his love for her, but William refuses and the relationship breaks down. William falls in love with Rebecca, but when Ella finds out about their feelings for each other, she gives Rebecca a choice: their friendship or William. Rebecca chooses Ella, but still cannot deny what she feels for William. Eventually, Ella and Rebecca's friendship breaks down and Ella leaves Bichelheim. Rebecca and William officially become a couple. Ella returns and asks Rebecca to plan her wedding to millionaire Patrick von Brahmberg. Ella enjoys rubbing her happiness with Patrick in Rebecca and William's faces, but Ella is only with Patrick for his money. William receives an offer to train with the Australian national taekwondo team for the 2020 Olympics, but this will mean moving back to Sydney. Rebecca wants William to achieve his dreams and agrees to go with him. Ella realises it is wrong to marry Patrick and leaves him at the altar. Ella reconciles with Rebecca and William and William spontaneously proposes to Rebecca. They get married that same day, so Mr. and Mrs. Wrong are now Mr.and Mrs. Right. They later depart for Australia.

William returns for Werner's 75th birthday, along with his siblings.

=== Season 14: Alicia Lindbergh and Viktor Saalfeld ===
Charlotte Saalfeld reconnects with her long-estranged brother Gottfried, who had been disowned by their father, Ludwig. Charlotte also meets Gottfried's son Christoph, a successful hotelier. Christoph is angry at his father for hiding the truth about their family for his whole life. Determined to own his family's legacy, Christoph buys a large amount of shares in the Fürstenhof and tells his son Boris that some day the hotel will be all his.

Christoph's much-younger girlfriend, Dr. Alicia Lindbergh, pays a surprise visit and is upset when she catches Christoph with Desirée Bramigk. Christoph explains to Alicia that he believed they were broken up because she had said she did not want a long-distance relationship. Christoph and Alicia reconcile and he ensures that Alicia gets a job at the local hospital. Alicia is head over heels in love with Christoph and overlooks a lot of his morally ambiguous actions. Alicia hopes to marry and have a family with Christoph, but he is reluctant to become a father again at his age. Alicia proposes to Christoph and he accepts.

Christoph's estranged eldest son, Viktor, arrives in Bichelheim. Viktor nas not seen or spoken to his family in ten years and has a criminal past, which he wants to leave behind. Viktor falls in love with Alicia at first sight without knowing who she is and is stunned when he learns she is engaged to his father. Viktor is happy to reunited with Boris, but he immediately clashes with Christoph. Viktor hopes Alicia can see what kind of man Christoph truly is, but Alicia ignores Viktor's warnings and remains fully dedicated to Christoph. Viktor and Christoph manage to cool the tensions between them and Viktor begins working at the Fürstenhof stables. Viktor and Alicia bond over their love of horses and Viktor feels he and Alicia are meant for each other. On her wedding day to Christoph, Viktor begs Alicia not to marry him, but she goes through with the ceremony and is excited about starting her life with Christoph. Viktor and Alicia grow closer, which is noticed by Christoph. Christoph encourages Jessica Bronkhorst to pursue Viktor and they begin a casual relationship.

Christoph's ex-wife and the mother of his children, Xenia, arrives in Bichelheim after twenty years of estrangement. Alicia is disgusted to find out that Christoph blackmailed Xenia into leaving their children behind after he had found out she had an affair. Alicia ends their marriage and grows close to Viktor. Viktor and Alicia are about to become a couple when Alicia discovers she is pregnant by Christoph. Viktor offers to pretend to be the father, but Alicia does not want to keep Christoph's child away from him. Alicia wants to give her child a proper family and reconciles with Christoph. Xenia poisons Alicia and she sadly has a miscarriage.

Alicia decides her marriage to Christoph is over and she declares her love for Viktor. Christoph sees them in bed together and is determined to not let his beloved Alicia get away from him. Alicia tries to end their marriage, but Christoph threatens to harm Viktor, Alicia's brother Paul and her grandmother Anna if she does not stay with him. Alicia complies with Christoph's threats and lies to Viktor that she wants to stay with Christoph, but Viktor knows something is amiss. Jessica tells Viktor she is pregnant and he is the father (the father is later revealed to be Paul). Alicia tells Viktor about Christoph's threats and they start seeing each other in secret. When Boris comes out as gay, Christoph rejects him. When Alicia questions Christoph why he cannot accept Boris's sexuality, he confides in her that he was molested by his football coach when he was a child. Alicia is genuinely moved by Christoph's confession and wants to be there for him, but still declares their marriage is over.

Alicia fakes being ill so she will not have to leave the country with Christoph, who she knows is trying to kidnap her. Alicia is believed to be dead after a car accident, but it is revealed she faked her death so she could get away from Christoph. Viktor and Alicia plan to run away together, but Christoph finds out about the plan. Christoph holds Alicia and Viktor at gunpoint. Viktor and Christoph have a fight in the lake and Christoph becomes unconscious. Despite everything, Viktor and Alicia still save his life. Afterwards, Christoph finally accepts their marriage is over and agrees to give Alicia a divorce, which means Viktor and Alicia can finally be together. Viktor proposes to Alicia and she accepts. The pair marry in a small ceremony and then leave for Wachau. After they leave, Christoph tells his daughter Annabelle that Alicia is and will always be the love of his life.

A few months later, Viktor and Alicia return for Boris's wedding to Tobias Ehrlinger and things are still tense between them and Christoph. Alicia tells Viktor she is pregnant. Christoph realises he has to make peace with them if he wants to be in his grandchild's life and offers them genuine congratulations. They later welcome a daughter named Mia and Christoph is happy to become a grandfather. When Viktor comes for Denise's wedding to Joshua Winter, he and Christoph are happy to see each other, indicating father and son are truly at peace with each other.

=== Season 15: Denise Saalfeld and Joshua Winter ===
Shy, sensitive artist Denise Saalfeld is the youngest of Christoph and Xenia's four children. Denise has always been close with her father and is his favorite child. She has been living in the United States with her wild, glamorous, twice-divorced sister Annabelle. The sisters decide to stay in Bichelheim and help Christoph run the Fürstenhof. Denise finds an antique mirror which claims to help a person see their true love. In the reflection she sees Joshua Winter, the son of Robert Saalfeld, who is her father's cousin (though Joshua and Denise are not related by blood). Denise instantly falls in love with the handsome young man, but is too shy to confess her feelings. While cleaning out an old house, Joshua and Denise come across an old painting, which depicts a couple that looks exactly like them, which makes Denise feel like Joshua is her destiny. However, Annabelle, who has always been jealous of Denise's closeness with their father, decides to take Joshua for herself. Annabelle manages to seduce Joshua, breaking Denise's heart.

Denise's mother, Xenia, kills Joshua's adoptive father, Henning Winter. When Joshua finds out, he confronts her and she ends up kidnapping him and Denise. Xenia shoots Denise by accident and in her delirium Denise confesses her love for Joshua. Xenia attempts to flee, but is shot amd killed by Annabelle. Before Annabelle shoots her, Xenia confesses to Annabelle that Christoph is not her biological father. Denise meets charming veterinarian Henry Achtleitner and there is an immediate spark between them. Xenia had left Christoph a message revealing he is not the biological father of one of their four children and, sure enough, paternity tests show that Viktor, Boris and Denise are Christoph's biological children, but Annabelle is not. Before Christoph reads it, Annabelle switches the paternity test to show Denise is not Christoph's daughter instead of her. Denise is devastated when she finds out the "truth," but Christoph assures her it changes nothing. Henry and Denise fall in love, while Joshua realises his love for Denise. Joshua breaks up with Annabelle who is devastated since she had actually fallen in love with him. Henry proposes to Denise who at first turns him down, but then eventually accepts. Joshua confesses his love for Denise, but she wants to stay with Henry.

As their wedding day approaches, Denise starts to have doubts and realises it is because she loves Joshua. Henry is devastated when Denise ends their engagement and he attacks Joshua. Joshua and Denise are finally together, but Annabelle swears revenge on her sister for "stealing" Joshua from her. Annabelle attempts to poison Denise, but Romy Ehrlinger accidently drinks the poison and tragically dies on her wedding day to Paul Lindbergh. Christoph is in a coma after being run over by Valentina Saalfeld and needs a risky brain surgery, which Annabelle opposed since the truth about her paternity will be revealed. The surgery goes ahead and Christoph wakes up from his coma.

Eventually, the truth about everything Annabelle has done comes out (the paternity switch, poisoning Romy, among other misdeeds) and she flees. Joshua proposes to Denise on the dock at the lake and she accepts. Annabelle returns, kidnaps Denise and tries to drown her in the lake. Thankfully, Denise is rescued by Joshua and Annabelle is arrested. Denise and Joshua marry in a big ceremony with their loved ones at the Fürstenhof. After a touching goodbye with everyone, Denise and Joshua leave for Paris, where Denise will assist in restoring Notre Dame.

=== Season 16: Franzi Krummbeigl and Tim Saalfeld ===
Down-to-earth country girl Franziska "Franzi" Krummbeigl grew up with her aunt Margit's after the death of her parents. Franzi enjoys helping Margit on her apple orchard and loves their quiet country life. Franzi falls in love at first sight with a handsome stranger she briefly encounters, but forgets to ask his name. Franzi meets Boris Saalfeld and thinks he is her dream man, but Boris has never met Franzi. Word starts to spread around the Fürstenhof about Boris's doppelgänger. It turns out Boris's father Christoph and Christoph's sister Linda have been hiding a decades-long secret: Boris has an identical twin brother! While they were living in Thailand, their mother Xenia had been unaware she was pregnant with twins, gave birth while unconscious and one of the babies was kidnapped. Christoph later received a ransom demand, but, believing it was a hoax, refused to pay the money. Christoph finds out his long-lost son's name is Tim Degen and he was sold on the black market to another German couple. Tim is in the army and stationed near Bichelheim. Tim shows up at the Fürstenhof on the day of Denise and Joshua's wedding and is stunned to come face-to-face with Boris. Christoph confesses everything to Tim and the rest of his family, but leaves out the part about not paying the ransom. Once the shock wears off, Tim is happy to meet his biological family and wants to get to know them. Tim also meets Franzi again and their chemistry is palpable.

Tim agrees to work at the Fürstenhof, while trying to fulfill his dream of becoming a polo player. He and Franzi start spending time together. Franzi finds out about Christoph not wanting to pay the ransom for Tim, but keeps quiet. When he finds out the truth, Tim is furious. Tim eventually forgives Franzi and Christoph and even agrees to change his surname to Saalfeld. Franzi and Tim confess their love for each other. Nadja Holler, Tim's ex-girlfriend and the fiancée of his late best friend Ralf, comes to Bichelheim and wants to reconcile with him. Nadja claims she still loves Tim, but in reality she is just interested in the Saalfeld money. Nadja has a one-night-stand with Tim and then lies about being pregnant. Although he loves Franzi, Tim had promised Ralf he would always take care of Nadja and he proposes to her. Nadja sleeps with Linda's husband, Dirk Baumgartner, and actually becomes pregnant, but passes off the child as Tim's. Franzi tries to stop their wedding, but Nadja and Tim have already married. Franzi and Tim help Eva Saalfeld give birth during a snowstorm and the joy of the event results in the exes sharing a kiss, but Tim remains dedicated to Nadja and their child.

It comes out that Dirk was responsible for Tim's kidnapping and Tim openly swears revenge on him. Nadja murders Dirk when he threatens to expose her lies. When Dirk's body is found, Tim becomes the prime suspect. Boris returns to Bichelheim and the twins come up with a plan: Boris will pretend to be Tim and flee to Thailand, while Tim will pretend to be Boris and stay in Bichelheim to clear his name. Franzi becomes close to "Boris," but finds his behaviour strange. Tim confesses everything to Franzi and she agrees to help him. When Nadja sees Franzi kissing "Boris," she figures out he is actually Tim since Boris is gay. Nadja wants to make sure Tim goes down for the murder, but then she is exposed as the murderer. When Nadja tries to flee, Franzi chases her, they have a fight and Nadja hits her head on a rock. With her dying breath, Nadja swears to Tim on Ralf's grave that Franzi pushed her and dies in his arms. Tim has trouble believing Franzi's innocence and this tears them apart yet again. Tim eventually finds out Franzi is innocent and declares his love for her. However, Franzi has already started a relationship with Tim's cousin, Steffen. Tim in turn starts dating Amelie Limbach. However, there is still a magnetic pull between Franzi and Tim. After numerous trials and tribulations, Franzi and Tim finally reconcile and become engaged. Shortly before their wedding, Franzi and Tim are overjoyed to learn they are expecting a child. The pair have a beautiful wedding at the Fürstenhof. Afterwards, they leave for London where Tim can become a professional polo player. A few months later, they welcome their daughter, Natalie.

=== Season 17: Maja von Thalheim and Florian Vogt ===
Selina von Thalheim's adoptive daughter, Maja von Thalheim, shows up at the Fürstenhof in her wedding dress and tells her mother that her fiancé Frederik cheated with her best friend, Shirin Ceylan, and she has called off the wedding. Maja decides to stay with her mother and gets a job at the Fürstenhof. Maja and her family have had a rough few years. The von Thalheims were once a very wealthy family, but have since lost most of their fortune. Maja's father, Cornelius, supposedly died four years earlier after being caught up in a financial scandal. Maja is the only one who knows Cornelius faked his death and is hiding out in South America. Maja desperately misses her father and hopes he can one day be free. Maja meets Florian Vogt while walking in the forest. They immediately dislike each other, however they eventually become friends. Florian has come to Bichelheim to work as a forester at the Fürstenhof. His older brother Erik, who he is very close with, also joins him in the village. Florian and Erik are shocked to learn that their father Lothar was an illegitimate child of Ludwig Saalfeld, founder of the Fürstenhof, and they are entitled to land rights to the forest next to the hotel. Florian helps Maja care for her sick rabbit Napoleon and she falls in love with him. Florian soon realises he feels the same way and they start a relationship. Cornelius, under the name Lars Sternberg, comes to Bichelheim. It soon comes out that Erik actually framed Cornelius for financial crimes that Erik himself committed. The strain of the war between Cornelius and Erik takes its toll on Florian and Maja and they break up.

Maja's first love, Hannes Fröhlich, arrives in Bichelheim and Maja is not happy to see him since he dumped her with no explanation. Hannes explains that Maja's grandfather, Quirin, had threatened to have Hannes's father, the von Thalheim family chauffeur, fired if he did not stop dating his granddaughter. Maja falls in love with Hannes again, though her feelings for Florian still linger. Shirin, who has since reconciled with Maja, falls in love with Florian, but he does not return her feelings. Hannes and Maja get stuck in a cave and Florian rescues them. Realising life is short, Hannes proposes to Maja, who does not accept, but says she still wants to be with him. Florian realises he still loves Maja and wants another chance with her, but she turns him down.

Florian becomes ill with a deadly infection, which he contracted in the cave. There is no treatment, because the doctor who was researching it has since stopped. All of Florian's loved ones are determined to get Florian treatment. After some time, Maja realises she loves Florian and wants to be with him again, but Florian does not believe she should be with a dying man and tells her to stay with Hannes. Maja still ends up breaking up with Hannes, who is determined to get her back. Florian has a one-night-stand with a woman he meets while out drinking, who turns out to be Maja's sister, Constanze. Florian does eventually get treatment thanks to Hannes. Florian wants to get back together with Maja, but out of gratitude to Hannes, he agrees to stay away from Maja for a short period of time so Hannes can win her back. After receiving a job offer in California, Florian decides he cannot keep his promise to Hannes and he is going to ask Maja to come with him to California. A desperate Hannes lies that he and Maja slept together. Florian believes it is over between them and decides to leave without saying goodbye to Maja. Hannes confesses his lie to Maja and she runs to stop Florian from leaving. They share a romantic reunion. Hannes makes peace with Florian and Maja before leaving for New Zealand. Florian asks Maja to marry him and she accepts. They get married in a beautiful ceremony in front of family and friends and then leave for California.

In 2022, they briefly returned for the wedding of Erik's daughter Josie Klee and Paul Lindbergh. Florian came for a brief visit in 2023. In early 2024, Erik goes to see Florian and Maja in California after they welcome their daughter, Lea.

=== Season 18: Josie Klee and Paul Lindbergh ===
Scatter-brained but lovable Josefina ″Josie″ Klee comes to Bichelheim to apply for a job as a chef at the Fürstenhof. Josie grew up in Hanau with her maternal grandmother. Her mother was gone a lot and she never met her father. Josie hopes to work alongside André Knopka, who she greatly admires. However, Josie is a vegetarian chef and André is reluctant to take her on, but she wins him over. Paul Lindbergh has been down on his luck: his business failed, his girlfriend left him and his daughter, Luna, has moved to Lisbon with her mother Jessica and stepfather Henry. Needing to move on from his misfortune, Paul decides to return to Bichelheim to work as managing director at the Fürstenhof. On his way to the hotel, Paul sees Josie, who is looking for her glasses on the ground. He finds the glasses and when Josie puts them on, she instantly falls in love with Paul. From then on, Josie is flustered every time she is around Paul, causing some awkward situations. Paul is oblivious to Josie's feelings for him and starts a casual relationship with Constanze von Thalheim.

Josie's mother, Yvonne, comes to Bichelheim and informs Josie that Erik Vogt, who she has not gotten along with, is her biological father. Josie and Erik decide to get to know each other and try to form a relationship. Paul is shocked when he finds out Josie is in love with him when she mutters it in her sleep. There is a worker's strike at the Fürstenhof and when Paul sees Josie giving a passionate speech, he suddenly sees her differently and falls in love with her. However, by then he and Constanze have become more serious with each other so Paul decides to keep his feelings quiet.

Josie wants to move on from Paul, since she believes he will never feel the same way. When Paul declares his love for her, Josie is over the moon. Paul plans to break up with Constanze, but she has a car accident and he feels he cannot leave her. Paul and Josie start seeing each other in secret. With Josie, Paul feels for the first time since the death of his wife, Romy, he can finally move on. Constanze finds out about their affair and swears revenge. Paul eventually breaks up with Constanze to be with Josie. Their happiness is short-lived because Josie finds Paul in bed with a woman named Tatjana (this was all staged by Constanze who hired Tatjana to drug Paul). Josie ends things with Paul despite his protests of innocence. Paul begins seeing Constanze again and Josie starts dating Leon Thorman. Paul agrees to move to London with Constanze. Josie is devastated when she finds out a man named Ricky Müller is actually her biological father and not Erik. Paul comforts her and they almost kiss, making Paul realise he still loves her and cannot leave with Constanze. Constanze is heartbroken and confesses to the scheme with Tatjana. Paul is furious, but still makes peace with Constanze before she leaves town. Paul wants to tell Josie the truth, but Erik advises him to let Josie move on with her life. When Josie learns the truth about what happened with Tatjana from Leon, she declares she is happy with Leon and it changes nothing for her, but Paul still holds out hope that Josie will come back to him.

Leon proposes to Josie, but in that moment Josie realises she loves Paul and wants to be with him. Paul and Josie share a romantic reunion. Paul proposes to Josie and she accepts. Josie gets a job in Lisbon, which Paul is thrilled about since he can be close to his daughter. After a series of mishaps, they get married in a small ceremony with family and friends. Paul takes Josie's surname and Erik also officially adopts Josie. Leon also decides to leave town and parts on good terms with Josie. After heartfelt goodbyes with everyone, Josie and Paul depart Bichelheim for their new beginning in Portugal.

Josie returns for Shirin's wedding to Gerry Richter a few months later. In 2024, she returns again for Erik and Yvonne's wedding. Josie shares how happy she and Paul are in Lisbon and that she has become good friends with Jessica.

=== Season 19: Eleni Schwarzbach and Leander Saalfeld ===
Eleni Schwarzbach comes to Bichelheim to see her parents, Markus and Alexandra, the new majority shareholders of the Fürstenhof. Dr. Peter ″Leander″ Saalfeld, son of Laura and Alexander, comes to Bichlheim to take up a position as a doctor at the local hospital. During an argument between Markus and Christoph Saalfeld, Eleni falls down the stairs and goes into a coma. Alexandra confesses to Christoph that he is actually Eleni's father. Leander walks into Eleni's hospital room and immediately falls in love with her. Eleni wakes up from her coma and also feels drawn to Leander. The pair fall head-over-heels in love. Vroni, Eleni's younger sister, comes for a visit and is involved in a motorcycle accident. Leander performs an emergency operation on Vroni, but unfortunately Vroni does not survive. Alexandra and Markus Schwarzbach file a civil lawsuit against Leander, because they believe he botched the operation. The strain of these events tear Eleni and Leander apart. Eleni meets Julian Specht, a chauffeur at the Fürstenhof, and they start dating. Eventually, Alexandra and Markus drop the lawsuit, but Alexandra refuses to forgive him. Leander declares his love for Eleni, but she makes it clear she is happy with Julian.

Eleni has grown closer to Christoph since learning of her paternity, but tells Markus he will always be her father. Markus has to have an operation because of abnormalities in his brain. Leander successfully performs the operation on Markus. Alexandra apologizes to Leander for everything and they agree to move on. Eleni and Leander realise they still love each other and want to get back together. Eleni plans to break up with Julian, but then discovers that she is pregnant by him. Leander tells Eleni he will love the child as his own, but Eleni does not want her child torn between two fathers like she is and decides to stay with Julian. Julian proposes to Eleni and she accepts. Unfortunately, Eleni has a miscarriage. Without Eleni, Leander decides there is nothing left for him in Bichelheim and accepts a job in Tanzania, hoping to overcome his heartbreak. Upon learning that Leander is leaving, Eleni realises they belong together and rushes to stop him. The pair happily reunite and Eleni ends her engagement to Julian. Eleni accepts Leander's marriage proposal and they agree to move to Tanzania together. They marry in front of family and friends. Afterwards, they say goodbye to Bichelheim.

A little while later, Eleni calls her mother and informs her she is pregnant. She and Leander later welcome a daughter named Nala. In 2025, Leander returns to Bichelheim with his father for Alfons and Hildegard's vow renewal. He is stunned when Alexander tells him that he has an older half-brother, Massimo Foghetti.

=== Season 20: Ana Alves, Philipp Brandes and Vincent Ritter ===
For this season, the focus is the love triangle between Ana Alves and her two dream men: her childhood friend, the scheming, charming, and always well-dressed Philipp Brandes and friendly, dependable veterinarian Dr. Vincent Ritter. Ana, Philipp and Vincent all have connections to the Schwarzbach family - Ana's mother, Nicole, worked as the family's housekeeper, Philipp is Noah's best friend and Vincent is Markus's illegitimate son. Vincent and Philipp couldn't be more different, but they do have two big things in common. First, they both had difficult childhoods with absent fathers. Second is Ana, who will become the love of both of their lives. Ana has two candidates for her heart, but who will she choose?

Ana arrives in Bichlheim to spend her semester break with her mother, Nicole, at the Sonnbichlers' house. Ana decides to stop studying mechanical engineering at university and settle in Bichlheim, bringing along her beloved stallion, Apollo. Philipp, comes to Bichelheim to use the Fürstenhof as permanent accommodation for his sick, wealthy great-aunt Wilma von Zweigen, whose estate he is determined to inherit. Ana has always been in love with Philipp and upon seeing him, falls in love with him all over again, but Philipp only sees Ana as a friend. Philipp and Ana both get jobs at the Fürstenhof. Ana meets Vincent, who has come to the village to work at the local veterinary practice and the Fürstenhof also hires him to work at the stud farm. Vincent immediately falls in love with Ana, but she takes no notice. Vincent gives Markus the shock of his life when tells him he is his son, the product of one-night-stand between him and his secretary, Jackie Ritter.

Ana is head-over-heels in love with Philipp, while Vincent secretly longs for Ana and doesn't understand what she sees in Philipp, who he considers to be mean and snobby. Philipp and Vincent unexpectedly become flatmates. After Ana impulsively kisses him, Philipp breaks her heart when he tells her he only sees her as a little sister. Philipp tries with all his might to convince Wilma to leave him her estate, but she refuses to include him in her will. Wilma becomes close to Ana and encourages Vincent to pursue her, but Ana insists Vincent is just a friend. Vincent wears Philipp's discarded costume to a masquerade ball, where Ana mistakes him for Philipp and they have a magical dance. Later, Ana is shocked to learn the identity of her mystery dance partner and now has to realise her undeniable connection to Vincent. Philipp begins a relationship with Ana to please Wilma, while at the same time having an affair with hotel guest Zoe de Lavalle. Ana doubts Philipp's feelings for her and breaks up with him. Vincent sees Zoe and Philipp kissing and tells Ana, who confronts Philipp about whether he cheated on her. To get back at Vincent for his meddling, Philipp anonymously reports him for treating some farm animals with expired medication and Vincent's veterinary licence is suspended. Vincent still risks his entire career by operating on Apollo's back and is later cleared of any wrongdoing. Ana is overwhelmed by everything Vincent has done for her and confesses to him that she has fallen in love with him. Ana and Vincent officially become a couple.

Wilma sadly dies, leaving Ana devastated. Philipp is furious when he learns that Wilma not only left him nothing, but also left most of her estate to Ana. Philipp decides in order to get the inheritance he has to marry Ana, make her look mentally unwell and then take control of her estate. Ana and Vincent enjoy their love while Philipp plots to destroy their relationship. Philipp brings Vincent's secret wife, Natalie Junghans, to the village to help him with his plan (Natalie is Vincent's childhood friend who he spontaneously married in Las Vegas years before). Philipp cleverly manipulates Vincent into believing that Ana is cheating with him, which makes Vincent break up with her.

A turning point for Philipp comes when Ana saves his life and upon opening his eyes he falls in love with her and no longer wants her inheritance. Meanwhile, Vincent also realises Ana is the love of his life and emotionally asks her to give him another chance, but she decides to reunite with Philipp. To get over his heartbreak, Vincent starts sleeping with Natalie. Ana learns about her inheritance from Wilma and cannot believe she is now a wealthy woman. Vincent immediately suspects that Philipp knew about the inheritance all along and that is his only reason for being with Ana, but Ana dismisses his concerns. Ana decides to turn Wilma's home, Gut Thalheim, into a horse sanctuary. Philipp asks Ana to marry him and an overjoyed Ana accepts. Natalie is in love with Vincent, but realises that he will never get over Ana and tells him the truth about Philipp's scheme. Vincent is devastated and angrily confronts Philipp, who finally confesses the truth to Ana. Ana tells Philipp she never wants to see him again. Natalie leaves Bichelheim, but Philipp decides to stay and fight for Ana.

Ana is badly injured in a riding accident. Ana later learns she will need a kidney transplant. All of the people in her life get tested to be her donor and Vincent ends up being a match. Vincent donates his kidney to Ana, who makes a full recovery. Ana is torn between Philipp and Vincent and is not sure who she should be with. Ana eventually decides on Vincent. However, Ana soon realises that as wonderful a man as Vincent is, she only chose him out of gratitude and that Philipp is the love of her life. Ana reunites with Philipp and asks him to marry her. The two marry in a gorgeous ceremony on Gut Thalheim, where they will begin their new life. Despite everything, Philipp is the candidate who won Ana's heart, proving that you never forget your first love.

=== Season 21: Maxi Saalfeld and Henry Sydow ===
Maxi Neubach comes to Bichelheim to stay with her mother Katja and write her doctoral thesis. After drugging Christoph Saalfeld, her medical license is revoked and she now has to figure out her next step in life. Maxi becomes a manager at the Fürstenhof and forms a close relationship with Werner. Maxi decides to take on the Saalfeld name to cement her place at the Fürstenhof. Maxi discovers that the Fürstenhof has a gambling license and expresses interest in opening a casino at the hotel. At a casino in Vienna, Maxi meets a charming, handsome man at a roulette table and instantly falls in love with him. The dashing stranger is Henry Sydow, who arrives in Bichelheim a short time later. Henry is happy to be reunited with Vincent, who was his childhood best friend, and gets a job as stableoy.

Maxi and Henry fall madly in love with each other. However, Henry is hiding things from his past. His secrets start to unravel with the arrival of Sophia Wagner, Henry's estranged mother. Henry cut off contact with his mother when he found out she was a crime lord rather than a businesswoman. Henry conceals his connection from Sophia from everybody. Sophia plans to take the Fürstenhof from the Saalfelds and wants Henry's help, but he vehemently refuses. Sophia threatens to harm Maxi if he does not help her so he complies. Sophia succeeds and becomes the owner of the Fürstenhof. Henry finally reveals to Maxi that he is Sophia's son and his role in helping her take the hotel. Maxi is disgusted and breaks up with him.

Larissa Mahnke, a Sydow family friend and heiress to a gemstone fortune, arrives at the Fürstenhof. Sophia believes that Larissa is the right woman for Henry. Maxi and Henry get back together. Upon learning that Larissa will receive an even bigger inheritance if she marries, Sophia orders Henry to marry her, but he refuses. Sophia poisons Maxi and she almost dies. Sophia tells Henry that this time was a warning, but next time she will kill Maxi if he does not end his relationship with her. Henry breaks up with Maxi, leaving her (and him) heartbroken. On his mother's orders, Henry becomes engaged to Larissa, who has actually fallen in love with him. Henry cares about Larissa, but does not feel the same way. Larissa grows close to Yannick Rudloff and eventually she and Henry agree to call off the engagement.

Maxi and Henry know they are destined for one another and decide to be together. Sophia is forced into witness protection when her crimes are revealed, but finally makes peace with her son before she leaves. Maxi and Henry marry in a gorgeous ceremony at the Fürstenhof. They later depart for Hamburg where they will manage a hotel together.

=== Season 22: Fanny Schätzl and Kilian Rudloff/Fanny Schätzl and Marlon Ständler ===
Note: This season marks the first time the dream couple changed during the season. Fanny and Kilian were established as the dream couple, then it later switched to Fanny and Marlon.

Down-to-earth Fanny Schätzl arrives in Bichelheim to visit her cousin, Erik, who she has not had the best relationship with. She later gets a job as a gardener at the Fürstenhof and moves in with the Sonnbichlers. She falls in love with Vincent Ritter, but he only wants friendship. Fanny meets Kilian Rudloff, the brother of her good friend Yannick. Adventurous, charismatic Kilian, a professional chef, has come to Bichelheim to attend Yannick's wedding to Larissa Mahnke. After Kilian makes her a dessert, they spend the night together and Fanny is smitten with him. The pair soon fall madly in love. Yannick's divorce from his wife is not yet final, but he has to marry Larissa before her birthday so she can receive her full inheritance. Kilian agrees to marry Larissa and in return he will receive money to open a restaurant. Fanny is shocked to learn of Kilian's marriage, but he assures her it is purely a business arrangement.

Kilian becomes head chef at the Fürstenhof. Kilian and Fanny's relationship blossoms despite the less than ideal situation. Larissa's devious cousin Stephan Mahnke comes to the Fürstenhof, determined to prove her marriage is a sham and get the inheritance for himself. Larissa and Kilian now have to put on a show of being in love, which upsets their respective partners. Larissa actually falls in love with Kilian and schemes to break up him and Fanny so their sham marriage can become a real one.

Larissa's machinations cause Kilian and Fanny to break up. Kilian agrees to give his marriage to Larissa a real chance, but he is still fixated on Fanny. Fanny meets handsome forester Marlon Ständler, who is instantly smitten with her, but she finds his gruff personality unappealing. Eventually, Fanny and Marlon bond over their passion for nature and Fanny finds a kind, caring person underneath Marlon's hard exterior. When Marlon and Fanny become a couple, Kilian can barely hide his jealousy. Larissa worries Kilian will leave her for Fanny so she becomes pregnant to trap him, but has a miscarriage. Fanny agrees to move to California with Marlon, but then she realises she cannot give up on Kilian so a heartbroken Marlon leaves by himself. Kilian and Fanny finally reunite, but Larissa vows to fight for her husband.

Fanny and Kilian constantly have to deal with Larissa's manipulations, but they do not allow her to split them up again. Marlon returns to Bichelheim and declares his love for Fanny, but she turns him down. However, there is still an undeniable connection between Fanny and Marlon, but Fanny stands by Kilian and they become engaged. As Fanny tries on her wedding dress, she has a panic attack and realises it is because Marlon is the love of her life not Kilian. Fanny ends her engagement to Kilian, explaining what they had was lost a long time ago.

season 23 emilia jakobi und massimo foghetti

== Protagonists ==
=== List of protagonists ===
Actor	Character	Episodes & duration	Guest appearances	Background information
Season 1 • Episodes 1–313
Henriette Richter-Röhl	Laura Saalfeld, née Mahler	1–313 (2005–2007)	998–1001 (2010)	daughter of Werner & Susanne; adoptive daughter of Peter; paternal half-sister of Alexander (adoptive), Robert, Sandra, Konstantin, Moritz & William; aunt of Joshua, Valentina, Miguel and Anna; niece of André; cousin of Simon & Sabrina; mother of Hannah & Leander; wife of Alexander
Gregory B. Waldis	Alexander Saalfeld	1–313 (2005–2007)	385–387, 500–505 (2007); 1610–1628 (2013); 1999–2002 (2014); 2999–3001 (2018); 4996−5001 (2025)	son of Alfons & Charlotte; adoptive son of Werner; stepson of Hildegard; adoptive grandson of Ludwig & Helene Saalfeld; maternal half-brother of Robert; paternal half-brother of Marie & Melli; adoptive paternal half-brother of Laura, Sandra, Konstantin, Moritz & William; uncle of Joshua, Valentina, Miguel, Anna, Finn & Clara; nephew of André, Beatrice, Elisabeth & Gottfried; cousin of Simon, Sabrina, David, Desirée, Felix, Christoph, Linda, Leonie, Erik, Florian, Eva & Vanessa; father of Hannah, Leander, & Massimo; ex-husband of Katherina; husband of Laura
Season 2 • Episodes 314–520
Lorenzo Patané	Robert Saalfeld	1–520 (2005–2007)		son of Werner & Charlotte; adoptive grandson of Ludwig & Helene Saalfeld; maternal half-brother of Alexander; paternal half-brother of Laura, Sandra, Konstantin, Moritz & William; uncle of Leander, Hannah, Miguel, Anna, & Massimo; nephew of André, Beatrice, Elisabeth & Gottfried; cousin of Simon, Sabrina, David, Desirée, Felix, Christoph, Linda, Leonie, Erik & Florian; father of Joshua & Valentina; widower of Miriam; ex-husband of Eva
Inez Bjørg David	Miriam Saalfeld, née von Heidenberg † (1117)	189–520 (2006–2007)	739–742 (2008); Died in episode 1117 (2010)	daughter of Wolfgang & Caroline; stepdaughter of Barbara; mother of Valentina; ex-wife of Felix; wife of Robert
Season 3 • Episodes 521–703
Christof Arnold	Dr. Gregor Bergmeister	134–704 (2006–2008)	2393–2398 (2016)	husband of Samia
Dominique Siassia	Samia Bergmeister, née Obote, prev. Gruber	356–704 (2007–2008)		daughter of Joshua & Vera; wife of Gregor
Season 4 • Episodes 704–914
Martin Gruber	Felix Saalfeld, née Tarrasch	273–914 (2006–2009)	1022–1025 (2010); 1754–1755 (2013)	biological son of Johann & Elisabeth; adoptive son of Mr. & Mrs. Tarrasch; grandson of Ludwig & Helene Saalfeld; adoptive brother of Viktoria; nephew of Charlotte, Cosima & Gottfried; cousin of Robert, Alexander, Lukas, Markus, Lena, Linda & Christoph; father of Max & Moritz; ex-husband of Miriam; husband of Emma
Ivanka Brekalo	Emma Saalfeld, née Strobl	590–914 (2008–2009)	1019–1025 (2010); 1753–1755 (2013)	daughter of Karl & Liesl; maternal half-sister of Rosalie; mother of Max & Mortiz; wife of Felix
Season 5 • Episodes 915–1117
Wolfgang Cerny	Lukas Zastrow	897–1117 (2009–2010)		son of Götz & Cosima; biological grandson of Ludwig & Helene Saalfeld; brother of Markus & Lena; nephew of Beatrice, Elisabeth & Gottfried; cousin of David, Desirée, Felix, Linda & Christoph; adoptive father of Anna; ex-husband of Rosalie; husband of Sandra
Sarah Stork	Sandra Zastrow, née Ostermeyer	934–1117 (2009–2010)	3000 (2018)	daughter of Werner of Astrid; paternal half-sister of Alexander (adoptive), Robert, Laura, Konstantin, Moritz & William; aunt of Hannah, Leander, Joshua, Valentina, & Massimo; niece of André; cousin of Simon & Sabrina; adoptive mother of Anna; wife of Lukas
Season 6 • Episodes 1118–1391
Uta Kargel	Eva Saalfeld, née Krendlinger	1087–1391, 2886–3381 (2010–2011, 2018–2020)	2791–2797 (2017)	daughter of Gustl of Liesl; maternal half-sister of Jacob; niece of Alfons; cousin of Alexander, Marie, Melli & Vanessa; adoptive mother of Valentina; mother of Emilio; ex-wife of Robert
Lorenzo Patané	Robert Saalfeld	1–520, 1099–1391, 2858–4133 (2005–2007, 2010–2011, 2018–2023)	998–1001 (2010); 2656–2663 (2017); 2789-2797 (2017)	see Season 2
Season 7 • Episodes 1392–1600
Ines Lutz	Theresa Burger, née Nina Westphal	1377–1600 (2011–2012)		biological daughter of Eugen & Nicola; adoptive daughter of Hans & Karoline; ex-wife of Konstantin; wife of Moritz
Daniel Fünffrock	Moritz van Norden, née Nero	1408–1600 (2011–2012)	3000–3002 (2018)	son of Werner of Doris; adoptive son of Günther; twin brother of Konstantin; paternal half-brother of Alexander (adoptive), Robert, Sandra, Laura & William; uncle of Hannah, Leander, Miguel, Anna, Joshua, Valentina, & Massimo; nephew of André; nephew of André; cousin of Simon & Sabrina; husband of Theresa
Season 8 • Episodes 1601–1814
Moritz Tittel	Konstantin Riedmüller, née Nero	1391–1814 (2011–2013)	2304-2307 (2015); 3000-3002 (2018)	biological son of Werner & Doris; adoptive son of Miguel; twin brother of Moritz; paternal half-brother of Alexander (adoptive), Robert, Sandra, Laura, & William; uncle of Hannah, Leander, Anna, Joshua, Valentina, & Massimo; nephew of André; cousin of Simon & Sabrina; father of Miguel; ex-husband of Theresa; husband of Marlene
Lucy Scherer	Marlene Riedmüller, née Schweitzer	1570–1814 (2012–2013)	3000-3002 (2018)	daughter of Veit & Natascha; niece of Poppy; mother of Miguel; wife of Konstantin
Season 9 • Episodes 1815–2066
Christian Feist	Leonard Stahl	1778–2066 (2013–2014)	2261–2265 (2015); 2747-2753 (2017); 3398–3413 (2020)	son of Friedrich & Gabrielle; brother of Niklas & Sophie; paternal half-brother of Luisa, Martin, Mila, Mara & Frederick; father of Gabriel; adoptive father of Mila; ex-husband of Patrizia; husband of Pauline
Liza Tzschirner	Pauline Stahl, née Jentzsch	1781–2066 (2013–2014)	2261–2265 (2015); 2747-2753 (2017); 3398–3413 (2020)	granddaughter of Erich & Elfriede von Weyersbrunn; mother of Gabriel; adoptive mother of Mila; wife of Leonard
Season 10 • Episodes 2067–2265
Jennifer Newrkla	Julia Stahl, née Wegener	2053–2265 (2014–2015)		sister of Sebastian; wife of Niklas
Jan Hartmann	Niklas Stahl	2062–2265 (2014–2015)		son of Friedrich & Gabrielle; brother of Leonard & Sophie; paternal half-brother of Luisa, Martin, Mila, Mara & Frederick; ex-husband of Patrizia; husband of Julia
Season 11 • Episodes 2266–2502
Kai Albrecht	Sebastian Wegener	2053–2502 (2014–2016)		brother of Julia; father of Paul; ex-husband of Isabelle; husband of Luisa
Magdalena Steinlein	Luisa Wegener, née Reisiger, prev. Hofer	2248–2502 (2015–2016)		daughter of Friedrich & Marta; adoptive daughter of Hermann; paternal half-sister of Leonard, Niklas, Sophie, Martin, Mila, Mara & Frederick; stepmother of Paul; ex-wife of David; wife of Sebastian
Season 12 • Episodes 2503–2692
Jeannine Michèle Wacker	Clara Lechner née Morgenstern	2473–2693 (2016–2017)	2901–2903 (2018); 4996−5001 (2025)	daughter of Melli; biological granddaughter of Alfons & Gerti; niece of Alexander & Marie; cousin of Hannah, Leander & Finn; mother of Junichiro; wife of Adrian
Max Alberti	Adrian Lechner	2487–2693 (2016–2017)		son of Hagan & Susan; maternal half-brother of William; father of Junichiro; ex-husband of Desirée; husband of Clara
Season 13 • Episodes 2693–2812
Alexander Milz	William Newcombe, née Lechner	2577–2812 (2016–2017)	2842–2857, 3000 (2018)	son of Werner & Susan; adoptive son of Hagan; maternal half-brother of Adrian; paternal half-brother of Alexander (adoptive), Robert, Sandra, Laura, Konstantin & Moritz; uncle of Hannah, Leander, Miguel, Anna, Joshua & Valentina; nephew of André; cousin of Simon & Sabrina; husband of Rebecca
Victoria Licht	Eleonore "Ella" Kessler	2677–2812 (2017)		niece of Thomas; cousin of Tina
Julia Alice Ludwig	Rebecca Newcombe, née Herz	2682–2812 (2017)		biological daughter of Astrid Westkamp; adoptive daughter of Mr. & Mrs. Herz; wife of William
Season 14 • Episodes 2813–3019
Sebastian Fischer	Viktor Saalfeld	2761–3019 (2017–2018)	3102–3107, 3118 (2019); 3261–3264 (2019)	son of Christoph & Xenia; grandson of Gottfried; brother of Boris, Tim & Denise; maternal half-brother of Annabelle; paternal half-brother of Eleni & Emilio; uncle of Natalie & Nala; nephew of Linda; cousin of Steffen & Carolin; father of Mia; husband of Alicia
Larissa Marolt	Dr. Alicia Saalfeld, née Lindbergh	2745–3019 (2017–2018)	3102–3107 (2019)	granddaughter of Anna; sister of Paul; aunt of Luna; mother of Mia; ex-wife of Christoph; wife of Viktor
Season 15 • Episodes 3020–3264
Julian Schneider	Joshua Winter, née. Zellweger	2994–3264 (2018–2019)		biological son of Robert & Madeline; adoptive son of Henning & Bianca; grandson of Werner & Charlotte; paternal half-brother of Valentina; husband of Denise
Helen Barke	Denise Winter, née Saalfeld	3005–3264 (2018–2019)		daughter of Christoph & Xenia; sister of Viktor, Boris & Tim; maternal half-sister of Annabelle; paternal half-sister Eleni & Emilio; aunt of Mia, Natalie & Nala; niece of Linda; wife of Joshua
Season 16 • Episodes 3265–3515
Léa Wegmann	Franziska "Franzi" Saalfeld, née Krummbiegl	3223–3515 (2019–2020)		niece of Margit; mother of Natalie; wife of Tim
Florian Frowein	Tim Saalfeld, née Degen	3225–3515 (2019–2020)		biological son of Christoph & Xenia; adoptive son of Harald & Gerda; identical twin brother of Boris; brother of Viktor & Denise; maternal half-brother of Annabelle; paternal half-brother of Eleni & Emilio; uncle of Mia & Nala; nephew of Linda; cousin of Steffen & Carolin; father of Natalie; widower of Nadja; husband of Franzi
Season 17 • Episodes 3516–3729
Christina Arends	Maja Vogt, née von Thalheim	3491–3722 (2020–2021)	3949–3952 (2022)	daughter of Cornelius; adoptive daughter of Selina; paternal half-sister of Constanze & Pascal; mother of Lea; wife of Florian
Arne Löber	Florian Vogt	3491–3729 (2020–2021)	3949–3952 (2022); 4027–4038 (2023)	son of Lothar; biological grandson of Ludwig Saalfeld; brother of Erik; uncle of Josie; father of Lea; husband of Maja
Season 18 • Episodes 3713–3957
Sandro Kirtzel	Paul Klee, née Lindbergh	2824–3460, 3713–3957 (2017–2020, 2021–2023)		grandson of Anna; brother of Alicia; uncle of Mia; father of Luna; widower of Romy; husband of Josie
Lena Conzendorf	Josephine "Josie" Klee	3712–3957 (2021–2023)	4018-4020 (2023); 4185-4188, 4201 (2024)	daughter of Ricky & Yvonne; adoptive daughter of Erik; niece of Florian; stepmother of Luna; wife of Paul
Season 19 • Episodes 3958–4151
Marcel Zuschlag	Peter "Leander" Saalfeld	3949–4151 (2022–2023)	4996−5001 (2025)	son of Alexander & Laura; grandson of Alfons, Werner, Susanne & Charlotte; brother of Hannah; paternal half-brother of Massimo; nephew of Robert, Sandra, Konstatin, Moritz & William; cousin of Valentina & Joshua; father of Nala; husband of Eleni
Dorothée Neff	Eleni Saalfeld, née Schwarzbach	3910–4151 (2022–2023)		daughter of Christoph & Alexandra; adoptive daughter of Markus; paternal half-sister of Viktor, Boris, Tim, Denise & Emilio; maternal half-sister of Noah & Vroni; adoptive paternal half-sister of Annabelle (from Christoph) & Vincent (from Markus); aunt of Mia & Natalie; niece of Linda; cousin of Steffen & Carolin; mother of Nala; wife of Leander
Season 20 • Episodes 4152–4334
Robin Schick	Philipp Alves née Brandes	4140–4332 (2023–2024)		son of Roland; great-nephew of Wilma; husband of Ana
Martin Walde	Dr. Vincent Ritter	4152– 4607 (2023–)2026		son of Markus & Jackie; paternal half-brother of Eleni (adoptive), Noah & Vroni; uncle of Nala; ex-husband of Natalie
Soluna-Delta Kokol	Ana Alves	4143–4332 (2023–2024)		daughter of Nicole; wife of Philipp
Season 21 • Episodes 4335− 4485
Elias Reichert	Henry Saalfeld née Sydow	4326–4484 (2024–2025 )	4529-4532 (2026)	son of Sophia, husband of Maxi
Katharina Schueba	Maxi Saalfeld née Neubach	4267– 4484 (2024–2025 )	4639-4642 2026	daughter of Katja & Thomas; sister of Pia & Leo; wife of Henry
Season 22 • Episodes 4486−4665
Frederik Bott	Marlon Ständler	4553– 4665 (2026		best friend of fritz husband of fanny
Anthony Paul	Kilian Rudloff	4474– 4663 (2025–2026		brother of Yannick; uncle of Linus & Frieda; ex husband of Larissa ex fiancee of fanny
Johanna Graen	Fanny standler nee schatzl	4346– 4665 (2025-2026		daughter of Brigette & Andreas; paternal half-sister of Fritz; cousin of Erik & Florian wife of marlon

== Characters ==
=== Current protagonists ===
emilia jakobi

massimo foghetti

=== Current main characters ===
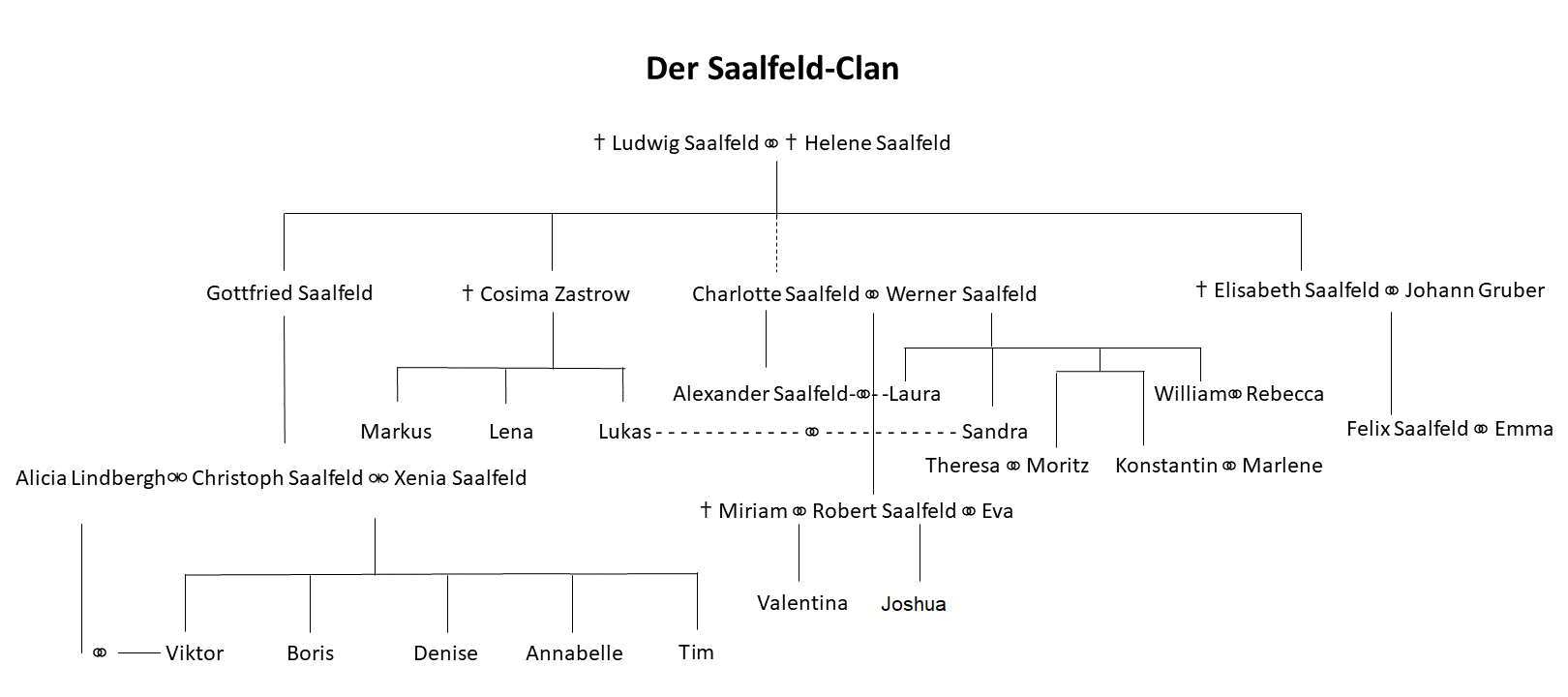
The Saalfeld Family Tree

Adam saalfeld is a former police officer who pretends to be Werner's long-lost grandson, Massimo Foghetti (who was in a coma). Adam needs money to get his girlfriend Sandy out of prostitution. Adam eventually confesses his real identity, but the people in his life forgive him. However, when Massimo comes to Bichelheim Adam has to face the consequences of his actions.

Alfons and Hildegard (née Hansen) Sonnbichler are the flagship couple and have been employees of the Fürstenhof for decades; she as a sous chef, and he as the very capable head porter. Their daughter, Marie, lives in London with her family. Alfons and Hildegard are extremely loyal to the Saalfelds and enjoy a special relationship of mutual trust with them. Alfons had a relationship as a teenager with Charlotte Saalfeld, and they had a child together, Alexander, who was raised by Werner. Alfons has a daughter, Melli Morgenstern, with his former girlfriend, Gerti Schönfeld. Hildegard is involved in the local city council and was a candidate for mayor. The pair are known for their perfect marriage and generosity. They often open up their home to newcomers in Bichelheim.

Christoph Saalfeld is the son of Charlotte Saalfeld's estranged brother, Gottfried. He is one of the shareholders of the Fürstenhof and the founder of Top Comfort, a hotel chain with branches worldwide. Unlike the rest of the Saalfelds, he grew up poor due to Gottfried's gambling addiction. Christoph fought his way to the top with an iron will. He can appear charming and engaging as well as dominant and threatening. Christoph's first love was Alexandra Bamberg (later Schwarzbach) and they had even been engaged, but he left her for his first wife, Xenia. Xenia came from a wealthy family and could further Christoph's career aspirations. They had four beautiful children together: Viktor, Boris, Annabelle and Denise (another child Tim would be discovered later). Christoph discovered Xenia was having an affair and blackmailed her into leaving the family. He then raised his children by himself and was a loving, but controlling father. Christoph plans to make the Fürstenhof his family seat, as he sees himself as the only legitimate successor to his grandfather, Ludwig Saalfeld, since he is a biological Saalfeld unlike Charlotte and Robert. He has been married to Xenia (twice) and Alicia Lindbergh. He is the biological father of Viktor, Boris, Tim, Eleni, Denise, Emilio and the adoptive father of Annabelle. He is the grandfather of Mia, Natalie and Nala.

His most memorable times in Bichelhem include a love triangle between himself, his son Viktor and Alicia, affairs with Alexandra Schwarzbach, Eva Saalfeld, and Sophia Wagner, an engagement to Selina von Thalheim, meeting his previously unknown children Eleni and Tim, the revelation that he was molested as a child (which resulted in him rejecting his son Boris for being gay), being framed by Xenia for the attempted murder of Boris's boyfriend Tobias Ehrlinger, surviving a plane crash, being in a coma after being run down by Valentina Saalfeld, Ariane Kalenberg's revenge on him, being framed for Tom Dammann's "murder" (Tom had faked his death to frame him) and constant power struggles over control of the Fürstenhof with Robert, Werner and others.

Erik Klee (née Vogt) is the restaurant manager at the Fürstenhof. When he first arrives at the Fürstenhof, he takes up the position as PR manager. Erik learns that he belongs to the Saalfeld family (his father was an illegitimate child of Ludwig Saalfeld), which means that he and his younger brother Florian are entitled to land rights. He sets his sights on the scheming Ariane Kalenberg and quickly becomes her lover and accomplice. He helps Ariane with numerous intrigues against the Saalfelds. Erik's complicity in a financial scandal comes to light, which four years earlier had led to Cornelius von Thalheim being framed for the scandal and having to go on the lam. Erik loses everything after being convicted for his crimes, but slowly builds trust again with the Saalfelds. Erik is shocked when he learns he is the father of Yvonne Klee's daughter Josie. It is revealed that he is not Josie's father, but they remain close and Josie allows Erik to adopt her. He is currently married to Yvonne.

Fritz Drechsler is a porter at the Fürstenhof. He is the long-lost half-brother of Fanny Schätzl and the best of friend Marlon Ständler. He aspires to be as great a porter as his role model Alfons Sonnbichler. He is currently in a relationship with Lale Ceylan.

Katja Saalfeld is the Fürstenhof sommelier. She is the niece of Ludwig Saalfeld (her father was his brother). She comes to Bichelheim fresh off a difficult divorce. She has a son, Leo, and two daughters, Pia and Maxi, with her ex-husband, Thomas. She is immediately drawn to Markus Schwarzbach, but their relationship is undermined by his manipulations against her family to take the Füstenhof and sell it. Katja develops feelings for Markus's son, Vincent Ritter, and they have an affair.

Lale Ceylan is a fitness trainer at the Fürstenhof and a fitness influencer on social media. She came to Bichelheim for her cousin Shirin's wedding. She was engaged to Theo Licht before his tragic death. She is now in a relationship with Fritz Drechsler.

Larissa Mahnke is the food and beverage manager at the Fürstenhof. Glamorous and ambitious, Larissa was the heiress to a gemstone fortune. Sophia Wagner is very fond of Larissa and thinks she would be a good match for her son, Henry. Larissa falls in love with Henry, but he is still in love with Maxi Saalfeld. Larissa then falls in love with Dr. Yannick Rudloff. Larissa marries Yannick's brother Kilian to receive her inheritance. However, Larissa falls in love with Kilian and tries to come between Kilian and his true love, Fanny Schätzl.

Massimo Foghetti is a sommelier at the Fürstenhof. The handsome, charming Italian is the illegitimate son of Alexander Saalfeld, the product of a fling with an Italian woman when he was 17. Massimo grew up on a vineyard in South Tyrol. While Massimo was in a coma, Adam Fischer stole his identity. Massimo comes to Bichelheim to claim his birthright and get revenge on Adam. Massimo is instantly smitten with Olivia Jakobi, who just so happens to be Adam's girlfriend.

Olivia Jakobi is a maid at the Fürstenhof and the older sister of Elias. Olivia was lonely in Hamburg so she decides to join Elias in Bichelheim. She and her brother share a dark secret, Elias murdered their abusive father and together they sunk his body into a moor. She falls in love with Adam Fisher (who at the time was posing as Massimo Foghetti). When the truth comes out about Adam's identity, Olivia forgives him and they start a brief relationship.

Dr. Yannick Rudloff is a recently divorced father of two who comes to Bichelheim to take over the medical practice from Michael while he deals with his illness abroad. He moves into the Sonnbichler house. He has a brief romantic involvement with Greta Bergmann, but they decide to just be friends. Yannick falls in love with Larissa Mahnke, who is engaged to Henry. Once their engagement, ends, Larissa and Yannick become a couple. When Yannick is unable to get a divorce in time to marry Larissa so she can receive her inheritance, his younger brother Kilian steps in to marry her. Yannick believes this is just a setback for his happily ever after with Larissa, but then Larissa realises she is with the wrong brother.

Yvonne Klee is the bar manager at the Fürstenhof and the owner of Lieblings Café. She arrives in Bichelheim to visit her daughter, Josie. Yvonne was a young mother, who was unable to cope with raising a child by herself so she left Josie in the care of her late mother. Yvonne and Josie have a complicated relationship because of this, but Yvonne hopes she can make up for lost time. She runs into her ex-boyfriend Erik Vogt and reveals he is Josie's father, although this later proves not to be true. Yvonne starts dating Christoph Saalfeld, but it does not last since he is not interested in a serious relationship. Erik and Yvonne fall in love again. Yvonne is diagnosed with breast cancer, but thankfully recovers after receiving treatment. Yvonne is currently married to Erik.

=== Current recurring characters ===
Antonia Wiener- Justice of the peace, often appears when there is a wedding
DI Siggi Meyser- Detective Inspector from the local police, often appears when there is a crime to investigate

== Cast ==
=== Main cast ===
Actor	Character	Episodes	Duration
Sepp Schauer	Alfons Sonnbichler	1–	2005–
Antje Hagen	Hildegard Sonnbichler	1–	2005–
Dieter Bach	Christoph Saalfeld	2729–	2017–
Sven Waasner	Erik Klee	3493–	2020−
Tanja Launus	Yvonne Klee	3753–	2022−
Yeliz Simsek	Lale Ceylan	4019–	2023−
Isabel Stern	Katja Saalfeld	4138–	2023–
Jo Weil	Dr. Yannik Rudloff	4369–	2025–
Anna Karolna Berger	Larissa Mahnke	4496 –	2025–
Thimo Meitner	Fritz Drechsler	4471–	2025–
Soraya-Keltoum Bouabsa	Olivia Jakobi	4503–	2025–
Philip Birnstiel	Adam saalfeld geb fischer	4514–	2025–
Jaime Ferkic	Massimo Foghetti	4617–	2026–
hannah werner	frida rudloff	4636--	2026-
pippa fee rupperti	emilia jakobi	4659-	2026-
roberto capasso	sinan ceylan	4668-	2026-

=== Recurring cast ===
Actor	Character	Episodes	Duration
Christoph Krix	Detective Inspector Siggi Meyser	93–	2006–
Stefanie Oestreich	Justice of the Peace Antonia Wiener	1359–	2011–

=== Named extras ===
Actor	Character	Episodes	Duration
Michael Sandorov	Page Peter Müller	2–	2005–
Hanno Dobiat	Waiter Hanno	481–	2007–
Biggi Gras	Waitress Biggi	1527–	2012–
Jakob Spieler	Waiter Gustl Brandt	2998–4177	2018–2024
Aurelia Waßmuth	Kitchen helper Aurelia	3116–4294	2019–2024
Manuel Niedermeier	Waiter Manuel	3666–	2021–
Patrick Christopher Ehler	Porter Marcel	3977–	2023–

=== Former main cast members ===
Actor	Character	Episodes	Duration
Claudia Wenzel	Corinna ″Cora″ Franke	1–110	2005–2006
Wookie Mayer	Viola Hochleitner, née Liebertz	107–184; 283–298; 1038–1043; 1251–1262; 1550–1560	2006; 2006–2007; 2010; 2011; 2012
Simone Heher	Katharina Klinker-Emden	4–194	2005–2006
Isabella Jantz	Marie Sonnbichler #1	3–289	2005–2006
Miriam Krause	Helen Marinelli	169–313; 938–980; 1193–1205	2006–2007; 2009; 2010
Florian Böhm	Mike Dreschke † (516)	1–101; 219–371	2005–2006; 2006–2007
Wayne Carpendale	Lars Hoffmann † (371)	69–155; 312–372	2006; 2007
Susanne Huber	Elisabeth Gruber, née Saalfeld † (689)	156–451; 663–698	2006–2007; 2008
Mirja Mahir	Nora Dammann, née Hansen	336–471	2007
Isabelle von Siebenthal	Vera Obote, née Roth	425–580	2007–2008
Anna Angelina Wolfers	Leonie Preisinger	455–602	2007–2008
Wayne Carpendale	Marc Kohlweyer, née Hoffmann	517–602	2007–2008
Caroline Beil	Fiona Marquardt † (668)	477–676	2007–2008
Jessica Boehrs	Jana Schneider	572–703	2008
Susan Hoecke	Viktoria Tarrasch	329–848; 912–914	2007–2009
Michael Zittel	Johann Gruber	247–711; 813–866; 906–914	2006–2008; 2009; 2009
Heike Trinker	Dr. Evelyn Konopka	707–866	2008–2009
Lilâ Nil Gürmen	Franziska „Fanny“ Schönbauer	866–934	2009
Annabelle Leip	Marie Bruckner, née Sonnbichler #2	713–1021; 1581–1592; 1743–1749	2008–2010; 2012; 2013
Golo Euler	Hendrik Bruckner	869–1021; 1587–1592; 1743–1749	2009–2010; 2012; 2013
Gabrielle Scharnitzky	Cosima Saalfeld †, née Charlotte Saalfeld prev. Hofer & Zastrow	894–1112	2009–2010
René Oltmanns	Simon Konopka	485–1190; 2076–2081	2007–2010; 2014
Johannes Hauer	Benedikt „Ben“ Sponheim	504–1193	2007–2010
Eva-Maria May	Katja Heinemann (alias Kai Krone)	991–1078; 1167–1195	2010
Andreas Borcherding	Götz Zastrow †	1054–1296	2010–2011
Tobias Dürr	Markus Zastrow	1212–1372	2010–2011
Nicola Tiggeler	Barbara von Heidenberg, née Sachtleben † (2700) (alias Sylvia Wielander, née Schröder) (alias Consuela Morales-Diaz)	165–476; 721–883; 1090–1384; 1848–1902	2006–2007; 2008–2009; 2010–2011; 2013
Johanna Bönninghaus	Lena Zastrow	1114–1117; 1156–1387	2010–2011
Andreas Thiele	Jacob Krendlinger	1082–1089; 1119–1396	2010–2011
Julia Mitrici	Sibylle Prinzessin von Liechtenberg	1301–1420	2011
Kathleen Fiedler	Brigitte „Gitti“ König	1364–1496	2011–2012
Judith Hildebrandt	Tanja Liebertz	1–529; 957–1599	2005–2008; 2009–2012
Lili Gesler	Elena Majoré	1398–1635	2011–2012
Lara Mandoki	Mandy Meier	1562–1728	2012–2013
Jan van Weyde	Xaver Steindle	12–471; 516–519; 761–835; 1291–1765; 1984–1988; 2364–2367	2005–2007; 2007; 2009; 2011–2013; 2014; 2015
Mareike Lindenmeyer	Kira Steindle, née König	1610–1765	2012–2013
Michele Oliveri	Julius König, née Engel † (1771)	1399–1773, 1787	2011–2013
Simone Ritscher	Doris van Norden, née. Dolores Nero	1366–1794	2011–2013
Saša Kekez	Goran Kalkbrenner	1755–2006; 2924–2961	2013–2014; 2018
David Paryla	Martin Windgassen	1599–2053; 2063–2066	2012–2014
Sarah Elena Timpe	Sabrina Heinemann, née Görres † (2071)	1619–2070; 2118, 2128–2132	2012–2014
Mirjam Heimann	Cornelia „Coco“ Conradi	1781–2110	2013–2014
Sebastian Fritz	Jonas Dammann, née Nebel #2	2014–2069; 2095–2238	2014–2015
Yannik Meyer	Norman Kowald #1	2215–2246	2015
Nadine Warmuth	Patrizia Dietrich † (2263)	1796–2264	2013–2015
Birte Wentzek	Penelope „Poppy“ Saalfeld, née Schweitzer † (2426)	2091–2412; 2428, 2432, 3000	2014–2016 (2016, 2018)
Niklas Löffler	Norman Kowald #2	2247–2470	2015–2016
Michael Kühl	David Hofer † (2896)	2267–2705	2015–2017
Philip Butz	Oskar Reiter	2509–2726	2016–2017
Louisa von Spies	Desirée Bramigk	2492–2748; 2885–2897; 2915–2937; 3186–3189	2016–2017; 2018; 2018; 2019
Dietrich Adam	Friedrich Stahl † (2746)	1784–2751, 2765	2013–2017
Isabella Hübner	Beatrice Stahl, née Hofer † (2814)	2239–2815; 2815–2816, 2819, 2826–2828, 2839, 2841	2015–2017 (2017–2018)
Marion Mitterhammer	Susan Newcombe née Joanne Newcombe	2577–2594; 2660–2855	2016; 2017–2018
Mona Seefried	Charlotte Saalfeld (née Cosima Hofer)	1–150; 295–381; 560–712; 857–2921	2005–2006; 2007; 2008; 2009–2018
Florian Stadler	Nils Heinemann	726–2937; 3186–3189	2008–2018; 2019
Bojana Golenac	Melanie „Melli“ Konopka, née Schönfeld, prev. Morganstern	2476–2969	2016–2018
Elke Winkens	Xenia Saalfeld †	2856–3106; 3115, 3118	2018–2019
Florian Frowein	Boris Saalfeld	2727–3110, 3118; 3148–3150; 3226–3231; 3252–3268; 3347–3349; 3512–3515	2017–2019; 2019; 2019; 2019; 2020; 2020
Max Beier	Tobias Saalfeld, née Ehrlinger	2945–3110; 3225–3231; 3512–3515	2018–2019; 2019; 2020
Christin Balogh	Tina Kessler	1763–3188; 3806–3819	2013–2019; 2022
Désirée von Delft	Romy Lindbergh, née Ehrlinger † (3229)	2816–3230, 3246, 3324, 3328, 3330, 3563	2017–2019 (2020, 2021)
Lukas Schmidt	Fabien Liebertz #3	2544–3284; 3338–3343; 3392–3401	2016–2019; 2020; 2020
Paulina Hobratschk	Valentina Saalfeld #2	2857–3284; 3334–3337; 3390–3395; 3464–3470	2018–2019; 2020; 2020; 2020
Isabell Ege	Jessica Bronckhorst	2817–3303	2017–2020
Patrick Dollmann	Dr. Henry Achleitner	3111–3303	2019–2020
Jenny Löffler	Annabelle Sullivan, née Saalfeld	3005–3339	2018–2020
Anna Lena Class	Nadja Saalfeld, née Holler † (3374)	3288–3375	2019–2020
Melanie Wiegmann	Natascha Schweitzer	1586–3390	2012–2020
Markus Pfeiffer	Dirk Baumgartner	3297–3431	2019–2020
Franz-Xaver Zeller	Bela Moser	3155–3202; 3269–3442	2019–2020
Julia Grimpe	Linda Baumgartner, née Saalfeld	3233–3446	2019–2020
Christopher Reinhardt	Steffen Baumgartner	3345–3485	2020
Julia Gruber	Amelie Limbach	3400–3540	2020–2021
Jennifer Siemann	Lucy Ehrlinger	3190–3563	2019–2021
Pablo Konrad	Johannes „Hannes“ Fröhlich	3626–3714	2021
Katja Rosin	Selina Freifrau von Thalheim	3451–3749	2020–2022
Deborah Müller	Cornelia „Lia“ Holle, née Gschwend	3428–3811	2020–2022
Viola Wedekind	Ariane Kalenberg, née Mayer	3350–3856	2020–2022
Natalie Alison	Rosalie Engel	703–1556; 1681–1688; 2055–2095; 2271–2282; 2324–2335; 3429–3857	2008–2012; 2013; 2014; 2015; 2015; 2020–2022
Matthias Zera	Henning Freiherr von Thalheim	3728–3890	2021–2022
Sophia Schiller	Constanze von Thalheim	3679–3899	2021–2022
Carl Bruchhäuser	Leon Thormann	3864–3954	2022
Joachim Lätsch	André Konopka	513–4022	2007–2023
Merve Çakır	Shirin Ceylan	3543–4025, 4061	2021–2023
Johannes Huth	Gerald „Gerry“ Ceylan, née Richter	3656–4025; 4043, 4048; 4184–4188, 4199	2021–2023 (2023); 2024
Jeannine Gaspár	Vanessa Sonnbichler	3369–4069	2020–2023
Katrin Anne Heß	Carolin Lamprecht	3814–4069	2022–2023
Stefan Hartmann	Maximilian „Max“ Richter	3501–4089; 4146–4148	2020–2023
Aylin Ravanyar	Valentina Saalfeld #3	3917–4107; 4247–4256	2022–2023; 2024
Tim Borys	Julian Specht	4046–4168	2023
Christopher Jan Busse	Noah Schwarzbach	3953–4172	2022–2023
Sabine Werner	Helene Richter	3862–4254	2022–2024
Milan Marcus	Tom Dammann	4186–4256	2024
Lukas Leibe	Theodor "Theo" Licht † (4314)	4082–4315; 4318, 4322, 4327, 4331, 4334	2023–2024
Dionne Wudu	Nicole Alves	4062–4333	2023–2024
Michael Baral	Luis Sommer	4277–4341	2024
Krista Birkner	Sophia Wagner	4338–4469, 4481	2024–2025
Daniela Kiefer	Alexandra Schwarzbach née Bamberg	3877–4473	2022–2025
Timo Ben Schöfer	Markus Schwarzbach	3890–4483	2022–2025
Vivien Wulf	Larissa Mahnke #1	4371–4485	2025
Erich Altenkopf	Dr. Michael Niederbühl	884–4501	2009–2025
Laura Osswald	Greta Bergmann	4013–4505	2023–2025
Pablo Sprungala	Miro Falk	4295–4505	2024–2025

=== Former recurring cast and guests ===
Actor	Character	Episodes	Duration
Andreas Seyferth	Prof. Meixner	35–46, 66	2005
Peter Fröhlich	Bruno Matysiak	63–73	2005–2006
Peter Zintner	Peter Mahler † (93)	32–35; 88–94	2005; 2006
Christian Rudolf	Andreas Wagner † (98)	6–36; 72–99	2005; 2006
Karyn von Ostholt	Inge Klinker-Emden #2	51–69; 101–117	2005–2006
Julia Haacke	Natalie Hoffmann	122–160	2006
Michael Jäger	Carsten Lorenz	134–135; 151–160	2006
Andreas Zimmermann	Sven Maiwald	181–194	2006
Bruni Löbel	Almuth Freifrau von Thalheim † (340)	200–214	2006
Michael Gahr	Pfr. Lehner	87–104; 182–183; 265–267; 286–313	2006–2007
Rudi Knauss	KK Schuster	301–313	2007
Hans Kraus	Oskar Schwarzenbeck	319–338; 362–371	2007
Robert Spitz	Andy Zacher (alias Bankräuber Merker) †	404–420	2007
Silvia Seidel	Rita von Schandorf	406–425	2007
Marian Lösch	Jonas Nebel #1	232–244; 287–292; 445–453	2006; 2006; 2007
Marianne Rappenglück	Berta Meyer	485–496	2007
Christoph Schobesberger	Prof. Dr. Sauer	482–501	2007
Aloysius Itoka	Joshua Obote † (571)	527–575	2008
Joachim Kretzer	Frank Decker	597–606	2008
Nils Brunkhorst	Philipp Kronleitner	567–636	2008
Olga Kolb	Kira Szepanski	676–677; 686–699	2008
Vanessa Jung	Karla Müller	761–781	2009
Daniel Schäfer	Fred Neumann † (793)	785–794	2009
Hans Heller	Herbert Sponheim	793–805	2009
Horst Janson	Dr. Paul Wielander † (834)	755–774; 831–835	2008–2009
Verena Zimmermann	Sonja Felder	789–794; 804–805; 835–850	2009
Werner Haindl	Karl Strobl	847–855; 913–914	2009
Marijam Agischewa	Susanne Bruckner	919–929	2009
Björn Grundies	Harald „Harry“ Lugauer	980–1017	2009–2010
Joachim Raaf	Dr. Löwenstein	125–142; 1019–1021	2006; 2010
Joseph M'Barek	Jimmy Engelhard	819–830; 1042–1045	2009; 2010
Steffen Nowak	Philipp Octoir	960–961, 969; 1102–1108	2009; 2010
Gerhard Acktun	Georg Rosenberg	1091–1110	2010
Isis Krüger	Astrid Ostermeyer	934–1117 (sporadische Auftritte)	2009–2010
Arthur Galiandin	Yordan Zerwenkow	384–409; 1121–1125	2007; 2010
Kathrin Claudia Rein	Isar Roth	1147–1156	2010
Matthias Beier	Alain Briand †	1144–1179	2010
Marie-Ernestine Worch	Maike Konopka, geb. Steenkamp	1111–1190	2010
Wolfgang Riehm	Jasper Steenkamp	1127–1137; 1186–1190	2010
Marion Mathoi	Jana Leinemann	1187–1205	2010
Olivia Pascal	Felicitas Strehle	1090–1110; 1217–1223	2010; 2010–2011
Angela Ascher	Sabrina „Chandana“ Wagner	1208–1235	2010–2011
Christiane Blumhoff	Cordula van Dering	721–737; 1240–1243	2008; 2011
Wolfgang Freundorfer	Franz Hochleitner	163–184; 283–298; 1251–1262	2006; 2006–2007; 2011
Patrick Wolff	Stephan Winter	1160–1170; 1276–1278	2010; 2011
Luise Deschauer	Käthe Hansen	1262–1325	2011
Sabine Bach	Jenny Fürstin von Liechtenberg, geb. Zimmermann	1330–1356	2011
Wolfgang Grindemann	Dr. Axel Brunner	322–323; 1105–1106; 1339–1360	2007; 2010; 2011
Daniela Kiefer	Dr. Nadja Löwenstein	1344–1349; 1365–1370	2011
Lea Marlen Woitack	Deborah „Debbie“ Williams	1344–1396	2011
Janusz Cichocki	Jenö Majoré	1398–1410; 1432–1435	2011
Sebastian Deyle	Maximilian ″Maxim″ Klinker-Emden	6–10, 24–28; 36–39, 49; 102–124; 177–246; 1429–1442	2005; 2005; 2006; 2006; 2011
Aviva Joel	Pilar Riedmüller †	1391–1392; 1483–1498	2011; 2012
Leander Lichti	Christian Weidenfels	1489–1504	2012
Mark-Alexander Solf	Jan Augustin	1507–1516	2012
Anna Lena Class	Lilly Schürmann	1516–1525, 1533	2012
Kerstin Gähte	Nicola Westphal † (1553)	1499–1555, 1576	2012
Jacques Breuer	Dr. Leopold Huber	1397–1412; 1563–1564	2011; 2012
Nina Schmieder	Kristin Nörtlinger	1517–1582	2012
Ralph Schicha	Hans Burger	1528–1552; 1590–1599	2012
Philipp Sonntag	Alois „Loisl“ Pachmeyer	405–1627 (sporadische Auftritte)	2007–2012
Andreas Renell	Prof. Dr. Kreutzkamm	806–814; 1630–1633	2009; 2012
Christoph Wettstein	Urs Grosswihler	890–892; 910–913; 984–987; 1332–1333; 1392–1395; 1450, 1635–1644	2009; 2009; 2009; 2011; 2011; 2012
Sylvia Mayer	Jennifer Martin	1479–1480; 1549–1550; 1624–1629, 1661	2012
Mirco Wallraf	Gonzalo Pastoriza	1689–1701	2013
Veronika-Marie von Quast	Roswitha „Rosi“ Zwick	511–1709 (sporadische Auftritte)	2007–2013
Janis Kilian Witting	Mike Bärmann	1706–1715	2013
Alfonso Losa	Thiago Hildebrandt	1717–1728	2013
Bernhard Bozian	Damian Zollinger	1735–1745	2013
Tobias Maehler	Dr. Markus Drescher	1750–1771	2013
Kerstin Gähte	Franziska Appelt	1757–1786	2013
Guido Broscheit	Veit Bergmann	1702–1730; 1809–1813	2013
Werner Opitz	Eberhard Schuster	1775–1780; 1802–1822	2013
Petra Berndt	Magdalena Murnau	1855–1915	2013–2014
Sepp Schauer	Gustl Moosburger	986–992; 1023–1033; 1307–1325, 1382; 1667–1671; 1900–1916	2009–2010; 2010; 2011; 2012; 2013–2014
Günter Bubbnik	Tobias Blume	1924–1936	2014
Florian Reiners	Christian ″Chris Brenner″ †	1945–1965	2014
Daniel Buder	Daniel Brückner	1896–2013	2013–2014
Timothy Peach	Dr. Andreas Erhardt	1412–1421; 2020–2036	2011; 2014
Lilian Naumann	Lilly (Sr. Helene) Hagendorf	2008–2053	2014
Samuel Koch	Tim Adler	2043–2075	2014
Jurij Rosstalnyj	Aljosha Semjonow	2080–2095; 2113–2125	2014
Philipp Weiche	Bert von Kramm	2126–2137	2014
Julia Dahmen	Leonora Lopez (alias Estefania Márquez) † (2169)	2154–2170	2015
Pierre Kiwitt	Ian McPherson	2161–2183	2015
Sarah Thonig	Rebecca „Becky“ McPherson	2173–2183	2015
Elinor Eidt	Larissa Weigelt	2191–2208	2015
Susu Padotzke	Dr. Christina Roth	2204–2213	2015
Nik Felice Aligbe	Stefan Merz	2244–2262	2015
Günter Barton	Hermann Stürzebecher †	2229–2269	2015
Holger Christian Gotha	Curd Heinemann	1066–1078; 1270–1291; 1372–1387; 1824–1849; 2271–2281	2010; 2011; 2011; 2013; 2015
Felix Maximilian	Samuel „Sam“ Eckmann	2285–2302	2015
Martina Schölzhorn	Alina Steffen † (2323)	2296–2326	2015
Agnes Decker	Saskia Schön	2344–2356	2015
Silke Franz	Hl. Aldagund „Alda“ von Lohenstein † (2015)	2335–2338; 2350–2361	2015
Wolfgang Schatz	Pfr. Dr. Josef Herold	2353–2362	2015
Florian Stadler	Patrick Auerbach	2362–2372	2015
Peter Nottmeier	Arwed Baron von Hasselrode	2363–2378	2015–2016
Kristina Dörfer	Alexandra Auerbach	2329–2397	2015–2016
Saskia Valencia	Nina Kowald	2439–2457	2016
Regina Fink	Anni Hoyer	2446–2470	2016
Angelika Bender	Else Schweitzer	2410–2412; 2467–2474	2016
Ina Meling	Isabelle Raspe	2421–2486	2016
Mika Ullritz	Paul Raspe	2422–2486; 2499–2500	2016
Viola Wedekind	Dr. Friederike Breuer	2479–2505	2016
Benjamin Bieber	Lucien Evers	2515–2528	2016
Rosetta Pedone	Pia Reiter † (2592)	2519–2532	2016
Pius Schmitt	Klaus Sperber	2561–2583	2016
Sacha Holzheimer	Saskia Hanke	2625–2634	2017
Beatrice Richter	Gerti Schönfeld	2627–2657	2017
Momi von Fintel	Volker Nüssle	2649–2666	2017
Maria Weidner	Anja Ransmayer	2669–2698	2017
Luca Zamperoni	Diego Alvarez (alias Alfredo Morales-Diaz)	2704–2715	2017
Simone Rethel-Heesters	Christine Münchberg	2716–2737	2017
Wilfried Klaus	Gottfried Saalfeld	2722–2737	2017
Christiane Bärwald	Naomi Krüger	2596–2603; 2737–2740	2016; 2017
Daniel Gawlowski	Oliver Müller	2787–2797	2017
Eugen Knecht	Wanja Semjonow	2829–2851	2017–2018
Iskander Madjitov	Alexander „Alejandro“ Becker	2858–2875	2018
Bastian von Bömches	Carsten Sperr (vorgeblich)	2883–2896	2018
Sidonie von Krosigk	Magda Mittermeier	2936–2977	2018
Matthias Brüggenolte	Jochen „Joe“ Möller	2073–2095; 2978–2992	2014; 2018
Doris Buchrucker	Anna Lindbergh #1	2916–2923; 3016–3017	2018
Anton Algrang	Henning Winter † (3024)	3005–3025	2018
Dominique Marquet	Madeleine Zellweger	2978–2982; 3030–3040	2018
Joachim Lätsch	Wolfgang Schwab	3053–3065	2018–2019
Jeroen Engelsman	Ragnar Sigurdson	3117–3140; 3156–3188	2019
Jens Nünemann	Elmar Lubowitsch	3197–3206	2019
Markus Ertelt	Dr. Hans-Peter Borg	3267–3293	2019
Bettina Redlich	Marianne Achleitner	3255–3267; 3299–3303	2019; 2020
Hans-Jürgen Silbermann	Walter Schweitzer #2	3303–3322	2020
Christian Buse	Pfr. Vinzenz Rimpel	2721–3329 (sporadische Auftritte)	2017–2020
Thomas Meierl	Handlanger Schulz	2748–3387 (sporadische Auftritte)	2017–2020
Sebastian Feicht	Urs Bauer	3392–3394; 3405–3412	2020
Barbro Viefhaus	Michelle Ostermann	3412–3460	2020
Paul Grabosch	Polospieler Leo (bis 3494)	3271–3291; 3313–3316; 3335+3337, 3346; 3447–3450; 3493–3495	2019–2020
Anton Grabosch	Polospieler Anton (bis 3495)	3271–3291; 3313–3316; 3335+3337, 3346; 3447–3450; 3493–3495	2019–2020
Michaela Stögbauer	Margit Krummbiegl	3223, 3266–3287; 3307–3308; 3511–3515	2019; 2020; 2020
Werner Biermeier	Hieronymus Ehrlinger	3043–3047; 3225–3229; 3245–3249; 3499–3505; 3533–3536	2018; 2019; 2019; 2020; 2021
Peter Lewys Preston	Joell Wauters	3477–3499; 3532–3563	2020; 2021
Antje Mairich	Leentje van Straaten	3473–3475; 3524–3578	2020; 2021
Ralf Komorr	Dr. Siegfried Kamml	3582–3603	2021
Robert Herrmanns	Georg Fichtl	3596–3614	2021
Florian Burgkart	Benjamin „Benni“ Holle	3611–3647	2021
Andreas Beckett	Dexter Torrence	2428–2434; 3707–3714	2016; 2021
Christoph Mory	Cornelius Freiherr von Thalheim (alias Lars Sternberg)	3554–3651; 3721–3724; 3747–3749	2021–2022
Stephan Käfer	Dr. Karl Kalenberg	3414–3437; 3458, 3461, 3477, 3481–3482, 3484, 3493; 3732–3746, 3772	2020–2022
Natalie Hünig	Bettina Schönefeld	3790–3806	2022
Christiane Blumhoff	Anna Lindbergh #2	3762–3768; 3803–3809	2022
Markus Walz	Kommissar Schallenberger	1875–3825	2013–2022
Jakob Graf	Raphael Kofler	3834–3857	2022
Michaela Weingartner	Merle Finow	3776–3822; 3848–3858	2022
Marie-Therese Futterknecht	Anja Fröbel	3860–3874	2022
Thorsten Nindel	Christian Krüger	3939–3946; 3963+3967; 3978–3980	2022–2023
Selina Weseloh	Veronika ″Vroni″ Schwarzbach † (4005)	3999–4006; 4010, 4142	2023
Genoveva Mayer	Ulrike Dremel, geb. Bluhm	3989–4012	2023
Eve Lamell	Gesine Winter	4004–4005, 4028; 4045–4051, 4067	2023
Belina Mohamed-Ali	Imani Kariki	4043–4089; 4146–4148	2023
Maurice Lattke	Otto von Arnsberg	4052–4107	2023
Birgit Koch	Wilma Johanna Baronin von Zweigen † (4199)	3683–3685; 4158–4200	2021; 2023–2024
Lily Lück	Zoe de Lavalle	4171–4206	2023–2024
Andreas Hagl	Caspar Weiss	4205–4228	2024
Johann Schuler	Günther Sonnbichler	3337–3347; 4033–4049; 4229–4255	2020; 2023; 2024

=== Celebrity guest performers ===
Actor	Character	Episodes	Duration
Patrick Lindner	Patrick Lindner	117–118	2006
Monica Lierhaus	Monica Winter	445–446	2007
Maria Riesch	Maria Riesch	666	2008
Ramona Leiß	Helga Hölzl	696–701	2008
Alfons Schuhbeck	Alfons Schuhbeck	722–723	2008
Florian Simbeck	Dr. Klein	863–865	2009
Thomas Gottschalk	Thomas Gottschalk	895	2009
Albert Fortell	Dr. Wolfgang Degen	1061–1067	2010
Nina Ruge	Nina Ruge	1154–1156	2010
Andreas Geremia	Andreas "Gerre" Geremia	1259–1262	2011
Bobby Schottkowski	Bobby Schottkowski	1259–1262	2011
Alexander Mazza	Viktor Sparmann	1435–1440	2011
Magdalena Neuner	Magdalena Neuner	1446–1449	2012
Leslie Mandoki	Leslie Mandoki	2105	2014
Jean-Marie Pfaff	Jean-Marie Pfaff	2368	2015

== Background ==
=== Format ===
Originally created as a telenovela with 100 episodes, Sturm der Liebe has been extended several times. The show has maintained the format of a telenovela in many aspects, while also having aspects of a traditional soap opera. Certain elements have always remained consistent: a new dream couple is introduced every season, there is a voiceover dubbed by a female lead to hear her inner thoughts, the dream couple falls in love, has obstacles that tear them apart, overcomes the obstacles to reunite and then marries before setting off for a new life out of Bichelheim.

=== Anniversaries ===
On 26 January 2010 was broadcast the episode 1000th The anniversary was telenovela script comes with a big party and fireworks to "250 years Fürstenhof implemented Following this episode was one of Sepp Schauer (Alfons Sonnbichler) and Judith Hildebrandt (Tanja Liebertz) moderated, 50 -minute "anniversary special storm of love – happiness and tears at the court." aired a special broadcast on ARD and ORF 2 On 23 March 2023, it aired its 4,000th episode

=== Filming ===
The Bavaria TV Production GmbH (until 31 January 2007: Bavaria Film GmbH) produces the series since the summer of 2005 in the studios of Bavaria Film in Green Forest in Munich. Per day of shooting creates a complete sequence (Length 48 minutes, episode 111–150: 43 minutes). Storm of Love is produced digitally: The external rotation, the images stored directly to disk, the interior rotation is recorded on a deck. The cameras are all connected directly by cable to the cut. Since episode 447 the series in widescreen format 16:9 is broadcast. ARD Degeto is responsible for editorial work, but also transfers it to the WDR and in part from the BR.

=== Outdoor locations ===
The exterior design for the fictional hotel "Fürstenhof" is a private castle in Upper Bavaria. The shooting is generally not accessible to the public.

On the site of Bavaria Film GmbH in Green Forest Geiselgasteig In addition, a villa in the Bavaria Film City (48°3′59″N 11°33′3″E). Since March 2006, filmed for the renovated West Wing the prince's court. For this, the facade of the Villa man was used in 2000 as a backdrop for the historical drama The Manns - Novel of a Century was built. Modeled after the original gate was renovated and rebuilt. This setting is played from the inside. In difficult weather conditions during the winter months because of the proximity to the studio, shot mostly here.

Between the scenes of the soap opera landscape studies are recorded, which are adapted to the seasonal flow. The recordings are from the foothills of the Alps. Between these scenes alternate and separate the individual scenes in the plot.

In episode 1193 to 1195 have Robert Saalfeld (Lorenzo Patané), Eva Krendlinger (Uta Kargel), Hildegard Sonnbichler (Antje Hagen) and husband Alfonso (Sepp Schauer) three days in Verona, northern Italy spent. The German actor spoke in the scenes in German and their Italian colleagues Selene Gandini, Fabio Mazzari and Enrico Mutti responded in their language. In the latter post-production were dubbed.

=== Directing ===
Always five episodes will be produced in a block of five days. On each block work two directors who is a responsible for studio shooting, the other for the parallel emerging field recording.

=== Music ===
Each pair of protagonists in Storm of Love has a common love song that unites them.

- In the first season at Laura and Alexander, this was "Bridge Over Troubled Water" by Simon & Garfunkel.
- Alexander's rival with Laura Gregory had the song "Stand by Me" by Ben E. King.
- In the second season, which intensively studied with the love life of Robert and Miriam, was the song of the two "Your Song" by Elton John. During the season Miriam was married to Felix Tarrasch. Their common song was "Total Eclipse of the Heart" in the sung version of Glee.
- The love song from the third season with Greg and Samia was "I Will Always Love You" by Whitney Houston, which is already on the soundtrack for the film The Bodyguard was used.
- The love story of Emma and Felix was accompanied with the song "Moon River" by Barbra Streisand.
- Sandra and Luke, the pair connects the fifth season, the song "Without You" by Harry Nilsson.
- The love song of the lovers Eva and Robert, "When You Say Nothing at All" by Ronan Keating.
- Theresa and Moritz: Billy Joel – "Honesty"
- Theresa and Konstantin: Billy Joel – "Just the Way You Are"
- Marlene and Konstantin: Elvis Presley – "Can't Help Falling in Love"
- Pauline and Leonard: Lee Hazlewood and Nancy Sinatra – "Summer Wine"
- Julia and Niklas: Debby Boone – "You Light Up My Life"
- Luisa and Sebastian: Elvis Presley – "Always on My Mind"
- Clara and Adrian: Robbie Williams – "Angels"
- Ella and William: Wet Wet Wet – "Love Is All Around"
- Rebecca and William: Ain't No Sunshine by Bill Withers
- Alicia and Viktor: With or Without You, both the original by U2 and the cover version by the choir Scala & Kolacny Brothers.
- Denise and Joshua: Eternal Flame, an in-house production was used.
- Denise and Henry: Perfect by Ed Sheeran
- Franzi and Tim: Right Here Waiting by Richard Marx
- Franzi and Steffen: Take My Breath Away from Berlin
- Maja and Florian: Stay by Hurts
- Josie and Paul: Run by Leona Lewis
- Josie and Leon: Someone You Loved by Lewis Capaldi
- Eleni and Leander: A Million Dreams by P!nk
- Eleni and Julian: Until I Found You by Stephen Sanchez and Em Beihold
- Ana and Philipp: A Thousand Years by Christina Perri
- Ana and Vincent: Falling by Harry Styles

=== Audience share and audience reach ===
In the first six months, the market share steadily to over 20 percent at most about 3 million viewers. The target audience of 14- to 49-year-olds regularly reaches an audience of over 10 percent [28] But there were episodes with much longer range.

"Regularly seek the ARD Telenovela" Sturm der Liebe "market shares of more than 25 percent of the public for three years from – the place in the top 5 of the Public Service program is the production of the Bavaria Film therefore safe."

– Quote meters Some standard internal records [edit] 26 September 2005: Episode 1: It reached 1.04 million viewers, an audience rating of 10.3%. 3. April 2006: Episode 121: The audience rises to over 25%. 6. August 2007: Episode 432: The most successful and September 2009, following 3.03 million viewers, a market share of 32.0%. 1. February 2008: Episode 544: 3.21 million viewers with an audience share of 25.1%, 11.5% of the young target group 14. September 2009: Episode 914: The most successful result with 3.28 million viewers, a market share of 27.9% 26. January 2010: 1000 Episode: The anniversary saw 3.13 million viewers, which is a market share of 24.1%. The special storm of love – happiness and tears at the court saw 2.2 million viewers, market share 15.2%. The best value in its third season was 29.7 percent market share. 3.44 million viewers, the range record set in season two there were only 3.95 million viewers, the peak labelled .

=== Repetition and transmission blocks ===
The episodes are broadcast on a fixed channel position of the ARD. All third party programs repeat the series in the morning program on the following day. In addition, there is a repeat in the night. As part of the internet in the last episodes of ARD library will be available. For the curious, there are on the web site of the ARD a synopsis and a cast list for four weeks in advance. The hr-TV, the first episodes of the telenovela was repeated. But decided the third programs (according to own data) to repeat only new episodes, since storm of love alone is a trademark of ARD.

ORF has bought the serial rights and repeated the following morning on each ORF2.

=== Pocket folders ===
In January 2007, published monthly in the pocket guide series Publisher Cora storm of love. Here are written by Johanna Theden of the scripts be rejected novels. As the title pictures stills from the TV series are used.

As of July 2006 saw the storm of love – photo story. The first volume came as a photo book, the romantic love story of Laura and Alexander to be reprinted. The second edition was issued in August 2008, and showed the stars of the series in exciting scenes. Are complemented by background information on the novels series. The series is published once a year. The author remains anonymous.

== Prizes and awards ==
- 2010: German TV Award 2010 in the category Best daily series.
- 2009: On Fantag Sepp Schauer received the Fan Award (from 50,000 votes) on the grounds of Bavaria.
- 2008: Premio Napoli Classic for Cultural and Martin Gruber Susan Hoecke as Victoria and Felix Tarrasch.
- 2007: Premio Napoli Cultural Classic for Lorenzo Patané as Robert Saalfeld.
- 2007: Smoke-free seal for storm of love because of the deliberate decision on smoking characters.

== International broadcast ==
Storm of Love has been licensed to 20 stations worldwide, and rights to all episodes were given to RTVS (Slovakia), LTV1 (Latvia), TV 3 (Lithuania), TV3 (Estonia) and Rete 4 (Italy). Rete 4 broadcasts the series under the name Tempesta d'amore. Nova TV in Bulgaria has broadcast the series since the end of July 2009 under a title translating as "Winds of Love." VTM3 in Belgium broadcasts under the title Sturm der liebe. Polish channel TV Puls broadcasts it under the title Burza uczuć, Finnish channel Sub under the title Lemmen viemää, and Icelandic channel RÚV under the title Ástareldur (Fire of Love). In France, the series was broadcast from episode 1392 (season 7) since 2 April 2013 on France 2 with the name of "Le Tourbillon de l'Amour" and in Austria, the series was broadcast from episode 166 onwards since mid-July 2006 on ORF 2. A summary of episodes 1 to 165 was broadcast as a pilot.

Country	Channel
Germany	Das Erste
Slovakia	STV
Czech Republic	TV Barrandov
Latvia	LTV1
Lithuania	TV3
Estonia	TV3
Bulgaria	Nova TV / bTV
Italy	Rete 4
Belgium	VTM Gold / VTM3
Poland	TV Puls
Finland	MTV Ava / MTV3
Iceland	RÚV
France	France 2 / France 4
Austria	ORF 2
Switzerland	SRF zwei
Albania	Vizion Plus
Canada	TLN (TV channel)
