= Dietrich Adam =

German actor (1953–2020)

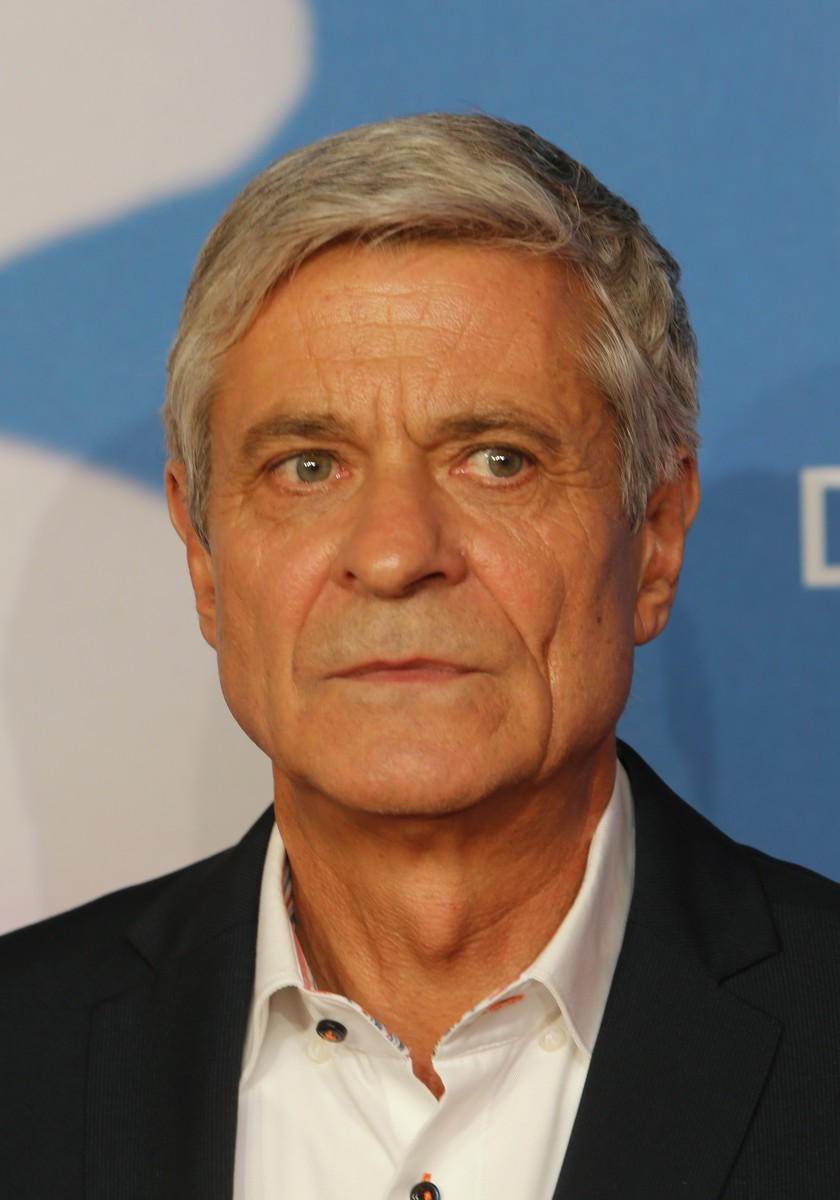
Adam in 2015

Dietrich Adam (16 October 1953 – 2 November 2020) was a German actor.

== Career ==
He is best remembered for playing the hotelier Friedrich Stahl in the series Storm of Love between 2013 and 2017, and for his role in the renowned German police series Tatort.

Adam was born in Göttingen. He also made appearances in the television series Inga Lindström and Tonio & Julia. He died in Berlin, aged 67.
