= Timothy Peach =

British / German actor (born 1963)

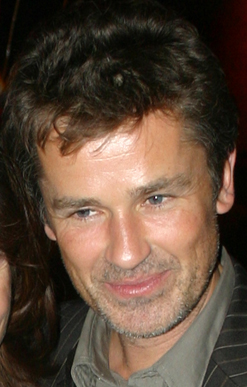
- Timothy Peach in 2006
- Born: 25 July 1963 (age 62); Munich, Germany
- Occupation: Actor
- Years active: 1986-present
- Spouse: Nicola Tiggeler (m. 1988)
- Children: 2

Timothy Peach (born 25 July 1963) is a British / German actor. He appeared in more than seventy films since 1986.

== Filmography ==
Film
Year	Title	Role	Notes
1991	Keep on Running	Michael	
2001	Geregelte Verhältnisse	Freddie	
2001	Resurrection	Freddie	TV film
2001	Der blaue Vogel	Oliver Jensen	TV film
2003	Luther	Karl von Miltitz	
2013	Ricky - normal war gestern	Wichtigtuer	
2014	To Life!	Galerist	

TV series
Year	Title	Role	Notes
2011-2014	Storm of Love	Dr. Andreas Erhardt	11 episodes
2014	Rote Rosen	Jan Mertens	210 episodes
