= Uta Kargel =

German actress

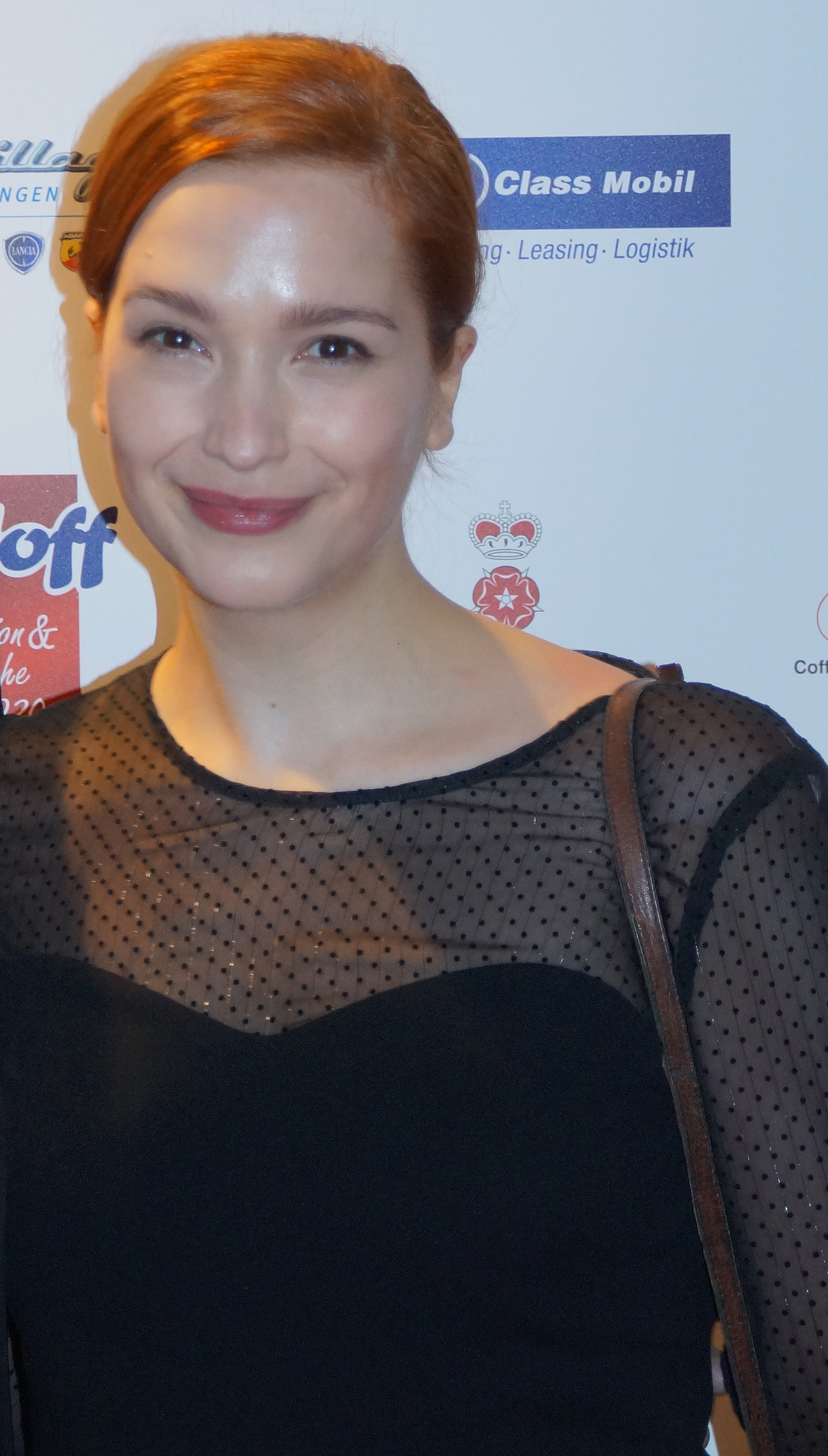
- Uta Kargel in 2016
- Born: 28 May 1981 (age 43); Halle (Saale), Saxony-Anhalt, GDR
- Occupation(s): Model, Actress, Voice Actress
- Years active: 1998–present

Uta Kargel (born 28 May 1981 in Halle (Saale)) is a German Playboy model, actress, and voice actress

== Career and personal life ==
Uta Kargel was born in Halle (Saale) in the former GDR and later moved to East Berlin with her family. She started modelling at the age of 18. After school she first finished her job training as a bookseller. At the same time she started acting in the stage group Grüner Hund that she had cofounded in 2002.

On television Kargel had her breakthrough with the role as Lena Bachmann in the German soap opera Gute Zeiten, schlechte Zeiten, where she appeared in 487 episodes until she left in 2006. Kargel started studying culturology., which she paused for two years when she got a leading role in the soap opera Storm of Love. After 2011 Kargel worked in the patient's library of the Charité and as a school aide at a primary school, while she finished her studies with a master's degree. With a few of her friends the founded BiK Pictures, an independent film company, which produced its first feature film Kartenhaus with Kargel in one of the leading roles in 2017 with the help of crowdfunding. After returning to Storm of Love for just seven episodes in 2017, her role became continuous, when she returned again in March 2018. In episode 3381 (May 2020) Kargel left Storm of Love again after a total of 808 episodes. As a voice actress, Kargel dubs roles voiced by Bai Ling.

In 2017 Kargel survived a heavy car crash on a road trip from Denver to Los Angeles without any injuries.

In August 2019 Kargel and the Italian photographer Nicoló Lanfranchi posted a series of photos on Instagram, which revealed, that they were in a relationship. Kargel still lives and works in Germany, while Lanfranchi lives in Italy. Kargel has one sister.

Kargel became known to a broader public, when she posed for the November 2019 issue of the German edition of Playboy.

== Film ==
Year	Title	Director
1998	Hamlet – Eine Reise durch die Metropole	Ilona Zarypow
2003	Wedding Daydream (short film)	Ansgar Ahlers
2003	Die Allee (documentary)	Ilona Zarypow
2006	Sunny Hill	Luzius Rüedi
2006	Die Liebe der Lieblosen	Benjamin Tholen
2008	Der Morgen danach (short film)	Robert Lyons
2015	Idyllik (short film)	Jurij Neumann
2016	Twice (short film)	Sharon On
2017	Glücklich (short film)	Jurij Neumann
2017	Kartenhaus	Jurij Neumann

== Television ==
Year	Title	Notes
2006-2006	Gute Zeiten, schlechte Zeiten	
2006	Verliebt in Berlin	single episode
2007	R. I. S. – Die Sprache der Toten	season 2, episode 4
2008	Volles Haus	leading role
2008	Ein starkes Team	
2008	Dr. Molly & Karl	leading role in one episode
2009	Kill Your Darling	web series
2009	Ein starkes Team	
2010-2011	Storm of Love	leading role in episodes 1087-1391
2011	Rote Rosen	episodes 1271-1290
2012	Loona Balloona	short film, leading role
2014	Heldt	single episode
2016	Stuttgart Homicide	single episode
2017	Storm of Love	episodes 2791-2797
2018-2020	Storm of Love	episodes 2886-3381

== Stage ==
Year	Title	Written by
1998	Hamlet	William Shakespeare
2003	Die Küche	Arnold Wesker
2003	Elizaveta Bam	Daniil Kharms
2003	Eine absurde Tischrunde	Daniil Kharms
2003	Die Reise nach Brasilien	Daniil Kharms
2003	Publikumsbeschimpfung	Peter Handke
2004	Zirkus Sardam	Daniil Kharms
2004	Goldene Herzen	Daniil Kharms
2005	Schiller, Schiller	Friedrich von Schiller
2006	Roter Schnee – oder wir sind keine Heringe	Daniil Kharms
2006	Die Frau vom Meer	Henrik Ibsen
2019	Kasimir und Kaukasus	Francis Veber
