= Tigelaar =

Tigelaar is a Dutch surname. Notable people with the surname include:

- Ineke Tigelaar (born 1945), Dutch swimmer
- Liz Tigelaar (born 1975), American writer
