= Nicola Tiggeler =

German actress

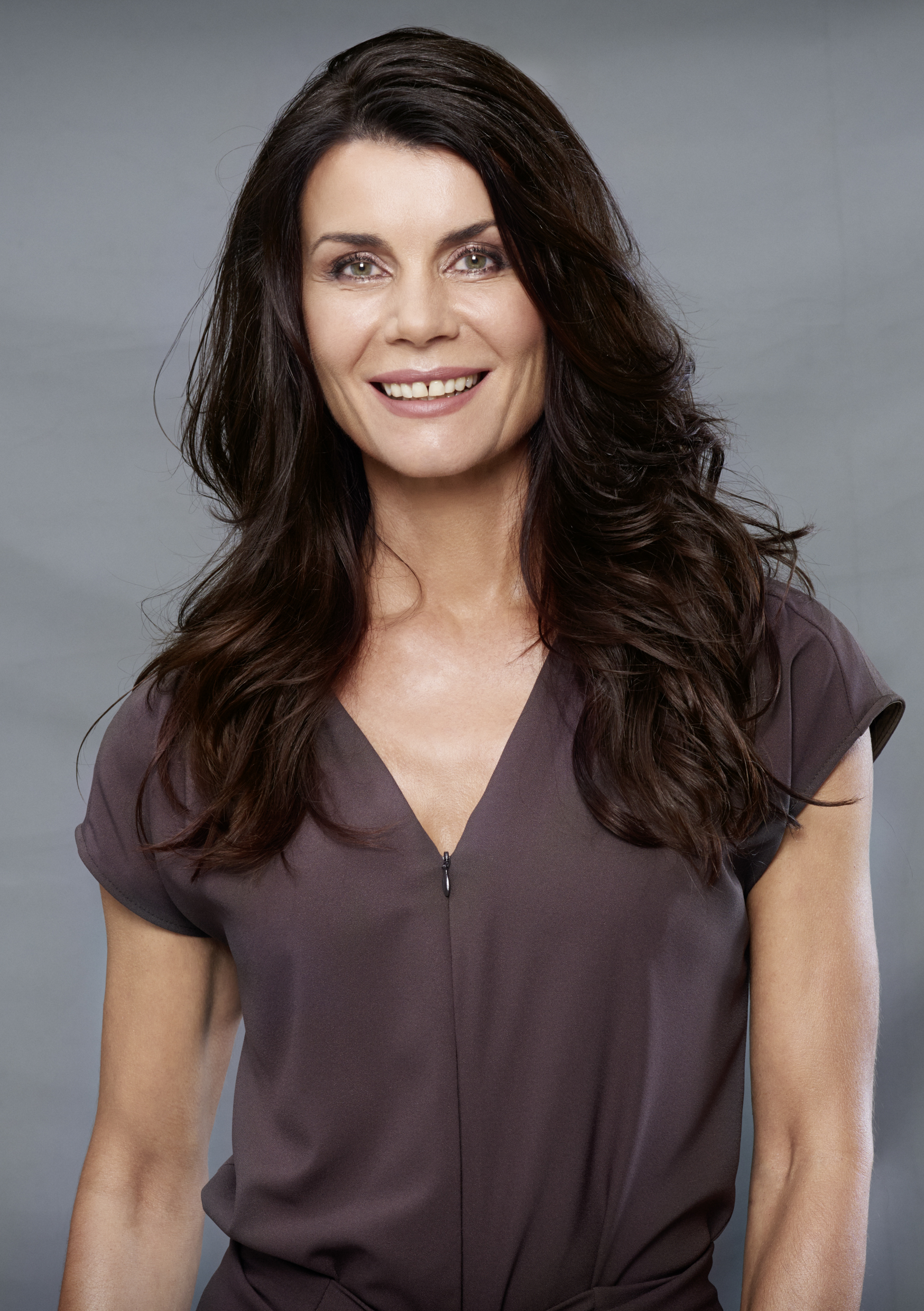
- Nicola Tiggeler in 2017
- Born: 1 April 1960 (age 65); Hanover, Germany
- Occupation: Actress
- Spouse: Timothy Peach (m. 1988)
- Children: 2

Nicola Tiggeler (born 1 April 1960 in Hanover) is a German actress, singer, dancer and acting teacher.

== Personal life ==
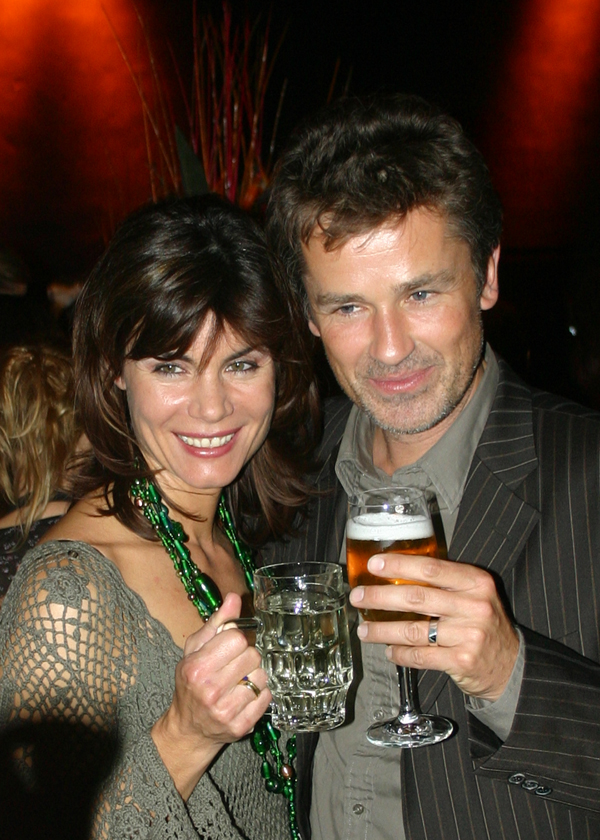
Tiggeler (left) with her husband Timothy Peach in 2006

During her theater engagement in Augsburg, Tiggeler met the fellow actor Timothy Peach, with whom she has been married since 1988. Both are also ambassadors of the SOS Children's Village e.V. Tiggeler and Peach live in Munich and have two children.
