= Liz Baffoe =

Ghanaian-German actress

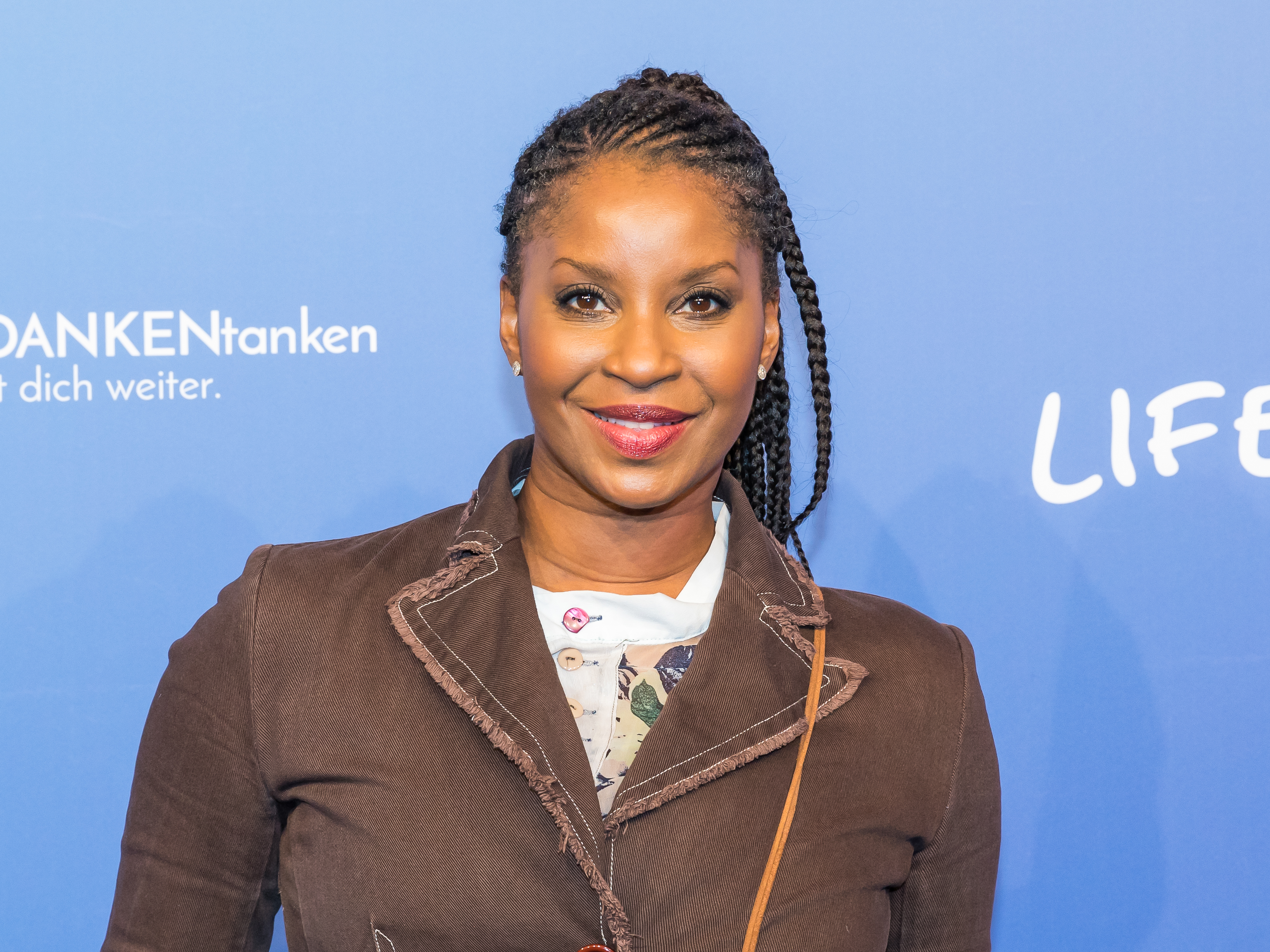
- Baffoe in 2018
- Born: 6 July 1969 (age 57); Bad Godesberg, Bonn, West Germany
- Education: Herbert Berghof Studio
- Occupation: Actress
- Years active: 1995–
- Known for: Lindenstraße
- Relatives: Anthony Baffoe (brother)

Liz Baffoe (born 6 July 1969) is a Ghanaian-German born actress. She is the younger sister of former Ghanaian international footballer Anthony Baffoe who is now the Deputy General Secretary for CAF.

== Early life and education ==
Baffoe was born as the youngest daughter of a Ghanaian diplomat and grew up in the diplomatic quarter in Bonn-Bad Godesberg. Her brother is former Ghanaian footballer, football administrator and pundit Anthony Baffoe and actress Rosalind Baffoe is her sister. After graduating from high school in 1992, she trained as a media designer. From 1996 to 1999 she attended the drama school of the Theater der Keller in Cologne and in 2001 the Herbert Berghof Studio in New York.

== Career ==
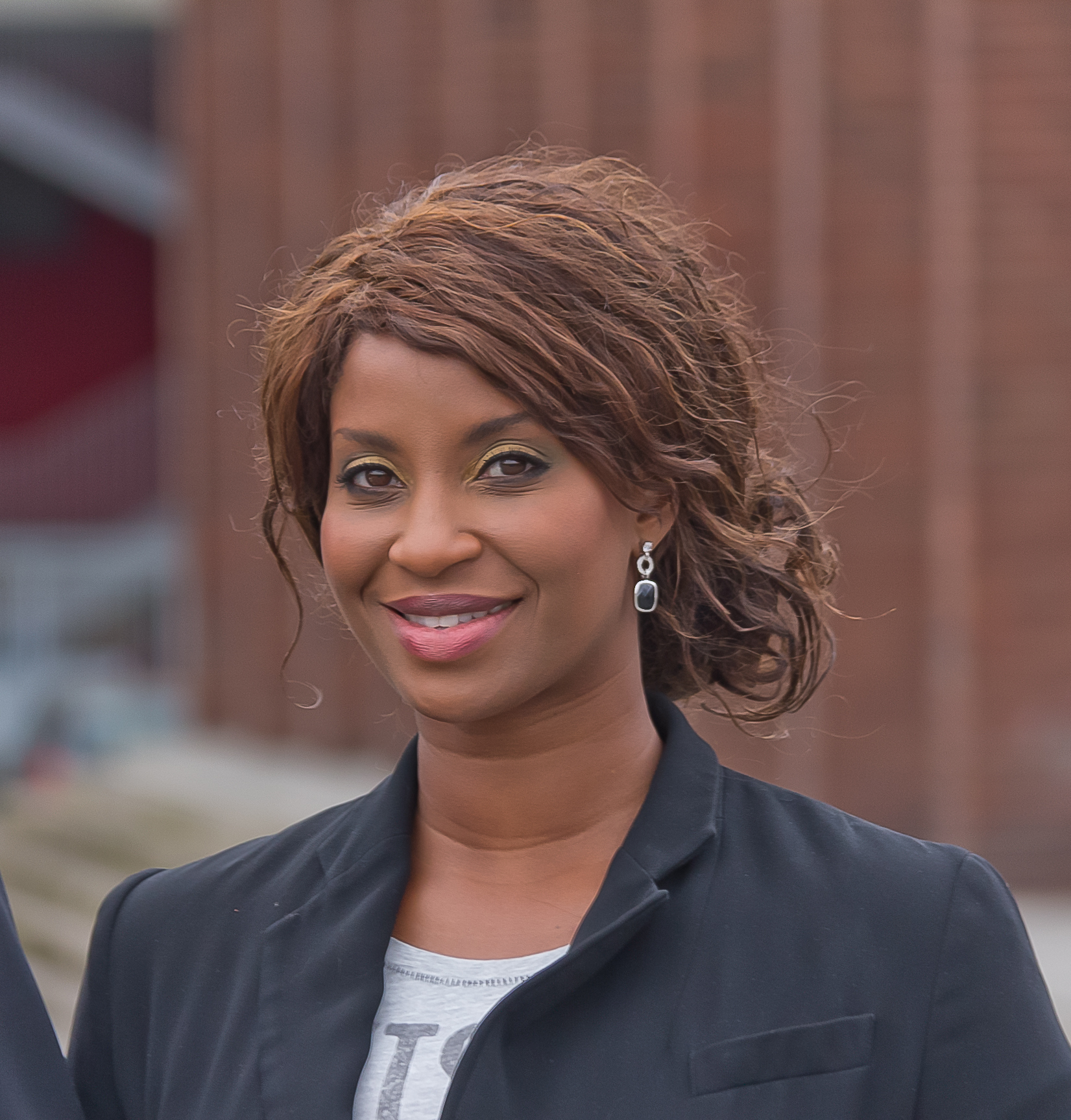
Baffoe in 2012

Baffoe played the role of the Nigerian Mary in the television series Lindenstrasse from episode 518, broadcast on 5 November 1995, to episode 1112 of 25 March 2007. She has also played supporting roles in some German television series and films. Her long-term role in Lindenstrasse in particular gave the impression that Baffoe only spoke broken German, which, however, did not correspond to reality.

Baffoe sings in a soul band and from 1992, she was a background singer in the Rudi Carrell show Let yourself be surprised for two years

In October 2006 she took part in the RTL show Dancing on Ice together with Hendryk Schamberger . Since September 2007 she has been in front of the camera in the role of the teacher Changa Miesbach for the tenth season of Schloss Einstein . She also played the kiosk operator Hadiya Wedekind in the series Die Anrheiner from 2008 to 2013.

She also plays this role in the follow-up series Ein Fall für die Anrheiner (from 2011), with Hadiya Wedekind now working as a press photographer. On 27 January 2013, she was candidate in the VOX telecast Perfect Celebrity Dinner. Since December 2013, Baffoe has been represented by the management agency ONEeins Management from Odenthal.

Baffoe supports the Respekt! No place for racism. Since 2013, Baffoe has been the patron of Gye Nyame Kids eV. The association supports orphans and half-orphans as well as single mothers in Ghana. In August 2014, Baffoe took part in the Sat.1 show Promi Big Brother and came in 9th place.

On 1 September 2015, Baffoe opened the fashion label Atinka Ashenso together with the entrepreneur Alexander Leon Diaz. Since 6 April 2018, Liz Baffoe has been selling her own jewellery collection on the channel QVC .

Since 2021, Liz Baffoe is ambassador of WW. Since November 2021, Baffoe has been part of the guessing team of the SWR television program Ich trage einen großen Namen and since March 2022, she has been part of the guessing team of the SWR television program Sag die Wahrheit.

== Personal life ==
Baffoe married Jens Krieger on 1 June 2012. She lived with her family in a small town near Kaiserslautern in the Palatinate, but in 2014 she moved back to Cologne. In the spring of 2015, Baffoe separated from her husband.

== Filmography (selected) ==
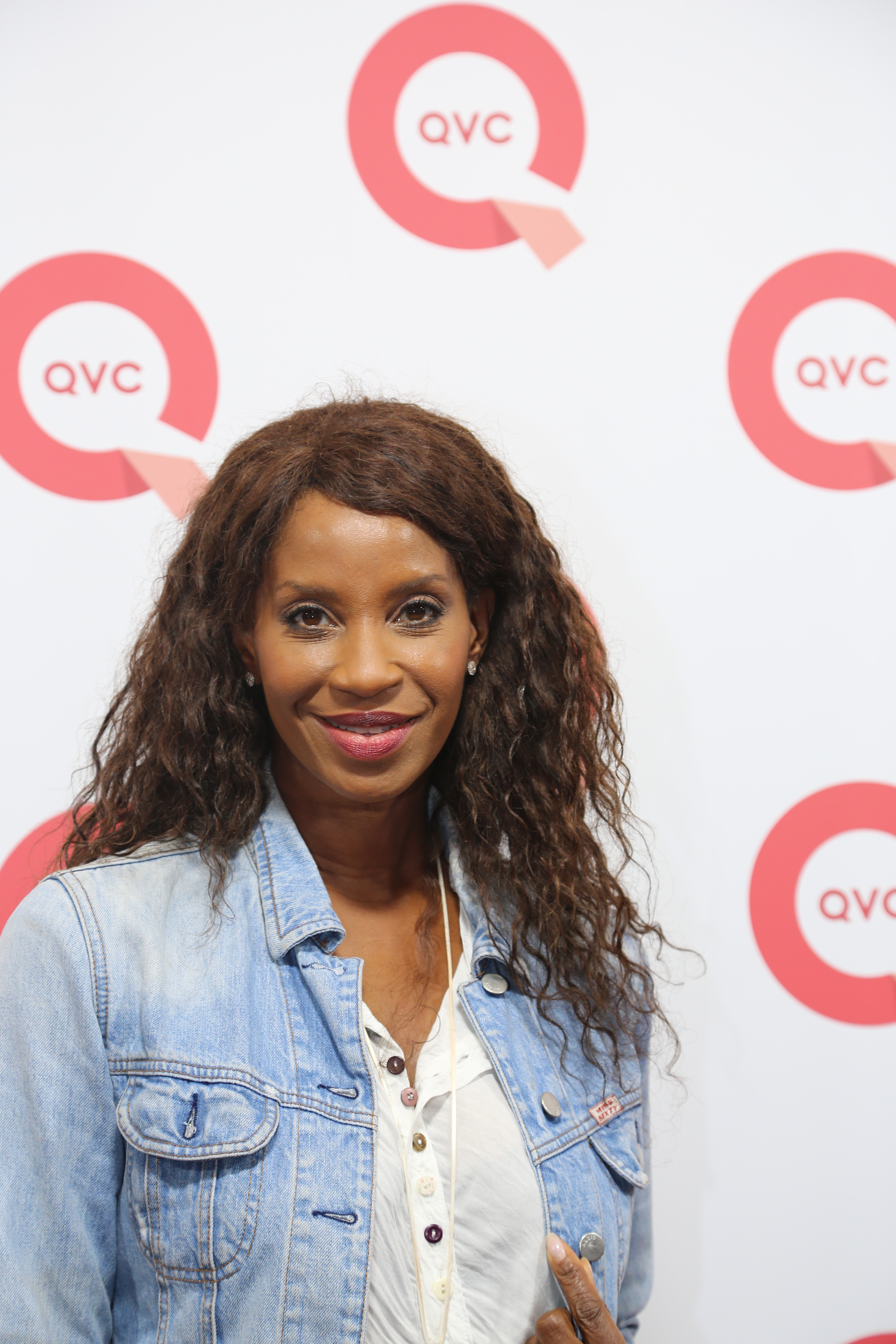
Liz Baffoe - QVC

- 1995–2007: Lindenstraße
- 1999: Der Fahnder
- 2000: Die Manns – Ein Jahrhundertroman
- 2001: Tatort – Bestien
- 2002: Problemzone Mann
- 2003: Im Namen des Gesetzes
- 2008–: Schloss Einstein
- 2008–2011: Die Anrheiner
- 2009: In aller Freundschaft
- 2011–2014: Ein Fall für die Anrheiner
- 2011: Nachtschicht – Reise in den Tod
- 2012: Verbotene Liebe
- 2012: Geisterfahrer
- 2016: Kreuzfahrt ins Glück
- 2018: Die Füchsin – Spur in die Vergangenheit
- 2019: Nachtschicht – Cash & Carry (Krimireihe)
