= Novaspace =

German Eurodance band

- Origin: Berlin, Germany
- Genres: Eurodance, Eurotrance
- Years active: 2002–2011
- Labels: Konsum
- Past members: Felix Gauder; Jenny Marsala; Jessica Boehrs

Novaspace was a German Eurodance project originated in 2002 by the record producer Felix Gauder, featuring Jessica Boehrs as the singer, who was later replaced by Jenny Marsala. Between 2002 and 2004, Novaspace achieved international success with covers of the 1980s hits, such as "Time After Time", "Guardian Angel" and "Beds Are Burning", particularly in German-speaking countries.

== History ==
Novaspace was formed in 2002, when Jessica Boehrs met Stuttgart's dance producer Felix Gauder. The duo would release all their singles and albums through Gauder's Konsum Records. Their first single, a cover version of Cyndi Lauper's 1984 hit "Time After Time", was released in the first half of 2002 reached the top 10 on the German and Austrian singles charts. It also peaked at no. 15 in Australia and the following year, was a top 40 hit in the UK. Their second single was "To France", a cover version of Mike Oldfield's 1984 hit, but it only achieved moderately success, peaking within the top 40 in Germany, Austria and the Netherlands. At the end of the year, the duo released a cover of Drafi Deutscher's 1983 hit single "Guardian Angel". The ballad was a departure from their previous up-tempo singles and became another top 10 success on the German singles chart. In January 2003, Novaspace released their first album, Supernova, which reached no. 28 in Germany and no. 39 in Austria. The band released one more single off their debut album, this time an original song "Paradise", co-written by Gauder, which only managed to reach no. 48 in Germany and no. 41 in Austria. Later in 2003, Novaspace released a new single, a cover version of Bryan Adams' 1984 song "Run to You", which was a moderate success, peaking at no. 38 in both Germany and Austria.

In early 2004, the duo's cover of Midnight Oil's 1988 hit "Beds Are Burning" became one of their highest-charting hits, peaking at no. 7 in Germany and no. 2 in Austria. It promoted their second album, Cubes, which reached no. 27 in Germany and no. 24 in Austria. The third single released from the album, a cover of The Police's "So Lonely", peaked at no. 15 on the German singles chart but was another top 10 hit in Austria. It was followed by a version of Ultravox's hit single "Dancing with Tears in My Eyes" which was more successful, placing at no. 11 and no. 6 in Germany and Austria, respectively.

In 2006, Novaspace released their third album called DJ Edition which was a collection of their previous singles in a reworked format, including one new track called "Send Me an Angel" (cover version of Real Life's hit song). It also featured a DVD containing music videos to all the previous singles. The album, which managed to peak only at no. 68 in Germany, saw the release of only one single, a cover of Cyndi Lauper's hit "All Through the Night", de facto a redone version of a track previously featured on Cubes. The single only peaked at no. 50 in Germany and failed to enter the charts elsewhere. Boehrs left Novaspace in the same year, and in December 2006, started playing in the German television program Schloss Einstein.

In 2008, Jenny Marsala joined Novaspace replacing Boehrs as the lead singer, and the band added 'Next Generation' to their moniker. Their new single "Dancing into Danger" was a cover of a 1987 song originally written by Michael Cretu for the German duo Inker & Hamilton, and only managed to peak at 79. in Germany. The second single with Marsala, another remake of "Time After Time", was released in May 2009. The next single was a cover of Climie Fisher's 1987 single "Love Changes (Everything)", released later in 2009, followed in 2010 by "Close Your Eyes", co-written by Gauder. None of those releases made any impact on the charts. In 2011, the duo released another single, an original song "Don't Look Back", but it wasn't commercially successful either and in the same year Novaspace disbanded. Singer Jenny Marsala went on to release German pop songs and achieved international success with her viral YouTube video 1 Girl 13 Voices in which she imitates voices of famous female singers.

== Discography ==
=== Albums ===
Year	Title	Peak positions	
Year	Title	GER	AUT
2003	Supernova	28	39
2004	Cubes	27	24
2006	DJ Edition	68	—

=== Singles ===
Year	Title	Peak positions							Album
Year	Title	GER	AUT	SWI	NLD	UK	IRE	AUS	Album
2002	"Time After Time"	6	7	67	28	29	42	15	Supernova
2002	"To France"	27	23	83	40	—	—	—	Supernova
2002	"Guardian Angel"	9	11	—	—	—	—	—	Supernova
2003	"Dancing with Tears in My Eyes"	11	6	98	83	—	—	—	Supernova
2003	"Paradise"	48	41	—	—	—	—	—	Supernova
2003	"Run to You"	38	38	—	—	—	—	—	Cubes
2004	"Beds Are Burning"	7	2	42	—	—	—	—	Cubes
2004	"So Lonely"	15	10	87	—	—	—	—	Cubes
2006	"All Through the Night"	50	—	—	—	—	—	—	DJ Edition
2009	"Dancing into Danger"	79	—	—	—	—	—	—	—N/a
2009	"Time After Time Rebirth"	—	—	—	—	—	—	—	—N/a
2009	"Love Changes Everything"	—	—	—	—	—	—	—	—N/a
2010	"Close Your Eyes"	—	—	—	—	—	—	—	—N/a
2011	"Don't Look Back"	—	—	—	—	—	—	—	—N/a
2012	"On the Radio"	—	—	—	—	—	—	—	

- 2025: Love Is Like An Ocean
- 2025: Sundancer
