= Jessica Boehrs =

German singer and actress (born 1980)

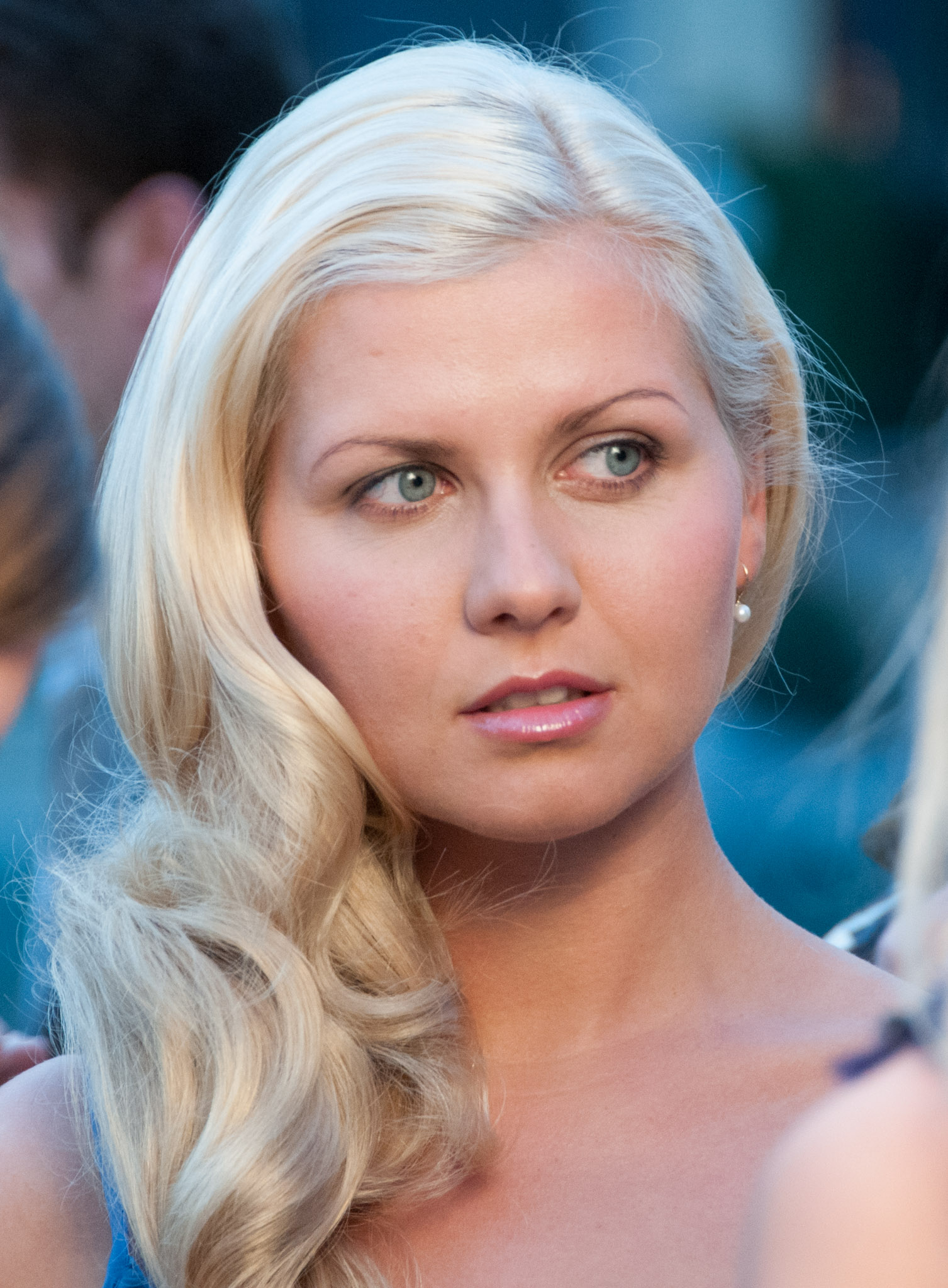
- Boehrs during the filming of Cruise to Happiness in Las Vegas, 12 November 2009
- Born: 5 March 1980 (age 46); Magdeburg, East Germany (now Magdeburg, Germany)
- Occupations: Singer; actress
- Years active: 1995–present
- Spouse: Marcus Grüsser (m. 2010; div. 2015)
- Children: 1

Jessica Boehrs (born 5 March 1980) is a German actress and singer. She is best known as the singer of the Eurodance project Novaspace between 2002 and 2006, and for her role in the 2004 American comedy film EuroTrip.

== Career ==
Boehrs started appearing in various German TV productions in her early to mid-teens, most notably in the 1995 television film Die Kreuzfahrt. The following year, she started her singing career in the band JessVaness. Their only release was the 1997 single "Bla Bla Bla" on ZYX Music which wasn't a commercial success. Boehrs was a background singer for the boy band Caught in the Act and the hip-hop trio Tic Tac Toe. She then made guest appearances in such TV series as Die Rote Meile, SOKO München and Marienhof.

In 2002, Boehrs became the singer of the Eurodance musical duo Novaspace. They achieved international success with dance covers of the 1980s songs "Time After Time", "Guardian Angel" and "Beds Are Burning", among others, particularly in German-speaking countries. During her five years in Novaspace, she released three albums and scored five international top 10 hits. In 2004, Boehrs appeared in the American sex comedy EuroTrip as Mieke, the object of the main character's European vacation quest.

Between 2006 and 2007, she played Nina in the German television program Schloss Einstein on KiKa and appeared in the comedy series Zack! Comedy nach Maß on Sat.1. From March to October 2008, she played the role of Jana in over 100 episodes of the soap opera Sturm der Liebe (Storm of Love). In 2010, Boehrs made her first appearance in the series Kreuzfahrt ins Glück, where she would play the recurring character Andrea. In 2012, she appeared in one episode of the telenovela Anna und die Liebe. In the following years, Boehrs occasionally played small roles in various TV series, such as SOKO Stuttgart (2018) and Familie Dr. Kleist (2019).

== Personal life ==
Boehrs lives in Munich and Potsdam, and married actor Marcus Grüsser in July 2010. The couple divorced in March 2015. Her son was born in September 2015.

== Filmography ==
=== Films ===
Year	Title	Role	Notes
1995	Die Kreuzfahrt	Katja	TV film
1998	Julia – Kämpfe für deine Träume!	Melanie Knaupp	TV film
1999	Unschuldige Biester	Lisa Streckmann	TV film
2004	EuroTrip	Mieke	
2005	Peace, Love & Bikinis!	Herself	documentary
2006	One Way	Bartender	
2006	They Know	Lacy	
2008	Ein Ferienhaus auf Ibiza	Anja	TV film
2018	Phantomschmerz	Julia	

=== TV series ===
Year	Title	Role	Notes
1999	The Red Mile	Nadine	1 episode
2000	SOKO 5113	Lena Ries	1 episode: "Eine Nummer zu groß"
2002	Mary Court	Melanie Neuhaus	1 episode
2002	The Bull of Tölz	Birgit Hauser	1 episode: "Lover Couple Murderer" ('"Liebespaarmörder")
2006	A love on Lake Garda	Isabella Hofer	21 episodes
2006	Rosamunde Pilcher	Marian Simmons	1 episode: "The Love of Her Life" ("Die Liebe ihres Lebens")
2006	The Family Lawyer	Biggi	1 episode: "Ramba Zamba"
2006–07	Einstein Castle	Nina	44 episodes
2007	Zack! Comedy Made to Measure	Various characters	
2008	Storm of Love	Jana Schneider	
2008	In the Valley of Wild Roses	Cindy Kaloon	Season 3, episode 3: "Peak of Love" ("Gipfel der Liebe")
2009	Hallo Robbie!	Marion Schöller	Season 8, episode 8: "Robbie has Pig" ("Robbie hat Schwein")
2010–15	Cruise to Happiness	Andrea Herbst / Manuela Müller	7 episodes
2012	Anna and Love	Petra	1 episode: "Clinical Dead" ("Klinisch tot")
2015	Cheerful to Deadly: Hubert and Staller	Petra	1 episode: "Clinical Dead" ("Klinisch tot")
2017	Dr. Klein	Anna	1 episode
2018	SOKO Stuttgart	Anni / Conny	1 episode: "Strange Voices" ("Fremde Stimmen")
2019	Beck Is Back!	Marie Schmickler	1 episode: "Final Destination" ("Endstation")
2019	Family Dr. Kleist	Sabine Ellerbrock	1 episode: "For This Moment" ("Für diesen Augenblick")

== Discography ==
=== Albums ===
- 2003: Supernova
- 2004: Cubes
- 2006: DJ Edition

=== Singles ===
- 1997: "Bla Bla Bla"
- 2002: "Time After Time"
- 2002: "To France"
- 2002: "Guardian Angel"
- 2003: "Dancing with Tears in My Eyes"
- 2003: "Paradise"
- 2003: "Run to You"
- 2004: "Beds Are Burning"
- 2004: "So Lonely"
- 2006: "All Through the Night"
