= List of Dutch Top 40 number-one singles of 1987 =

These hits topped the Dutch Top 40 in 1987.

Issue Date	Song	Artist(s)	Reference
3 January	"Walk Like an Egyptian"	The Bangles	
10 January	"Walk Like an Egyptian"	The Bangles	
17 January	"Showing Out (Get Fresh at the Weekend)"	Mel and Kim	
24 January	"Showing Out (Get Fresh at the Weekend)"	Mel and Kim	
31 January	"Showing Out (Get Fresh at the Weekend)"	Mel and Kim	
7 February	"Showing Out (Get Fresh at the Weekend)"	Mel and Kim	
14 February	"Reet Petite"	Jackie Wilson	
21 February	"Reet Petite"	Jackie Wilson	
28 February	"I Knew You Were Waiting (For Me)"	Aretha Franklin & George Michael	
7 March	"I Knew You Were Waiting (For Me)"	Aretha Franklin & George Michael	
14 March	"I Knew You Were Waiting (For Me)"	Aretha Franklin & George Michael	
21 March	"Respectable"	Mel and Kim	
28 March	"Respectable"	Mel and Kim	
4 April	"Respectable"	Mel and Kim	
11 April	"Sailin' Home"	Piet Veerman	
18 April	"Sailin' Home"	Piet Veerman	
25 April	"Sailin' Home"	Piet Veerman	
2 May	"Sailin' Home"	Piet Veerman	
9 May	"Crockett's Theme"	Jan Hammer	
16 May	"Crockett's Theme"	Jan Hammer	
23 May	"Crockett's Theme"	Jan Hammer	
30 May	"Crockett's Theme"	Jan Hammer	
6 June	"You Want Love (Maria, Maria...)"	Mixed Emotions	
13 June	"You Want Love (Maria, Maria...)"	Mixed Emotions	
20 June	"I Wanna Dance with Somebody (Who Loves Me)"	Whitney Houston	
27 June	"I Wanna Dance with Somebody (Who Loves Me)"	Whitney Houston	
4 July	"I Wanna Dance with Somebody (Who Loves Me)"	Whitney Houston	
11 July	"I Want Your Sex"	George Michael	
18 July	"I Want Your Sex"	George Michael	
25 July	"I Want Your Sex"	George Michael	
1 August	"Who's That Girl"	Madonna	
8 August	"Who's That Girl"	Madonna	
15 August	"Who's That Girl"	Madonna	
22 August	"Who's That Girl"	Madonna	
29 August	"I Just Can't Stop Loving You"	Michael Jackson & Siedah Garrett	
5 September	"I Just Can't Stop Loving You"	Michael Jackson & Siedah Garrett	
12 September	"I Just Can't Stop Loving You"	Michael Jackson & Siedah Garrett	
19 September	"I Just Can't Stop Loving You"	Michael Jackson & Siedah Garrett	
26 September	"Wishing Well"	Terence Trent D'Arby	
3 October	"Bad"	Michael Jackson	
10 October	"Never Gonna Give You Up"	Rick Astley	
17 October	"Never Gonna Give You Up"	Rick Astley	
24 October	"Never Gonna Give You Up"	Rick Astley	
31 October	"Never Gonna Give You Up"	Rick Astley	
7 November	"Pump Up The Volume"	M|A|R|R|S	
14 November	"Faith"	George Michael	
21 November	"Faith"	George Michael	
28 November	"Faith"	George Michael	
5 December	"Faith"	George Michael	
12 December	"Faith"	George Michael	
19 December	"Faith"	George Michael	
26 December	"My Baby Just Cares for Me"	Nina Simone	

== See also ==
- 1987 in music
