= Silver Bird (Tina Rainford song) =

1976 song by Tina Rainford

Single by Tina Rainford

from the album Silver Bird
- B-side: "I'm Danny's Girlfriend"
- Released: 22 October 1976
- Recorded: 1976
- Genre: Pop
- Length: 3:36
- Label: CBS Records
- Songwriter: Renate Vaplus
- Producer: Eddy Bachinger

Tina Rainford singles chronology
"Das War Der Schönste Tag" (1976)	"Silver Bird" (1976)	"Fly Away Pretty Flamingo" (1977)

"Silver Bird" is a song by Tina Rainford, the title track of her 1976 LP. It was recorded in both German and English, with both renditions becoming hits in multiple nations.

The German version became a hit in central Europe during the fall of 1976, reaching number five in Germany and Austria. The song did best in Switzerland, where it reached number two.

The English version was a hit in Australia, where it reached number 30 in 1977. It also reached the Country charts of the U.S. (#25) and Canada (#28) in mid-1977.

== Chart history ==
=== Weekly charts ===
Chart (1976–77)	Peak position
Australia (Kent Music Report)	30
Austria	5
Canada RPM Country	28
Germany	5
Switzerland	2
U.S. Billboard Country	25

=== Year-end charts ===
Chart (1976)	Rank
Switzerland	8

== Cover versions ==
"Silver Bird" was covered by American actress and singer Audrey Landers in 1988. It is a track on her Have A Heart LP.
