= Florian Wünsche =

German actor (born 1991)

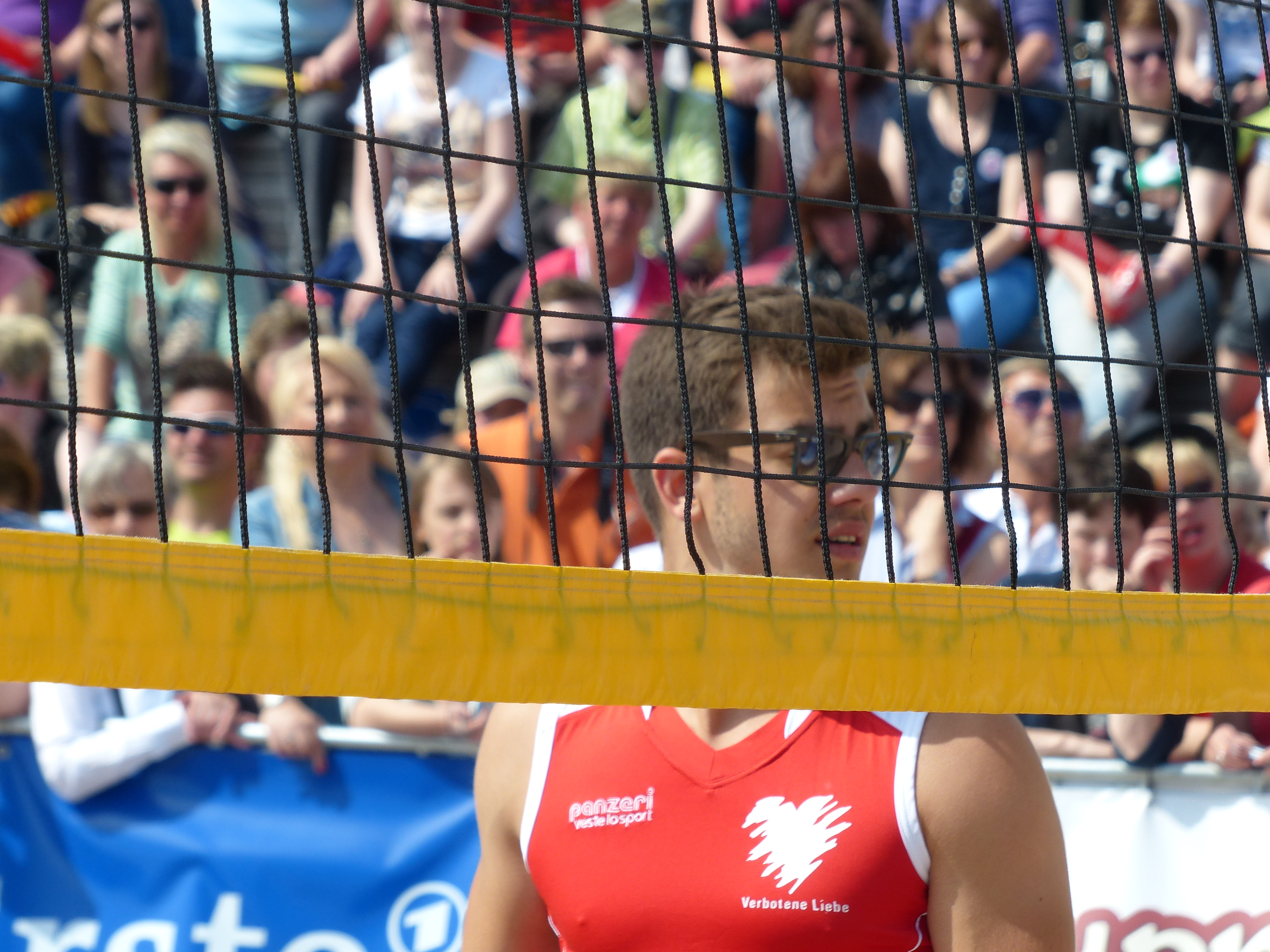
- Wünsche in 2013
- Born: Florian Wünsche; 18 July 1991 (age 33); Erfurt, Thuringia, Germany
- Occupation: Actor
- Years active: 2003–present

Florian Wünsche (born 18 July 1991) is a German actor and well known for his role as Manuel Siewert in the children soap opera Schloss Einstein.

He had his first small role in the feature movie Wer küsst schon einen Leguan? in 2003. This was followed by guest parts in two episodes of Ein Engel für alle and his first appearance in KRIMI.DE. After that he took the role of boarding school student Manuel Siewert in the popular teen soap Schloss Einstein in 2008. Wünsche lasted three seasons on the show, leaving Schloss Einstein in 2010. He then took part in the second season of the Coming of age-series dasbloghaus.tv, before having another guest appearance in KRIMI.DE.

In March 2011, Wünsche was cast as Emilio Sanchez in the soap opera Verbotene Liebe (Forbidden Love). He completed the show's Mallorca cast and later joined the cast in Düsseldorf Germany. His first appearance was on 28 June 2011. After the show's cancellation in 2015 Florian Wünsche joined the cast of Stuttgart Homicide. In his role as Benedikt Förster he's part of the forensic team being a young coroner who has to deal with his male co-worker's jealousy as well as with his ex-girlfriend who tries to keep his daughter from him by allowing him to see her on tough conditions.

He played the title role in Nicos Weg, a German-learning video series produced by Deutsche Welle and released in 2017.
