= Christopher Evans-Ironside =

English-German songwriter, composer, and music producer (1940–2022)

- Also known as: Overdrive
- Born: 10 May 1940; Melksham, Wiltshire, England
- Origin: Wiltshire
- Died: 3 June 2022 (aged 82) Hamburg, Germany
- Genres: Soundtracks, Pop music, Progressive rock
- Occupations: Keyboardist, arranger and composer.
- Instruments: Piano, Keyboards
- Years active: fl. ca. 1974–2022
- Labels: EMI Electrola, WEA
- Website: Ironside Music

Christopher Evans-Ironside (10 May 1940 – 3 June 2022) was an English and German songwriter, composer, and music producer. Born in England and based in Hamburg, Germany, his awards included Gold and Platinum discs for collaborations with Nino de Angelo and Drafi Deutscher as Mixed Emotions and Masquerade.

In the early 1980s Evans-Ironside produced three progressive rock albums, the first two as a duo with singer David Hanselmann, Stonehenge and Symbols", and the third as a solo project, Empty Spaces, in addition collaborating with Michael Chambosse on a concept album, The Timemachine.

Evans-Ironside was a prolific soundtrack composer for film, television and theatre, with work including Die Rättin and Just Messing About, and music for ballet productions by the Görlitz Theatre.
