= Daniel Kovac =

German-Slovenian singer

- Birth name: Daniel Kovač
- Born: 27 September 1956 (age 68); Črna na Koroškem, PR Slovenia, FPR Yugoslavia
- Genres: Pop
- Occupation: Singer
- Website: Daniel Kovac Band

Daniel Kovac (Slovene: Kovač; born 27 September 1956) is a German-Slovenian singer, best known for his participation in the Eurovision Song Contest 1990.

Kovac moved to Germany with his family in 1968, and started working as a session singer in the late 1970s. In the 1980s, he became a presenter for the Munich-based television music channel musicbox, at the same time hosting radio shows for Bayerischer Rundfunk. Kovac met Ralph Siegel through his studio work, and in 1990 was offered the chance by Siegel to perform a song in the German Eurovision selection. The song, "Frei zu leben" (Free to Live) was a duet with Chris Kempers, and won the selection by a convincing margin. "Frei zu leben" went forward to the 35th Eurovision Song Contest which took place on 5 May in Zagreb, where it placed ninth of 22 entries.

Kovac subsequently worked as a presenter for music channel VH1. He remains musically active, leading his own band.

Preceded by Nino de Angelo with Flieger	Germany in the Eurovision Song Contest; 1990 (with Chris Kempers)	Succeeded by Atlantis 2000 with Dieser Traum darf niemals sterben
