= Tina Rainford =

German singer (1946–2024)

Tina Rainford (born Christa Zalewski; 25 December 1946 – 23 February 2024) was a German singer from Berlin. She was a friend of Drafi Deutscher from school days onwards, and the wife of Peter Rainford until 1971.

Her musical career began in 1963 under the pseudonym of Peggy Peters, helped by Drafi Deutscher who wrote and produced her hits. Assuming her real name in 1967, she recorded several duets with her husband Peter.

After her divorce she united with Drafi Deutscher again, who wrote songs for her under the pseudonym Renate Vaplus, produced them under his real name, and acted as a supporting act on her 1976–1978 tours as Jack Goldbird. They also performed a duet song Alaska in 1972 as Tina & Drafi.

Rainford's greatest success came in 1976 with the issuance of her song, "Silver Bird". It became a significant hit, charting internationally in two languages. The English version was a Country & Western hit in the U.S. and Canada, as well as a Pop hit in Australia, peaking at #30. The German version became especially popular in central Europe. The follow-up single Fly Away Pretty Flamingo also became a big hit in German-speaking Europe. Both hits were written and produced by Drafi Deutscher.

Rainford was active as late as 2016, recording an LP with Anna Lena, When Ladys meet. She died on 23 February 2024, at the age of 77.
