= Kreuzfahrt ins Glück =

German television series

- Country of origin: Germany

Cruise to Happiness (in German: Kreuzfahrt ins Glück) is a German television series. It is a Das Traumschiff spin-off that follows two wedding planners and the couple that hired them. They are all traveling on the Dream Ship cruise ship where the couple is about to get married and spend their honeymoon visiting places, where they dock.

== Main casts ==
- Eva-Maria Grein von Friedl: Marie Andresen
- Patrik Fichte: Daniel Bergmann
- Marcus Grüsser: Stefan Herbst
- Jessica Boehrs: Andrea Herbst
- Grit Boettcher: Friedericke Herbst
- Amy Mußul: Laura Russo
- Jan Hartmann: Thomas „Tom“ Cramer
- Caroline Frier: Betty Vogt
- Daniele Rizzo: Simon

== See also ==
- List of German television series
