= Anthony Baffoe =

Ghanaian footballer

Personal information
- Date of birth: 25 May 1965 (age 61)
- Place of birth: Bad Godesberg, West Germany (now Germany)
- Height: 1.91 m (6 ft 3 in)
- Position: Defender

Team information
- Current team: Ghana (business manager)

Youth career
- 1974–1980: 1. FC Ringsdorff Godesberg
- 1980–1983: 1. FC Köln

Senior career*
Years	Team	Apps	(Gls)
1983–1985	1. FC Köln	2	(0)
1985–1986	Rot-Weiß Oberhausen	33	(2)
1986–1987	Stuttgarter Kickers	19	(1)
1987–1989	Fortuna Köln	73	(12)
1989–1992	Fortuna Düsseldorf	72	(4)
1992–1994	Metz	60	(0)
1994–1995	Nice	7	(0)
1997–1998	Hong Kong Golden	8	(0)
1998–1999	Caracas FC	8	(0)
1999–2001	Obuasi Goldfields	44	(1)

International career
1991–1994	Ghana	25	(1)
- * Club domestic league appearances and goals

Anthony Baffoe (born 25 May 1965) is a football business manager and former player who is the Deputy General Secretary of the Confederation of African Football. He played as a defender. As the son of a Ghanaian diplomat, Baffoe was born and raised near to the former West German capital of Bonn and made a name for himself in the 1980s in the Bundesliga, becoming a real crowd favourite for 1. FC Köln and Fortuna Düsseldorf. He represented the Ghana national team at international level.

== Club career ==
Baffoe was born in Bad Godesberg, Bonn, West Germany. Much-travelled, he played for clubs on four different continents. He spent the majority of his career in the Bundesliga and 2. Bundesliga, starting in 1983 at 1. FC Köln at 18 years of age before moving across the border to join French side FC Metz nearly ten years later. Baffoe was one of the first recognized black players to appear in the Bundesliga. After 74 German top flight appearances for Köln and Fortuna Düsseldorf he played for a further seven clubs, including spells in Hong Kong and Caracas.

== International career ==
Baffoe was the first Ghanaian expatriate player to play for the Ghana national team. He was capped 25 times for the Black Stars, notably at 1992 and 1994 African Cup of Nations.

== Retirement ==
After his playing career Baffoe used his popularity to set up and front a new TV magazine show devoted to youth football. He was successful on German television in various sport programmes and is the regular host of Viasat One's Uefa Champions League show in Ghana. After a few years, the former defensive utility man evolved into a well-known representative of the African continent and his home country of Ghana.

== Managerial career ==
Currently Baffoe is the Deputy Secretary General for Football & Development for (CAF). He previously served on FIFA and CAF Football Committees. He was also involved in organizing CAF and FIFA sanctioned tournaments. In February 2006 he was named "Director for International Relations" for the Ghana national team. He is the founder and General Secretary of the Professional Footballers Association of Ghana. In that capacity is in close contact with the FIFPro Players' association and works in collaboration with the Ghana Football Association.

Baffoe is a FIFA Ambassador for campaign against racism, a FIFA ambassador for SOS Children's Village and an ambassador for Play Soccer Ghana.

== Personal life ==
Baffoe is married to Kalsoume Sinare, a Ghanaian actress and they both have three children, Shaquille, Boukeem and Keisheira. Baffoe is the brother of German actress Liz Baffoe, who is famous for her role in the German TV series Lindenstraße.
