= Chris Kempers =

German singer

- Birth name: Christiane Kempers
- Born: 7 January 1965 (age 60)
- Origin: Mönchengladbach, West Germany
- Genres: Pop, Schlager
- Occupation: Singer

Chris Kempers (born Christiane Kempers on 7 January 1965) is a German singer, best known for her participation in the 1990 Eurovision Song Contest.

Kempers took part in the German Eurovision selection in 1988 as a member of group Rendezvous with "Du bist ein Stern für mich", which only managed tenth place. In early 1990, she appeared on a television programme imitating Jennifer Rush, and was noticed by Ralph Siegel, who offered her the opportunity to perform one of his songs as a duet with Slovenian singer Daniel Kovac in the 1990 Eurovision selection, which was held on 29 March in Munich. Kempers and Kovac went on to win the selection with the song, entitled "Frei zu leben" ("Free to Live"). Although the victory was by a considerable margin, it was unexpected, as not only had the song itself been seen by many as somewhat trite, but it was also considered by many viewers that Kovac had given a shaky vocal performance. "Frei zu leben" went forward to the 35th Eurovision Song Contest which took place on 5 May in Zagreb, where it placed ninth of 22 entries.

Following her Eurovision appearance, Kempers appeared in several stage musicals and worked briefly as a studio backing singer, but was unable to make a career breakthrough, and retired from the music industry soon thereafter.

Preceded by Nino de Angelo with Flieger	Germany in the Eurovision Song Contest; 1990 (with Daniel Kovac)	Succeeded by Atlantis 2000 with Dieser Traum darf niemals sterben
