= Die Anrheiner =

German television soap opera

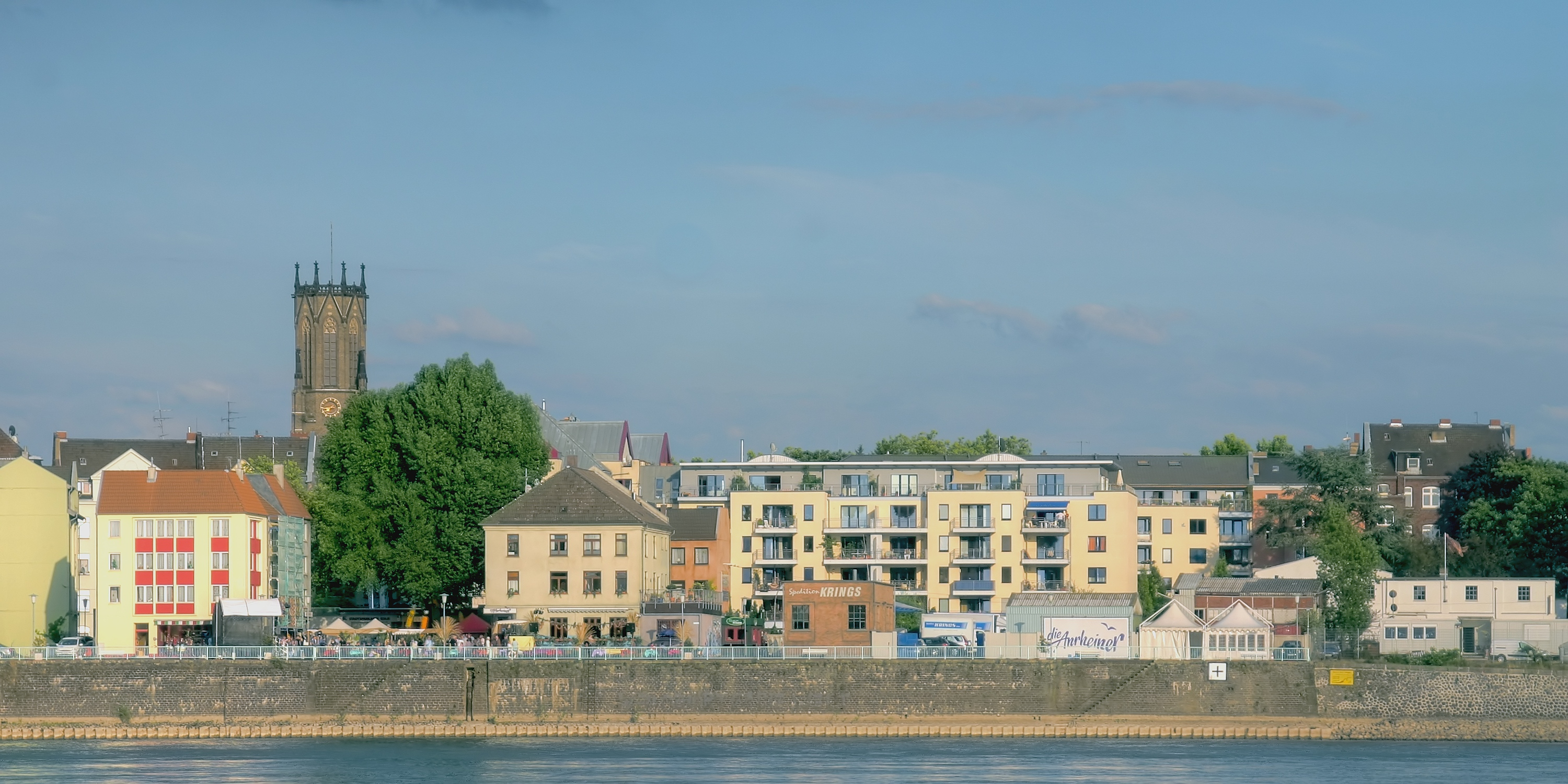
- Film area of the Anrheiner, Cologne-Mülheim
- Country of origin: Germany

Die Anrheiner is a German television soap opera series, broadcast on WDR-TV from March 21, 1998 to 2011. The series is set and filmed in Cologne.

== See also ==
- Ein Fall für die Anrheiner (2011 – 2014)
- List of German television series
