= Nino de Angelo =

German singer (born 1963)

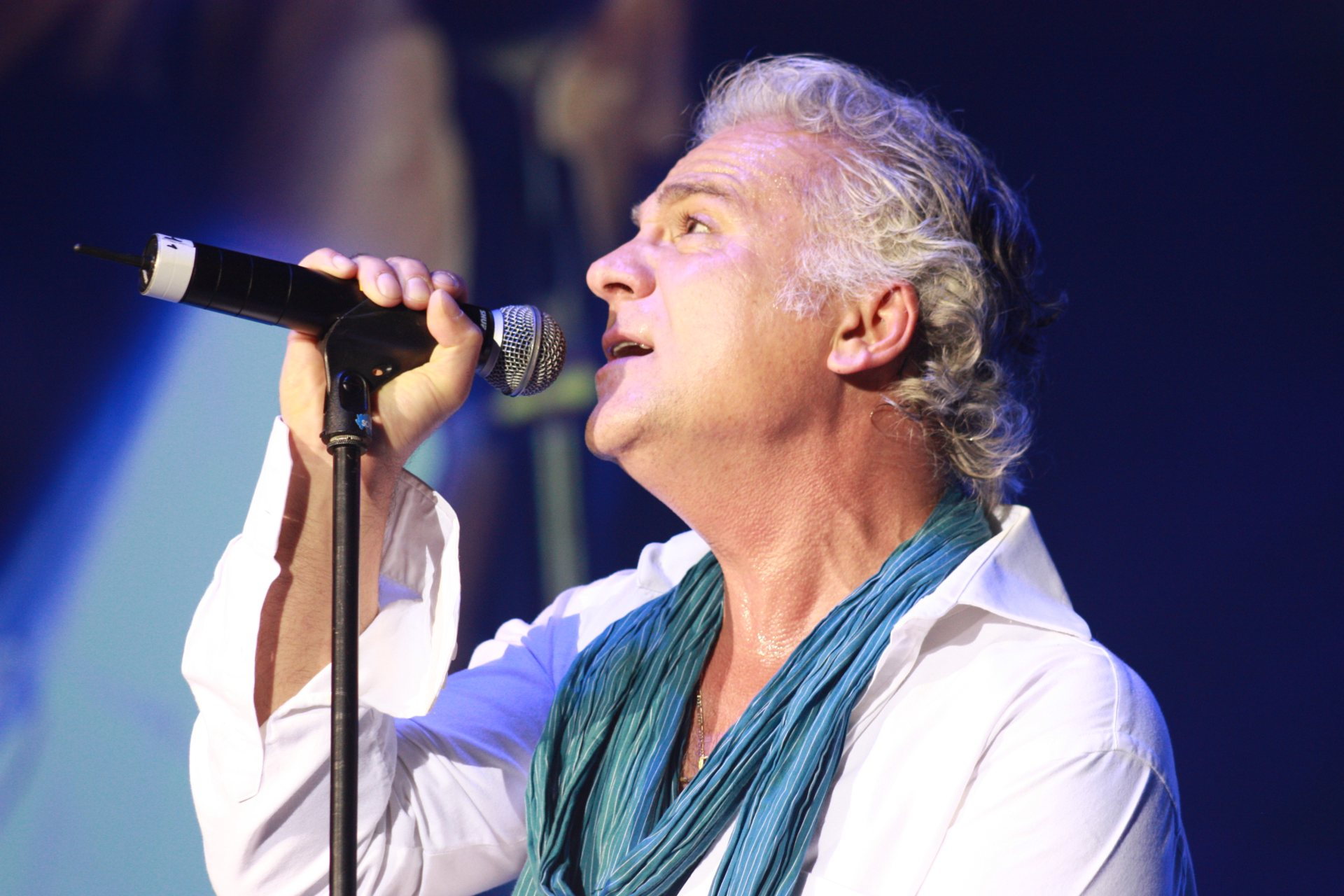
- Nino de Angelo in 2010

Background information
- Born: Domenico Gerhard Gorgoglione; 18 December 1963 (age 62); Karlsruhe, West Germany
- Years active: 1982–present

Domenico Gerhard Gorgoglione (born 18 December 1963), known professionally as Nino de Angelo, is a German singer. He is best known for his 1983 chart-topper "Jenseits von Eden", and he participated in the Eurovision Song Contest 1989 with the song "Flieger", written by Dieter Bohlen and Joachim Horn-Bernges.

== Early life ==
De Angelo was born in Karlsruhe in 1963, the son of Italian parents from Apulia. After his parents divorced, he moved with his mother to Cologne. He served his 15-month-long compulsory military service in the Army, in the 53rd Homeland Defence Brigade.

== Career ==
He has a minor hit in 1984 in the UK Singles Chart with "Guardian Angel". Originally the song was recorded in German and written by Drafi Deutscher. Titled "Jenseits von Eden", it remained number one for ten weeks on the German chart in 1983, while an Italian version was number one in France for five weeks. He collaborated with German band Mr. President, performing a song called "Olympic Dreams" from their "We See the Same Sun" album. He participated in Eurovision Song Contest in 1989 with the song "Flieger", performed 21st in the night and finished 14th with 46 points. German punk band Die Ärzte covered the song "Jenseits Von Eden" on their self-titled album, released in 1986.

== Discography ==
=== Albums ===
- 1983: Junges Blut
- 1984: Jenseits Von Eden
- 1984: Nino
- 1984: Zeit Für Rebelle
- 1985: Time To Recover
- 1986: Ich suche nach Liebe
- 1987: Durch tausend Feuer
- 1988: Baby Jane
- 1989: Flieger
- 1989: Samuraj
- 1991: De Angelo
- 1993: Verfluchte Zeiten
- 2000: Schwindelfrei
- 2002: Solange man liebt
- 2003: Zurück nach vorn
- 2004: Un Momento Italiano
- 2005: Nino
- 2012: Das Leben ist schön
- 2014: Meisterwerke – Lieder meines Lebens
- 2017: Liebe für immer
- 2021: Gesegnet & verflucht
- 2023: Von Ewigkeit zu Ewigkeit
- 2025: Irgendwann im Leben
- 2026: Vivi la vita

=== Singles (selected) ===
- 1983: "Jenseits von Eden"
- 1984: "Atemlos" / "Gar Nicht Mehr"
- 1984: "Giganti" / "Tempo Verra"
- 1984: "Guardian Angel"
- 1984: "Unchained Love"
- 1984: "Wir Sind Giganten" / "Zeit Für Rebellen"
- 1989: "Flieger" / "Laureen"
- 1989: "Samuraj"
- 1989: "If There Is One Thing That's Forever"
- 2001: "Engel"
- 2002: "Ich mach' meine Augen zu (Everytime)" (with Chris Norman)
- 2002: "Wenn du lachst"
- 2004: "Komm zurück zu mir"
- 2005: "Im Arm eines Engels"
- 2005: "Wie der Wind"
- 2006: "Wenn Du mich suchst"
- 2007: "Dich holt niemand mehr zurück"
- 2012: "Heiligenschein"
- 2016: "So lang mein Herz noch schlägt"
- 2017: "Liebe für immer"
- 2020: "Gesegnet und verflucht"
- 2021: "Zeit heilt keine Wunden"
- 2023: "Mein Kryptonit"
- 2024: "Irgendwann im Leben"

Preceded by Maxi & Chris Garden with "Lied für einen Freund"	Germany in the Eurovision Song Contest; 1989	Succeeded by Chris Kempers & Daniel Kovac with "Frei zu leben"
