= You Want Love (Maria, Maria...) =

1986 single by Mixed Emotions

Single by Mixed Emotions

from the album Deep from the Heart
- Released: September 1986
- Studio: Sound Studio N (Cologne, Germany)
- Length: 3:59 (7-inch version); 5:05 (extended version); 3:46 (1999 version)
- Label: Electrola
- Songwriter: Drafi Deutscher
- Producer: Drafi Deutscher

Mixed Emotions singles chronology
"You Want Love (Maria, Maria...)" (1986)	"Bring Back (Sha Na Na)" (1987)

Audio
- "You Want Love (Maria Maria...)" on YouTube

"You Want Love (Maria, Maria...)" is a song by German pop music group Mixed Emotions. It was written, recorded, produced, and mixed by band member Drafi Deutscher. The song was released in September 1986 as the band's debut single and as the lead single from their first album, Deep from the Heart (1987). It became a hit in several European countries, peaking at number four in West Germany and topping the charts of Austria and the Netherlands; in the former country, it was the best-selling single of 1987. In 1999, the song was remixed and re-released but did not achieve success, stalling at number 71 in Germany.

== Chart performance ==
In West Germany, "You Want Love" debuted at number 42 on the Media Control singles chart on 27 October 1986. The song rose up the chart over the following few weeks, entering the top 10 on 24 November. From then until 12 January 1987, the song rose and fell within the top 10, initially peaking at number five that week. Afterwards, the song dropped down the chart, exiting the top 40 on 23 February. However, the song regained popularity and ascended back into the top 10 two weeks later, reaching its final peak of number four on 23 March. It remained within the top 75 for 17 more weeks, totalling 38 weeks on the West German chart altogether. As a result of its longevity, it ended 1987 at number four on Media Control's year-end chart, outselling all but three number-one hits. Following the song's remixing in 1999, a new single was released and peaked at number 71 on the German chart, staying within the top 100 for only four weeks.

"You Want Love" also experienced success in other European countries. On the Austrian Singles Chart, the single debuted at number 15 on 15 December 1986. No more charts were published until 1 January 1987, by which time the song had jumped to number one. It stayed there for another week, then was temporarily knocked down to number two by Status Quo's "In the Army Now". "You Want Love" returned to the top spot on 22 January, where it remained for another four weeks before losing the number-one position for the final time. It spent 26 weeks on the Austrian chart, ending 1987 as the country's most successful hit and earning a gold recording certification for selling over 50,000 copies. In Switzerland, the song began its chart run by repeatedly entering the exiting the Schweizer Hitparade in late 1986 and early 1987, charting higher with each appearance. On 15 February 1987, it reappeared at number 23 and stayed on the chart continuously from that week onward. It peaked at number three on 22 March, logging 19 weeks on the Swiss chart in total, and ended 1987 at number 16 on the year-end ranking.

On Sweden's Topplistan singles chart, "You Want Love" debuted at number 15 on 11 February 1987. Three weeks later, it peaked at number two, where it stayed for a second week, then dropped out of the top 20 four weeks later. It also charted in neighbouring Norway, where it spent two nonconsecutive weeks on the VG-lista chart, peaking at number 10 during both instances. In Belgium, on the Ultratop chart, the single spent 11 of its 15 weeks within the top 10, peaking at number two for four nonconsecutive weeks. At the end of 1987, Ultratop placed the song at number three on its year-end chart. In the Netherlands, "You Want Love" reached number one on both the Dutch Top 40 and Nationale Hitparade, spending two weeks atop both charts. It spent 14 weeks on the former chart and 19 on the latter. The Dutch Top 40 ranked the song as the fourth-most-successful hit of 1987 while the Nationale Hitparade ranked it as the sixth-biggest hit. The same year, the Nederlandse Vereniging van Producenten en Importeurs (NVPI) awarded the single a gold record for shipping over 50,000 units in the Netherlands.

== Track listings ==
7-inch single

A. "You Want Love" (You Gotta Come Back Brown Eye) – 3:59
B. "You Want Love" (You Gotta Come Back Brown Eye—instrumental version) – 3:59

12-inch single

A. "You Want Love" (You Gotta Come Back Brown Eye) – 5:05
B. "You Want Love" (You Gotta Come Back Brown Eye—instrumental version) – 5:05

12-inch single (Special Re-Emotion mix)

A1. "You Want Love" (Special Re-Emotion mix) – 5:35
B1. "You Want Love" (12-inch version) – 5:05
B2. "You Want Love" (7-inch version) – 3:59

Maxi-CD single (1999)

1. "You Want Love (Maria, Maria)" (radio version '99) – 3:46
2. "You Want Love (Maria, Maria)" (rap version) – 3:46
3. "Open Your Heart" – 3:44

== Charts ==
=== Weekly charts ===
Chart (1987)	Peak position
Austria (Ö3 Austria Top 40)	1
Belgium (Ultratop 50 Flanders)	2
Europe (European Hot 100 Singles)	25
Netherlands (Dutch Top 40)	1
Netherlands (Single Top 100)	1
Norway (VG-lista)	10
Sweden (Sverigetopplistan)	2
Switzerland (Schweizer Hitparade)	3
West Germany (GfK)	4

Chart (1999)	Peak position
Germany (GfK)	71

=== Year-end charts ===
Chart (1987)	Position
Austria (Ö3 Austria Top 40)	1
Belgium (Ultratop)	3
Netherlands (Dutch Top 40)	4
Netherlands (Nationale Hitparade)	6
Switzerland (Schweizer Hitparade)	16
West Germany (Media Control)	4

== Certifications ==
Region	Certification	Certified units/sales
Austria (IFPI Austria)	Gold	50,000
Netherlands (NVPI)	Gold	50,000

== Release history ==
Region	Date	Format(s)	Label(s)	Ref.
Germany	September 1986	7-inch vinyl; 12-inch vinyl	Electrola	
Germany	19 April 1999	Maxi-CD	EMI Electrola	
