= Daniele Rizzo =

German Italian actor, comedian, and TV presenter

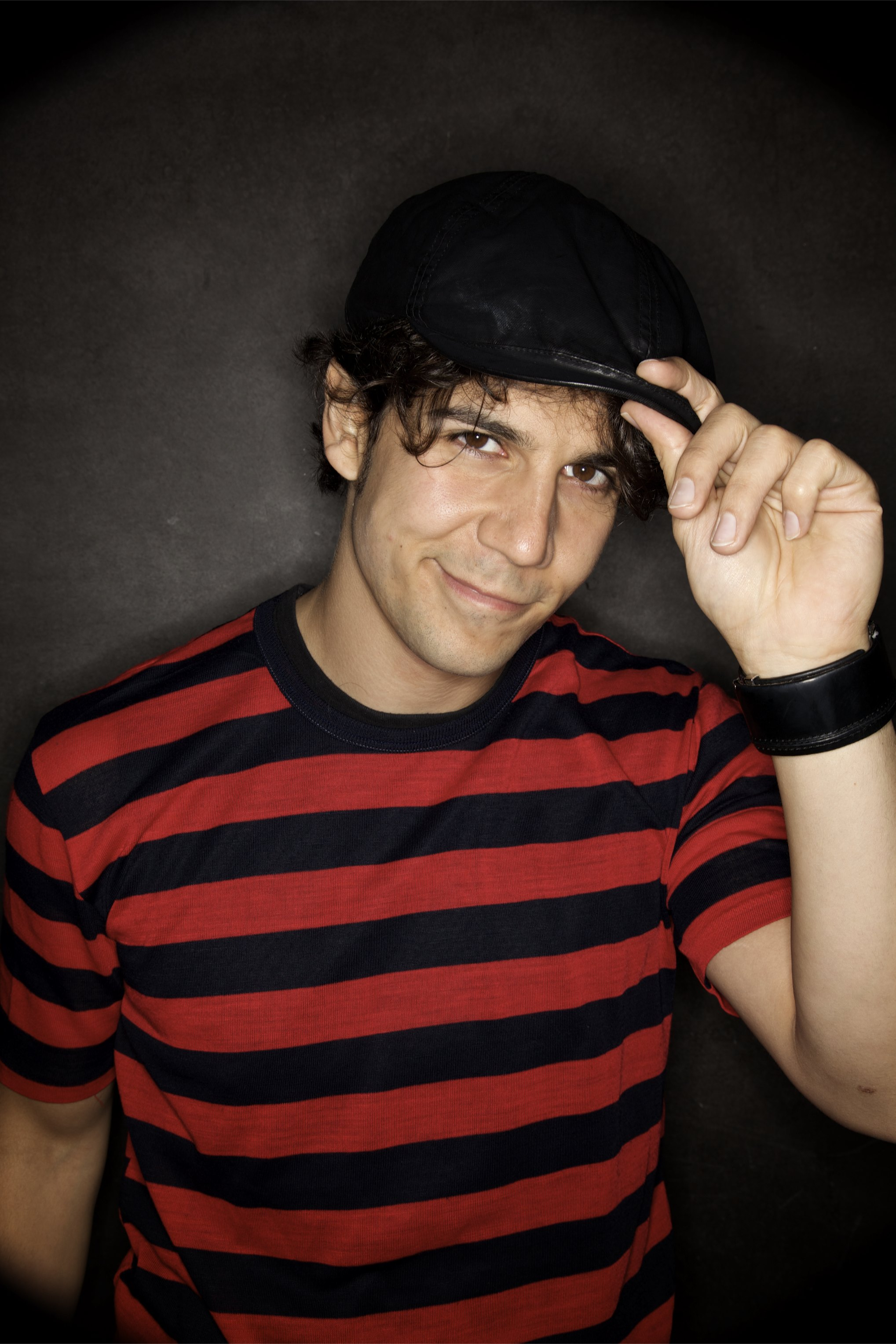
- Rizzo in November 2009
- Born: Daniele Rizzo; 19 January 1984 (age 42); Hannover, West Germany
- Citizenship: Germany; Italy
- Occupations: Actor; Comedian; TV presenter
- Years active: 2003–present

Daniele Rizzo (born 19 January 1984) is a German Italian comedian, actor, and TV presenter.

== Biography ==
Rizzo was born in Hannover to Italian parents, and grew up in Dortmund. His father was a diplomat and his mother a businesswoman. He was raised bilingual in German and Italian, and completed his high school education in 2003 in Dortmund.

Rizzo has appeared in several television films on German networks including ARD, RTL, and ZDF. He has been a commentator on many German-language YouTube channels, discussing and debating about films and video games.

In October 2009, the SAE Institute awarded him a prize as "best character" in an amateur horror film. In 2017, he was awarded by Super RTL for his role as presenter in the documentary category.
