= Mixed Emotions (band) =

German pop music band

Background information
- Origin: Germany
- Genres: Pop
- Years active: 1986–1992, 1999
- Label: EMI
- Past members: Drafi Deutscher; Oliver Simon

Mixed Emotions was a German pop music group formed in 1986 by vocalists Drafi Deutscher (9 May 1946 – 9 June 2006) and Oliver Simon (14 May 1957 – 31 July 2013). Deutscher sang, wrote/co-wrote and produced/co-produced all Mixed Emotions' songs, many of which were co-written with regular producer and musical contributor Christopher Evans Ironside.

Their best known hit is probably that from their first year, the song "You Want Love (Maria, Maria...)". Other well-known songs are "Bring Back (Sha Na Na)", "Sweetheart - Darlin' My Dear", "Just for You" and "I Never Give Up". After five best selling singles and two successful albums, the group split in 1989.

In 1991, Drafi Deutscher decided to continue with a new member, Andreas Martin, under a slightly changed name – New Mixed Emotions. The new line-up released an album called Side By Side and two singles.

In 1999, the original line-up of Drafi Deutscher and Oliver Simon reunited under the original name the Mixed Emotions for a new album called We Belong Together consisting of two new songs and 11 remakes (new music, new vocals) of their old hits. They had a number of successful TV appearances. Following this album the group disbanded again.

Drafi Deutscher died of heart failure in Frankfurt am Main on 9 June 2006. He was 60.

Oliver Simon was born in Wolfratshausen. He died of a brain tumor on 31 July 2013. He was 56.

== Discography ==
=== Albums ===
- Deep from the Heart 1987
- Just for You 1988
- Side by Side (as 'New Mixed Emotions') 1991
- We Belong Together 1999

=== Compilations ===
- Mixed Emotions (Best Of) 1990
- The Essential Drafi Deutscher / Mixed Emotions 2004
- My Star 2020

=== Singles ===
- "You Want Love (Maria, Maria...)" 1986
- "Bring Back (Sha Na Na)" 1987
- "Sweetheart – Darlin' – My Dear (Lisa My Love)" 1987
- "Just for You" 1988
- "I Never Give Up" 1989
- "Sensuality (When I Touch You)" (as 'New Mixed Emotions') 1991
- "Lonely Lover" (as 'New Mixed Emotions') 1991
- "You Want Love '99" 1999
- "Bring Back '99" 1999

== Other ==
"You Want Love (Maria, Maria...)" was also re-recorded with Norwegian lyrics by Norwegian artist Rune Rudberg in 1988 as "Ut Mot Havet", his definite breakthrough song, included on an album with the same.
