= Zack! Comedy nach Maß =

- Genre: Comedy
- Starring: Volker Michalowski
- Country of origin: Germany
- Original language: German

Production
- Producer: Tommy Wosch
- Running time: 22 minutes

Original release
- Network: Sat. 1
- Release: January 28, 2005

Zack! Comedy nach Maß (English: Zack! Comedy Made) is a half-hour sketch-comedy series from Germany with Volker Michalowski in the lead role.

== Action ==
Comedian and actor Michalowski played a helpless klutz who constantly gets into problematic and complicated life situations from which he in a few words, slapstick broke free again and crazy actions. He slipped into each sketch in different roles. In total, he played since the first episode more than 100 different roles.

== See also ==
- List of German television series
