= Die Rote Meile =

- Genre: Drama; Thriller
- Country of origin: Germany
- Original language: German
- No. of seasons: 2
- No. of episodes: 39

Production
- Production locations: Munich, Germany
- Production company: Bavaria Film GmbH

Original release
- Network: Sat.1
- Release: 1 October 1999 – 8 March 2001

Die Rote Meile is a German television drama that aired on Sat.1 and follows the lives of strippers, prostitutes and their pimps in the district of St. Pauli in Hamburg. The first season premiered on 1 October 1999 and consisted of 26 episodes. The show was a rival to the RTL drama Hinter Gittern - Der Frauenknast; both airing in the same time-slot - Monday nights at 9:15 pm. A second season was ordered by the network in the spring of 2000 and started airing on Thursday nights at 8:15 pm on 14 December 2000. The show was canceled in the beginning of 2001, airing its last episode on 8 March 2001.

== Synopsis ==
Johnny Roland owns the strip club "Candy Club" in the district of St. Pauli in Hamburg. He falls in love with his neighbor Annette Verhoven, while forming a rivalry with her brother Andreas, who wants to take over Johnny's club. Annette has to deal with the hostility of Johnny's daughter Sascha and has to prove herself to fit into Johnny's world of naked skin. Crime lord Wilhelm Kastor becomes Johnny's personal enemy and tries to destroy everything Johnny has.

== Cast ==
- Leon Boden as Johnny Roland, owner of the "Candy Club" and eventually the boyfriend of Annette Verhoven. He's killed in the second season's premiere by a hitman working for Wilhelm Kastor as he jumps in front of Annette to protect her from getting killed.
- Ann-Cathrin Sudhoff as Annette Verhoven, becomes Johnny's girlfriend and after his death takes over his business. She's also the sister of Andreas Verhoven, who tries to get the "Candy Club" for himself.
- Fabian Harloff as Andreas Verhoven, brother of Annette and rival to Johnny Roland as he tries to take over the "Candy Club".
- Silvana Bayer as Sascha Roland, daughter of Johnny, who at first tries to break up her father's relationship with Annette, but eventually becomes her ally after Johnny's killed.
- Yasmina Filali as Yvonne, one of the strippers of the "Candy Club" and a good friend of Johnny. After his death, she and Annette take over his business.
- Cornelia Corba as Roxy, another member of the "Candy Club".
- Markus Majowski as Ulrich, gay man and heart and soul of the "Candy Club" as he controls everything behind the scenes of the strip club.
- Sylvia Leifheit as Luna, who at first works for Johnny but later betrays him and becomes the mistress of Wilhelm Kastor.
- Renate Geißler as Marita Roland, mother of Johnny who helps Annette and Yvonne after Johnny's death.
- Dirk Galuba as Wilhelm Kastor, crime lord and enemy of Johnny Roland. Sets up a hitman to kill Johnny's girlfriend Annette, who instead kills Johnny as he jumps in front of Annette to protect her.

== Production ==
Even though the show is set in Hamburg, it was purely filmed in Munich. The network created the show as a rival to RTL's successful Hinter Gittern - Der Frauenknast. Die Rote Meile never matched the show in ratings, but was a success for the network itself. This led to the network's decision to move the show from Monday to Thursday nights for its second season. The move proved unpopular as the ratings declined. As one of the reasons, next to the move, was said that the death of main character Johnny Roland took the show's heart and the stories became meaningless. The production of the show ended in fall of 2000. About six months later the show was canceled.

== See also ==
- List of German television series
