= Guardian Angel (Drafi Deutscher song) =

1983 song by Masquerade

Single by Masquerade

from the album The Sound Of Masquerade
- B-side: "Silent Echos Of Katja"
- Released: 11 December 1983
- Recorded: 1982
- Length: 4:30
- Label: London Records
- Songwriter(s): Christopher Evans-Ironside, Kurt Gebegern
- Producer(s): Drafi Deutscher, Christopher Evans-Ironside

Masquerade singles chronology
"'Guardian Angel'" (1983)	"Everyday Loser" (1984)

"Guardian Angel" is a 1983 song by Drafi Deutscher under the pen name Masquerade. German and Italian cover versions, named "Jenseits von Eden" and "La valle dell'Eden" respectively, were released by Nino de Angelo in the same year.

== History ==
The song was originally released by Drafi Deutscher under the pen name Masquerade. It charted in Germany as well as in several other nations and is the second most famous song by Deutscher after "Marmor, Stein und Eisen bricht" (engl. Marble, Stone and Iron Breaks). In the UK, the song was released in a version sung by Nino de Angelo who had also recorded German and Italian covers (see below). De Angelo's version reached number 57 on the UK Singles Chart.

== Music video ==
Numerous European TV-show appearances of Masquerade were used as separate music videos for the song. The hitmusic television-show was called Eldorado and the video featured two men in white makeup lip syncing to Deutscher's vocals.

== Other Appearances ==
In 2022, the song was featured on the web series Angel Hare, where the titular character, Jonah Whitman, reunites with his guardian angel, Angel Gabby. The song is heard faintly in the background of this video.

== Track listings ==
12" Single

1. Guardian Angel 5:10
2. Silent Echos Of Katja 3:57

7" Single

1. Guardian Angel 4:30
2. Silent Echos Of Katja 3:57

== Charts ==
Chart (1983/84)	Peak position
Austrian Singles Chart	1
Danish Singles Chart	1
German Singles Chart	2
Swiss Singles Chart	2
Swedish Singles Chart	4
Dutch Top 40	5
Italian Singles Chart	7
New Zealand Singles Chart	7
Australian Singles Chart	27

Drafi Deutscher released the German version of the song—"Jenseits von Eden"— on his greatest hits collection Diesmal für immer in 1987.

== Nino de Angelo versions ==
"Jenseits von Eden"

Single by Nino de Angelo

from the album Jenseits von Eden
- B-side: "Silbermond"
- Released: 27 November 1983
- Recorded: 1982–1983
- Length: 3:50
- Label: Polydor Records
- Songwriter(s): Drafi Deutscher, Christopher Evans-Ironside, Joachim Horn-Bernges
- Producer(s): Elmar Kast, Joachim Horn-Bernges

Nino de Angelo singles chronology
"Engel und Teufel, Luisa" (1983)	"'Jenseits von Eden'" (1983)	"Atemlos" (1984)

In the same year, German singer Nino de Angelo released a German-language version called "Jenseits von Eden" ("East of Eden") as well as an album with the same name. There was also an Italian-language version of the song, which – due to a mistake – originally had the Spanish name La valle del Edén. In 1984, the Italian title was changed to the correct La valle dell'Eden.

=== Track listings ===
7" Single

1. Jenseits von Eden 3:50
2. Silbermond 3:20

=== Charts ===
Chart (1983–1985)	Peak position
Australia (Kent Music Report)	27
Austria (Ö3 Austria Top 40)	1
Belgium (Ultratop 50 Flanders)	11
Netherlands (Dutch Top 40)	17
Netherlands (Single Top 100)	13
New Zealand (Recorded Music NZ)	19
Switzerland (Schweizer Hitparade)	1
UK Singles (OCC)	57
West Germany (GfK)	1

=== Certifications ===
Sales certifications for Jenseits von Eden
Region	Certification	Certified units/sales
Austria (IFPI Austria)	Gold	50,000^{*}
France (SNEP)	Gold	500,000^{*}
Germany (BVMI)	Gold	500,000^{^}
Italy (FIMI)	Gold	
Switzerland (IFPI Switzerland)	Gold	25,000^{^}
^{*} Sales figures based on certification alone.^{^} Shipments figures based on certification alone.
