= Ein Fall für die Anrheiner =

German television series

- Genre: Weekly Soap
- Created by: Elke Ried
- Starring: Tommy Engel (as Coco Kließ); Jochen Schroeder as Paul Overath; Antje Lewald (as Anita Overath); Kirstin Hesse (as Nicole Overath); Julia Beerhold (as Karin Radke); Ludger Burmann (as Darius Pawelczik); Hildegard Krekel (as Uschi Schmitz); Jenny Jürgens (as Dr. Kerstin Steinmann); Claudia Matschulla (as Katja Gruber); Samy Orfgen (as Lisa Pawelczik); Giovanni Luzi (as Horst Schneider); Susanne Seidler (as Lydia von Bebenberg)
- Theme music composer: Tommy Engel
- Opening theme: Die Minsche am Ring (Instrumental)
- Country of origin: Germany
- Original language: German
- No. of seasons: 3
- No. of episodes: 111

Production
- Running time: 30 minutes
- Production companies: Westdeutscher Rundfunk Köln, Zieglerfilm Köln

Original release
- Network: WDR Fernsehen
- Release: 1 May 2011 – 2014

Ein Fall für die Anrheiner is a German television series.

== See also ==
- Die Anrheiner (1998 – 2011)
- List of German television series
