= Drafi Deutscher =

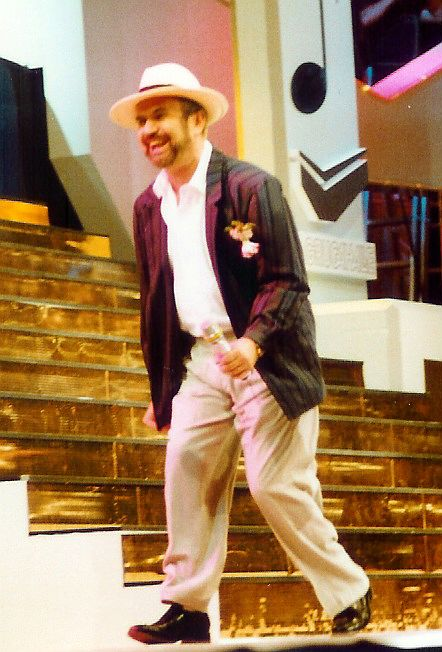
- Drafi Deutscher in 1989

Background information
- Born: Drafi Franz Richard Deutscher; 9 May 1946; Charlottenburg, British occupation zone in Germany
- Died: 9 June 2006 (aged 60) Frankfurt am Main, Hesse, Germany
- Genre: Schlager music
- Occupation: singer
- Years active: 1964–2006

Drafi Franz Richard Deutscher (9 May 1946 – 9 June 2006) was a Sinti-German singer and songwriter.

== Biography ==
=== Early life and career ===
Deutscher was born in Charlottenburg, in the western zone of Berlin, Germany. Between 1964 and 1966, Deutscher had a string of hits in Germany, for example "Shake Hands" (1964 No. 1), "Keep Smiling" (1964 No. 7), "Cinderella Baby" (1965 No. 3), "Heute male ich dein Bild, Cindy-Lou" (1965 No. 1).

=== 1965–1967: Marmor, Stein und Eisen bricht and career peak ===
His best known song is the 1965 Schlager "Marmor, Stein und Eisen bricht" (lit. "Marble, Stone and Iron Break"), which sold over one million copies, and was awarded a golden record.

Nineteen-year-old Deutscher had ad-libbed the tune during an October 1965 audition at Musikverlag Edition Intro Gebrüder Meisel GmbH by humming the melody and only singing the characteristic chorus line of "Dum-Dum, Dum-dum"; asked by present songwriter Christian Bruhn what he intended to do with it to turn it into a complete song, he replied, "Det machst du! ("That's done by you!"), so songwriter Günter Loose subsequently wrote the German lyrics to the melody.

In the US, the song was released in 1966 under the title "Marble Breaks and Iron Bends" with English lyrics sung by Deutscher. This English version entered the Billboard Hot 100 in May 1966, peaking at No. 80, and sparking a number of English cover versions by contemporary acts such as The Deejays (under the title "Dum Dum (Marble Breaks and Iron Bends)"), as well as by the two Australian acts Peter Fenton and Toni & Royce (aka Toni McCann and Royce Nicholas), none of which seem to have charted. The song later featured in the 2006 film Beerfest, during the Oktoberfest scene.

=== 1967 to early 1980s: Trial, obscurity, and working under pseudonyms ===
After his 1965 hit "Marmor, Stein und Eisen bricht", his career in Germany was in full swing, when it was shaken by a 1967 conviction for public indecency (Erregung öffentlichen Ärgernisses) after he had urinated from a balcony while drunk, in plain view of a group of schoolchildren watching him from street level. After his 1967 conviction for public indecency, he virtually disappeared from the public eye as a singer for more than a decade, writing and producing several worldwide hits for Tina Rainford, Boney M, Nino de Angelo and Tony Christie throughout the 1970s under a number of pen names. His few appearances included the song "United (Te Deum)" from 1971 in the show Disco on German television, and the duet "Alaska" with long time friend Tina Rainford in 1972, a song he wrote under the pseudonym 'Renate Vaplus' but produced under his real name. He also wrote and produced Rainford's hits "Silver Bird" and "Fly Away Pretty Flamingo" from 1976. In 1977, he performed as 'Mr. Walkie-Talkie' the song "Be My Boogie Woogie Baby", which was a hit in the Netherlands and Flanders, and peaked at number 62 in Australia. The accompanying album however did not have any impact. As 'Jack Goldbird' he performed as a country singer, often accompanying Tina Rainford as an anonymous supporting act.

It took until the early 1980s for him to make media appearances as a singer again. In 1982, a biopic loosely inspired by Deutscher's life was released to German theaters under the title of his greatest hit, Marmor, Stein und Eisen bricht, in which he appeared in a small cameo role.

=== Mid-1980s and beyond: Comeback ===
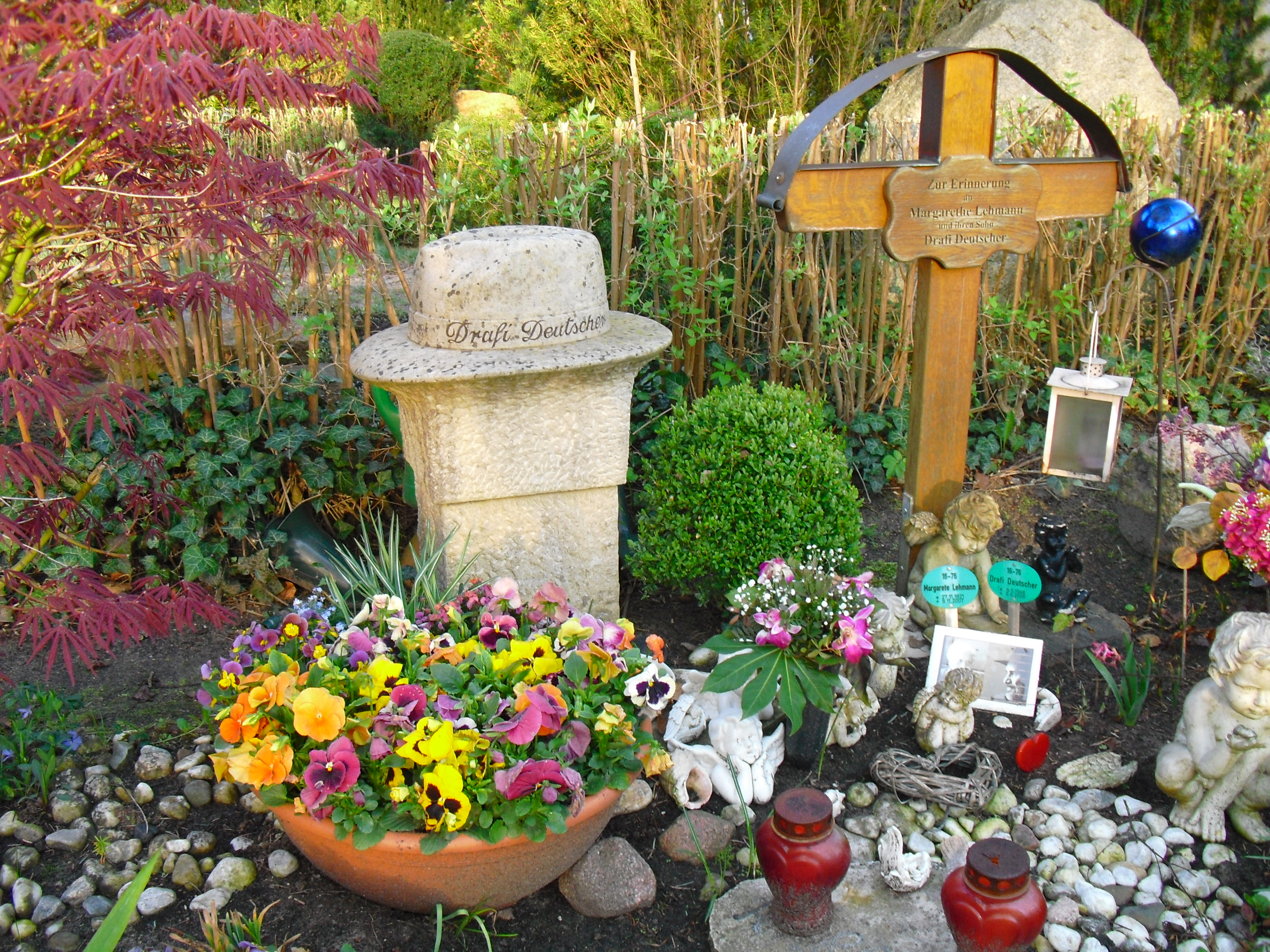
Drafi Deutscher's grave in Parkfriedhof Lichterfelde (Berlin-Lichterfelde)

Deutscher worked with Christopher Evans Ironside, collaborating with him on a project named Masquerade, and on their co-written 1984 hit, "Guardian Angel", which was popular in many countries. Deutscher would enlist the assistance of two substitute performers from Hamburg, Germany, named Guenter Urban and Ole Olsen. These two men would dress up in white face paint and tuxedos, and lip sync (mime) to Deutscher's music. However, the majority of their live performances are of Guardian Angel, with only one performance of the hit song "Everyday Loser", appearing on the April 2, 1984 airing of the German television music program "Formel Eins". These two songs would be the only two to have live broadcast performances. Guenter and Olsen's first appearances would be on the German music program "Vorsicht Musik" in 1984.

In late 1986, he achieved success with his duo, Mixed Emotions, together with Oliver Simon, and their single "You Want Love (Maria, Maria...)", a collaboration which sparked three more follow-up hit singles in a row by 1987, a TV theme hit in 1988 ("Running Wild", used for an episode of the crime series Eurocops), and by its success finally inspired him to release his first new album under his real name in two decades, 1989's Über Grenzen geh'n (lit. "Crossing frontiers"). Deutscher's "Das 11. Gebot" got some airplay in 1989 on German radio.

=== Declining health and death ===
In November 1998, Deutscher suffered two strokes, followed by a breakdown in 1999 due to increasing diabetes. He nevertheless continued touring, celebrating his 40-year stage anniversary in 2003. Deutscher died from heart failure in 2006 in Frankfurt, at the age of 60.

== Album discography ==
- Shake Hands! Keep Smiling!, 1964
- Drafi!, 1966
- Weil ich Dich liebe, 1971
- Die Welt von heut (Group "Wir"), 1972
- Gute Tage & schlechte Tage, 1973
- Happy Rummel Music (as "Mr. Walkie Talkie"), 1977
- Lost in New York City, 1981
- Drafi, 1982 (extended re-release of 1966 album)
- The Sound of Masquerade (as "Masquerade"), 1984 - AUS #91
- Krieg der Herzen, 1985
- Gemischte Gefühle, 1986
- Deep From the Heart (Mixed Emotions), 1987
- Diesmal für immer, 1987
- Just For You (Mixed Emotions), 1988
- Steinzart – Die besten Jahre, 1988
- Lost in New York City (remix), 1989
- Über Grenzen geh'n, 1989
- Side by Side (with Andreas Martin as New Mixed Emotions), 1991
- Wie Ebbe und Flut, 1992
- So viele Fragen, 1996
- Zukunft, 1998
- We Belong Together (Mixed Emotions), 1999
- Wer war Schuld daran, 2002
- Diesseits von Eden – Die große Drafi Deutscher Hit-Collection, 2006
- The Last Mile, 2007
- Drafi (Re-release of the 1982 album with six bonus tracks), 2008
