= Schloss Einstein =

- Genre: Children's television series
- Created by: Katharina Rietz (seasons 1–13); Martin Hofmann (seasons 1–10); Hans-Werner Honert (seasons 11, 14–); Yvonne Abele (seasons 14–)
- Country of origin: Germany
- Original language: German
- No. of episodes: 1130+

Production
- Running time: 25 minutes

Original release
- Network: KiKA
- Release: 4 September 1998

Schloss Einstein is a long-running German television series which is designed as a teenage soap opera. It portrays the lives of teenagers in Schloss Einstein (Castle Einstein), a fictional boarding school. The intended audience is 10- to 14-year-olds.

The series combines the genres of comedy, action, drama (e.g., first love, problems with parents and schoolmates), and natural science. Scripts for the series are written by prominent television script writers.

== Current airtimes ==
New episodes of Schloss Einstein are currently shown on Mondays at 8:10 p.m. on channel KiKA. Older episodes are shown regularly from Monday to Friday at 2:10 p.m. on KiKA.

== History ==
Schloss Einstein was developed and produced by Askania Media Filmproduktion by order of the ARD under the auspices of the MDR and WDR.

Starting in September 2007, Saxonia Media Filmproduktion took over production of the series.

Because the show has its own genre as a Kinder-Weekly (children's weekly), the producers had had no experience with this kind of series. Originally, only 76 episodes were planned. ARD went to yearly sequels after they knew it was a success. Since then, each season of production has consisted of 52 episodes, which are shot in 13 blocks of four episodes each.

The first episode was aired September 4, 1998, on channel KiKA. Prior to the show's eleventh season (which began in January 2008), a total of 480 episodes had been produced. Episode 480 was the last episode that was set in the fictional village of Seelitz.

As of spring 2025, a total of 1,104 episodes in 28 seasons have aired. This is a running milestone in German television programming. Worldwide, Schloss Einstein is the longest-running fictional children's television series (among those that employ child actors).

== Concept ==
Schloss Einstein is a television show intended for an audience of children. The show guides its viewers through the entire school year and offers characters with whom children can identify. Because the actors are the same age as their viewers, their actions look authentic.

In its representation of classroom lessons, real knowledge is taught. Thus the show provides both entertainment and instruction. It provides education in a relaxed way. Because it has implemented this concept, Schloss Einstein is unique worldwide and has been made the object of several scientific studies.

== Storyline ==
Dr. Stollberg realizes a dream. He establishes a private school in an old castle and names his school "the Albert-Einstein-Gymnasium, Internat Schloss Seelitz". The school bears the name of the founder of the theory of relativity because it teaches natural science. Its students shorten the long name, and it is thereafter known as "Schloss Einstein".

Dr. Stollberg wants to provide an education for his students by using his best strength — personal tutoring. Violence is forbidden in the school. Problems that arise must be solved peacefully and, if possible, by the children themselves. Newcomers are given an older student who acts as a "godparent". Of course, this does not always go smoothly, but the teachers and students must master their everyday life under a common roof.

At the center of the show are the personal responsibilities of teenagers from class 6 to class 8. Because there are no parents present, the children must make decisions for themselves and be prepared for the consequences. A few adults appear as advisers or counselors.

The students experience problems such as grades, cliques, envy, friendships, puberty, first love, career hopes, alcoholism, and the divorce or unemployment of their parents.

In many episodes, the students have adventures and learn how to manage conflicts. They also have fun with all kinds of jokes and pranks. There is tension between the Schloss Einstein students and the students who attend public schools. They do not like each other but have to get along. Compromise and tolerance are important in these relationships.

In the later episodes, which are set in the city of Erfurt, no public school students are present. However, students who attend other private schools are present from time to time.

== Setting and cast ==
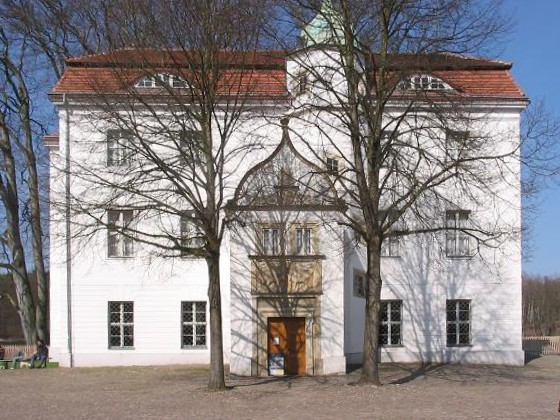
Jagdschloss Grunewald, a backdrop for the Schloss Einstein school.

The first ten seasons were set in the fictional village of Seelitz, near Berlin. With the advent of the eleventh season on January 5, 2008, (episode 481) the setting was transferred to the real city of Erfurt.

=== In Seelitz ===
Schloss Einstein was shot from 1998 to 2007 (episodes 1–480) on the grounds of the Babelsberg Studios in Potsdam. The Jagdschloss Grunewald in Berlin served as backdrop. Outdoor filming was done in the Klein Glienicke quarter of Potsdam and in surrounding villages.

==== Main cast ====
Students

Actor	Role	Tenure
Anina Abt-Stein	Louisa Ellwang	2000–2002
Patrick Baehr	Anton Mahnke	2006–2007
Philip Baumgarten	Tom Kühne	1998–1999
Michael Behm	Pascal Merten	1999
Paula Birnbaum	Iris Kleintann	1998–2000
Sarah Blaßkiewitz	Josephine Langmann	2000–2002
Katrin Blume	Alexandra Wilde	1998–2001
Geertje Boeden	Antje van Rheeden	1998–2000
Kristin Bohm	Sylvia Ziethen	2001–2004
Natascha Born	Anne-Claire "A.C." Clemens	2001–2005
Antoine Brison	René Dupont	2006–2007
Juliane Brummund	Nadine Steiner, adopted, née Langhammer	1998–2001
Dorian Brunz	Eugen Weise	2006–2007
Raphael D'Souza	Dennis Nakeba	2003–2006
Marcus Diller	Jan Winter	2004–2006
Joanna Eichhorn	Biliana "Billi" Reiche	2005–2007
Garry Fischmann	Ben Kubanka	2007
Christoph Förster	Philip Schwehrs	2000–2002
Max Fritzsching	Joshua "Josh" Friedlein	2002–2004
Kumaran Ganeshan	Budhi Dondra	1998–2001
Franziska Gembalowski	Margareta "Maggi" Artig	2005–2006
Philipp Gerstner	Sven Koslowski	2003–2007
Zeno Gries	Armin von der Heyde	2005–2006
Katja Großkinsky	Verena Krug	2005–2007
Dennis Habedank	Benjamin Lewin	2001–2005
Max von Hören	Jonas von Lettow	2005–2006
Christian Karn	Hendrik Wernicke	2001–2004
Jerusha Kloke	Paula Krüger	2001–2004
Kevin Köppe	Alexander "Alex" Kirchner	2006–2007
Christoph Kozik	Franz Bartel	1999–2002
Martin Krahn	Max Richter	2000–2003
Marie-Luisa Kunst	Elisabeth von Hohenfels	2000–2002
Laura Laß	Katharina Börner	1998–1999
Adrien Löffler	Romeo Gürtler	2001–2003
Zoe Luck	Lilly Liebermann	2006–2007
Mandy-Marie Mahrenholz	Laura Marwege	1999–2005
Anna Majtkowski	Tinka Teubner	2004–2006
Georg Malcovati	Marc Börner	1998–2000
Cynthia Micas	Joana Hofmeister	2004–2006
Jana Müller	Ira Müller	1998–2000
Antonia Münchow	Marleen Schulte	2006–2007
Emely Neubert	Manuela "Manu" Vogt	2002–2005
Josepha Niebelschütz	Saira Sieger	2006–2007
Paul Niemann	Lukas Düber	2005–2007
Maximilian Oelze	Johannes Bodenstein	2000–2004
Julia Popke	Kim Riemann	1999–2003
Sofie Popke	Charlotte "Charlie" Hauke	2003–2006
Josefine Preuß	Anna Reichenbach	2000–2004
Ronja Prinz	Tessa Rindfleisch	2002–2006
Vivienne Puttins	Vanessa Turner	2006–2007
Felix Rehn	Kai Steffens	2004–2007
Shalin-Tanita Rogall	Annika Schubert	2003–2007
Friederike Anna Schäfer	Emma Schumacher	2003–2006
Philipp Scheffler	Tobias Klinger	2002–2005
Florens Schmidt	Oliver Schuster	1998–2001
Jojo Schöning	Chu-Yong "Chui" Wang	2005–2007
Paula Schramm	Emely Busch	2001–2006
Lisa Schumme	Thekla Singer	2001–2004
Lucas Scupin	Felix Kindermann	2003–2006
Anja Stadlober	Vera Seiffert	1998–2001
Laura Stahnke	Konstanze "Konny" Winkler	2004–2007
Anne-Sophie Strauss	Franziska "Franzi" Bauer	2002–2006
Franziska Stürmer	Monika Freising	1998–2002
Daniel Wachowiak	Leonard "Leon" Diefenbach	2002–2006
Romina Weber	Dorothee "Doro" Schatz	2000–2004
Tobias Weihe	Moritz Stein	2005–2007
Marcus Wengler	Sebastian Goder	2000–2003
Katharina Wien	Susann "Sue" Birnbaum	2003–2007
Lieven Wölk	Valentin Schlösser	2003–2006
Sandrina Zander	Marie-Sophie Müller-Kellinghaus	2004–2007

Teachers and Staff

Actor	Role	Tenure
Karsten Blumenthal	Hannes Fabian	1999–2006
Jessica Boehrs	Nina Waldgruber	2006–2007
Dominique Chiout	Sabine Pätzold	1998–2000
Daniel Enzweiler	Gregor Haller	2001–2007
Rebekka Fleming († 04/2014)	Marianne Gallwitz	1998–2007
Simone Frost († 14/10/2009)	Sibylle Seiffert	1999–2007
Christiane Hagemann	Sascha Hansen	2001–2003
Jan Hartmann	Mark Lachmann	2006–2009
Ludwig Hollburg	Dr. Lutz Wolfert	1998–2007
Judith Klein	Nadja Kunze	2000–2006
Wilfried Loll	Dr. Emanuel Stollberg	1998–2007
Gert Schaefer († 20/08/2014)	Heinz Pasulke	1998–2014
Robert Schupp	Dr. Michael Berger	2006–
Shirin Soraya	Kleopatra Klawitter	2005–2007
Grit Stephan	Sandra Weintraub	2006–2007
Maren Thurm	Barbara Bodenstein	2001–2005
Svea Timander	Ragna Delling	2000–2001
Jörg Zufall	Sven Weber	1998–2000

Village Youth

Actor	Role	Tenure
Janine Appel	Tine Bergmann	1998–2001
Gregor Czempiel	Wolf Wagner	1998–2002
Mara-Louisa Dittmann	Sara Simons	2003–2006
Maurice Engst	Janosch Arnold	2007
Jonathan Feurich	David Hoppel	2002–2006
Simon Hahn	Ronny	2006–2007
Julian Hanschke	Ingo Brussow	1998–2001
Bojan Heyn	Marcel Müller	2006
Eva Kaibel	Caro Seller	2006
Julian Vinzenz Krüger	Rolf Roland "Rollo" Reisig	2006–2007
Fee Luck	Nele Arnold	2007
Benjamin Neumann	Otto Hempel	2001–2006
Samantha Preilowski	Antonia Fabri	2003–2005
Benjamin Seidel	Paul Ragowski	2005–2007
Kristin Tetz	Krissi Renner	2005–2006
Tino Wagner	Kevin Bodenstein	2000–2002
Adrian Wahlen	Manuel Rudolph	2006–2007
Raimund Widra	Atze Feilke	1998–2001

=== In Erfurt ===
Since September 2007, Schloss Einstein is produced by Saxonia Media Filmproduktion and filmed at the Kindermedienzentrum Erfur.

The school has two different buildings: the school building and the dormitory building. The Kindermedienzentrum Erfurt contains all the sets for the school.

The set for the school building has classrooms, a cafeteria, hallways, stairs, and a gymnasium. It also contains all the sets used for the dormitory building. Outside filming is done in the egapark, in other places in Erfurt, and in Schlosspark Arnstadt.

==== Main cast ====
Students

Actor	Role	Tenure
Noah Alibayli	Henk Ochs	2015–2016
Hendrik Annel	Fabian "Stasi" Stass	2008–2009
Tiesan-Yesim Atas	Lejla Rahimi	2015–2016
Marie Borchardt	Pia "Pippi" Pigalke	2012–2017
Maximilian Braun	Lennard Pracht	2016–
Julian Buchmann	Benjamin "Ben" Pfennig	2016
Flavius Budean	Orkan Török	2015–
Daniel Conrad	Lukas "Lucky" Pohlenz	2008–2009
Tessa Dökel	Luisa Barthélemy	2017-
Ferdinand Dölz	Bruno Schneider, adopted, né Schaarschmidt	2008–2012
Kaja Eckert	Kathi Semmler	2015–
Edzard Ehrle	Tamas Nagy	2010–2012
Wassilij Eichler	Mounir Farsad	2008–2010
Svea Engel	Serena Eickner	2013–2015
Johna Fontaine	Daphne Leandros	2013–2016; 2017
Henrieke Fritz	Constanze von Blumenberg	2012–2015
Lisanne Frontzek	Kim Demme	2010–2011
Holly Geddert	Olivia Ahlers	2016–
Hugo Gießler	Hubertus Müller-Kehlbach	2012–2015
Gustav Grabolle	Hannes Borchers	2008–2010
Jacob Gunkel	Phillip Gubisch	2009–2012
Juliette Hartig	Hedwig "Hedda" Eisenbarth	2015
Paul Hartmann	Johannes "Jonny" Enns	2012–2015
Jelena Herrmann	Miriam Kreil	2012–2015
Elena Hesse	Petra Klein	2017-
Maja Hieke	Jule Hohenstein	2016–2017
Constantin Hühn	Ole Weiland	2008–2009
Sophie Imelmann	Marianne "Mary" Fuchs	2011–2012
Miriam Katzer	Ronja Varga	2009–2012
Pascal Kleßen	Bertram "Berti" Fußmann	2009–2011
Lennart König	Sándor Laszlo	2010–2013
Jacob Körner	Nils Kupferschmid	2012–2015
Esther Kraft	Marie Luise Krüger	2008–2009
Viktoria Krause	Elisabeth "Liz" Fuchs	2011–2013
Selma Kunze	Sarah Genzmer	2017-
Luna Kuse	Martha Pracht	2016–
Lena Ladig	Johanna "Jo" Hoffmann	2011–2013
Lukas Lange	Adrian Leupold	2013–2015
Lucas Leppert	Thomas "Tommy" Kluge	2010–2015
Luisa Liebtrau	Corinna "Coco" Schmidt	2008–2011
Tom Linnemann	Simon Flinth	2017-
Mareike Ludwig	Magda Gröber	2010–2011
Ada Lüer	Mila Burmeister	2016–2017
Helene Mardicke	Roxanne "Roxy" Wildenhahn	2013–2015
Oskar Kraska McKone	Raphael Nägli	2013–2015
David Meier	David Groth	2013–2016
Marie Meinzenbach	Isabella "Bella" Rückert	2012–2013
Jakob Menkens	Henri Weismann	2017-
Lisa Nestler	Karlotta "Lotta" Schmied	2015–2016
Thanh-Huyen Nguyen	Dodo Duyen	2017-
Julia Nürnberger	Milena Ibrahimovic	2008–2010
Noel Okwanga	Pawel Kronbügel	2017-
Ronja Peters	Karla Bussmann	2008–2009
Sina Radtke	Julia Schnabel	2008–2009
Yannick Rau	Dominik von Blumenberg	2013–2017
Robert Reichert	Justus Kluge	2010–2013
Max Reschke	Tim Seidler	2008–2009
David Röder	Max Bussmann	2008–2009
Anica Röhlinger	Sophie Mai	2009–2012
Jana Röhlinger	Mia Bussmann	2008–2009
Sinan El Sayed	Kasimir Pohl	2017-
Maximilian Scharr	Jannis Röber	2016–
Alexandra Schiller	Annika Schneeberger	2011–2012
Lena Schneidewind	Clara Fischer	2011–2012
Ruth Schönherr	Li-Ming Schumann	2012–2015
Liesa Schrinner	Vivien Morante	2008–2010
Anna Steinhardt	Paulina Pasulke	2008–2009
Hanna-Sophie Stötzel	Nele Krüger	2017-
Nini Tsiklauri	Layla Farsad	2008–2010
Julia Turkali	Tatjana Jonas, adopted, née Steiner	2009–2010
Paul Uhlemann	Friedrich Paul	2015–2016
Albert Wey	Elias Leinhoff	2011–2012
Annalisa Weyel	Alva Rehbein	2015–2017
Stefan Wiegand	Tobias "Tobi" Knecht	2011–2015
Viviane Witschel	Emma Kluge	2010
Sabrina Wollweber	Felicitas "Feli" Ferber	2008–2012
Florian Wünsche	Manuel Siewert	2008–2010
Timon Würriehausen	Finn Hebestreit	2016
Paul Ziegner	Nino Rieckerts	2010–2011
Carlotta Weide	Cäcilia Amelie von Toll	2018-
Thorin Holland	Hermann Zech	2018-
Helen Möller	Jona Chung	2018-
Paul Ewald	Julius Alexander Berk	2018-
Danil Aprelkov	Leon Sperling	2018-
Marc Elflein	Moritz Overmann	2018-
Fynn Malou Meinert	Paul Sperling	2018-
Ferenc Amberg	Pit Hansen	2018-
Madeleine Haas	Rike Reinhardt	2018-
Laura Eßer	Zoe Lindenau	2018-

Teachers and Staff

Actor	Role	Tenure
Liz Baffoe	Changa Miesbach	2008–
Georg Blumreiter	Uwe Krassnick	2012–2015
Angelika Böttiger	Lieselotte Rottbach	2011–
Olaf Burmeister	Dr. Heinrich "Heiner" Zech	2008–
Janina Elkin	Anna-Carina Levin	2011–
Lisa Feller	Dr. Daniela Schumann	2012–2015
Anja Franke	Katrin Burkert	2010–2011
Maximilian Grill	Lars Harnack	2008–2011
Tobias Kasimirowicz	Dr. Hans-Heinrich Mahrler	2012
Cornelia Kaupert	Margarete Zech	2008–2014
Ramona Kunze-Libnow	Dr. Franka Steiner	2008–2010
Mirja Mahir	Elisabeth Bräuning	2008–2011
Tim Oldenburg	Moritz Bauernschmitt	2015
Peter Sodann	Dr. Rudolf Bräuning	2008–2013
Damian Thüne	Stefan Klein "Remo Vage"	2016-2017
Elisa Ueberschär	Wiebke Schiller	2017-
Laura Vietzen	Christina Falk	2016–
Björn von der Wellen	Alexander "Alex" Fischer	2011–2015

== Awards and success ==
The show has received three awards.

- In March 1999, a jury of 32 children awarded it the Goldener Spatz (Golden Sparrow) in the category Fiktion kurz (short fiction). This was at the eleventh Deutsches Kinder-Film und Fernseh-Festivals (German Children's Film and Television Festival).
- In July 1999, Schloss Einstein won the Goldener Telix from the TV guide Gong in the category Serie oder Film mit Schauspielern (television series or film with actors).
- In 2010, it won the Goldener Spatz award again in the series category.

The popular success of the show has resulted in high TV ratings. Schloss Einstein is shown not only in Germany but also in many other countries: in Norway, Russia, Belarus, Ukraine, Slovakia, Hungary, Italy, Liechtenstein, Belgium, and the Netherlands. A textbook for use in German schools, containing themes from Schloss Einstein, has been published.

== Opening credits ==
From the first season to the end of the eighth season, there were always new, but similar, opening credits.

In all opening credits, some current actors who play the students are shown with their respective character names. In the background, the viewers can hear the song "Die Einsteins feat. Julian — Alles ist relativ".

All opening credits until the end of the fourth season had a duration of 47 seconds. As of the fifth season, the opening credits and background music were prolonged by seven seconds to a total length of 54 seconds. This was done so that a few more actors could be presented.

The ninth season featured a completely redesigned opening credits sequence, which lasts 54 seconds. The 19 main characters from classes 6 to 9 are presented on-screen in 13 short scenes, which show several characters at once. Teachers, other adults, and children who are not students at Schloss Einstein are omitted.

=== Current opening credits ===
Starting with the tenth season, completely new opening credits were again developed. The background music was slightly modified, and the duration of the credits was lengthened. All main characters are presented along with their character names.

== Seasons of production ==
Season	Episodes	Total Episodes	Date of First Broadcast
1	1–76	76	Friday, 4 September 1998 until Friday, 18 February 2000 (5:05 pm)
2	77–116	40	Friday, 25 February 2000 until Friday, 24 November 2000 (5:05 pm)
3	117–168	52	Friday, 1 December 2000 until Friday, 2 March 2001 (5:05 pm); Saturday, 10 March 2001 until Saturday, 24 November 2001 (6:00 pm)
4	169–200	32	Saturday, 1 December 2001 until Saturday, 6 July 2002 (6:00 pm)
5	201–232	32	Saturday, 13 July 2002 until Saturday, 15 February 2003 (6:00 pm)
6	233–272	40	Saturday, 22 February 2003 until Saturday, 22 November 2003 (6:00 pm)
7	273–336	64	Saturday, 29 November 2003 until Saturday, 12 February 2005 (6:00 pm)
8	337–392	56	Saturday, 19 February 2005 until Saturday, 27 August 2005 (6:00 pm); Saturday, 3 September 2005 until Saturday, 25 March 2006 (5:20 pm)
9	393–428	36	Saturday, 1 April 2006 until Saturday, 16 September 2006 (5:20 pm); Saturday, 23 September 2006 until Saturday, 2 December 2006 (5:15 pm)
10	429–480	52	Saturday, 9 December 2006 until Saturday, 1 December 2007 (5:20 pm)
11	481–532	52	Saturday, 5 January 2008 until Saturday, 23 February 2008 (2 Episodes, 4:50 and 5:15 pm); Saturday, 1 March 2008 until Saturday, 12 July 2008 (5:15 pm); Saturday, 30 August 2008 until Saturday, 13 December 2008 (5:15 pm)
12	533–584	52	Saturday, 3 January 2009 until Saturday, 31 January 2009 (2 Episodes, 4:45 pm und 5:10 pm); Saturday, 7 February 2009 until Saturday, 21 November 2009 (5:10 pm)
13	585–636	52	Saturday, 2 January 2010 until Saturday, 25 December 2010 (5:10 pm)
14	637–688	52	Saturday, 8 January 2011 until Saturday, 7 May 2011 (5:10 pm); Saturday, 14 May 2011 until Saturday, 1 October 2011 (2:10 pm); Saturday, 8 October 2011 until Saturday, 24 December 2011 (2:35 pm); Saturday, 31 December 2011 (7:50 pm) (New Year's Eve Special)
15	689–740	52	Saturday, 7 January 2012 until Saturday, 15 December 2012 (2:35 pm); Saturday, 22 December 2012 (2 Episodes, 2:35 and 3:00 pm)
16	741–792	52	Saturday, 5 January 2013 until Saturday, 28 December 2013 (2:35 pm)
17	793–818	26	Saturday, 4 January 2014 until Saturday, 28 June 2014 (2:35 pm)
18	819–844	26	Saturday, 3 January 2015 until Saturday, 4 July 2015 (2:35 pm)
19	845–870	26	Tuesday, 9 February 2016 until Tuesday, 15 March 2016 (Daily episodes, 2:35 pm)
20	871–896	26	Tuesday, 14 February 2017 until Tuesday, 21 March 2017 (Daily episodes, 2:35 pm)

== Events ==
At irregular intervals, events featuring the actors of Schloss Einstein take place in Germany.

Among these events were:

- the Gi’me-5-KI.KA-Party (day for friendship and tolerance, August 31, 2003)
- the international children's party (23 Nisan) in Berlin (April 24, 2004)
- the KI.KA-Party for the 300th episode of Schloss Einstein (June 7, 2004)
- the Schloss-Einstein-Sommerparty (Schloss Einstein summer party, June 27, 2005)
- the KiKA summer tours, which take place annually

On June 10, 2007, there was a ceremony in Potsdam-Babelsberg on the occasion of the last shooting day.

== Books ==
In 2000, the book Schloss Einstein — Das Klassenbuch: 100 Folgen Schloss Einstein (Schloss Einstein — The Classbook: 100 Episodes of Schloss Einstein) was published. It presents the main actors in the show and the contents previous episodes. It was published by vgs verlagsgesellschaft. A poster book and an autograph book have also been published.

In 2003, a cookbook Schloss Einstein — Kochen mit Einstein (Cooking with Schloss Einstein) was published. It was written by Peter Brandt and Dieter Saldecki, and published by vgs verlagsgesellschaft.

Sixteen novels about Schloss Einstein have been published.

- Volumes 1 to 5 were written by Simon Hauser
- Volumes 6 to 11 and 15 were written by Uschi Flacke
- Volumes 12 to 14 and 16 were written by Dana Bechtle-Bechtinger

The titles of the novels are:

- Band 1: Die Rivalin
- Band 2: Ein seltsamer Gast
- Band 3: Sie liebt ihn, sie liebt ihn nicht
- Band 4: Blaue Haare für Sven Weber
- Band 5: Alberts Enkel
- Band 6: Schmetterlinge im Bauch
- Band 7: Der gestohlene Hit
- Band 8: Spiel mit dem Feuer
- Band 9: Skandal am Faulen See
- Band 10: Ein Traum in Chrome
- Band 11: Date mit einem Superhirn
- Band 12: Der Schatz von Seelitz
- Band 13: Die Paten
- Band 14: Kurz und Kleinstein
- Band 15: Love Story
- Band 16: Anna in Love

Besides the novels, there are three Schloss Einstein Exklusiv books in which the further histories of the main actors of the first season are told. These were written by Uschi Flacke and published by vgs verlagsgesellschaft. They are:

- Katharina — Modelträume werden wahr
- Kleine Prinzen
- Nadines Story

== Other media ==
In 2004, a music album was published, which included many bands.

A "Best of" DVD, several radio dramas on cassettes and CDs, and a magazine about the show covering the years 2001 to 2003, have also been released.
